= Nueva Ecija's 1st congressional district =

Legislative district of the Philippines

- Constituency for the House of Representatives of the Philippines
- Boundary of the 1st congressional district in Nueva Ecija

- Location of Nueva Ecija within the Philippines
- Province: Nueva Ecija
- Region: Central Luzon
- Population: 598,187 (2020)
- Electorate: 388,005 (2022)
- Major settlements: 9 LGUs: Municipalities; Aliaga; Cuyapo; Guimba; Licab; Nampicuan; Quezon; Santo Domingo; Talavera; Zaragoza
- Area: 1,027.38 km^{2} (396.67 sq mi)

Current constituency
- Created: 1926
- Representative: Mikaela Angela B. Suansing
- Political party: PFP; Unang Sigaw
- Congressional bloc: Majority

Nueva Ecija's 1st congressional district is one of the four congressional districts of the Philippines in the province of Nueva Ecija. It has been represented in the House of Representatives of the Philippines since 1928. The district consists of the western municipalities of Aliaga, Cuyapo, Guimba, Licab, Nampicuan, Quezon, Santo Domingo, Talavera and Zaragoza. It is currently represented in the 20th Congress by Mikaela Angela B. Suansing of the Partido Federal ng Pilipinas and Unang Sigaw.

== Representation history ==
| # | Image | Member | Term of office | | Legislature | Party | Electoral history | Constituent LGUs |
| # | Image | Member | Start | End | Legislature | Party | Electoral history | Constituent LGUs |
|---|---|---|---|---|---|---|---|---|
=== Nueva Ecija's 1st district for the House of Representatives of the Philippine Islands ===
District created December 7, 1926 from Nueva Ecija's at-large district.
| 1 | | Hermogenes Concepción Sr. | June 5, 1928 | June 2, 1931 | 8th | Demócrata | Elected in 1928. | 1928–1935; Aliaga, Cuyapo, Guimba, Jaen, Licab, Lupao, Muñoz, Nampicuan, Quezon, San Antonio, Santo Domingo, Talavera, Zaragoza |
| 2 | | Manuel V. Gallego | June 2, 1931 | June 5, 1934 | 9th | Nacionalista; Consolidado | Elected in 1931. | 1928–1935; Aliaga, Cuyapo, Guimba, Jaen, Licab, Lupao, Muñoz, Nampicuan, Quezon, San Antonio, Santo Domingo, Talavera, Zaragoza |
| 3 | | José Robles Jr. | June 5, 1934 | September 16, 1935 | 10th | Nacionalista; Demócrata Pro-Independencia | Elected in 1934. | 1928–1935; Aliaga, Cuyapo, Guimba, Jaen, Licab, Lupao, Muñoz, Nampicuan, Quezon, San Antonio, Santo Domingo, Talavera, Zaragoza |
| # | Image | Member | Term of office | | National Assembly | Party | Electoral history | Constituent LGUs |
| # | Image | Member | Start | End | National Assembly | Party | Electoral history | Constituent LGUs |
=== Nueva Ecija's 1st district for the National Assembly (Commonwealth of the Philippines) ===
| 4 | | Manuel A. Alzate | September 16, 1935 | December 30, 1941 | 1st | Nacionalista; Democrático | Elected in 1935. | 1935–1941; Aliaga, Cuyapo, Guimba, Jaen, Licab, Lupao, Muñoz, Nampicuan, Quezon, San Antonio, Santo Domingo, Talavera, Zaragoza |
| 4 | | Manuel A. Alzate | September 16, 1935 | December 30, 1941 | 2nd | Nacionalista | Re-elected in 1938. | 1935–1941; Aliaga, Cuyapo, Guimba, Jaen, Licab, Lupao, Muñoz, Nampicuan, Quezon, San Antonio, Santo Domingo, Talavera, Zaragoza |
District dissolved into the two-seat Nueva Ecija's at-large district for the National Assembly (Second Philippine Republic).
| # | Image | Member | Term of office | | Common wealth Congress | Party | Electoral history | Constituent LGUs |
| # | Image | Member | Start | End | Common wealth Congress | Party | Electoral history | Constituent LGUs |
=== Nueva Ecija's 1st district for the House of Representatives of the Commonwealth of the Philippines ===
District re-created May 24, 1945.
| (2) | | Manuel V. Gallego | June 11, 1945 | May 25, 1946 | 1st | Nacionalista | Elected in 1941. | 1945–1946; Aliaga, Cuyapo, Guimba, Jaen, Licab, Lupao, Muñoz, Nampicuan, Quezon, San Antonio, Santo Domingo, Talavera, Zaragoza |
| # | Image | Member | Term of office | | Congress | Party | Electoral history | Constituent LGUs |
| # | Image | Member | Start | End | Congress | Party | Electoral history | Constituent LGUs |
=== Nueva Ecija's 1st district for the House of Representatives of the Philippines ===
| 5 | | José Cando | May 25, 1946 | December 30, 1949 | 1st | Democratic Alliance | Elected in 1946. Oath of office deferred to January 29, 1948 due to electoral protests against Democratic Alliance candidates. | 1946–1949; Aliaga, Cuyapo, Guimba, Jaen, Licab, Lupao, Muñoz, Nampicuan, Quezon, San Antonio, Santo Domingo, Talavera, Zaragoza |
| 6 | | José O. Corpus | December 30, 1949 | December 30, 1957 | 2nd | Liberal | Elected in 1949. | 1949–1972; Aliaga, Cuyapo, Guimba, Jaen, Licab, Lupao, Muñoz, Nampicuan, Quezon, San Antonio, Santo Domingo, Talavera, Talugtug, Zaragoza |
| 6 | | José O. Corpus | December 30, 1949 | December 30, 1957 | 3rd | Liberal | Re-elected in 1953. | 1949–1972; Aliaga, Cuyapo, Guimba, Jaen, Licab, Lupao, Muñoz, Nampicuan, Quezon, San Antonio, Santo Domingo, Talavera, Talugtug, Zaragoza |
| 7 | | Eugenio T. Baltao | December 30, 1957 | December 30, 1969 | 4th | Liberal | Elected in 1957. | 1949–1972; Aliaga, Cuyapo, Guimba, Jaen, Licab, Lupao, Muñoz, Nampicuan, Quezon, San Antonio, Santo Domingo, Talavera, Talugtug, Zaragoza |
| 7 | | Eugenio T. Baltao | December 30, 1957 | December 30, 1969 | 5th | Liberal | Re-elected in 1961. | 1949–1972; Aliaga, Cuyapo, Guimba, Jaen, Licab, Lupao, Muñoz, Nampicuan, Quezon, San Antonio, Santo Domingo, Talavera, Talugtug, Zaragoza |
| 7 | | Eugenio T. Baltao | December 30, 1957 | December 30, 1969 | 6th | Liberal | Re-elected in 1965. | 1949–1972; Aliaga, Cuyapo, Guimba, Jaen, Licab, Lupao, Muñoz, Nampicuan, Quezon, San Antonio, Santo Domingo, Talavera, Talugtug, Zaragoza |
| 8 | | Leopoldo D. Díaz | December 30, 1969 | September 23, 1972 | 7th | Nacionalista | Elected in 1969. Removed from office after imposition of martial law. | 1949–1972; Aliaga, Cuyapo, Guimba, Jaen, Licab, Lupao, Muñoz, Nampicuan, Quezon, San Antonio, Santo Domingo, Talavera, Talugtug, Zaragoza |
District dissolved into the sixteen-seat Region III's at-large district for the Interim Batasang Pambansa, followed by the four-seat Nueva Ecija's at-large district for the Regular Batasang Pambansa.
District re-created February 2, 1987.
| 9 | | Eduardo Nonato Joson | June 30, 1987 | June 30, 1992 | 8th | BALANE | Elected in 1987. | 1987–present Aliaga, Cuyapo, Guimba, Licab, Nampicuan, Quezon, Santo Domingo, Talavera, Zaragoza |
| 10 | | Renato Diaz | June 30, 1992 | June 30, 1998 | 9th | Lakas | Elected in 1992. | 1987–present Aliaga, Cuyapo, Guimba, Licab, Nampicuan, Quezon, Santo Domingo, Talavera, Zaragoza |
| 10 | | Renato Diaz | June 30, 1992 | June 30, 1998 | 10th | Lakas | Re-elected in 1995. | 1987–present Aliaga, Cuyapo, Guimba, Licab, Nampicuan, Quezon, Santo Domingo, Talavera, Zaragoza |
| 11 | | Josefina M. Joson | June 30, 1998 | June 30, 2007 | 11th | LAMMP (BALANE) | Elected in 1998. | 1987–present Aliaga, Cuyapo, Guimba, Licab, Nampicuan, Quezon, Santo Domingo, Talavera, Zaragoza |
| 11 | | Josefina M. Joson | June 30, 1998 | June 30, 2007 | 12th | NPC (BALANE) | Re-elected in 2001. | 1987–present Aliaga, Cuyapo, Guimba, Licab, Nampicuan, Quezon, Santo Domingo, Talavera, Zaragoza |
| 11 | | Josefina M. Joson | June 30, 1998 | June 30, 2007 | 13th | NPC (BALANE) | Re-elected in 2004. | 1987–present Aliaga, Cuyapo, Guimba, Licab, Nampicuan, Quezon, Santo Domingo, Talavera, Zaragoza |
| (9) | | Eduardo Nonato Joson | June 30, 2007 | June 30, 2010 | 14th | Independent (BALANE) | Elected in 2007. | 1987–present Aliaga, Cuyapo, Guimba, Licab, Nampicuan, Quezon, Santo Domingo, Talavera, Zaragoza |
| (11) | | Josefina M. Joson | June 30, 2010 | June 30, 2013 | 15th | NPC (BALANE) | Elected in 2010. | 1987–present Aliaga, Cuyapo, Guimba, Licab, Nampicuan, Quezon, Santo Domingo, Talavera, Zaragoza |
| 12 | | Estrellita B. Suansing | June 30, 2013 | June 30, 2022 | 16th | Liberal (Unang Sigaw) | Elected in 2013. | 1987–present Aliaga, Cuyapo, Guimba, Licab, Nampicuan, Quezon, Santo Domingo, Talavera, Zaragoza |
| 12 | | Estrellita B. Suansing | June 30, 2013 | June 30, 2022 | 17th | PDP–Laban | Re-elected in 2016. | 1987–present Aliaga, Cuyapo, Guimba, Licab, Nampicuan, Quezon, Santo Domingo, Talavera, Zaragoza |
| 12 | | Estrellita B. Suansing | June 30, 2013 | June 30, 2022 | 18th | PDP–Laban | Re-elected in 2019. | 1987–present Aliaga, Cuyapo, Guimba, Licab, Nampicuan, Quezon, Santo Domingo, Talavera, Zaragoza |
| 13 | | Mikaela Angela B. Suansing | June 30, 2022 | Incumbent | 19th | Nacionalista (Unang Sigaw) | Elected in 2022. | 1987–present Aliaga, Cuyapo, Guimba, Licab, Nampicuan, Quezon, Santo Domingo, Talavera, Zaragoza |
| 13 | | Mikaela Angela B. Suansing | June 30, 2022 | Incumbent | 19th | Lakas (Unang Sigaw) | Elected in 2022. | 1987–present Aliaga, Cuyapo, Guimba, Licab, Nampicuan, Quezon, Santo Domingo, Talavera, Zaragoza |
| 13 | | Mikaela Angela B. Suansing | June 30, 2022 | Incumbent | 20th | PFP (Unang Sigaw) | Re-elected in 2025. | 1987–present Aliaga, Cuyapo, Guimba, Licab, Nampicuan, Quezon, Santo Domingo, Talavera, Zaragoza |

== Election results ==
=== 2025 ===
| Candidate | Party | Votes | % |
|---|---|---|---|
| Mika Suansing (incumbent) | Lakas–CMD | 234,820 | 83.62 |
| Argel Joseph Cabatbat | Independent | 40,857 | 14.55 |
| Virgilio Baldovino Jr. | Independent | 5,141 | 1.83 |
| Total | | 280,818 | 100.00 |
| Valid votes | | 280,818 | 86.26 |
| Invalid/blank votes | | 44,712 | 13.74 |
| Total votes | | 325,530 | 100.00 |
| Registered voters/turnout | | 400,221 | 81.34 |
| Lakas–CMD hold | | | |
Source: Commission on Elections

=== 2022 ===
2022 Philippine House of Representatives elections
| Party | Candidate | Votes | % |
|---|---|---|---|
| Nacionalista | Mika Suansing | 171,946 | 58.77 |
| PDP–Laban | Rommel Padilla | 78,251 | 26.74 |
| RP | Alex Balutan | 42,354 | 14.47 |
| Total votes | | 292,551 | 100 |
| Nacionalista gain from PDP–Laban | | | |

=== 2019 ===
2019 Philippine House of Representatives elections
| Party | Candidate | Votes | % |
|---|---|---|---|
| PDP–Laban | Estrelita Suansing | 149,697 | |
| Independent | Rommel Padilla | 98,240 | |
| Total votes | | 247,937 | 100 |
| PDP–Laban hold | | | |

=== 2016 ===
2016 Philippine House of Representatives elections
| Party | Candidate | Votes | % |
|---|---|---|---|
| Liberal | Estrelita Suansing | 145,685 | |
| UNA | Josefina Joson | 78,512 | |
| Invalid or blank votes | | 31,478 | |
| Total votes | | 255,675 | |
| Liberal hold | | | |

=== 2013 ===
2013 Philippine House of Representatives elections
| Party | Candidate | Votes | % |
|---|---|---|---|
| Sigaw | Estrellita Suansing | 94,952 | 45.12 |
| NPC | Mariano Cristino Joson | 78,267 | 37.19 |
| Independent | Renato Diaz | 14,805 | 7.03 |
| Margin of victory | | 16,685 | 7.93% |
| Invalid or blank votes | | 22,427 | 10.66 |
| Total votes | | 210,451 | 100.00 |

=== 2010 ===
2010 Philippine House of Representatives elections
| Party | Candidate | Votes | % |
|---|---|---|---|
| NPC | Josefina Joson | 107,202 | 53.37 |
| Lakas–Kampi | Renato Diaz | 84,750 | 42.19 |
| Liberal | Richard Maliwat | 6,388 | 3.18 |
| PGRP | Yolanda de Jesus | 1,534 | 0.76 |
| Independent | Vitaliano Ugalde | 998 | 0.50 |
| Valid ballots | | 200,872 | 88.10 |
| Invalid or blank votes | | 27,133 | 11.90 |
| Total votes | | 228,005 | 100.00 |
| NPC gain from Independent | | | |

== See also ==
- Legislative districts of Nueva Ecija
