= Nampicuan =

Municipality in Nueva Ecija, Philippines

- Municipality
- Municipality of Nampicuan
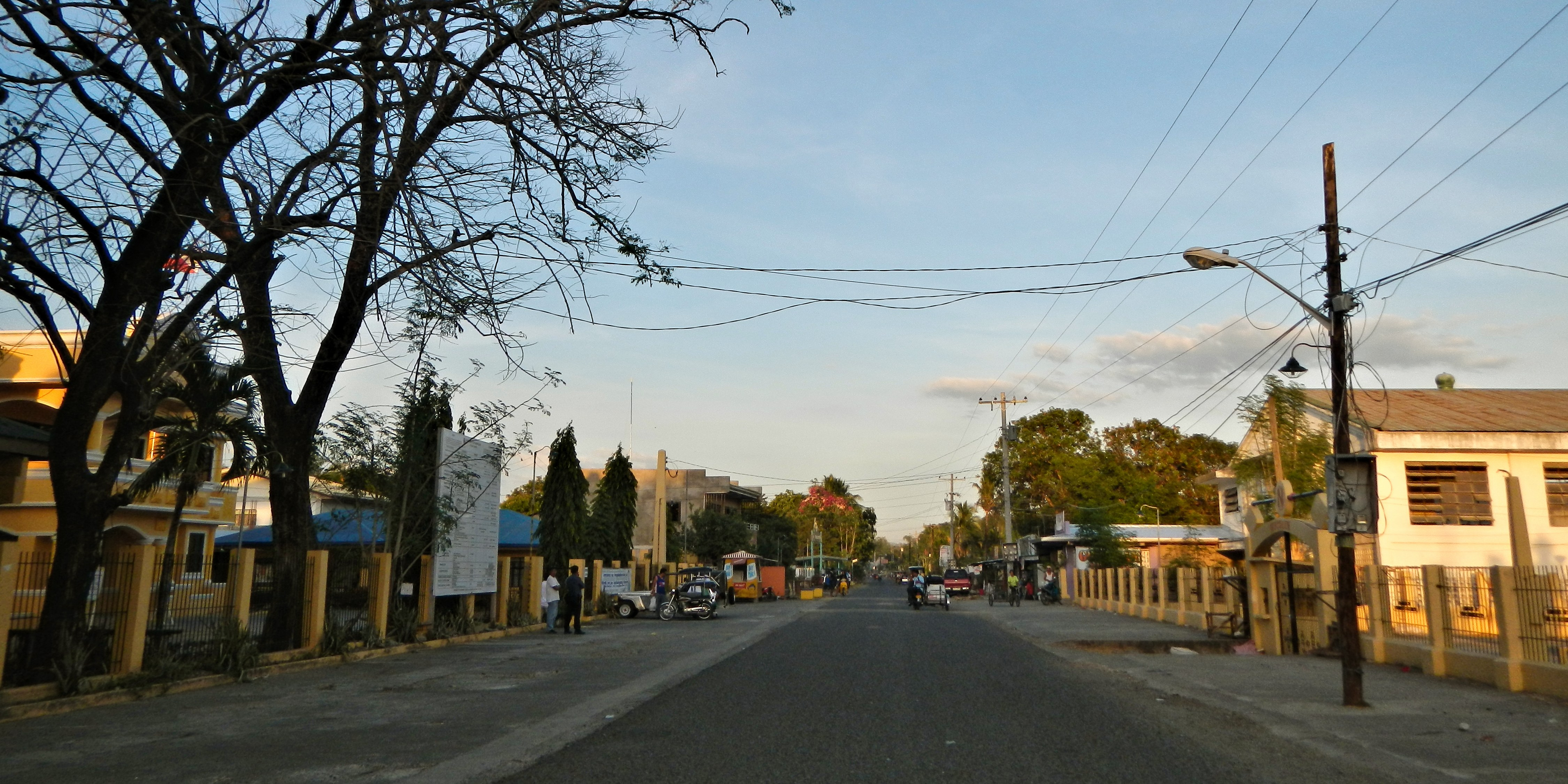
- Downtown area

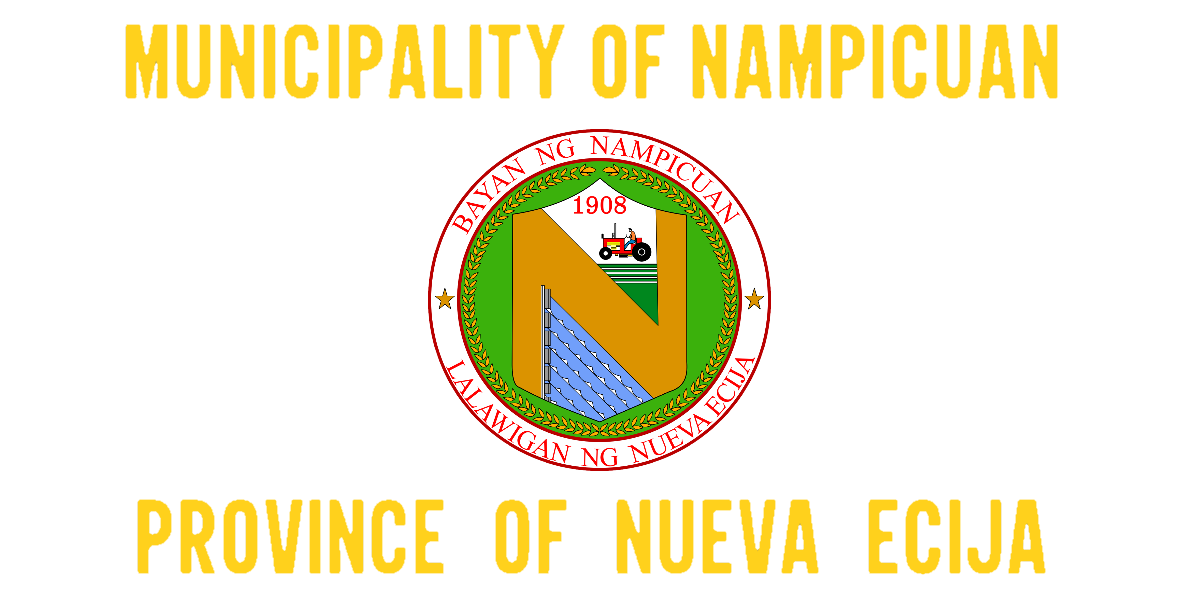
- Flag Seal
- Anthem: NAMPICUAN March
- Map of Nueva Ecija with Nampicuan highlighted
- Interactive map of Nampicuan
- Location within the Philippines
- Coordinates: 15°44′03″N 120°38′08″E
- Country: Philippines
- Region: Central Luzon
- Province: Nueva Ecija
- District: 1st district
- Barangays: 21 (see Barangays)

Government
  - Type: Sangguniang Bayan
  - Mayor: Mario G. Lacurom
  - Vice Mayor: Victor M. Badar
  - Representative: Mikaela Angela B. Suansing
  - Municipal Councilors: Members: Reginaldo C. Pascual; Bessie S. Tacas; Jervy A. Cruz; Jay S.Santos; Roberto S. Marquez; Kathlene M. Saclao; Marlou P. Gamboa; Marlon E. Celestino
  - Electorate: 11,606 voters (2025)

Area
  - Total: 52.60 km^{2} (20.31 sq mi)
- Elevation: 22 m (72 ft)
- Highest elevation: 44 m (144 ft)
- Lowest elevation: 16 m (52 ft)

Population (2024 census)
  - Total: 15,297
  - Density: 290.8/km^{2} (753.2/sq mi)
  - Households: 3,522

Economy
  - Income class: 4th municipal income class
  - Poverty incidence: 9.58% (2023)
  - Revenue: ₱ 117.6 million (2024)
  - Assets: ₱ 402.8 million (2024)
  - Expenditure: ₱ 115.3 million (2024)
  - Liabilities: ₱ 133.4 million (2024)

Service provider
  - Electricity: Tarlac 1 Electric Cooperative (TARELCO 1)
- Time zone: UTC+8 (PST)
- ZIP code: 3116
- PSGC: 0304918000
- IDD : area code: +63 (0)44
- Native languages: Ilocano; Tagalog

Nampicuan, officially the Municipality of Nampicuan (Ilocano: Ili ti Nampicuan; Pangasinan: Baley na Nampicuan; Tagalog: Bayan ng Nampicuan), is a municipality in the province of Nueva Ecija, Philippines. According to the 2024 census, it has a population of 15,297 people.

== History ==
The name Nampicuan stems from the word “Nagpicuan” which means a curve road. This refers to a trail called “curva”, as the inhabitants of Pangasinan used to call it. According to the first settlers, the site was a sitio named used “Surgue” or "Suli” situated in the eastern part of what eventually became the poblacion of Nampicuan. It was the point where the feeder road from Moncada, Tarlac turned abruptly north-east towards the town of Cuyapo, Nueva Ecija.

The first known settlers were Ilocanos from Paoay, Ilocos Region, Pangasinan and Zambales. In 1880, having found the soil productive for agricultural purposes, the early settlers cleared the place, cultivated the land and cut down the trees. The trees were sawed into lumber later used to construct their houses.

Before its formal creation and declaration as a municipality, Nampicuan was then a part and under the political jurisdiction of the town of Cuyapo. As time passed and as the population continued to grow, the demand for land and its resources grew such that, by the end of the 19th century, the barrio Nampicuan became a municipality and the first alcaldes mayores were Andres Tabilangan and Feliciano Cuaresma.

In 1903, while the Philippines was still under American rule, Nampicuan was reverted to the status of a barrio of Cuyapo. Upon proper presentation however of the prominent residents of this place, Nampicuan was again elevated to the status of municipality. In 1907, the first church was constructed led by Reverend Luis Corpuz and the establishment of Gabaldon Primary School under the first Principal/Teacher, Clodualdo Bringas. After a year, Nampicuan become a third class municipality of Nueva Ecija with the first leaders, President Laureano O. Gonzales and Vice – President Simeon Quiaoit.

== Geography ==
=== Barangays ===
Nampicuan is politically subdivided into 21 barangays. Each barangay consists of puroks and some have sitios.

- Alemania
- Ambassador Alzate Village
- Cabaducan East (Poblacion)
- Cabaducan West (Poblacion)
- Cabawangan
- East Central Poblacion
- Edy
- Maeling
- Mayantoc
- Medico
- Monic
- North poblacion
- Northwest Poblacion
- Estacion
- West Poblacion
- Recuerdo
- South Central Poblacion
- Southeast Poblacion
- Southwest Poblacion
- Tony
- West Central Poblacion.

=== Climate ===
Climate data for Nampicuan, Nueva Ecija
Month	Jan	Feb	Mar	Apr	May	Jun	Jul	Aug	Sep	Oct	Nov	Dec	Year
Mean daily maximum °C (°F)	30 (86)	31 (88)	33 (91)	35 (95)	33 (91)	31 (88)	30 (86)	29 (84)	29 (84)	30 (86)	31 (88)	30 (86)	31 (88)
Mean daily minimum °C (°F)	19 (66)	19 (66)	20 (68)	22 (72)	24 (75)	24 (75)	24 (75)	24 (75)	23 (73)	22 (72)	21 (70)	20 (68)	22 (71)
Average precipitation mm (inches)	3 (0.1)	2 (0.1)	5 (0.2)	10 (0.4)	80 (3.1)	107 (4.2)	138 (5.4)	147 (5.8)	119 (4.7)	70 (2.8)	26 (1.0)	8 (0.3)	715 (28.1)
Average rainy days	2.0	1.7	2.7	4.6	16.1	20.8	24.0	23.0	21.4	15.5	8.0	3.2	143
Source: Meteoblue

== Demographics ==
Population census of Nampicuan

Year	Pop.	±% p.a.
1903	4,180	—
1918	4,632	+0.69%
1939	5,023	+0.39%
1948	5,377	+0.76%
1960	6,084	+1.03%
1970	6,639	+0.88%
1975	7,350	+2.06%
1980	7,597	+0.66%

Year	Pop.	±% p.a.
1990	8,426	+1.04%
1995	10,708	+4.59%
2000	11,033	+0.64%
2007	11,786	+0.91%
2010	13,303	+4.50%
2015	14,954	+2.25%
2020	14,471	−0.69%
2024	15,297	+1.34%

Source: Philippine Statistics Authority

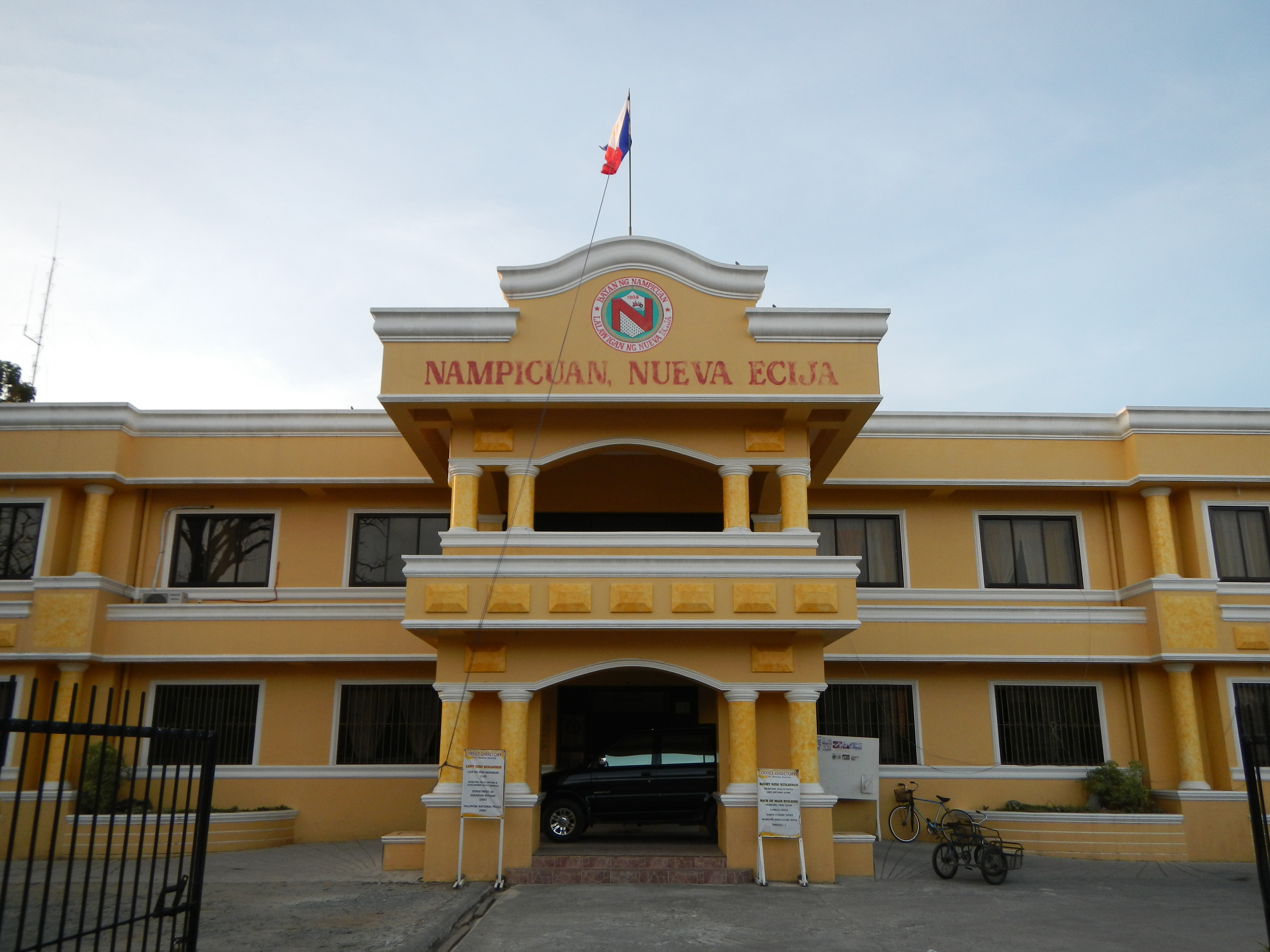
Nampicuan Town Hall

== Economy ==
Poverty incidence of Nampicuan (%)

Source: Philippine Statistics Authority

== Education ==
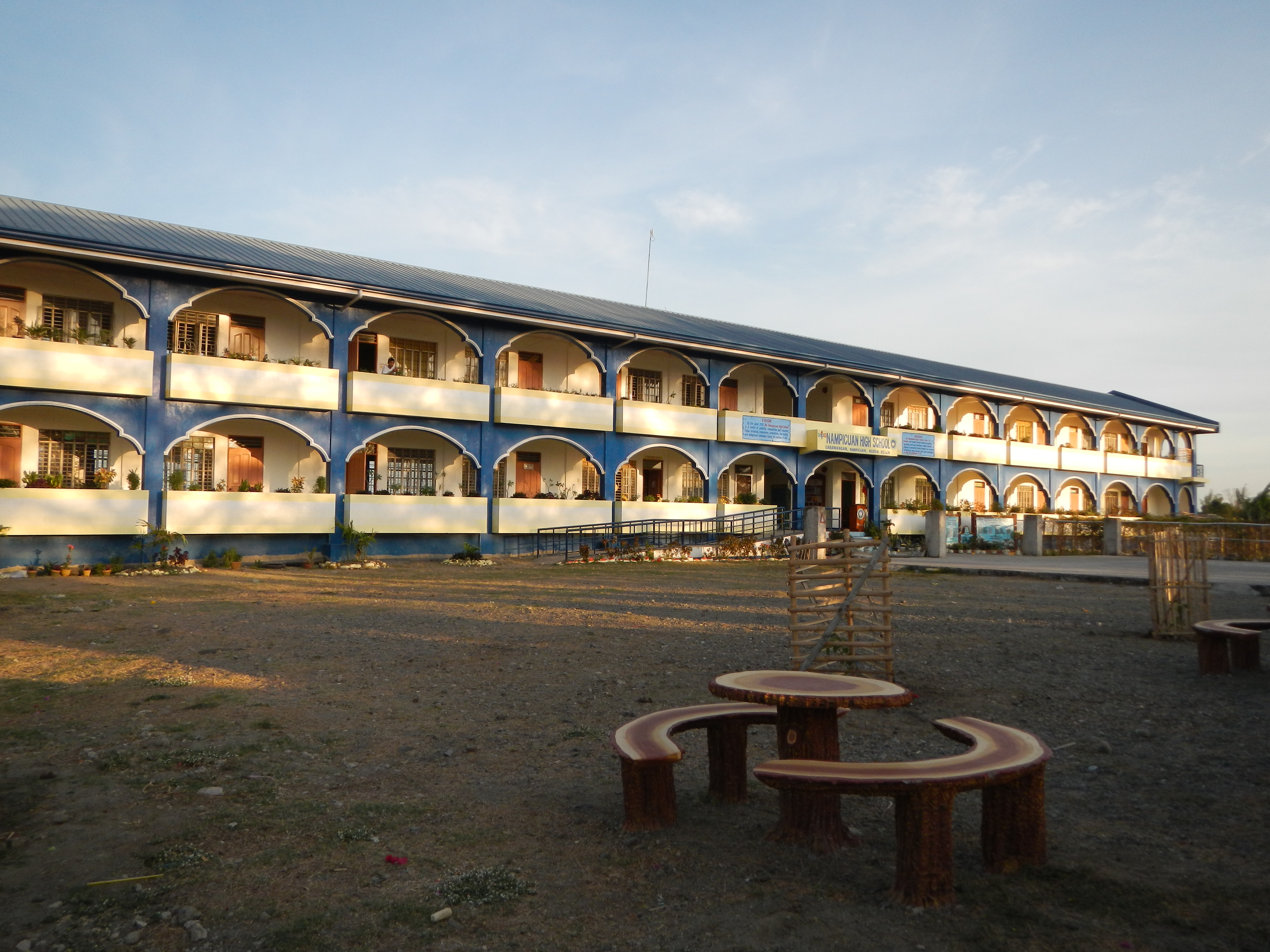
Nampicuan High School

The Nampicuan Schools District Office governs all educational institutions within the municipality. It oversees the management and operations of all private and public, from primary to secondary schools.

=== Primary and elementary schools ===
- Alzate Village Elementary School
- Cabawangan Elementary School
- Maeling Elementary School
- Mayantoc Elementary School
- Monic Elementary School
- Nampicuan Central School
- Nampicuan Christian Academy
- Recuerdo Elementary School
- United Methodist Church Learning Central

=== Secondary schools ===
- Nampicuan High School
- Recuerdo National High School
- St. Pius X Institute
