= Renato Diaz =

Renato Vera Diaz

Member of the Philippine House of Representatives for Nueva Ecija's 1st district
- In office June 30, 1992 – June 30, 1998
- Preceded by: Eduardo Nonato Joson
- Succeeded by: Josefina Joson

Personal details
- Born: Renato Vera Diaz; December 18, 1945 (age 79) Talavera, Nueva Ecija, Philippines
- Political party: Lakas
- Spouse: Cecilia Enriquez del Pilar
- Children: Celeste, Renato Jr., Cristina Cecilia
- Occupation: Chairman & President of RVDIAZ Consultancy & Management Corporation
- Nickname: RVD

Renato V. Diaz (born December 18, 1945), is a Filipino businessman, economist and a former congressman who represented the 1st District of Nueva Ecija from 1992 to 1998. He is the chairman and President of RVDIAZ Consultancy & Management Corporation, a consultancy firm specializing in facilitating foreign investments in the Philippines.

== Education ==
Diaz spent his elementary and high school days at San Beda College. He graduated cum laude and received the Dean's Award for Leadership and Academic Excellence from the same school with a Bachelor of Science in Commerce Major in Accounting degree.

He passed the CPA Board Examination and Career Service Professional Exam in 1967. While working for the First District of Nueva Ecija, House of Representatives, he had worked on earning an MBA degree from the Asian Institute of Management which he received in 1972.

== Professional background ==
=== Present positions ===
- Chairman & President, Philippine Aquamarine Resources, Inc.
- Chairman & President, Integrated Aquamarine & Agribusiness Enterprises Holding Corp.
- Chairman & President, RVDIAZ Consultancy & Management Corp.
- Chairman & President, RVD Management Services & Holding Co.,
- Managing Director, RVDiaz Management Consultancy Inc.
- Chairman, Center for Strategic Initiatives (CSI)
- Founding Member, Board of Trustees and Incorporators, Ramos Peace and Development Foundation, Inc. (RPDEV)
- Board Member, Board of Directors, Filsyn Corporation

=== Past positions ===
- President & CEO, BIC Investment & Capital Corporation (formerly Bancommerce Investment Corporation) (May 2008 to December 2012)
- Board Member, BIC Investment & Capital Corporation
- Board Member, Civil Aeronautics Board (CAB) private sector representative in the RP government body that regulates the economic aspects of aviation industry (2008- March 2010)
- Undersecretary
- Presidential Assistant for Central Luzon (August 2004 to March 2007
- Presidential Assistant for North Luzon (February 2001 to August 2004)
  1. In this capacity coordinated and facilitated projects in the area such as the US$1.1 Billion San Roque Multi-Purpose Dam Project, the North Luzon Expressway Project, the Casecnan Irrigation Project, the Subic-Clark Expressway Project, the North Rail Project, etc.
  2. Showcased North Luzon through the Go North Caravans, which won the Anvil Award in 2003.
- TV Talk Show Host
  1. March 2000 to August 2003 – INTERACTION – A Forum on Issues and Solutions – ABS CBN Metro Network (Channel 21)
  2. January to March – 365 Club Forum (Channel 21)
  3. 1997–1998, Dighay Bayan Host– Channel 4
- Consultant, First Metro Investment Corporation
- Congressman, 1st District of Nueva Ecija from 1992 to 1998. Consistently chosen as one of the most outstanding Congressmen in LAKAS-NUCD, Nueva Ecija, Regional co-chairman and a member of the party's National Executive Committee.
- Executive Vice President for Finance and Administration of Filsyn Corporation, a chemical fiber-manufacturing firm. He joined in July 1972 as Operations Manager and retired in 1992 when he assumed office as Representative of the First District of Nueva Ecija. He remains as a member of the board of directors. He negotiated the investment of Far Eastern Textile Group (second largest industrial group in Taiwan) for Filsyn in the late 1980s, originally a joint venture of Japanese company. He headed the international trading division.
- Vice President for Finance, The Peninsula Manila Hotel, Inc. the firm that owns the Peninsula Hotel Manila, listed as one of the world's leading luxury hotels. He was the owners’ representative, responsible for finance, administration and external relations. He retired in 1992 and was retained as a consultant.
- Member, Board of Director of Island King Aquaventures Corporation, Lakeview Industrial Corporation, Peggy Mills, Inc.
- Executive Vice President, Island King Aquaventures Corporation, a BOI registered corporation that owns and operates a 150-hectare farm in Capiz. He retired in 1992.
- Vice President and Director of Vernida Finance, Inc.
- 1969-1972 Private Secretary of Congressman Leopoldo D. Diaz, First District of Nueva Ecija, House of Representatives
- Summer 1971 Management Trainee, Victoria's Milling Company
- 1968, Marketing Representative, Mobile Oil Philippines
- 1968, Committee Secretary, Senate of the Philippines
- 1967, Secretary General, Antonino for Reelection Movement
- 1966, Executive Assistant, Institute of Student Affairs (ISA)

== Professional organizations ==
- Philippine Chamber of Commerce and Industry
- British Chamber of Commerce of the Philippines
- Management Association of the Philippines
- Philippine Institute of Certified Public Accountants (PICPA)
- Financial Executives Institute of the Philippines (FINEX)

== Record in Congress ==
Diaz was a congressman of the First District of Nueva Ecija for two terms.

=== Positions in the House of Representatives ===
- Assistant Majority Floor Leader (He was assigned to facilitate passage of the economic measures of the Ramos Administration.)
- Chairman, Committee on Ways and Means (served as Senior Vice Chairman up to March 1998)
- Chairman, Sub-committee on Internal Revenue
- Sole Representative of the House of Representatives to the Coordinating Council of the Philippines Assistance Program (CCPAP). He was part of the Philippine team that negotiated with the IMF-World Bank leaders and other foreign donors under the Official Development Assistance (ODA) Program.
- Member of the LEDAC (Legislative, Executive, Advisory Council) from 1993 to 1998. This is the body presided over by President Ramos which met weekly on legislative priorities and other national concerns.

=== Committee memberships ===
- Committee on Rules
- Committee on Trade and Industry
- Committee on Economic Affairs
- Committee on Agrarian Reform
- Committee on Natural Resources
- Committee on Inter Parliamentary Relations and Diplomacy
- Committee on Government Enterprises and Privatization
- Committee on Government Reorganization
- Committee on Civil Service

== Major laws ==
Diaz authored or co-authored 270 bills, 112 of which have been passed into law. On his capacity as majority floor leader and party stalwart, he claims to be partly responsible for the economic turnaround caused by the Ramos Administration. Some of the major bills that he sponsored are the following:

Republic Act No. 8424. Better known as The Comprehensive Tax Reform Program (CTRP). Millions of Filipino wage earners would receive significant tax breaks starting tax year 1998. Through this law, impoverished taxpayers could save up to one-month's take-home pay due to increased tax exemption levels. Also benefiting from this measure are millions of Overseas Filipino Workers whose income earned outside the Philippines would be totally exempt from taxes.

Republic Act No. 8435. Also known as the Agricultural and Fisheries Modernization Act, RA 8485 allocates P120 billion spread over a period of seven years to finance various infrastructure projects and credit facilities for farmers and fisherfolk. Of this total, P6 billion would go to various irrigation projects throughout the country. This is the biggest allocation in the law, which aims to enhance agriculture production even with the onset of the El Niño phenomenon.

Congressman Diaz has also marshaled support for the construction of the P16 billion (US$400 million) Casecnan tunnel, dam and power generation plant. This project will not only irrigate year round the 100,000 hectares of agricultural land under the Upper Pampanga River System (UPRIS) but an additional 53,000 hectares of new area mostly in the First District of Nueva Ecija as well. It would also generate 300 megawatts of electricity.

Republic Act No. 8181 “An act changing the basis of dutiable value of imported articles subject to an ad valorem rate duty from home consumption value (HCV) to transaction value (TV), amending for the purpose section 201 of title II, Part 1 of Presidential Decree No. 1404, otherwise known as the tariff and customs code of the Philippines, as amended and for other purposes.”

Republic Act No. 8183 “An act repealing Republic Act numbered five hundred twenty nine, as amended entitled an “Act to repeal the Uniform Currency Act”.

Republic Act No. 8182 “An act excluding official development assistance (ODA) from the foreign debt limit to facilitate the absorption and optimize the utilization of ODA resources, amending for the purpose Paragraph 1, Section 2 of Republic Act No. 4860, as amended.”

Republic Act No. 7716. Better known as the EVAT law. Co-author and Sponsor
