= Licab =

Municipality in Nueva Ecija, Philippines

- Municipality
- Municipality of Licab
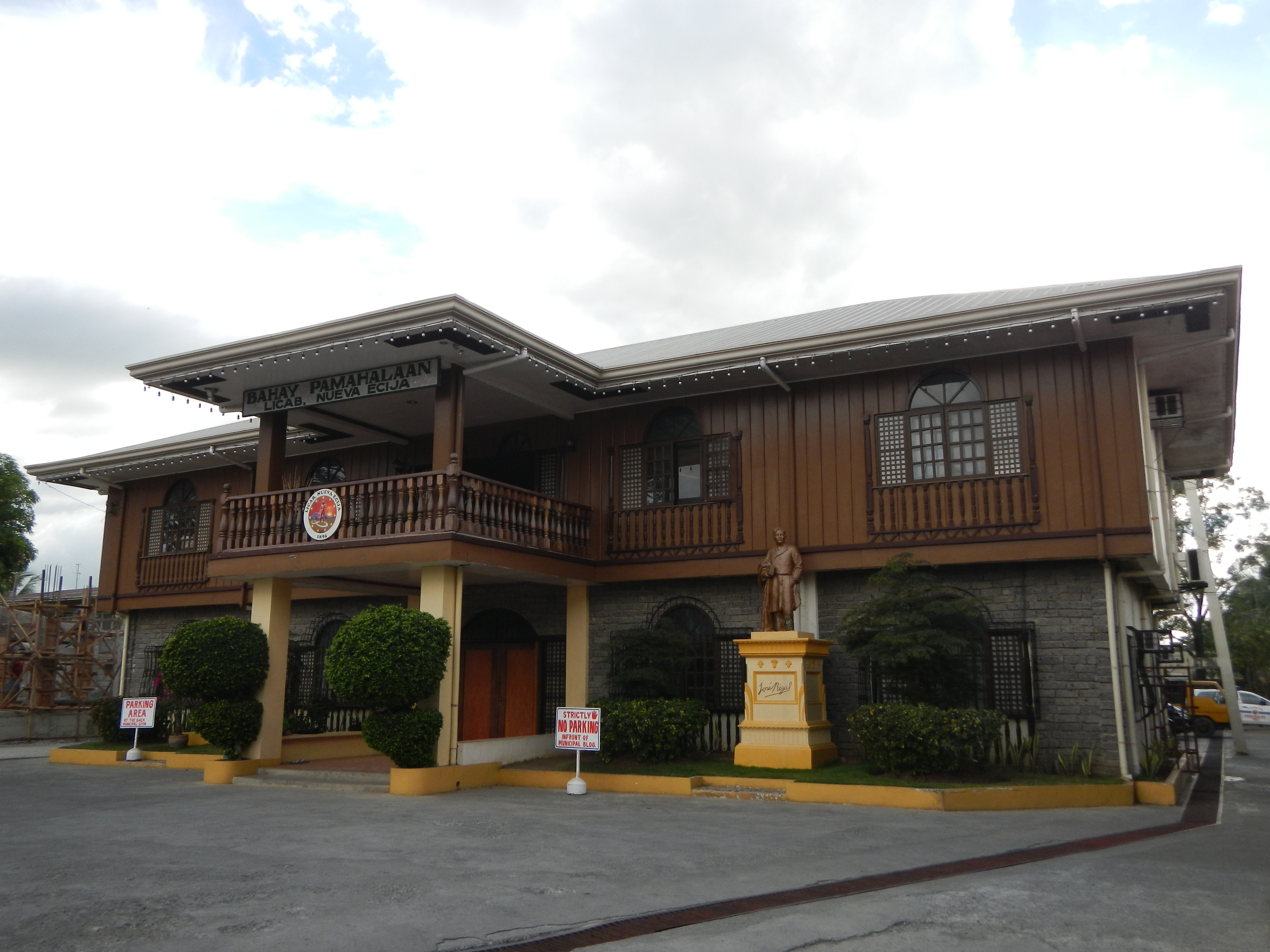
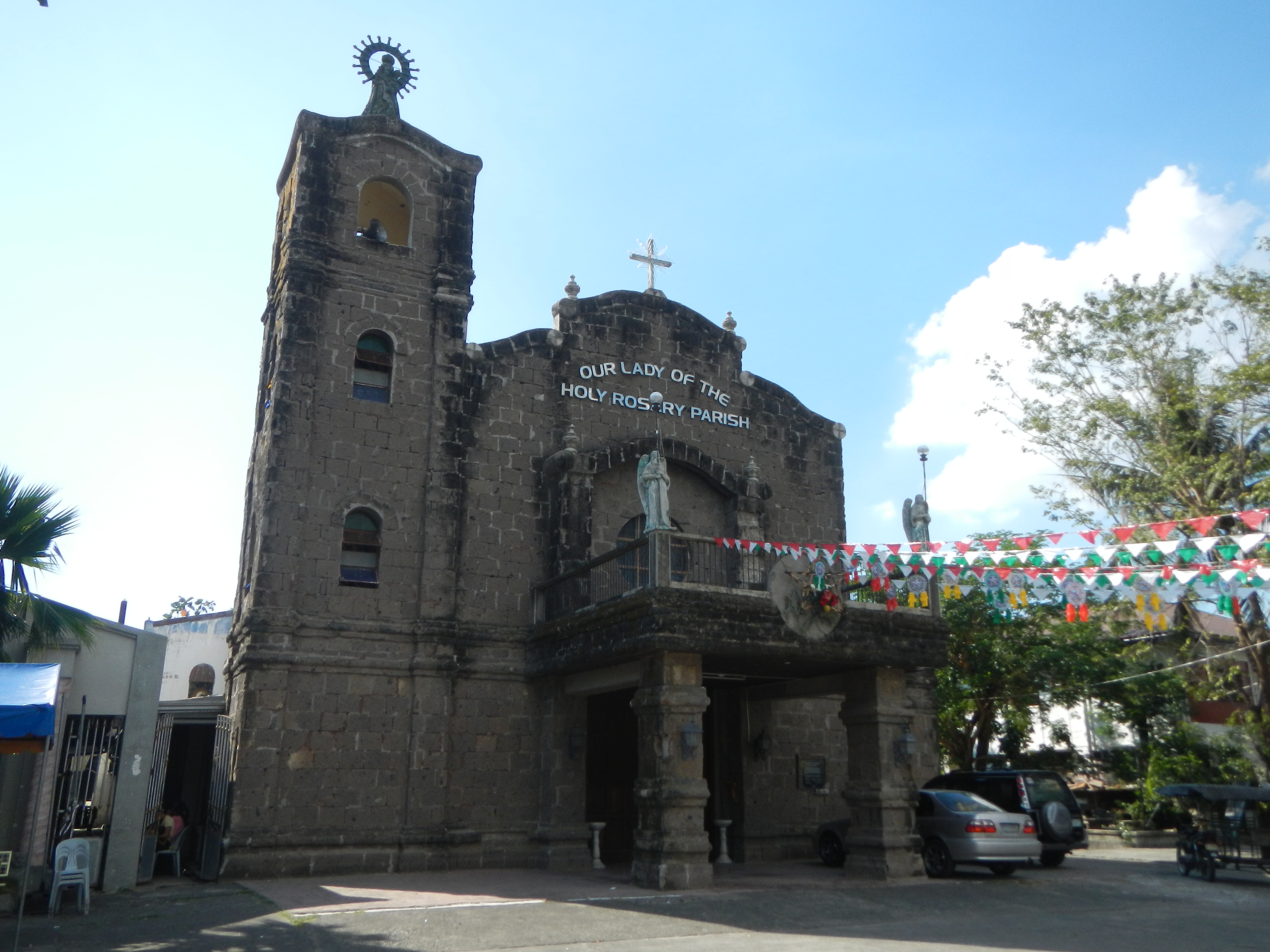
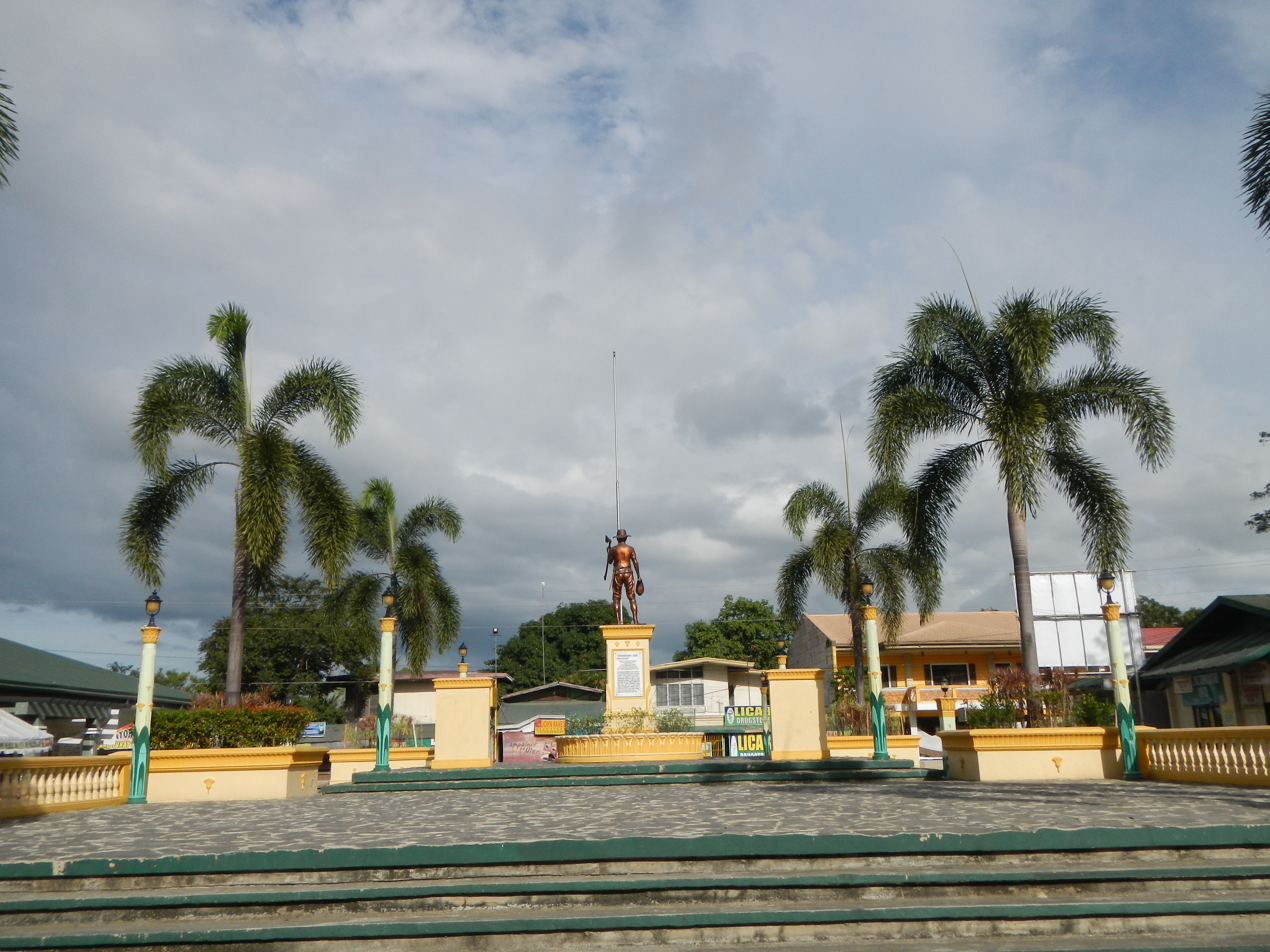
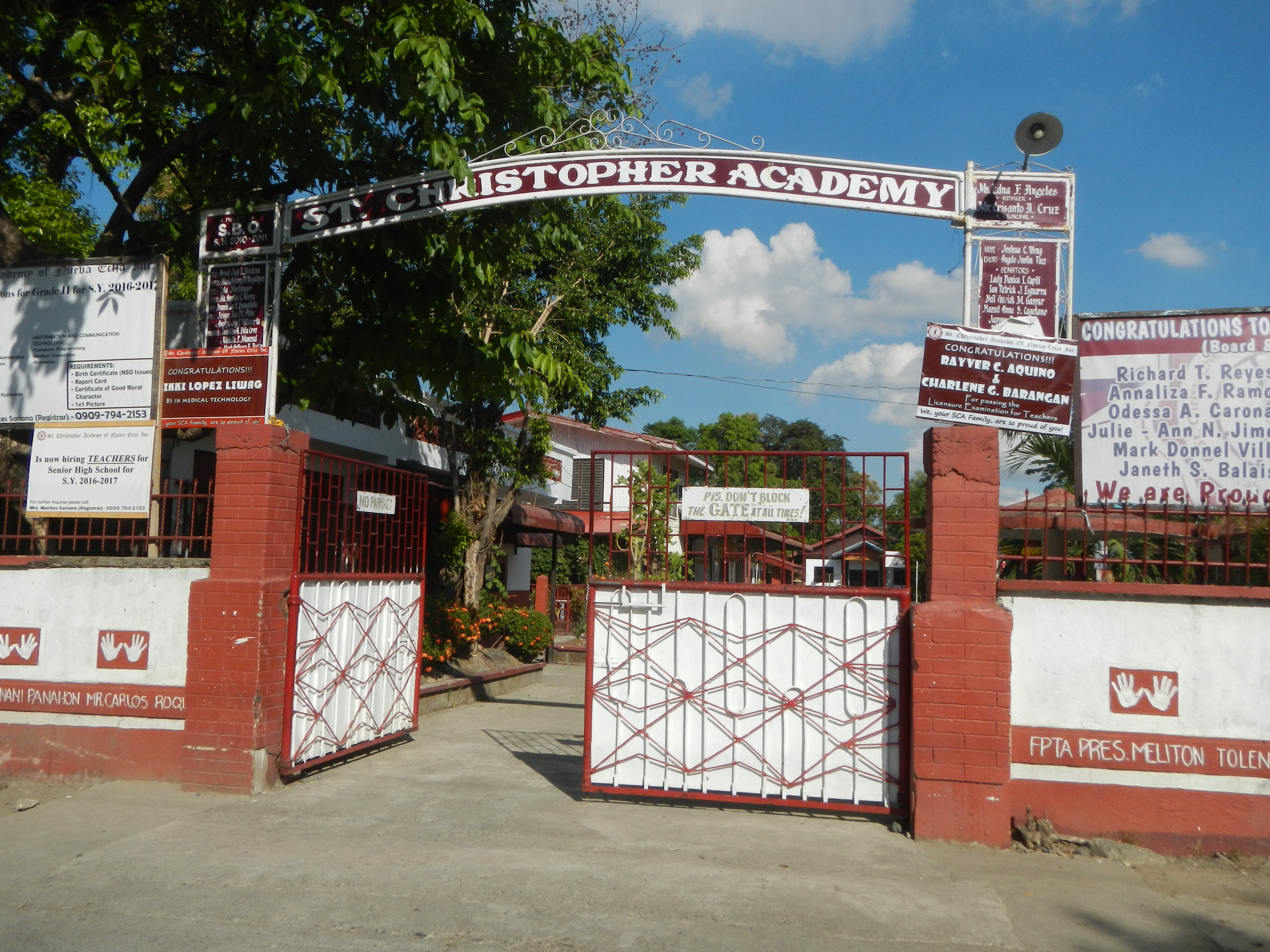
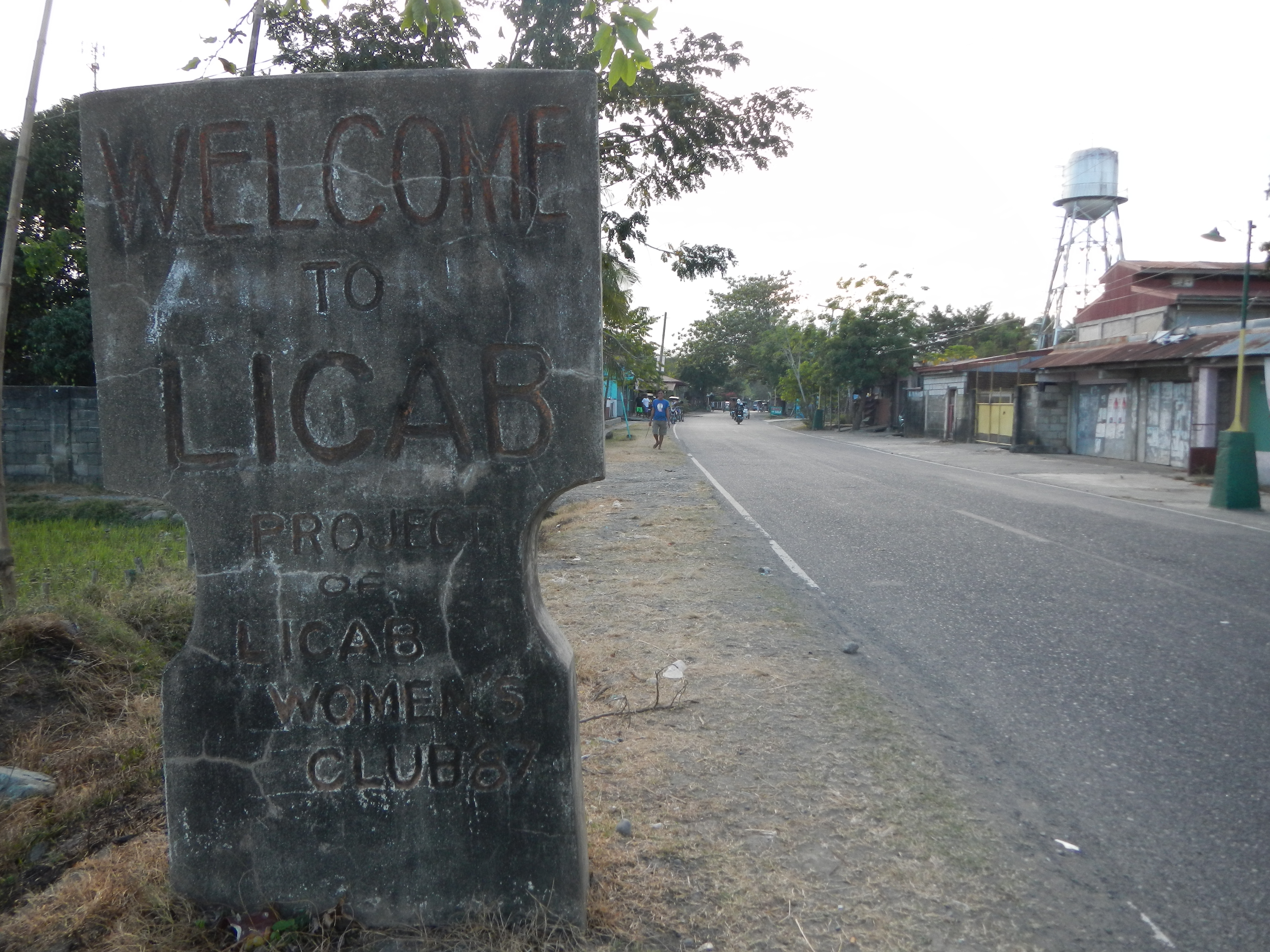
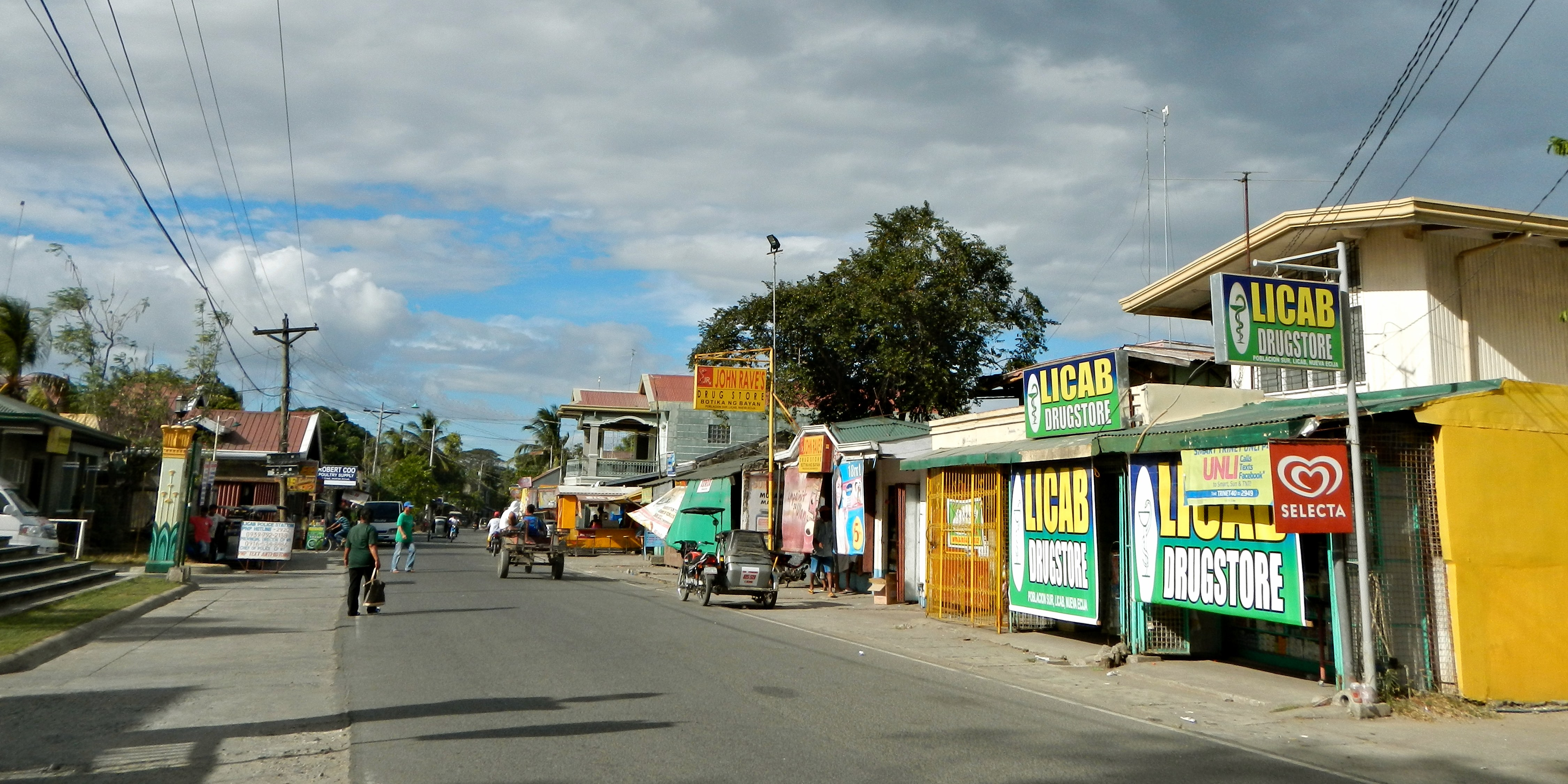
- (From top, left to right): Licab Municipal Hall building, Our Lady of the Holy Rosary Parish, Liwasang Dalmacio, Saint Christopher Academy, Old Town Center Welcome Sign, Downtown area

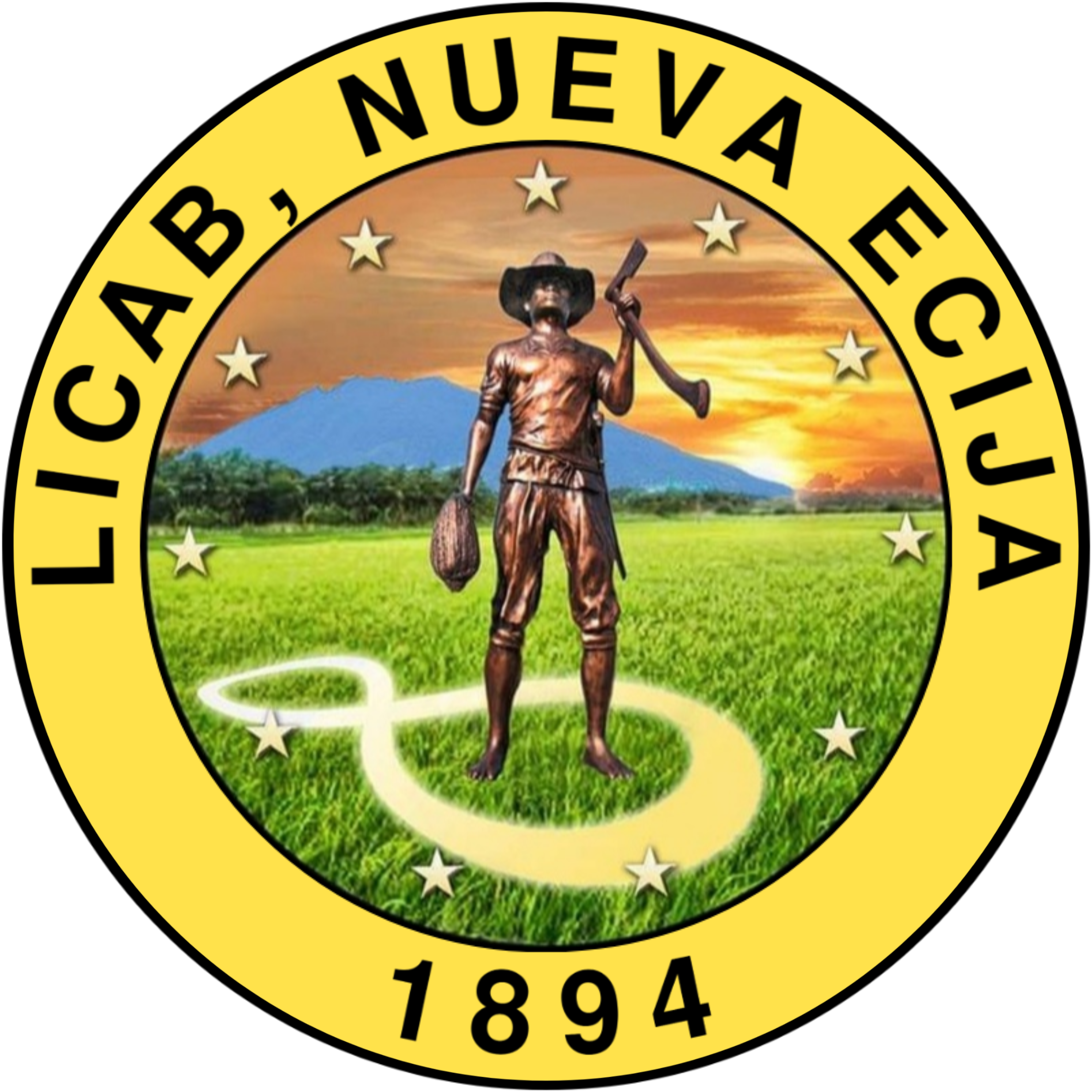
- Seal

- Map of Nueva Ecija with Licab highlighted
- Interactive map of Licab
- Location within the Philippines
- Coordinates: 15°32′24″N 120°45′43″E
- Country: Philippines
- Region: Central Luzon
- Province: Nueva Ecija
- District: 1st district
- Barangays: 11 (see Barangays)

Government
  - Type: Sangguniang Bayan
  - Mayor: Wilfredo S. Domingo
  - Vice Mayor: Oliver A. Villaroman
  - Representative: Mikaela Angela B. Suansing
  - Municipal Council: Members: Oliver A. Villaroman; Reynaldo C. Geronimo; Alejandro B. Miguel; Bayani A. Lopez; Lolito C. Baltazar; Leny B. Ogrimen; Glen J. Llera; Myrla D. Puno
  - Electorate: 18,034 voters (2025)

Area
  - Total: 67.37 km^{2} (26.01 sq mi)
- Elevation: 24 m (79 ft)
- Highest elevation: 38 m (125 ft)
- Lowest elevation: 17 m (56 ft)

Population (2024 census)
  - Total: 29,590
  - Density: 439.2/km^{2} (1,138/sq mi)
  - Households: 7,312

Economy
  - Income class: 3rd municipal income class
  - Poverty incidence: 9.93% (2023)
  - Revenue: ₱ 142.6 million (2024)
  - Assets: ₱ 375.6 million (2024)
  - Expenditure: ₱ 145.8 million (2024)
  - Liabilities: ₱ 153.3 million (2024)

Service provider
  - Electricity: Nueva Ecija 2 Area 1 Electric Cooperative (NEECO 2 A1)
- Time zone: UTC+8 (PST)
- ZIP code: 3112
- PSGC: 0304914000
- IDD : area code: +63 (0)44
- Native languages: Tagalog; Ilocano

Licab, officially the Municipality of Licab (Tagalog: Bayan ng Licab; Ilocano: Ili ti Licab; Pangasinan: Baley na Licab), is a municipality in the province of Nueva Ecija, Philippines. According to the 2024 census, it has a population of 29,590 people.

== History ==
Licab was a sitio under the municipality of Aliaga and was known as "Pulong Samat". A wooded area surrounded by rivers and streams, it was then inhabited by thirty families consisting of Ilocanos, Tagalog, and relatives of the Esguerras from the Ilocos Region. The Esguerra brothers later arrived from San Nicolas, Ilocos Norte and lived with the locals.

Don Dalmacio, one of the Esguerra brothers, led the clearing of the vast grasslands and brushwood with his brothers and the locals, subsequently cultivating the area with a bountiful harvest.

Due to the increase in the population of Pulong Samat, Dalmacio directed the establishment of a "gunglo" which served as Pulong Samat's council or government. The council then worked to change the name of Pulong Samat and later used "Licab" which came from the Ilocano saying "kaskada agliklikab ti ani ti pagay da" which means "the collected rice is flowing", the word likab is the Ilocano term of "flowing".

In 1882, led by Don Dalmacio, the local heads of the barrios of Santa Maria, Licab, Bantog and neighboring sitios, presented a petition to the civil administration of the Spanish government in the Philippines for the establishment of a separate and independent municipality from the Municipality of Aliaga.

After more than ten years and having fulfilled the requirements prescribed by the leaders of the Spanish government in the Philippines, the order to establish the Municipality of Licab was adopted under the leadership of the Governor General Ramón Blanco and took into effect on March 28, 1894.

== Geography ==
About 155 kilometres (96 mi) north of Metro Manila, Licab lies in one of the lowest portions of the province with an average elevation of 24 metres (79 ft), experiencing flooding in all but one of its 11 barangays during rainy season.

=== Barangays ===
Licab is politically subdivided into 11 barangays, as shown below. Each barangay consist of puroks and some have sitios.

PSGC	Barangay	Population			±% p.a.		Area		PD 2024	
		2024		2010			ha	acre	/km^{2}	/sq mi
034914013	Aquino	8.4%	2,476	2,292	▴	0.54%	1,213	2,997	200	530
034914002	Linao	4.7%	1,388	1,210	▴	0.96%	356	880	390	1,000
034914003	Poblacion Norte	4.7%	1,393	1,336	▴	0.29%	77	191	1,800	4,700
034914004	Poblacion Sur	8.7%	2,565	2,483	▴	0.23%	88	216	2,900	7,600
034914005	San Casimiro	11.0%	3,268	2,868	▴	0.91%	407	1,005	800	2,100
034914006	San Cristobal	12.6%	3,721	3,532	▴	0.36%	491	1,214	760	2,000
034914007	San Jose	4.9%	1,449	1,328	▴	0.61%	356	881	410	1,100
034914008	San Juan	12.3%	3,641	3,297	▴	0.69%	932	2,303	390	1,000
034914009	Santa Maria	14.4%	4,249	3,992	▴	0.43%	1,663	4,108	260	660
034914011	Tabing Ilog	3.5%	1,031	869	▴	1.19%	336	829	310	800
034914012	Villarosa	10.4%	3,073	2,980	▴	0.21%	819	2,023	380	970
	Total		29,590	26,187	▴	0.85%	6,737	16,647	440	13

=== Climate ===
Climate data for Licab, Nueva Ecija
Month	Jan	Feb	Mar	Apr	May	Jun	Jul	Aug	Sep	Oct	Nov	Dec	Year
Mean daily maximum °C (°F)	29 (84)	30 (86)	32 (90)	34 (93)	33 (91)	31 (88)	30 (86)	29 (84)	30 (86)	30 (86)	30 (86)	29 (84)	31 (87)
Mean daily minimum °C (°F)	19 (66)	20 (68)	20 (68)	22 (72)	24 (75)	24 (75)	24 (75)	24 (75)	24 (75)	22 (72)	21 (70)	20 (68)	22 (72)
Average precipitation mm (inches)	4 (0.2)	6 (0.2)	7 (0.3)	12 (0.5)	61 (2.4)	89 (3.5)	96 (3.8)	99 (3.9)	81 (3.2)	88 (3.5)	37 (1.5)	13 (0.5)	593 (23.5)
Average rainy days	2.5	3.0	4.1	6.3	15.8	19.4	22.5	21.6	20.1	17.5	9.6	4.0	146.4
Source: Meteoblue (modeled/calculated data, not measured locally)

== Demographics ==
Population census of Licab

Year	Pop.	±% p.a.
1903	6,323	—
1918	7,047	+0.73%
1939	8,348	+0.81%
1948	7,854	−0.68%
1960	8,371	+0.53%
1970	12,193	+3.83%
1975	13,374	+1.87%
1980	14,543	+1.69%

Year	Pop.	±% p.a.
1990	17,202	+1.69%
1995	21,555	+4.32%
2000	21,593	+0.04%
2007	23,675	+1.28%
2010	26,187	+3.74%
2015	28,254	+1.46%
2020	29,269	+0.75%
2024	29,590	+0.26%

Source: Philippine Statistics Authority

== Economy ==
Poverty incidence of Licab (%)

Source: Philippine Statistics Authority

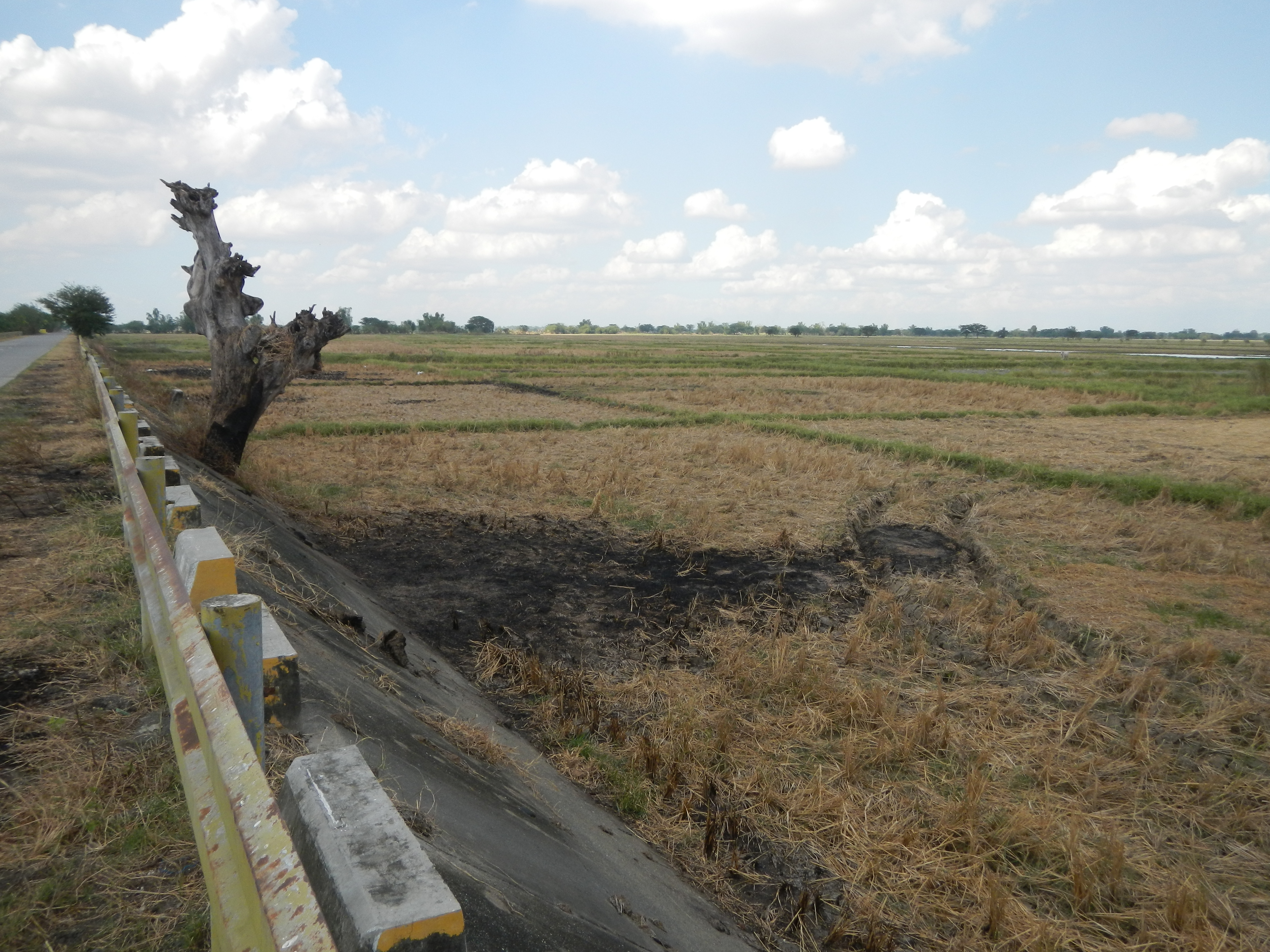
Vast ricefields of Licab

Agriculture has remained the prime industry of the municipality. Agricultural lands devoted to various agricultural activities cover about tens of thousands hectares out of the total provincial area of 550,718 hectares. Rice is still the prime crop of agricultural development and programs. Palay production in the town is boosted by a large network of irrigation facilities and other appurtenant structure.

Live stock production of piggery and poultry were the second agricultural income source in this municipality. Most of the residence were considered to be backyard raisers. Meat products sold in the public market were produced and raised locally.

== Education ==
The Licab Schools District Office governs all educational institutions within the municipality. It oversees the management and operations of all private and public, from primary to secondary schools.

=== Primary and elementary schools ===
- Ablang Elementary School
- Bantug Na Munti Primary School
- Bardias Elementary School
- Don Dalmacio Primary School
- Licab Central School
- Linao Elementary School
- New Life in Christ Academy
- Parson Elementary School
- San Casimiro Elementary School
- San Cristobal Elementary School
- San Jose Elementary School
- St. Christopher Academy
- Sta. Maria Elementary School
- Tabing Ilog Elementary School
- Villarosa Elementary School

=== Secondary schools ===
- Exequiel R. Lina National High School
- Sta. Maria National High School

== Notable personalities ==
- Vic Manuel, basketball player
- Manuel Tinio, army brigade gerenral
