= San Antonio, Nueva Ecija =

Municipality in Nueva Ecija, Philippines

San Antonio Delinquente
- Municipality
- Municipality of San Antonio
- Diocesan Shrine and Parish of Saint Anthony, Abbot San Antonio Municipal Hall San Antonio Town Proper

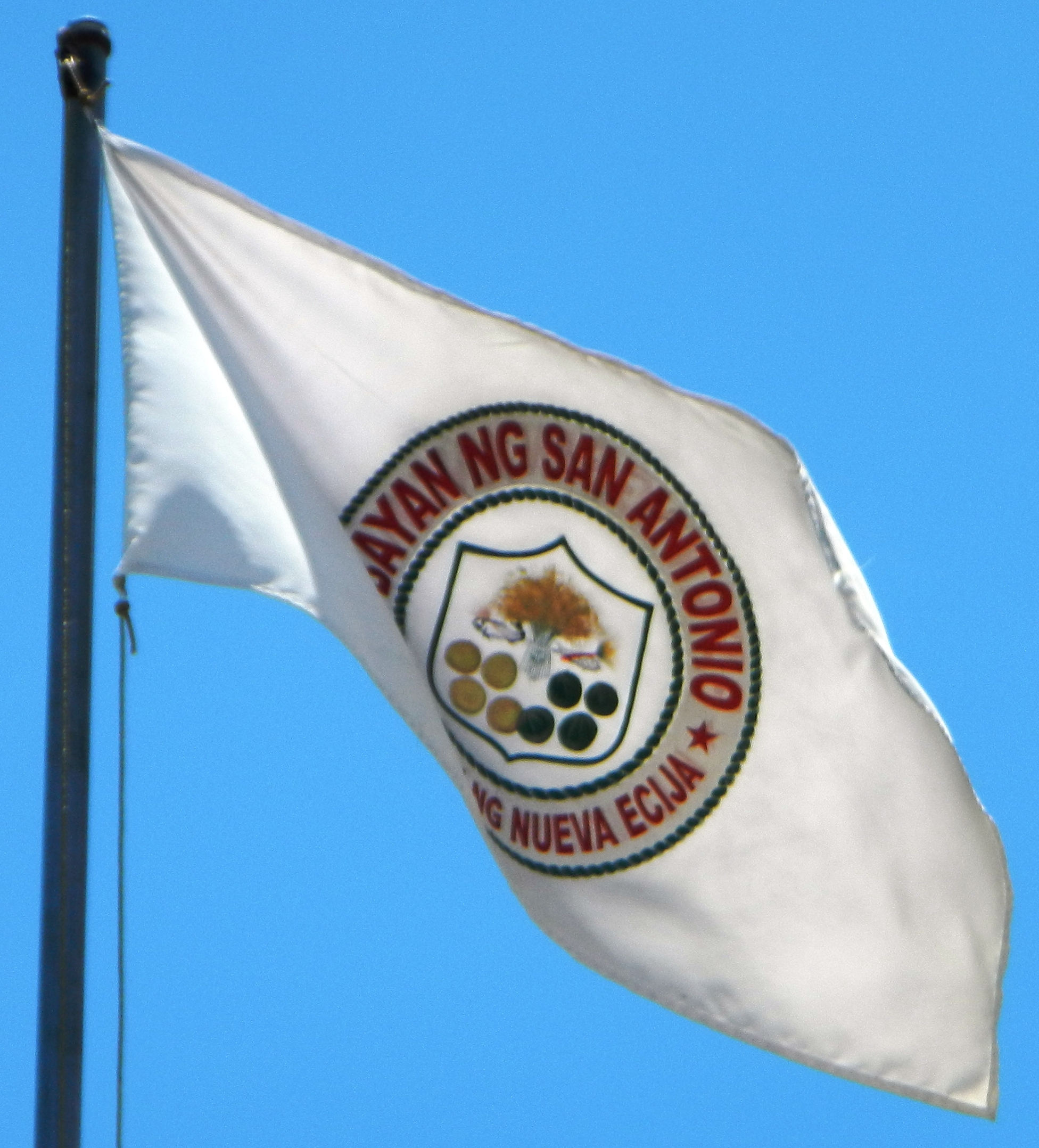
- Flag Seal

- Map of Nueva Ecija with San Antonio highlighted
- Interactive map of San Antonio
- Location within the Philippines
- Coordinates: 15°18′28″N 120°51′12″E
- Country: Philippines
- Region: Central Luzon
- Province: Nueva Ecija
- District: 4th district
- Named for: St. Anthony the Abbot
- Barangays: 16 (see Barangays)

Government
  - Type: Sangguniang Bayan
  - Mayor: Angelita Salonga-Esquivel
  - Vice Mayor: Arvin Cruz Salonga
  - Representative: Emerson D. Pascual
  - Municipal Council: Members: Roberto S. Carpio; Manolito C. Balcos; Daniel Pamintuan; Renier M. Umali; Christopher G. Cunanan; Eduardo Ostares; RC Cruz; Roy V. Juliano
  - Electorate: 57,151 voters (2025)

Area
  - Total: 153.56 km^{2} (59.29 sq mi)
- Elevation: 17 m (56 ft)
- Highest elevation: 32 m (105 ft)
- Lowest elevation: 10 m (33 ft)

Population (2024 census)
  - Total: 84,958
  - Density: 553.26/km^{2} (1,432.9/sq mi)
  - Households: 20,527

Economy
  - Income class: 1st municipal income class
  - Poverty incidence: 13.31% (2023)
  - Revenue: ₱ 330.6 million (2024)
  - Assets: ₱ 1,394 million (2024)
  - Expenditure: ₱ 355.8 million (2024)
  - Liabilities: ₱ 1,009 million (2024)

Service provider
  - Electricity: Nueva Ecija 1 Electric Cooperative (NEECO 1)
- Time zone: UTC+8 (PST)
- ZIP code: 3108
- PSGC: 0304924000
- IDD : area code: +63 (0)44
- Native languages: Kapampangan; Tagalog; Ilocano
- Website: www.sanantonio.gov.ph

San Antonio, officially the Municipality of San Antonio (Tagalog: Bayan ng San Antonio, Kapampangan: Balen ning San Antonio), is a municipality in the province of Nueva Ecija, Philippines. According to the 2024 census, it has a population of 84,958 people.

It is bounded by the towns of Jaen to its eastern side; Zaragosa to the north; Cabiao and San Isidro, and Concepcion in the Province of Tarlac to its west.

== Etymology ==
The present name of the town was given by Father Leocadio Luis, the first priest of the town, in 1843 in honor of its patron saint, San Antonio Abad. Before its organization and recognition as a town by means of a decree promulgated during the Spanish regime, this was a barangay of Gapan and was known as Barrio Delinquente.

== History ==
San Antonio was previously called as the barrio of Delinquente (lit. "outlaw") as residents claimed that the name Delinquente originated from the sinking of a casco (big boat) fully loaded with palay in Pampanga River.

The movement of the separation of Barrio Delinquente from the town of Gapan, and its organization as an independent municipality began in 1839. The petition of the residents of Barrio Delinquente was finally approved in November 1842 but the definite separation from the town of Gapan took place in 1843. San Antonio, along with its mother town of Gapan, Aliaga, Cabiao, and San Isidro were transferred from Pampanga to Nueva Ecija in 1848.

== Geography ==
=== Barangays ===
San Antonio is politically divided into 16 barangays. Each barangay consists of puroks and some have sitios.

- Buliran
- Cama Juan
- Julo
- Lawang Kupang
- Luyos
- Maugat
- Panabingan
- Papaya
- Poblacion
- San Francisco (KC-1) Kaisiwan
- San Jose (Cabungan)
- San Mariano
- Santa Barbara
- Santa Cruz (Parang)
- Santo Cristo
- Tikiw

=== Climate ===
Climate data for San Antonio, Nueva Ecija
Month	Jan	Feb	Mar	Apr	May	Jun	Jul	Aug	Sep	Oct	Nov	Dec	Year
Mean daily maximum °C (°F)	28 (82)	30 (86)	31 (88)	33 (91)	33 (91)	31 (88)	30 (86)	29 (84)	29 (84)	30 (86)	30 (86)	29 (84)	30 (86)
Mean daily minimum °C (°F)	20 (68)	20 (68)	20 (68)	22 (72)	24 (75)	24 (75)	24 (75)	24 (75)	24 (75)	23 (73)	22 (72)	21 (70)	22 (72)
Average precipitation mm (inches)	4 (0.2)	4 (0.2)	5 (0.2)	11 (0.4)	66 (2.6)	99 (3.9)	127 (5.0)	113 (4.4)	99 (3.9)	84 (3.3)	35 (1.4)	14 (0.6)	661 (26.1)
Average rainy days	2.2	1.9	3.2	5.3	16.1	20.8	23.5	22.8	22.2	16.5	8.9	3.5	146.9
Source: Meteoblue

== Demographics ==
Population census of San Antonio

Year	Pop.	±% p.a.
1903	6,343	—
1918	10,395	+3.35%
1939	18,084	+2.67%
1948	16,518	−1.00%
1960	25,668	+3.74%
1970	33,862	+2.81%
1975	38,063	+2.37%
1980	42,969	+2.45%

Year	Pop.	±% p.a.
1990	51,815	+1.89%
1995	56,130	+1.51%
2000	63,672	+2.74%
2007	67,446	+0.80%
2010	73,074	+2.96%
2015	77,836	+1.21%
2020	83,060	+1.38%
2024	84,958	+0.54%

Source: Philippine Statistics Authority

== Economy ==
Poverty incidence of San Antonio (%)

Source: Philippine Statistics Authority

== Government ==
=== Local government ===
Municipal elected official (2025–present):

- Mayor
  - Angelita Salonga-Esquivel
- Vice Mayor
  - Arvin Cruz Salonga
- Councilors:
  - Arvin Carl Salonga
  - Daniel Pamintuan
  - Rowena Umali
  - Winkle Sulit
  - Honorio Garces
  - Roy Juliano
  - Eduardo Ostarez
  - RC Cruz

== Education ==
San Antonio Central School

The San Antonio Schools District Office governs all educational institutions within the municipality. It oversees the management and operations of all private and public, from primary to secondary schools.

=== Primary and elementary schools ===
- Buliran Elementary School
- Cama Juan Elementary School
- Faustino P. De Leon Elementary School
- Hacienda Elementary School
- Lawang Kupang Elementary School
- Lorenza M. Tinio Elementary School
- Luyos Christian Academy
- Luyos Elementary School
- Maugat Elementary School
- Panabingan Elementary School
- Papaya Elementary School
- San Antonio Central School
- San Antonio Montessori School
- San Francisco Elementary School
- San Mariano East Elementary School
- Sanggalang Elementary School
- St. Joseph Academy
- St. Paul School
- Sta. Barbara (North) Elementary School
- Sta. Barbara South Elementary School
- Sto. Cristo East Elementary School
- Sto. Cristo West Elementary School
- Tikiw Elementary School
- Trinity Sto. Cristo Education Center

=== Secondary schools ===
- Dr. Jose Lapuz Salonga High School
- San Antonio High School
- San Francisco National High School
- San Mariano National High School
- Sta. Barbara National High School
- Zacarias C. Aquilizan High School
- St.Paul School of San Antonio

== Notable personalities ==
- Bella Flores - Philippine Cinema's "Queen of Kontrabidas"
- Chanel Olive Thomas
- Anthony Taberna - broadcast journalist

== Gallery ==
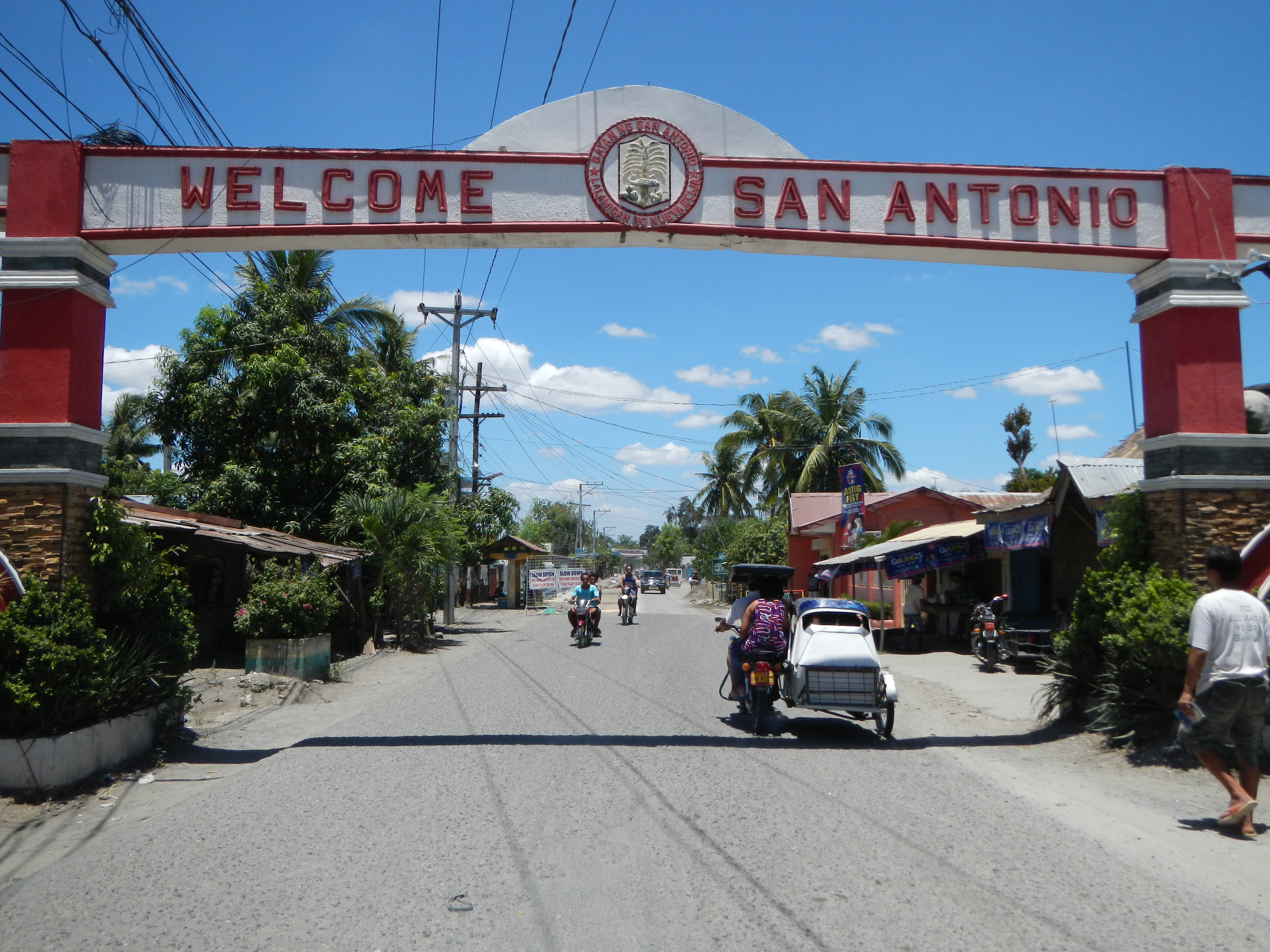
Welcome arch

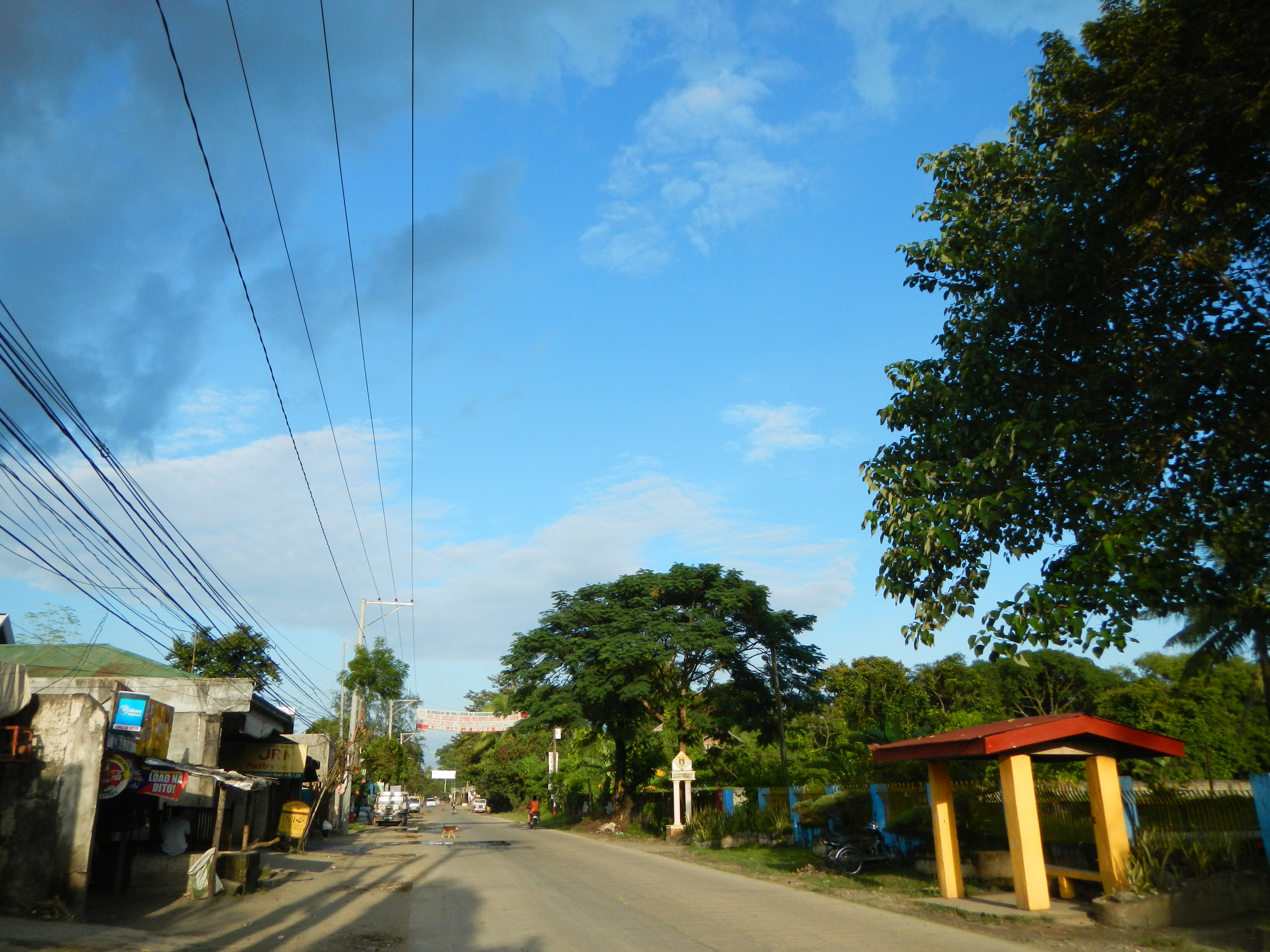
Highway

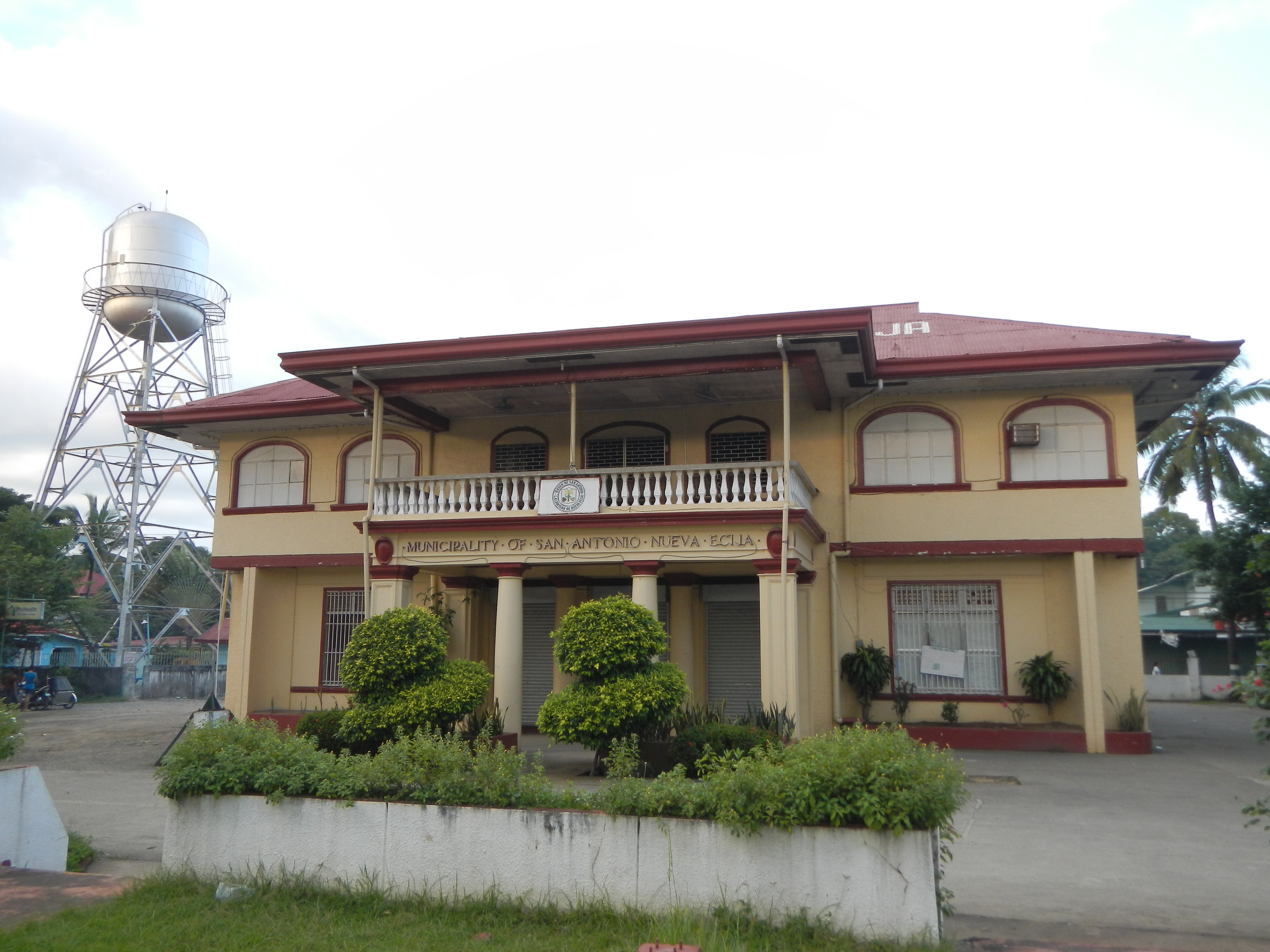
Town hall

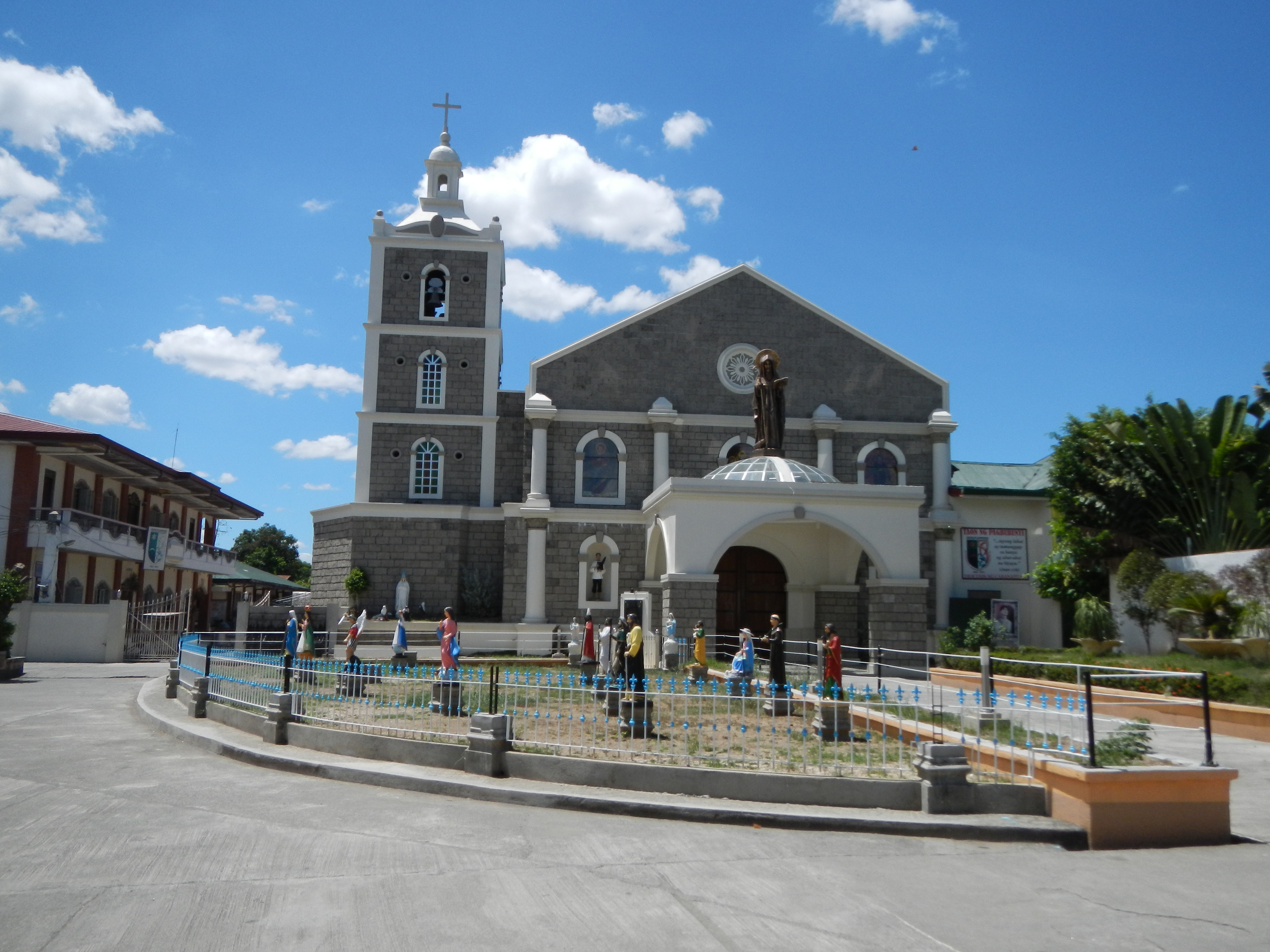
Saint Anthony Abbot Parish Church

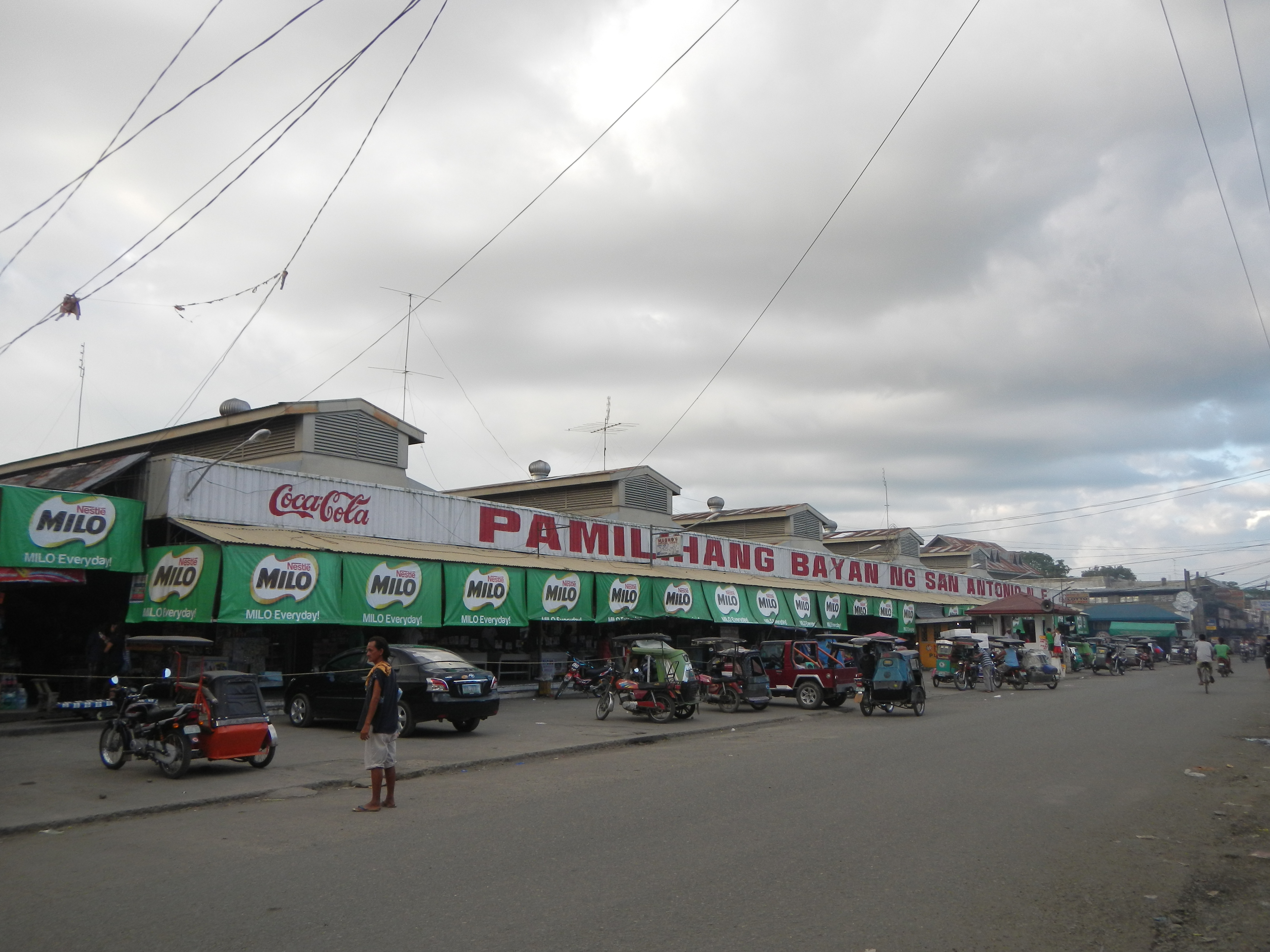
Public Market
