= Zaragoza, Nueva Ecija =

Municipality in Nueva Ecija, Philippines

Zaragoza
- Municipality
- Municipality of Zaragoza
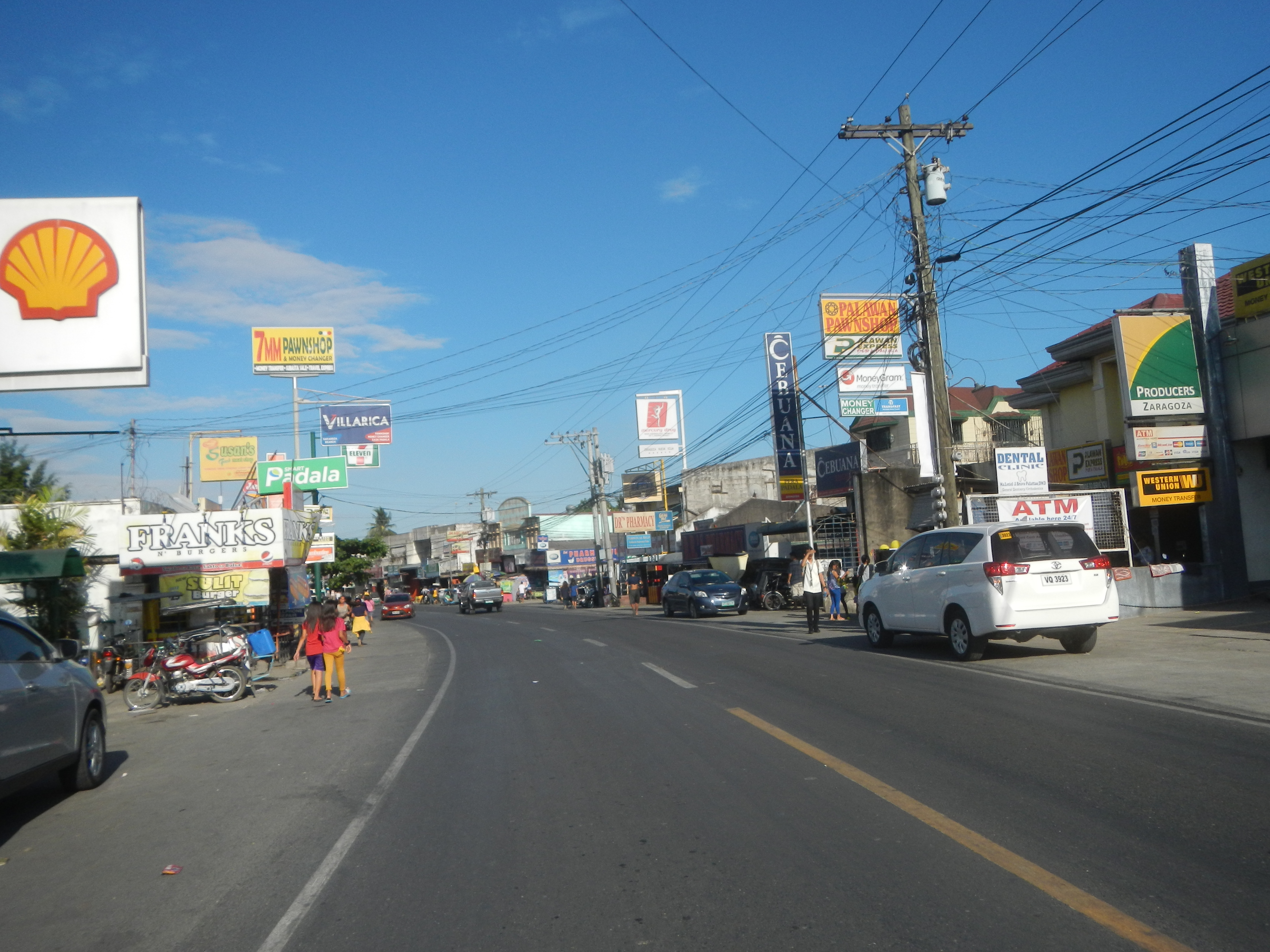
- Downtown

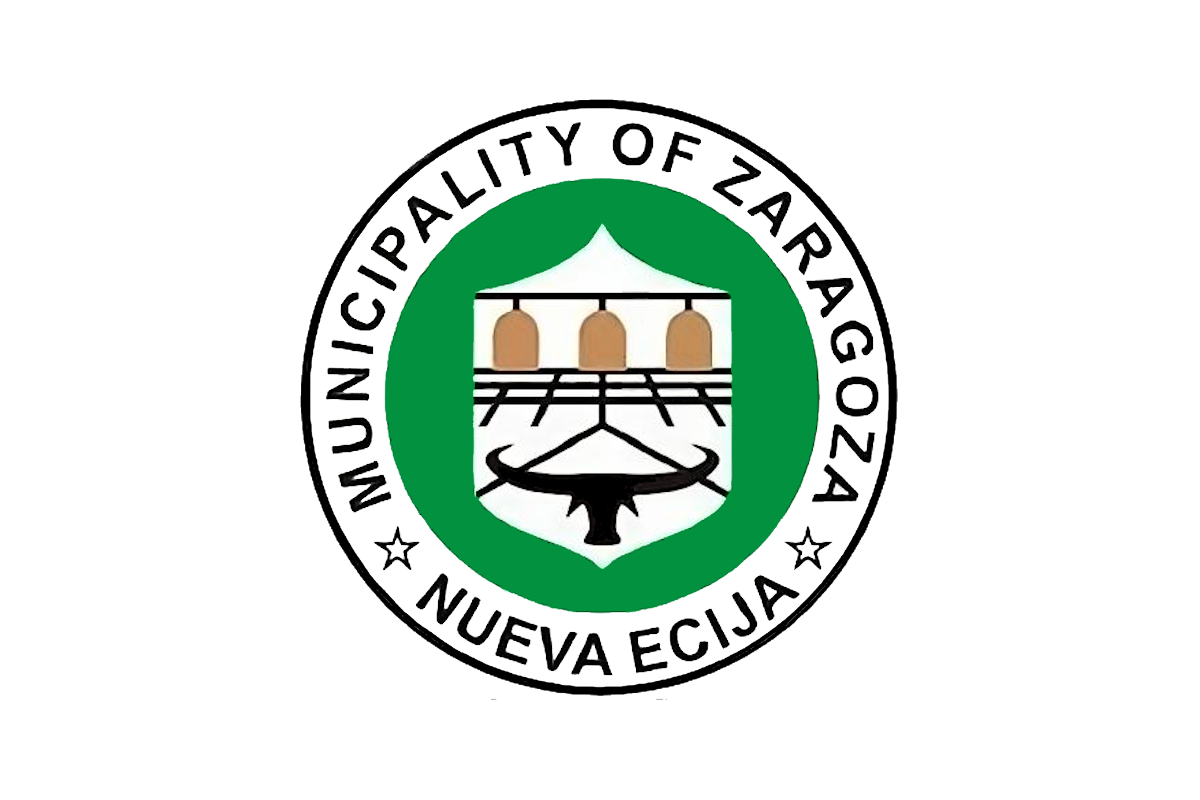
- Flag Seal

- Map of Nueva Ecija with Zaragoza highlighted
- Interactive map of Zaragoza
- Location within the Philippines
- Coordinates: 15°26′57″N 120°47′36″E
- Country: Philippines
- Region: Central Luzon
- Province: Nueva Ecija
- District: 1st district
- Named for: Zaragoza, Aragon, Spain
- Barangays: 19 (see Barangays)

Government
  - Type: Sangguniang Bayan
  - Mayor: Lovella DG. Belmonte-Espiritu
  - Vice Mayor: Edwin A. Buendia
  - Representative: Mikaela Angela B. Suansing

Area
  - Total: 72.02 km^{2} (27.81 sq mi)
- Elevation: 20 m (66 ft)
- Highest elevation: 34 m (112 ft)
- Lowest elevation: 14 m (46 ft)

Population (2024 census)
  - Total: 55,657
  - Density: 772.8/km^{2} (2,002/sq mi)
  - Households: 13,352

Economy
  - Income class: 1st municipal income class
  - Poverty incidence: 10.88% (2023)
  - Revenue: ₱ 229 million (2024)
  - Assets: ₱ 582.8 million (2024)
  - Expenditure: ₱ 216.4 million (2024)
  - Liabilities: ₱ 182.3 million (2024)

Service provider
  - Electricity: Tarlac 2 Electric Cooperative (TARELCO 2)
- Time zone: UTC+8 (PST)
- ZIP code: 3110
- PSGC: 0304932000
- IDD : area code: +63 (0)44
- Native languages: Tagalog; Ilocano

Zaragoza, officially the Municipality of Zaragoza (Tagalog: Bayan ng Zaragoza, Ilocano: Ili ti Zaragoza), is a municipality in the province of Nueva Ecija, Philippines. According to the 2024 census, it has a population of 55,657 people.

== Etymology ==
The town derived its name from the Zaragoza in Aragon, Spain.

== History ==
The present official name of the town is Zaragoza. The original name of the poblacion was Mangga-a-lakay, an Ilocano term which means "Old Mango Tree". Dating at the early part of the nineteenth century, it was made a barrio, a part of the old town of Aliaga, in 1864, with the name San Vicente in honor of its patron saint, Saint Vincent. It was made a town in 1878 with the barrios of San Vicente, Del Carmen, and Pinangkalatan taken together. Due to the special effort made by Don Francisco Mas, a Spaniard, in making the community a town, the name "ZARAGOZA" was given to the newly created town in honor of the home city of Don Francisco.

The first settlers of Zaragoza came from Batac, Ilocos Norte. Among them were Mr. Manuel Almayda, Mr. Maximiano Belza, Mr. Jose Veloso, Mr. Marcos Banoza, Mr. Antonio (alias) Sangley. The organizers of the barrio of San Vicente which is the grassroot and poblacion of the town were the following prominent persons: Fr. Andres Alcantara, Capt. Hipolito Madamba, Capt. Tranquilino Acosta, Capt. Mariano Belza, and Capt. (alias) Sangley.

Through the untiring efforts of Capts. Hipolito Madamba, Tranquilino Acosta, Mariano Belza, Antonio (alias) Sangley, Atty. Francisco Mas and others, the barrio of San Vicente, Del Carmen and Pinangkalatan were made a town with the name of Zaragoza.

Zaragoza, now a prosperous town began from a place of forests and pampas. There was nothing that could be seen in the place but big trees of different kinds. In places where no trees could be found, pampas and different kinds of grass were in abundance. It is in these places where some Igorots could be found roaming around with no fixed homes. These Igorots moved from one place to another and were entirely dependent upon fruits of wild trees, wild pigs and birds for their food. In some places the Igorots made fixed homes and they tilled the cleared lands called “kaingins”.

These Igorots little by little were banishing from their places as emigrants from Ilocanos came in big numbers during the beginning of the 19th century. As Igorot would not like to mingle with the Christian emigrant, these Ilocanos took advantage of occupying the kaingins already started by the Igorots.

Because the Ilocos region is densely populated and has limited arable land, many Ilocanos migrated to other parts of Luzon. After a drought in [year], a number of Ilocano families left the region for Central Luzon.

Some stopped at Pangasinan, others in Tarlac and many more others in Nueva Ecija, which was considered as a land of plenty. Included in this caravan of Ilocano emigrants was the group of families of Manuel Almeida, MaximianoBelza, Jose Veloso, Marcos Benoza,Antonio (alias) Sang-ley and others who came from Batac, Ilocos Norte. These people started their lives in a place which they then called "Gudnaurdan" which is the present site of the barrio of San Isidro. The second place which another group of families inhabited was a place which was later on called "Pugo", where plenty of bamboo stumps could be found and inhabited by a very big flock of birds called quail or "pugo" in Tagalog. The third place inhabited by another group of families was in a place they called as "Mangga a-Lakay (Old mango tree) which is now the poblacion of the town. The next place inhabited by these daring Ilocanos was in a place where the people planted plenty of bananas and which was later called "sagingan" (banana groves).

The Ilocanos who have emigrated to Zaragoza worked hard and not long their efforts were rewarded with a very bountiful harvest. They lived so progressively and prosperously that many people from other places as Bulacan, Ilocos region heard of this prosperity. Many more Ilocanos emigrated to this place. Not long also, Tagalogs from Bulacan emigrated to this place thereby increasing the people of the place. With such a big number of people now in the place, many more virgin lands were opened, commerce improved. Such a condition brought prosperity among the people and the place progressed, thereby calling the interest of the church. This forced Andres Alcantara to work hard for the conversion of this small sitio into a barrio. It was not long, that an order came down for the Governor General, making this place a barrio of San Vicente and to be a part of old town of Aliaga, Nueva Ecija.

Because of the fast progress of the barrio of San Vicente in terms of economics, many more people migrated to this place making possible more virgin lands to be cultivated and many more places being inhabited. This brought about more prosperity among the people and the barrio.

One day in a meeting of the old folks of the barrio, they made a resolution petitioning the authorities concerned that the two barrios of San Vicente and del Carmen be converted into a town. The resolution was presented in 1877 which was disapproved on the ground that the two barrios still lack the number of persons to make them into a town as these were only all in all 700 persons.

The sacrificing and tireless old folks of the place led by Hipolito Madamba, Tranquilino Acosta, Mariano Balsa, Antonio (alias) Sangley and many other prominent persons again presented a resolution in 1878 requesting that the barrios of del Carmen, San Vicente and Pinangkalan be converted into a town. The fusion of Pinangkalan with the two barrios enlarged the sizes of the proposed town and its population increased too.

With the untiring help of Mr. Francisco Nas, the barrio people presented their resolution to the Governor General and luckily their petition was granted and approved. Thus the creation of the town of Zaragoza. Not long after that, the creation of the town of Zaragoza was published in the Official Gazette. After 3 months, the Civil Governor of Nueva Ecija issued out a signed order that within 17 days, the newly created town should prepare to appoint or elect the officer who will run the local government. In a meeting held by the town people, Mr. Hipolito Madamba after a heated contest with Mr. Tranquilino Acosta was proclaimed the head of the newly created town. After the elapse of the 15 days granted the people to select the officials, the provincial governor came to San Vicente to inaugurate the new gobernadorcillo in the person of Mr. Hipolito Madamba.

Those who followed as gobernadorcillo of Zaragoza after Capt. Madamba were as follows. Included with these were also the different municipal officials, who worked hand in hand for the welfare to the town.

== Geography ==
Zaragoza is located at the southern edge of Nueva Ecija bordering the town of La Paz, Tarlac which, due to its proximity, is more closely economically coherent with each other. The newly opened Subic–Clark–Tarlac Expressway (SCTEX) ends up in La Paz where it connects to the Santa Rosa-Tarlac Road passing through Zaragoza and Santa Rosa going to Cabanatuan and on to the Pan-Philippine Highway to Tuguegarao, Cagayan.

Zaragoza is bounded by the municipalities of San Antonio and Jaen to the south, Santa Rosa to its east, Aliaga and Licab to the north and La Paz, Tarlac is located west. It is 25 kilometres (16 mi) from Cabanatuan, 39 kilometres (24 mi) from Palayan, and 123 kilometres (76 mi) from Manila.

=== Barangays ===
Zaragoza is politically subdivided into 19 barangays, as shown below. Each barangay consists of puroks and some have sitios.

- Batitang
- Carmen
- Concepcion
- Del Pilar
- General Luna
- H. Romero
- Macarse
- Manaol
- Mayamot
- Pantoc
- San Vicente (Poblacion)
- San Isidro
- San Rafael
- Santa Cruz
- Santa Lucia Old
- Santa Lucia Young
- Santo Rosario Old (Valdez matanda)
- Santo Rosario Young (Valdez bata)
- Valeriana

=== Climate ===
Climate data for Zaragoza, Nueva Ecija
Month	Jan	Feb	Mar	Apr	May	Jun	Jul	Aug	Sep	Oct	Nov	Dec	Year
Mean daily maximum °C (°F)	28 (82)	30 (86)	31 (88)	33 (91)	33 (91)	31 (88)	30 (86)	29 (84)	29 (84)	30 (86)	30 (86)	29 (84)	30 (86)
Mean daily minimum °C (°F)	20 (68)	20 (68)	20 (68)	22 (72)	24 (75)	24 (75)	24 (75)	24 (75)	24 (75)	23 (73)	22 (72)	21 (70)	22 (72)
Average precipitation mm (inches)	4 (0.2)	4 (0.2)	5 (0.2)	11 (0.4)	66 (2.6)	99 (3.9)	127 (5.0)	113 (4.4)	99 (3.9)	84 (3.3)	35 (1.4)	14 (0.6)	661 (26.1)
Average rainy days	2.2	1.9	3.2	5.3	16.1	20.8	23.5	22.8	22.2	16.5	8.9	3.5	146.9
Source: Meteoblue

== Demographics ==
Population census of Zaragoza

Year	Pop.	±% p.a.
1903	4,025	—
1918	6,074	+2.78%
1939	9,292	+2.05%
1948	14,088	+4.73%
1960	15,191	+0.63%
1970	19,596	+2.58%
1975	21,598	+1.97%
1980	24,418	+2.48%

Year	Pop.	±% p.a.
1990	28,743	+1.64%
1995	33,826	+3.10%
2000	37,645	+2.32%
2007	40,355	+0.96%
2010	44,124	+3.30%
2015	49,387	+2.17%
2020	53,090	+1.53%
2024	55,657	+1.14%

Source: Philippine Statistics Authority

== Economy ==
Poverty incidence of Zaragoza (%)

Source: Philippine Statistics Authority

Zaragoza is an agricultural municipality in Nueva Ecija. It is located in Western part of Nueva Ecija bounded with the municipality of La Paz in Tarlac. The main economic resource of the people of Zaragoza is mainly agricultural and rice production. Duck-raising is also a notable industry. The town's public market is also the main center of commerce for a number of barangays in the neighbouring towns.

Status of economic performance boost rapidly due to commercialization and services. More investors and businesses opened that provide their constituent an opportunity to generate jobs. Zaragoza is also the center for financing and banking purposes; basic needed not only for their community, but also to their neighboring towns of Licab, Aliaga and Quezon in Nueva Ecija and La Paz in Tarlac province.

== Transportation ==
Zaragoza has many bus companies operating provincial and regional routes. Much of the town's population rely on public transportation such as tricycles and jeeps to get around. The jeepney was patterned after U.S. Army jeeps and have been in use since the years immediately following World War II.

Jeepney operators serve routes within the province with some reaching as far to Tarlac City. Tricycle operators serve local routes and sometimes to the nearby towns of Aliaga and San Antonio.

Intercity and interprovincial buses from Manila serve the city, and are usually operated by Baliwag Transit, Inc., Five Star, Victory Liner, ES Transport Inc., and Pangasinan Solid North.

=== Expressway and Toll Roads ===
Zaragoza is accessible via the Central Luzon Link Expressway (CLLEX), which directly connects the town to the national expressway network. The main access roads to Zaragoza include the Santa Rosa–Tarlac Road, Zaragoza-Aliaga Road, Zaragoza-San Antonio Road, and Carmen-Cabanatuan Road.

== Government ==
=== Local government ===
Pursuant to the Local government in the Philippines, the political seat of the municipal government is located at the Municipal Town Hall. In the History of the Philippines (1521–1898), the Gobernadorcillo is the Chief Executive who holds office in the Presidencia. During the American rule (1898–1946) (History of the Philippines (1898-1946)), the elected Mayor and local officials, including the appointed ones hold office at the Municipal Town Hall. The legislative and executive departments are vested in the Sangguniang Bayan (Session Hall) and Municipal Trial Court, located in the Town Hall.

Zaragoza's incumbent Mayor is Lovella "Lally" Belmonte-Espiritu and the Vice Mayor Edwin A. Buendia

== Tourism ==
Zaragoza's main attractions are: the Welcome arch, the scenic rice fields, the Town Hall, the Monument of Zaragoza Heroes, Don Cirilo B. Acosta Elementary School and the St. Vincent Ferrer Parish Church, initially constructed in 1849.

=== St. Vincent Ferrer Parish Church ===
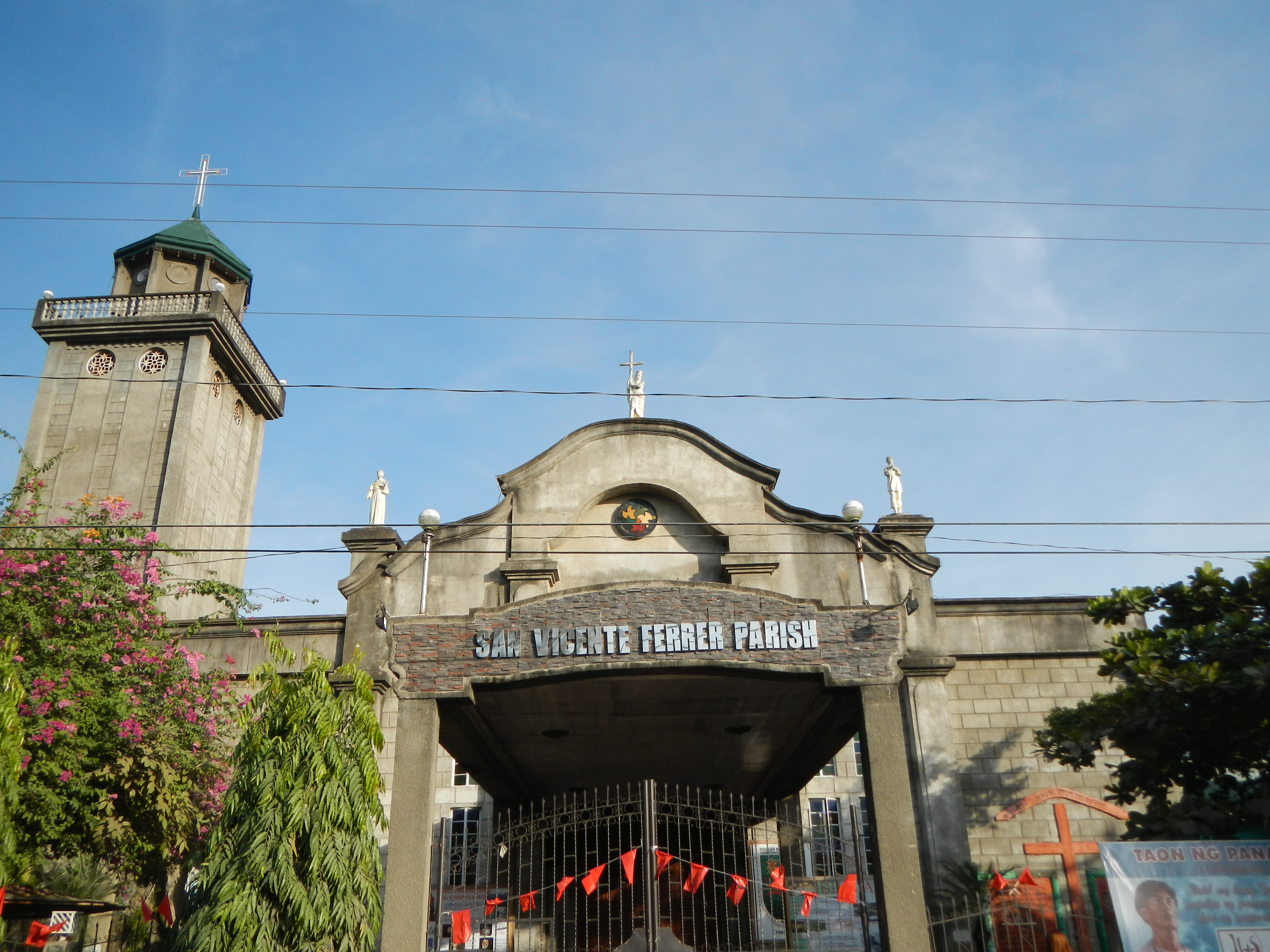
St. Vincent Ferrer Parish Church

The 1849 St. Vincent Ferrer Parish Church belongs to the Roman Catholic Diocese of Cabanatuan (Dioecesis of Cabanatuanensi, Suffragan of Lingayen-Dagupan, comprising 16 towns of Southern Nueva Ecija, Cabanatuan, Palayan City and Gapan; Titular: St. Nicholas of Tolentine, September 10; Most Reverend Sofronio A. Bancud, SSS, DD, located at Poblacion, Zaragoza, 3110 Nueva Ecija; Titular: St. Vincent Ferrer, Feast is April 5).

Its Parish Priest is Fr. Nezelle O. Lirio. Priests in Residence include Rev. Fr. Joseph B. Azarcon (School Director)Feast, The Feast day is April 5.

On December 30, 2000, the renovated and rehabilitated Church facade, belfry, baptismal font, vestry, Rectory, Room of the Saints by were blessed by Bishop Sofio Guinto Balce † (11 Nov 1990 Succeeded - 25 Jun 2004 Died).

Saint Vincent Ferrer (23 January 1350 – 5 April 1419) was a Valencian Dominican friar, who gained acclaim as a missionary and a logician. He is honored as a saint of the Catholic Church.

== Education ==
The Zaragoza Schools District Office governs all educational institutions within the municipality. It oversees the management and operations of all private and public, from primary to secondary schools.

=== Primary and elementary schools ===
- Agape Ecumenical School
- Alyssa Claire Learning Center
- Batitang Elementary School
- Blueridge Christian School
- Carmen Elementary School
- Concepcion East Elementary School
- Concepcion West Elementary School
- Don Cirilo B. Acosta Elementary School
- F.B. Mesina Elementary School
- Felicidad V. Buendia Elementary School
- Gen. Luna Elementary School
- Manaol Elementary School
- Mayamot Elementary School
- San Isidro Elementary School
- Sta. Cruz Elementary School
- Sta. Lucia (O) Elementary School
- Sta. Lucia (Y) Elementary School
- Sto. Rosario (Y) Elementary School
- Vincentian Catholic Academy
- Zaragoza Central School
- Zaragoza Christian Academy

=== Secondary schools ===
- Batitang National High School
- Carmen National High School
- Emilia Belmonte Acosta National High School
- Zaragoza National High School
- Zaragoza Senior High School
- Vincentian Catholic Academy Inc.

== Gallery ==
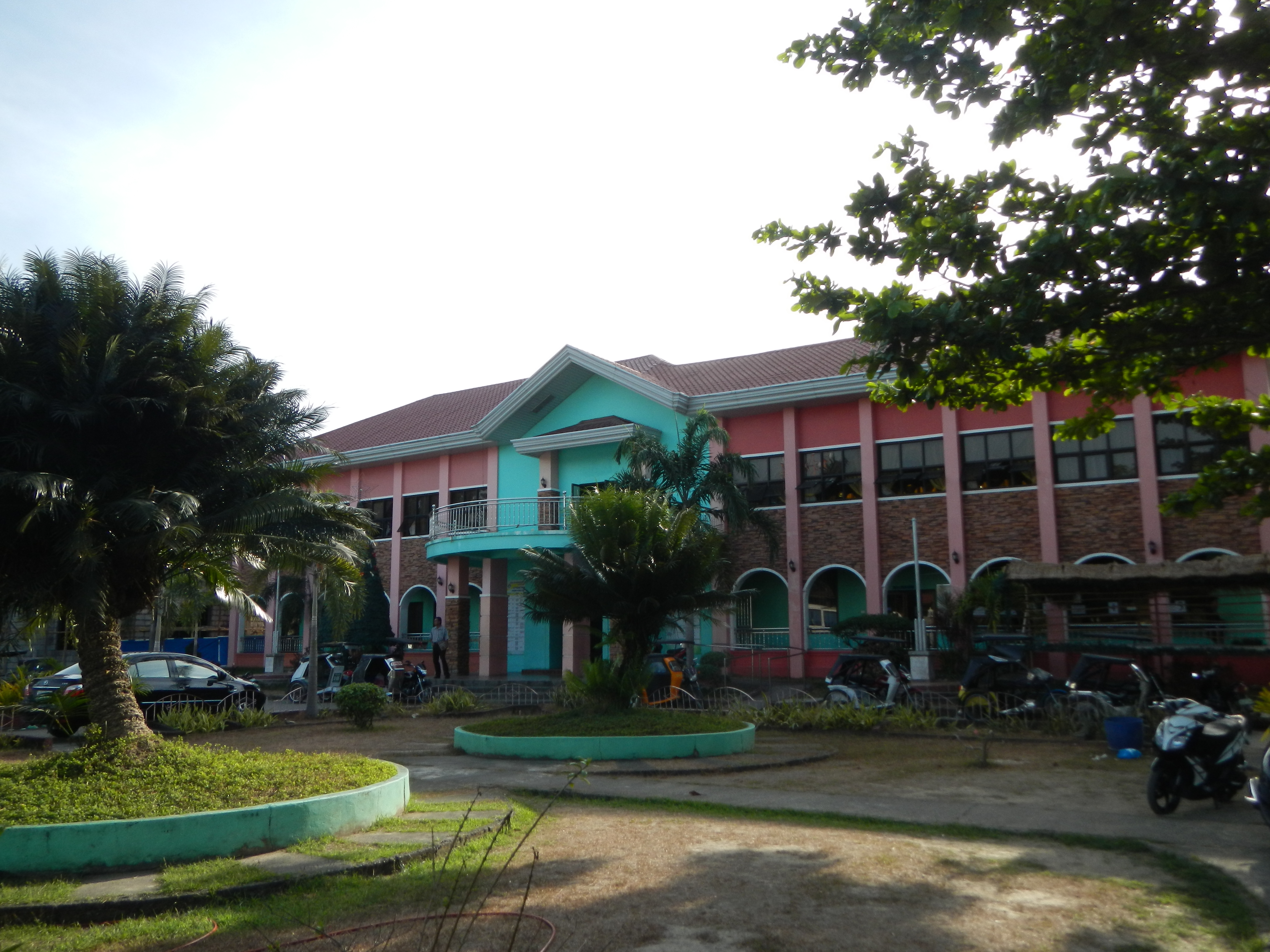
Town Hall

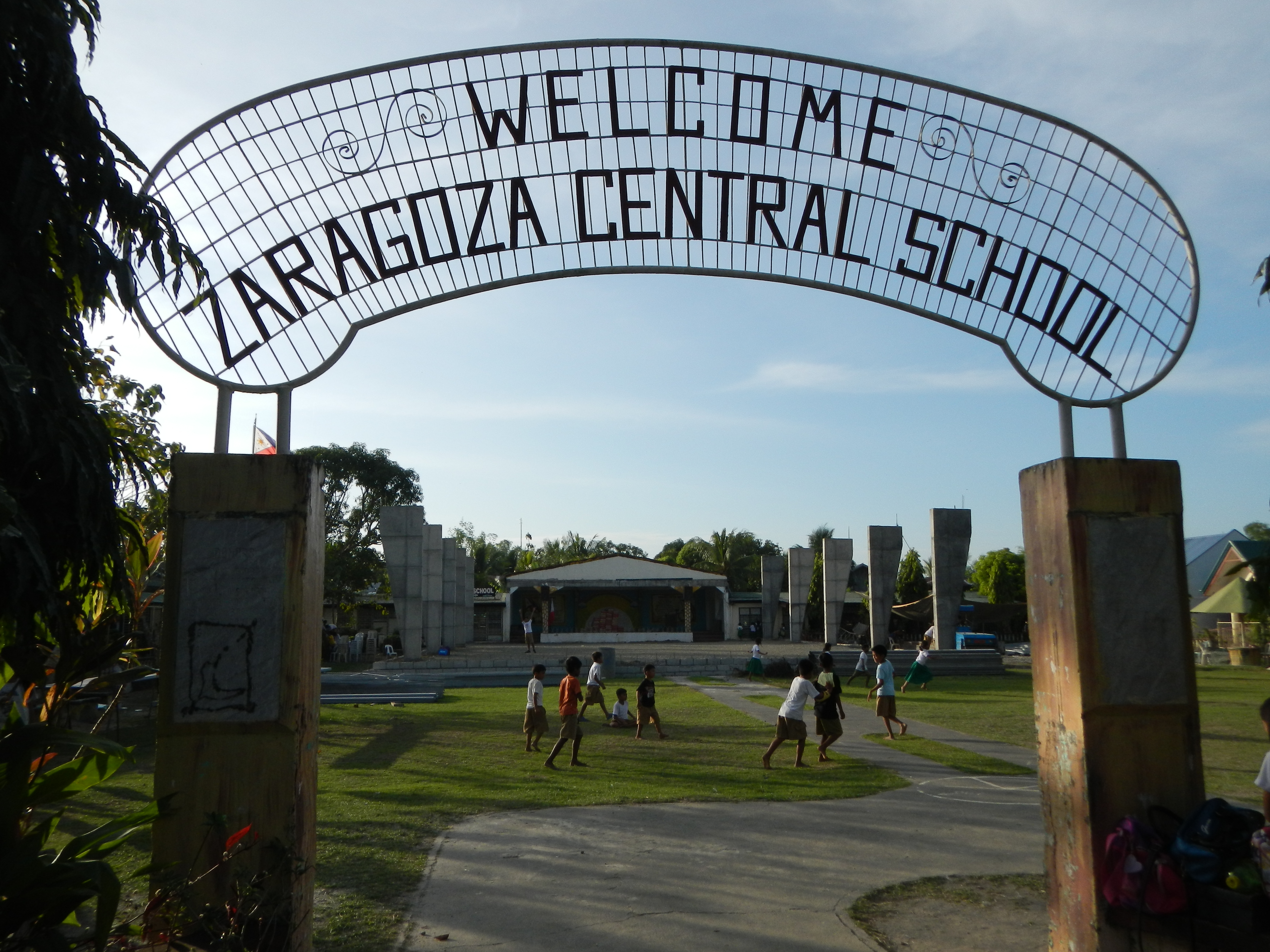
Zaragoza Central School

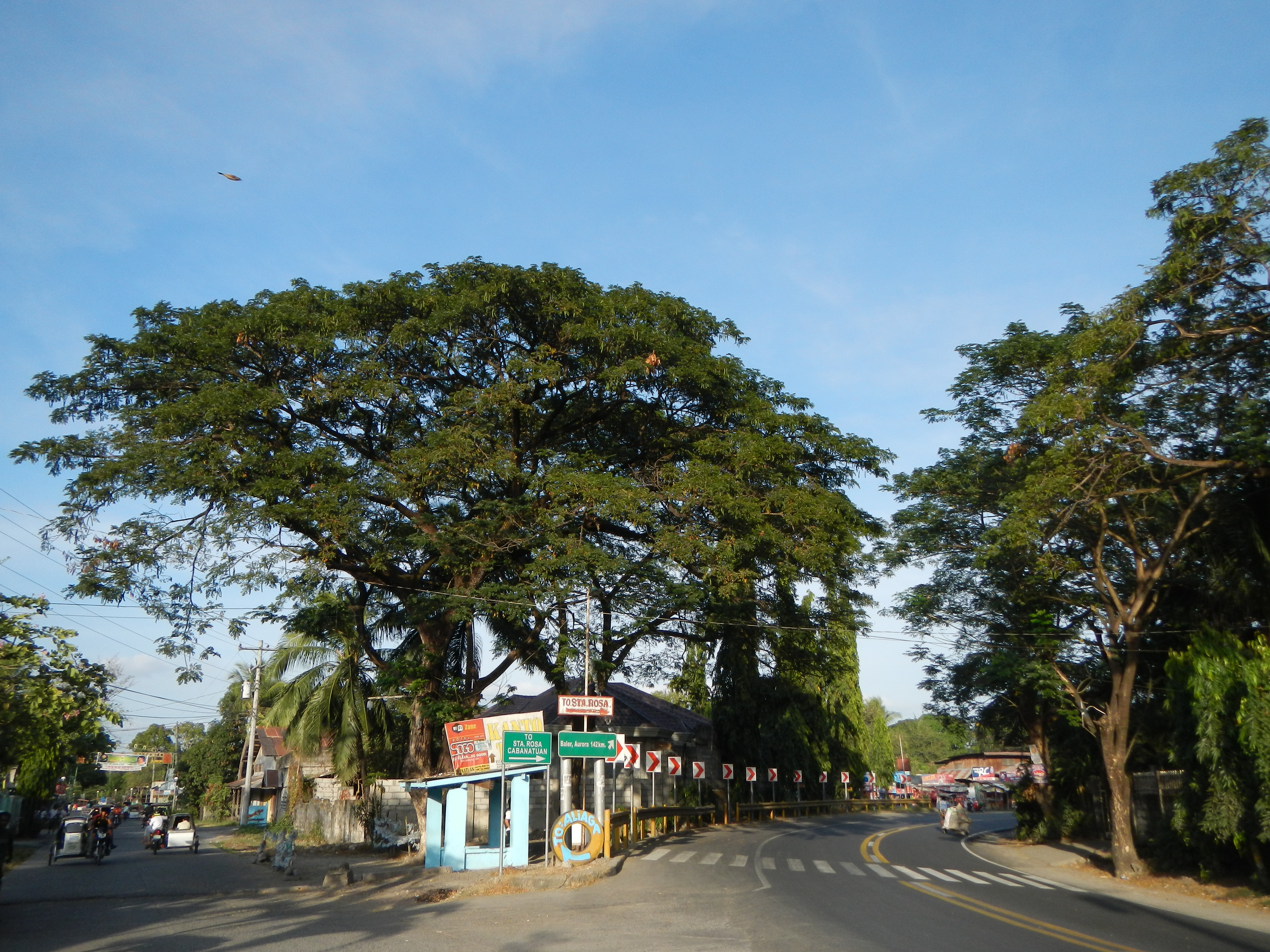
Junction, Crossing

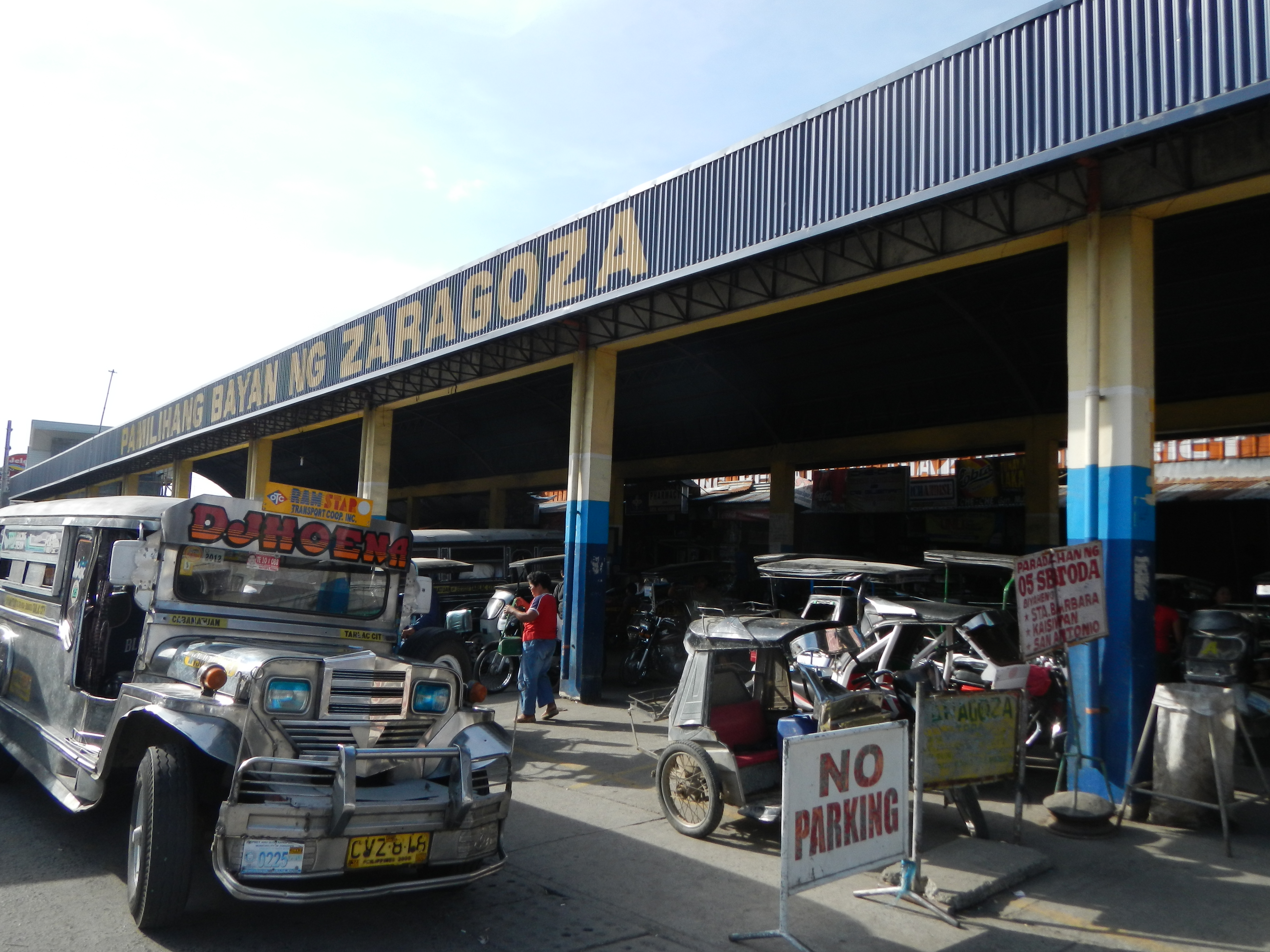
Public market
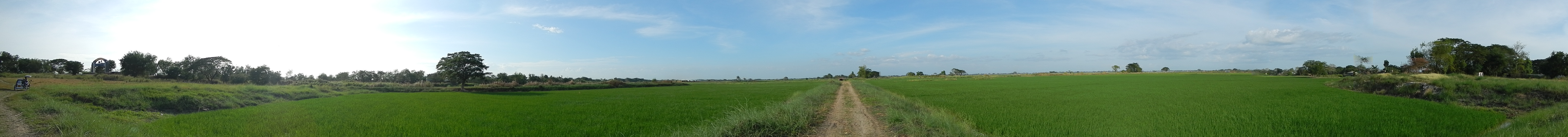
Panorama of rice fields
