= List of people from Cabanatuan =

The following is a list of notable people who were either born in, lived in, are current residents of, or are closely associated with the city of Cabanatuan, Nueva Ecija.

== National heroes and patriots ==
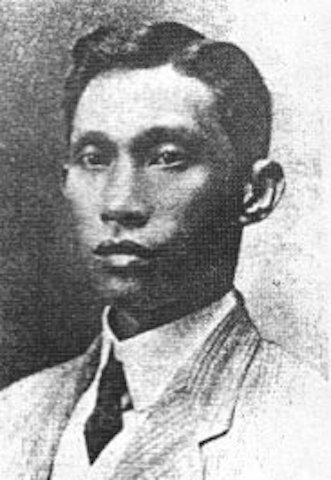
General Manuel Tinio

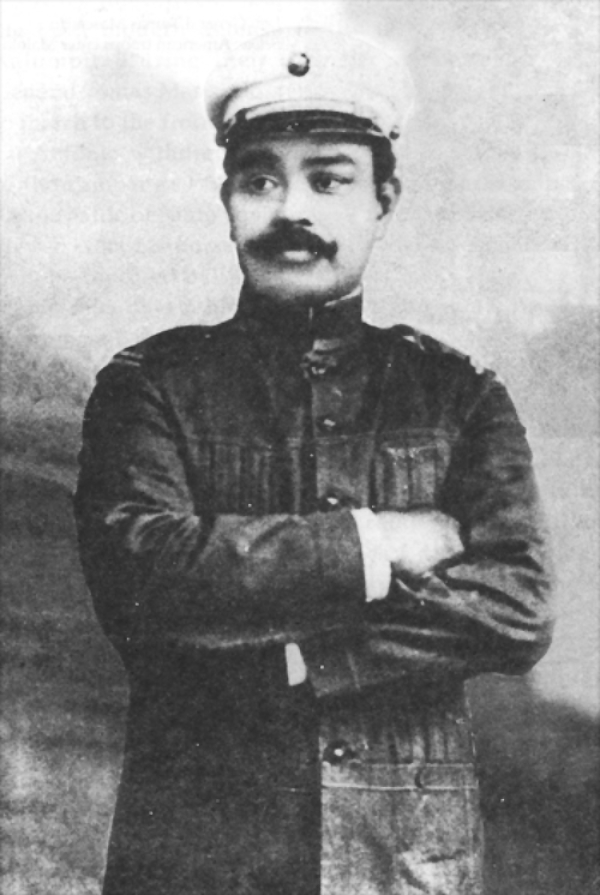
Heneral Luna

- Antonio Bautista – air force pilot and Medal of Valor awardee
- General Antonio Luna – Commanding General of the Philippine Republican Army; assassinated in Cabanatuan
- Juan Pajota – World War II guerrilla officer who played a key role in the Raid at Cabanatuan
- Manuel Tinio – youngest general of the Philippine Revolutionary Army and later governor of Nueva Ecija

== Entertainment ==
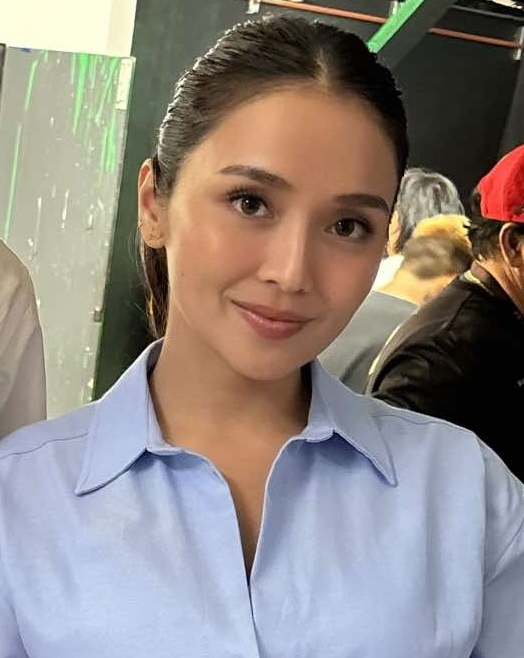
Kathryn Bernardo

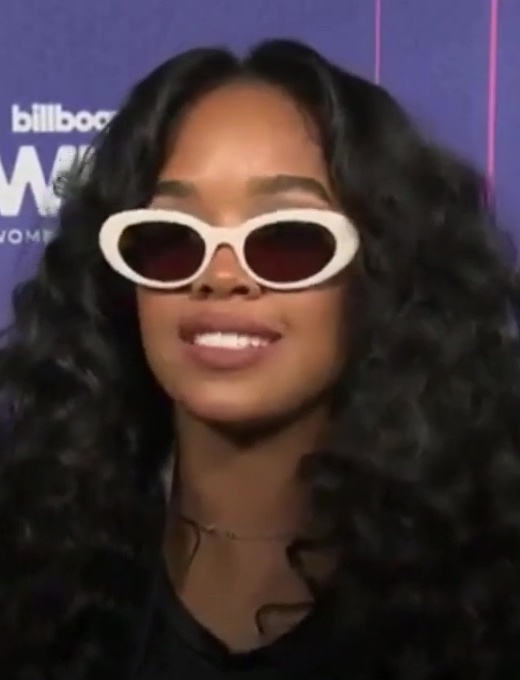
H.E.R. at Billboard Women in Music, 2022

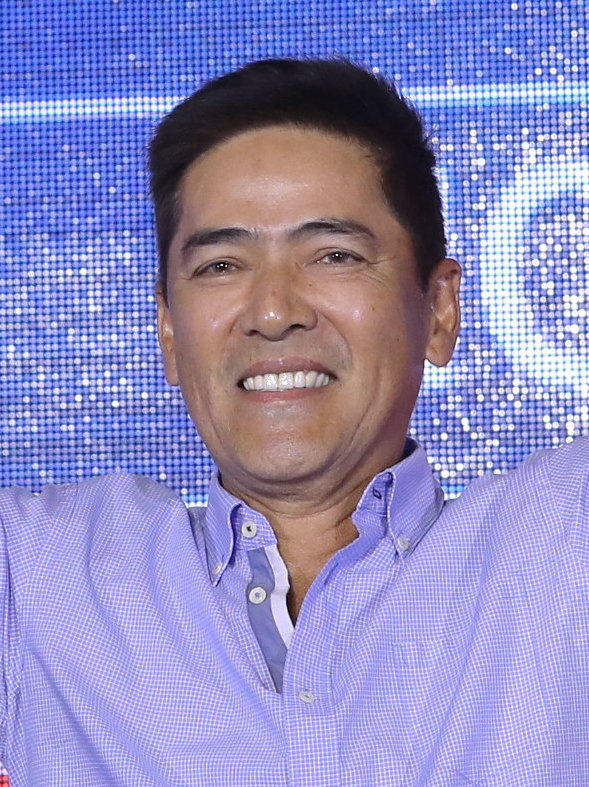
Vic Sotto

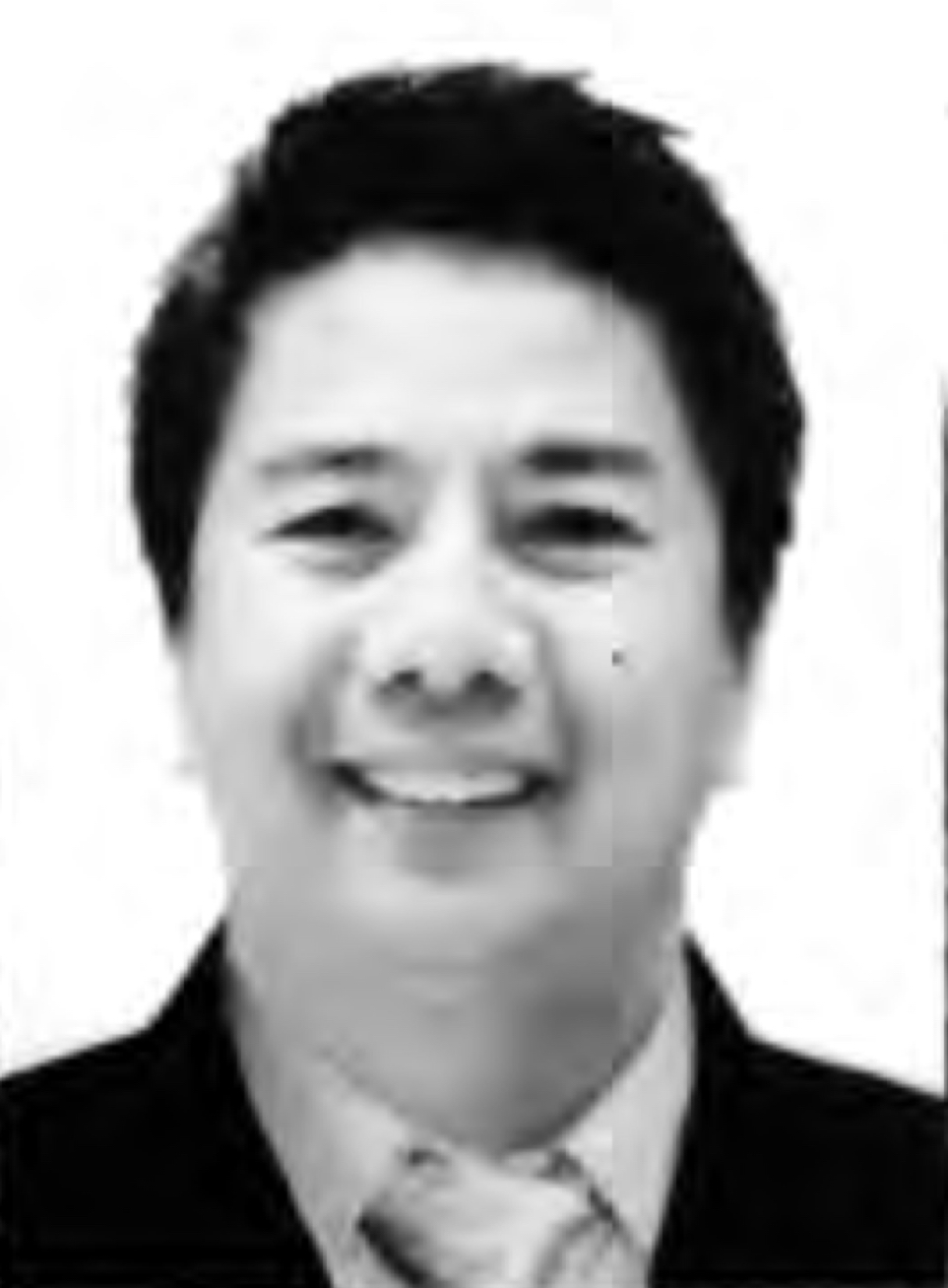
Willie Revillame

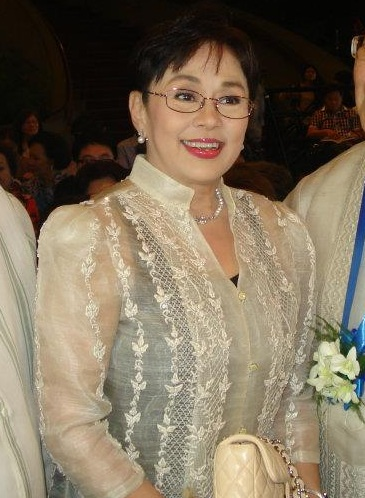
Vilma Santos-Recto

- Jason Abalos – actor and politician
- Paolo Ballesteros – actor, comedian and drag queen
- Heber Bartolome – folk singer
- Ruel S. Bayani – film and television director
- Kathryn Bernardo – actress and singer; highest-grossing Filipino actress of all time
- Gavin "Ser Geybin" Capinpin – vlogger
- Anthony Castelo – singer
- Val Castelo – singer and actor
- Manuel Chua – actor and model
- Nestor de Villa – actor
- H.E.R. – Academy, Emmy, and Grammy-winning singer-songwriter and actress
- Katrina Halili – actress
- Diana Mackey – actress and beauty queen
- Rose Marielle Mamaclay – singer; WCOPA Grand Champion
- Kaori Oinuma – actress; former PBB housemate
- Kurt Perez – former child actor; StarStruck Kids Ultimate Male Survivor
- Willie Revillame – actor, businessman and longtime host of major Philippine noontime variety shows
- Vilma Santos – actress and politician; FAMAS Hall of Fame inductee
- Yen Santos – actress; Gawad Urian Best Actress
- Romnick Sarmenta – actor; dubbed as the "Teenage King" in the 1980s
- Vic Sotto – actor, television host, and comedian; multi-awarded Box Office King
- Val Sotto – actor, singer and politician
- Xilhouete – drag performer

== Journalism ==
- Athena Imperial – GMA News reporter and Miss Earth - Water 2011

== Education, literature and the arts ==
- Lino Brocka – National Artist for Film
- Behn Cervantes – artist, activist and film director
- Emmanuel de Guzman – 12th president of the Polytechnic University of the Philippines.
- Doreen Fernandez – food writer and cultural historian
- Lázaro Francisco – novelist and National Artist for Literature.
- Damiana Eugenio – writer known as the "Mother of Philippine Folklore."
- Rony V. Diaz – writer and Palanca awardee

== Politics and government ==
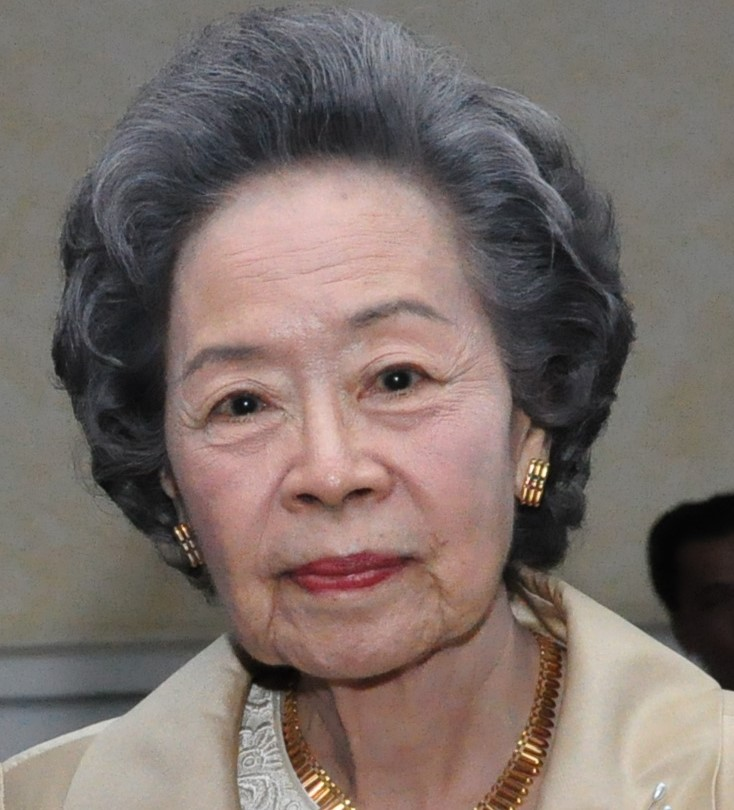
Former Associate Justice Ameurfina Melencio-Herrera

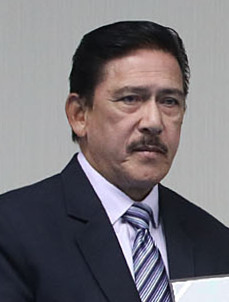
Former Senate President Tito Sotto

- Richard Albano – retired PNP General
- Jaime Bautista – businessman and former Secretary of Transportation
- Alice Bulos – Filipino American civil rights leader and Democratic Party delegate
- Oscar Castelo – former secretary of national defense and secretary of justice
- Delfin Castro – Armed Forces of the Philippines major general
- Perci Cendaña – representative, Akbayan Party-list
- Hermogenes Concepcion – former senator
- Hermogenes Concepcion Jr. – former solicitor general and associate justice of the Supreme Court of the Philippines
- Eliseo Cruz – retired Philippine National Police major general and Assistant Secretary of the Department of Justice
- Randy Escolango – undersecretary at the Department of Health
- Dr. Paulino J. García – former Secretary of Health
- Eduardo Joson – WWII guerrilla leader and former governor of Nueva Ecija
- Fortune Aleta-Ledesma – Honorary Consul General of Monaco to the Philippines
- Rafael V. Mariano – activist and former Secretary of Agrarian Reform
- Ameurfina Melencio-Herrera — lawyer and second woman to be appointed as Associate Justice of the Supreme Court of the Philippines
- Vicente "Tito" Sotto III – senate president, actor, and musician
- Jay Vergara – representative, Nueva Ecija's 3rd district
- Rosanna Vergara – representative, Nueva Ecija's 3rd district
- Aurelio Umali – governor of Nueva Ecija and representative, Nueva Ecija's 3rd district
- Czarina Umali – governor of Nueva Ecija and representative, Nueva Ecija's 3rd district

== Religion ==
- Emma de Guzman – Marian visionary and co-founder of La Pietà International Prayer Group
- Frederick Kriekenbeek – Catholic priest and pioneering exorcist in the Archdiocese of Cebu

== Sports ==
- Hernando Castelo – sports shooter; Asian Games Gold medalist
- Samboy de Leon – basketball player
- Japoy Lizardo – taekwondo athlete, actor, and commercial model
- Frances Molina – volleyball player
- Ferdinand Pascual – international basketball referee

== Other ==
- Alice Eduardo – businesswoman; founder and CEO of Sta. Elena Construction and Development Corporation
- Mary Jane Veloso – Filipino migrant worker who was sentenced to death in Indonesia for drug trafficking in 2010. Her case drew international attention and widespread advocacy efforts, leading to a stay of execution in 2015.
