= 2010 Central Luzon local elections =

Local elections were held in Central Luzon on May 10, 2010, as part of the 2010 Philippine general election.

== Angeles City ==
=== Mayor ===
Incumbent mayor Francis Nepomuceno of the Nationalist People's Coalition ran for re-election to a second term, but was defeated by former mayor Edgardo Pamintuan Sr. of Lakas–Kampi–CMD.

Candidate	Party	Votes	%
Edgardo Pamintuan Sr.	Lakas–Kampi–CMD	60,562	55.80
Francis Nepomuceno	Nationalist People's Coalition	34,105	31.42
Rodelio Mamac Sr.	Liberal Party	13,875	12.78
Total		108,542	100.00
Valid votes		108,542	96.81
Invalid/blank votes		3,578	3.19
Total votes		112,120	100.00
Lakas–Kampi–CMD gain from Nationalist People's Coalition			
Source: Commission on Elections

=== Vice Mayor ===
Incumbent Vice Mayor Vicky Vega of Lakas–Kampi–CMD won re-election to a second term.

Candidate	Party	Votes	%
Vicky Vega	Lakas–Kampi–CMD	61,289	59.52
Ricardo Zalamea	Nationalist People's Coalition	31,018	30.12
Crispin Cadiang	Liberal Party	10,659	10.35
Total		102,966	100.00
Valid votes		102,966	91.84
Invalid/blank votes		9,154	8.16
Total votes		112,120	100.00
Lakas–Kampi–CMD hold			
Source: Commission on Elections

=== City Council ===
The Angeles City Council is composed of 12 councilors, 10 of whom are elected.

Party	Votes	%	Seats
Lakas–Kampi–CMD	374,146	44.22	5
Nationalist People's Coalition	337,227	39.86	5
Liberal Party	101,699	12.02	0
Nacionalista Party	4,800	0.57	0
Independent	28,219	3.34	0
Total	846,091	100.00	10
Total votes	112,120	–	
Source: Commission on Elections

Candidate	Party	Votes	%
Jericho Aguas	Nationalist People's Coalition	55,298	6.54
Maricel Morales	Lakas–Kampi–CMD	47,886	5.66
Arvin Suller	Nationalist People's Coalition	46,243	5.47
Alexander Indiongco	Lakas–Kampi–CMD	45,824	5.42
Bryan Matthew Nepomuceno	Nationalist People's Coalition	45,094	5.33
Willie Rivera	Lakas–Kampi–CMD	42,527	5.03
Jesus Sangil	Lakas–Kampi–CMD	41,801	4.94
Joseph Alfie Bonifacio	Nationalist People's Coalition	41,770	4.94
Danilo Lacson	Nationalist People's Coalition	40,403	4.78
Edu Pamintuan	Lakas–Kampi–CMD	40,117	4.74
Angelo Justin Lopez III	Lakas–Kampi–CMD	38,563	4.56
Efren dela Cruz	Lakas–Kampi–CMD	33,171	3.92
Ruben Maniago	Lakas–Kampi–CMD	32,784	3.87
Rafael del Rosario Jr.	Nationalist People's Coalition	31,706	3.75
Rodolfo Simeon	Nationalist People's Coalition	27,265	3.22
Jeremias Alejandrino	Lakas–Kampi–CMD	26,324	3.11
Reynaldo Gueco	Lakas–Kampi–CMD	25,149	2.97
Rodel Abrea	Liberal Party	21,234	2.51
Valentino Lagman	Liberal Party	20,387	2.41
Rico Dizon	Nationalist People's Coalition	18,376	2.17
Abelardo Pamintuan Jr.	Nationalist People's Coalition	17,539	2.07
Arnel Panganiban	Independent	15,849	1.87
Ma. Luisa Bañola	Liberal Party	15,454	1.83
Bernardino de Guzman	Nationalist People's Coalition	13,533	1.60
Paulo Bucud	Liberal Party	11,479	1.36
Lilia Pineda	Liberal Party	10,823	1.28
Robert Yeen	Liberal Party	10,790	1.28
Mario Cruz	Liberal Party	5,801	0.69
Andres Tan	Liberal Party	5,731	0.68
Romeo Tolentino	Independent	5,278	0.62
Lener Biag	Nacionalista Party	4,800	0.57
Alex Nunag	Independent	4,683	0.55
Dave Tecson	Independent	2,409	0.28
Total		846,091	100.00
Total votes		112,120	–
Source: Commission on Elections

== Aurora ==
=== Governor ===
Incumbent governor Bella Angara of Laban ng Demokratikong Pilipino won re-election to a third term.

Candidate	Party	Votes	%
Bella Angara	Laban ng Demokratikong Pilipino	46,678	57.11
Mariano Tangson	Nacionalista Party	31,652	38.73
Ruben dela Cruz	PDP–Laban	3,398	4.16
Total		81,728	100.00
Valid votes		81,728	95.31
Invalid/blank votes		4,018	4.69
Total votes		85,746	100.00
Laban ng Demokratikong Pilipino hold			
Source: Commission on Elections

=== Vice Governor ===
Incumbent Vice Governor Gerardo Noveras of the Liberal Party won re-election to a second term.

Candidate	Party	Votes	%
Gerardo Noveras	Liberal Party	44,606	57.64
Danilo Tolentino	Laban ng Demokratikong Pilipino	32,780	42.36
Total		77,386	100.00
Valid votes		77,386	90.25
Invalid/blank votes		8,360	9.75
Total votes		85,746	100.00
Liberal Party hold			
Source: Commission on Elections

=== Provincial Board ===
The Aurora Provincial Board is composed of 12 board members, 8 of whom are elected.

Party	Votes	%	Seats
Laban ng Demokratikong Pilipino	150,292	64.59	7
Nacionalista Party	72,218	31.04	1
Liberal Party	5,486	2.36	0
PDP–Laban	2,105	0.90	0
Independent	2,587	1.11	0
Total	232,688	100.00	8
Total votes	85,746	–	
Source: Commission on Elections

==== 1st district ====
Candidate	Party	Votes	%
Pedro Ong Jr.	Nacionalista Party	31,801	22.55
Philip Butch Bautista	Laban ng Demokratikong Pilipino	25,978	18.42
Oscar Padua	Laban ng Demokratikong Pilipino	25,813	18.30
Cesar Pimentel	Laban ng Demokratikong Pilipino	21,894	15.52
Oliver Ian Abordo	Laban ng Demokratikong Pilipino	16,966	12.03
Marietta Porquieriño	Nacionalista Party	13,904	9.86
Jose Gagarin	Independent	2,587	1.83
Aizalea Dinamling	PDP–Laban	2,105	1.49
Total		141,048	100.00
Total votes		51,838	–
Source: Commission on Elections

==== 2nd district ====
Candidate	Party	Votes	%
Joselito Cabauatan Sr.	Laban ng Demokratikong Pilipino	16,027	17.49
Denia Valin	Laban ng Demokratikong Pilipino	15,372	16.77
Renato Pascua	Laban ng Demokratikong Pilipino	14,197	15.49
Ruben Alipio Jr.	Laban ng Demokratikong Pilipino	14,045	15.33
Pablo Miran	Nacionalista Party	13,063	14.25
Honorio Marzan Jr.	Nacionalista Party	9,317	10.17
Tito Tubera	Liberal Party	5,486	5.99
Dante Villar	Nacionalista Party	4,133	4.51
Total		91,640	100.00
Total votes		33,908	–
Source: Commission on Elections

== Bataan ==
=== Governor ===
Incumbent governor Tet Garcia of Lakas–Kampi–CMD won re-election to a third term.

Candidate	Party	Votes	%
Tet Garcia	Lakas–Kampi–CMD	212,808	61.40
Nelson David	Nationalist People's Coalition	133,780	38.60
Total		346,588	100.00
Valid votes		346,588	94.99
Invalid/blank votes		18,263	5.01
Total votes		364,851	100.00
Lakas–Kampi–CMD hold			
Source: Commission on Elections

=== Vice Governor ===
Incumbent Vice Governor Serafin Roman of the Liberal Party ran for the Bataan Provincial Board in the 1st district. Provincial board member Efren Dominic Pascual Jr. of the Nacionalista Party won the election.

Candidate	Party	Votes	%
Efren Dominic Pascual Jr.	Nacionalista Party	199,819	62.07
Rolando Tigas	Lakas–Kampi–CMD	122,117	37.93
Total		321,936	100.00
Valid votes		321,936	88.24
Invalid/blank votes		42,915	11.76
Total votes		364,851	100.00
Nacionalista Party gain from Liberal Party			
Source: Commission on Elections

=== Provincial Board ===
The Bataan Provincial Board is composed of 14 board members, 10 of whom are elected.

Party	Votes	%	Seats
Lakas–Kampi–CMD	720,708	54.12	7
Liberal Party	268,521	20.16	2
Nationalist People's Coalition	204,783	15.38	0
Nacionalista Party	137,643	10.34	1
Total	1,331,655	100.00	10
Total votes	364,851	–	
Source: Commission on Elections

==== 1st district ====
Candidate	Party	Votes	%
Dexter Dominguez	Nacionalista Party	85,969	14.33
Gaudencio Ferrer	Liberal Party	69,009	11.50
Jose Alejandre Payumo III	Liberal Party	64,971	10.83
Aristotle Gaza	Lakas–Kampi–CMD	58,761	9.79
Efren Cruz	Lakas–Kampi–CMD	53,891	8.98
Orlando Miranda	Lakas–Kampi–CMD	52,420	8.74
Reynaldo Ibe	Nacionalista Party	51,674	8.61
Rodolfo Izon	Lakas–Kampi–CMD	44,408	7.40
Reynaldo Muli	Liberal Party	42,191	7.03
Edward Roman	Lakas–Kampi–CMD	39,239	6.54
Serafin Roman	Liberal Party	37,387	6.23
Total		599,920	100.00
Total votes		163,094	–
Source: Commission on Elections

==== 2nd district ====
Candidate	Party	Votes	%
Manuel Beltran	Lakas–Kampi–CMD	107,767	14.73
Jovy Banzon	Lakas–Kampi–CMD	98,111	13.41
Eduard Florendo	Lakas–Kampi–CMD	94,640	12.93
Dante Manalaysay	Lakas–Kampi–CMD	93,477	12.77
Gerardo Roxas	Lakas–Kampi–CMD	77,994	10.66
Gregorio Uy Jr.	Nationalist People's Coalition	65,588	8.96
Cecilia Banzon	Liberal Party	54,963	7.51
Jose Villapando Sr.	Nationalist People's Coalition	53,600	7.33
Remo Camacho	Nationalist People's Coalition	44,337	6.06
Christian Liloc	Nationalist People's Coalition	41,258	5.64
Total		731,735	100.00
Total votes		201,757	–
Source: Commission on Elections

== Bulacan ==
=== Governor ===
Incumbent governor Jonjon Mendoza of the Liberal Party ran for the House of Representatives in Bulacan's 3rd district. The Liberal Party nominated former governor Maria Josefina dela Cruz, who was defeated by vice governor Wilhelmino Sy-Alvarado of Lakas–Kampi–CMD.

Candidate	Party	Votes	%
Wilhelmino Sy-Alvarado	Lakas–Kampi–CMD	533,527	51.21
Maria Josefina dela Cruz	Liberal Party	492,468	47.27
Miguel Esguerra	Philippine Green Republican Party	11,212	1.08
Santos Caperlac	Independent	4,711	0.45
Total		1,041,918	100.00
Valid votes		1,041,918	89.90
Invalid/blank votes		117,064	10.10
Total votes		1,158,982	100.00
Lakas–Kampi–CMD gain from Liberal Party			
Source: Commission on Elections

=== Vice Governor ===
Incumbent Vice Governor Wilhelmino Sy-Alvarado of Lakas–Kampi–CMD ran for Governor of Bulacan. Lakas–Kampi–CMD nominated former provincial board member Daniel Fernando, who won the election.

Candidate	Party	Votes	%
Daniel Fernando	Lakas–Kampi–CMD	538,336	55.42
Pacifico Aniag	Liberal Party	326,099	33.57
Serafin dela Cruz	Independent	91,935	9.47
Mayeth Cruz	Independent	14,933	1.54
Total		971,303	100.00
Valid votes		971,303	83.81
Invalid/blank votes		187,679	16.19
Total votes		1,158,982	100.00
Lakas–Kampi–CMD hold			
Source: Commission on Elections

=== Provincial Board ===
The Bulacan Provincial Board is composed of 13 board members, 10 of whom are elected.

Party	Votes	%	Seats
Liberal Party	1,143,377	57.38	8
Lakas–Kampi–CMD	611,413	30.68	2
PDP–Laban	37,450	1.88	0
Pwersa ng Masang Pilipino	35,825	1.80	0
Nacionalista Party	34,752	1.74	0
Independent	129,848	6.52	0
Total	1,992,665	100.00	10
Total votes	1,158,982	–	
Source: Commission on Elections

==== 1st district ====
Candidate	Party	Votes	%
Michael Fermin	Liberal Party	111,813	20.17
Felix Ople	Liberal Party	109,927	19.83
Therese Cheryll Ople	Lakas–Kampi–CMD	91,112	16.43
Victorino Aldaba Jr.	Liberal Party	83,427	15.05
Vicente Cruz	Lakas–Kampi–CMD	75,248	13.57
Emmanuel Sacay	Independent	70,894	12.79
Ryan Espiritu	Lakas–Kampi–CMD	7,612	1.37
Alberto Carasig	Independent	4,408	0.80
Total		554,441	100.00
Total votes		272,601	–
Source: Commission on Elections

==== 2nd district ====
Candidate	Party	Votes	%
Ramon Posadas	Liberal Party	120,728	30.96
Enrique dela Cruz Jr.	Liberal Party	110,271	28.28
Norielito German	Lakas–Kampi–CMD	69,538	17.83
Cecilia Quimpo	Lakas–Kampi–CMD	38,048	9.76
Jose Francisco Rivera	Pwersa ng Masang Pilipino	22,971	5.89
Lydia Abad	Independent	15,522	3.98
Francisco Concepcion	Pwersa ng Masang Pilipino	12,854	3.30
Total		389,932	100.00
Total votes		279,854	–
Source: Commission on Elections

==== 3rd district ====
Candidate	Party	Votes	%
Rino Castro	Liberal Party	98,122	29.65
Enrique Viudez II	Liberal Party	77,782	23.50
Richard dela Cruz	Lakas–Kampi–CMD	67,630	20.43
Victoriano Cruz	Lakas–Kampi–CMD	50,141	15.15
Carmencita Martinez	Nacionalista Party	34,752	10.50
Leo Babasa	Independent	2,536	0.77
Total		330,963	100.00
Total votes		232,038	–
Source: Commission on Elections

==== 4th district ====
Candidate	Party	Votes	%
Eulogio Sarmiento III	Liberal Party	164,597	22.95
Enrique delos Santos Jr.	Liberal Party	163,763	22.83
Romeo Allan Robes	Lakas–Kampi–CMD	104,668	14.59
Danilo Certeza	Liberal Party	102,947	14.35
Zosimo Lorenzo	Lakas–Kampi–CMD	55,077	7.68
Ireneo Tan	Lakas–Kampi–CMD	52,339	7.30
Romeo Almario	PDP–Laban	37,450	5.22
Ronald Garcia	Independent	22,759	3.17
Rodello Tactac	Independent	13,729	1.91
Total		717,329	100.00
Total votes		374,489	–
Source: Commission on Elections

== Nueva Ecija ==
=== Governor ===
Incumbent governor Aurelio Umali of Lakas–Kampi–CMD won re-election to a second term.

Candidate	Party	Votes	%
Aurelio Umali	Lakas–Kampi–CMD	517,852	61.72
Edward Thomas Joson	Bagong Lakas ng Nueva Ecija	315,641	37.62
Felino Pajarillo Jr.	Philippine Green Republican Party	5,532	0.66
Total		839,025	100.00
Valid votes		839,025	92.53
Invalid/blank votes		67,766	7.47
Total votes		906,791	100.00
Lakas–Kampi–CMD hold			
Source: Commission on Elections

=== Vice Governor ===
Incumbent Vice Governor Edward Thomas Joson of Bagong Lakas ng Nueva Ecija (Balane) ran for Governor of Nueva Ecija. Balane nominated provincial board member Rommel Padilla, who was defeated by Gay Padiernos of Lakas–Kampi–CMD.

Candidate	Party	Votes	%
Gay Padiernos	Lakas–Kampi–CMD	458,454	56.81
Rommel Padilla	Bagong Lakas ng Nueva Ecija	341,199	42.28
Ricardo Santiago	Philippine Green Republican Party	7,312	0.91
Total		806,965	100.00
Valid votes		806,965	88.99
Invalid/blank votes		99,826	11.01
Total votes		906,791	100.00
Lakas–Kampi–CMD gain from Bagong Lakas ng Nueva Ecija			
Source: Commission on Elections

=== Provincial Board ===
The Nueva Ecija Provincial Board is composed of 13 board members, 10 of whom are elected.

Party	Votes	%	Seats
Unang Sigaw	861,323	53.46	8
Bagong Lakas ng Nueva Ecija	680,758	42.25	2
Nacionalista Party	19,478	1.21	0
Philippine Green Republican Party	17,510	1.09	0
Liberal Party	15,044	0.93	0
Independent	17,126	1.06	0
Total	1,611,239	100.00	10
Total votes	906,791	–	
Source: Commission on Elections

==== 1st district ====
Candidate	Party	Votes	%
Estrellita Suansing	Unang Sigaw	115,797	23.87
Eduardo Rey Joson	Bagong Lakas ng Nueva Ecija	98,736	20.35
Belinda Palilio	Unang Sigaw	85,061	17.53
Eric Daniel Salazar	Bagong Lakas ng Nueva Ecija	84,281	17.37
Raymund Sarmiento	Unang Sigaw	46,338	9.55
Jose Bernardo Yango	Bagong Lakas ng Nueva Ecija	44,697	9.21
Amelia Asuncion	Philippine Green Republican Party	4,574	0.94
Feddy Labrador Sr.	Philippine Green Republican Party	3,525	0.73
Dominic Frances	Philippine Green Republican Party	2,088	0.43
Total		485,097	100.00
Total votes		228,005	–
Source: Commission on Elections

==== 2nd district ====
Candidate	Party	Votes	%
Joseph Ortiz	Unang Sigaw	95,337	31.97
Edgardo Agliam	Unang Sigaw	74,852	25.10
Wilfredo Munsayac	Bagong Lakas ng Nueva Ecija	71,221	23.88
Bella Aurora Dulay	Bagong Lakas ng Nueva Ecija	41,513	13.92
Baby Annie Joanino	Independent	10,161	3.41
Renante Valdez	Philippine Green Republican Party	5,105	1.71
Total		298,189	100.00
Total votes		202,693	–
Source: Commission on Elections

==== 3rd district ====
Candidate	Party	Votes	%
Emmanuel Umali	Unang Sigaw	112,382	31.53
Johnero Mercado	Unang Sigaw	91,711	25.73
Raqueliza Agapito	Bagong Lakas ng Nueva Ecija	79,415	22.28
Melchor Morales	Bagong Lakas ng Nueva Ecija	63,730	17.88
Jay Orlando Valino	Independent	6,965	1.95
Norma Sadie	Philippine Green Republican Party	1,287	0.36
Fe Llanillo	Philippine Green Republican Party	931	0.26
Total		356,421	100.00
Total votes		233,213	–
Source: Commission on Elections

==== 4th district ====
Candidate	Party	Votes	%
Napoleon Interior	Unang Sigaw	94,528	20.05
Romanito Juatco	Bagong Lakas ng Nueva Ecija	83,620	17.73
Teresita Patiag	Unang Sigaw	76,904	16.31
Zaldy Matias	Unang Sigaw	68,413	14.51
Ceferino Hernandez	Bagong Lakas ng Nueva Ecija	63,693	13.51
Napoleon Ocampo	Bagong Lakas ng Nueva Ecija	49,852	10.57
Jacinto Binuya	Nacionalista Party	19,478	4.13
Sixto del Rosario	Liberal Party	15,044	3.19
Total		471,532	100.00
Total votes		242,880	–
Source: Commission on Elections

== Olongapo ==
=== Mayor ===
Incumbent Mayor James Gordon Jr. of Bagumbayan–VNP won re-election to a third term.

Candidate	Party	Votes	%
James Gordon Jr.	Bagumbayan–VNP	53,349	66.60
Vicente Magsaysay	Lakas–Kampi–CMD	22,601	28.22
Jerome Bacay	Independent	4,150	5.18
Total		80,100	100.00
Bagumbayan–VNP hold			
Source: Punto

=== Vice Mayor ===
Incumbent Vice Mayor Cynthia Cajudo of Bagumbayan–VNP ran for re-election to a second term, but was defeated by Rolen Paulino of the Nationalist People's Coalition.

Candidate	Party	Votes	%
Rolen Paulino	Nationalist People's Coalition	47,074	60.20
Cynthia Cajudo	Bagumbayan–VNP	31,121	39.80
Total		78,195	100.00
Nationalist People's Coalition gain from Bagumbayan–VNP			
Source: Punto

=== City Council ===
The Olongapo City Council is composed of 12 councilors, 10 of whom are elected.

The following were elected as councilors.

- Rodel Cerezo (Bagumbayan–VNP)
- Eyrma Marzan-Estrella (Bagumbayan–VNP)
- Aquilino Cortez Jr. (Bagumbayan–VNP)
- James de los Reyes (Bagumbayan–VNP)
- Gina Perez (Bagumbayan–VNP)
- Elena Dabu (Bagumbayan–VNP)
- Eduardo Piano (Bagumbayan–VNP)
- Edna Elane (Bagumbayan–VNP)
- Noel Atienza (Nacionalista Party)
- Sarah Lugerna Lipumano (Liberal Party)

The following were the other candidates who ran in the city council election.

- Emerito Linus Bacay (Liberal Party)
- Angelito Baloy (Liberal Party)
- Jesus Danugrao (Nationalist People's Coalition)
- Jonathan de Castro (Ang Kapatiran)
- Ronald Fonseca (Liberal Party)
- Romeo Guerrero (Bagumbayan–VNP)
- Roderick Alexis Lindayag (Liberal Party)
- Jonathan Manalo (Bagumbayan–VNP)
- Samuel Matias (Ang Kapatiran)
- Roland Pangantihan (Ang Kapatiran)
- Arnel Pangcatan (Independent)
- Gina Prohhorov (Lakas–Kampi–CMD)
- Rosalind Reyes (Nationalist People's Coalition)
- Glen Mar Roque (Ang Kapatiran)
- John Lee Santiago (Independent)
- Carlin Woodruff Jr. (Nacionalista Party)

== Pampanga ==
=== Governor ===
Incumbent governor Eddie Panlilio of the Liberal Party ran for re-election to a second term, but was defeated by former provincial board member Lilia Pineda of Lakas–Kampi–CMD.

Candidate	Party	Votes	%
Lilia Pineda	Lakas–Kampi–CMD	488,521	65.98
Eddie Panlilio	Liberal Party	242,367	32.74
Ricardo Ocampo Sr.	Independent	9,479	1.28
Total		740,367	100.00
Valid votes		740,367	92.24
Invalid/blank votes		62,300	7.76
Total votes		802,667	100.00
Lakas–Kampi–CMD gain from Liberal Party			
Source: Commission on Elections

=== Vice Governor ===
Incumbent Vice Governor Yeng Guiao of Lakas–Kampi–CMD won re-election to a third term.

Candidate	Party	Votes	%
Yeng Guiao	Lakas–Kampi–CMD	393,477	59.93
Marcos Jose Lazatin	Liberal Party	263,064	40.07
Total		656,541	100.00
Valid votes		656,541	81.79
Invalid/blank votes		146,126	18.21
Total votes		802,667	100.00
Lakas–Kampi–CMD hold			
Source: Commission on Elections

=== Provincial Board ===
The Pampanga Provincial Board is composed of 13 board members, 10 of whom are elected.

Party	Votes	%	Seats
Lakas–Kampi–CMD	850,724	61.42	7
Liberal Party	189,281	13.66	0
Nacionalista Party	178,087	12.86	2
Bangon Pilipinas	35,986	2.60	0
Independent	131,075	9.46	1
Total	1,385,153	100.00	10
Total votes	802,667	–	
Source: Commission on Elections

==== 1st district ====
Candidate	Party	Votes	%
Crisostomo Garbo	Lakas–Kampi–CMD	60,099	41.39
Tarcicio Halili	Independent	52,367	36.07
Alexander Pineda	Lakas–Kampi–CMD	19,373	13.34
Fernando Chan	Liberal Party	13,348	9.19
Total		145,187	100.00
Total votes		110,214	–
Source: Commission on Elections

==== 2nd district ====
Candidate	Party	Votes	%
Edna David	Lakas–Kampi–CMD	139,934	34.25
Teresito Lingad	Lakas–Kampi–CMD	74,277	18.18
Salvador Dimson Jr.	Lakas–Kampi–CMD	63,209	15.47
Michael Mangiliman	Independent	59,730	14.62
Janne Ayen	Liberal Party	29,161	7.14
Emy Bucud	Liberal Party	27,054	6.62
Juanito Pring	Liberal Party	15,195	3.72
Total		408,560	100.00
Total votes		219,592	–
Source: Commission on Elections

==== 3rd district ====
Candidate	Party	Votes	%
Monina Laus	Lakas–Kampi–CMD	95,722	18.31
Trina Dizon	Nacionalista Party	93,446	17.87
Raul Macalino	Lakas–Kampi–CMD	90,223	17.25
Nelson Lingat	Liberal Party	59,860	11.45
Karl Domingo	Lakas–Kampi–CMD	48,895	9.35
Johnny Quiambao	Lakas–Kampi–CMD	42,895	8.20
Alain Paul Espino	Lakas–Kampi–CMD	36,235	6.93
Jose Marie Sandiko	Liberal Party	22,888	4.38
Virgilio Cortez	Liberal Party	21,775	4.16
Arthur Tuazon	Bangon Pilipinas	10,959	2.10
Total		522,898	100.00
Total votes		238,862	–
Source: Commission on Elections

==== 4th district ====
Candidate	Party	Votes	%
Ricardo Yabut	Lakas–Kampi–CMD	123,467	40.02
Nestor Tolentino	Nacionalista Party	84,641	27.44
Nelson Calara	Lakas–Kampi–CMD	56,395	18.28
Danilo Amurao	Bangon Pilipinas	25,027	8.11
Edgardo Puno	Independent	18,978	6.15
Total		308,508	100.00
Total votes		233,999	–
Source: Commission on Elections

== Tarlac ==
=== Governor ===
Incumbent Governor Victor Yap of the Nationalist People's Coalition won re-election to a second term.

Candidate	Party	Votes	%
Victor Yap	Nationalist People's Coalition	396,069	81.02
Marcelino Aganon Jr.	Lakas–Kampi–CMD	81,695	16.71
Mario Bagtas	Independent	5,689	1.16
Ernesto Calma	Independent	2,993	0.61
Salvador Santos	Philippine Green Republican Party	2,429	0.50
Total		488,875	100.00
Valid votes		488,875	90.19
Invalid/blank votes		53,195	9.81
Total votes		542,070	100.00
Nationalist People's Coalition hold			
Source: Commission on Elections

=== Vice Governor ===
Term-limited incumbent Vice Governor Marcelino Aganon Jr. of Lakas–Kampi–CMD ran for Governor of Tarlac. Lakas–Kampi–CMD nominated provincial board member Pearl Angeli Pacada, who won the election.

Candidate	Party	Votes	%
Pearl Angeli Pacada	Lakas–Kampi–CMD	204,460	43.94
Wilfredo Sawit	Nationalist People's Coalition	155,271	33.37
Franklin Dayao	Liberal Party	105,615	22.70
Total		465,346	100.00
Valid votes		465,346	85.85
Invalid/blank votes		76,724	14.15
Total votes		542,070	100.00
Lakas–Kampi–CMD hold			
Source: Commission on Elections

=== Provincial Board ===
The Tarlac Provincial Board is composed of 13 board members, 10 of whom are elected.

Party	Votes	%	Seats
Nationalist People's Coalition	504,327	41.15	4
Lakas–Kampi–CMD	397,016	32.39	3
Liberal Party	238,933	19.49	2
Nacionalista Party	54,695	4.46	1
PDP–Laban	30,736	2.51	0
Total	1,225,707	100.00	10
Total votes	542,070	–	
Source: Commission on Elections

==== 1st district ====
Candidate	Party	Votes	%
Tito Razalan	Nationalist People's Coalition	80,900	21.35
Rommel David	Lakas–Kampi–CMD	78,342	20.68
Noel dela Cruz	Nationalist People's Coalition	56,962	15.03
Rey Christopher Fajardo	Lakas–Kampi–CMD	55,185	14.56
Rodolfo Guerrero	Lakas–Kampi–CMD	40,858	10.78
Mario Maddela	Nationalist People's Coalition	35,917	9.48
Deoval Lopez	PDP–Laban	30,736	8.11
Total		378,900	100.00
Total votes		184,132	–
Source: Commission on Elections

==== 2nd district ====
Candidate	Party	Votes	%
Harmes Sembrano	Nationalist People's Coalition	100,256	19.12
Antonio Cervantes Jr.	Liberal Party	89,934	17.15
Enrico de Leon	Liberal Party	85,777	16.36
Danilo Asiaten	Lakas–Kampi–CMD	59,550	11.36
Tyrone Aganon	Lakas–Kampi–CMD	49,189	9.38
Godofredo Sabado Jr.	Nationalist People's Coalition	48,078	9.17
Bienvenido Buan Jr.	Nationalist People's Coalition	47,263	9.01
Arlan Fajardo	Lakas–Kampi–CMD	31,538	6.01
Jesus Concepcion	Nationalist People's Coalition	12,827	2.45
Total		524,412	100.00
Total votes		203,851	–
Source: Commission on Elections

==== 3rd district ====
Candidate	Party	Votes	%
Danilo David	Nationalist People's Coalition	57,754	17.91
Henry Cruz	Nacionalista Party	54,695	16.97
George Feliciano	Lakas–Kampi–CMD	37,302	11.57
Rolando Pineda	Nationalist People's Coalition	32,345	10.03
Rainier Rivera	Nationalist People's Coalition	32,025	9.93
Arnaldo Dizon	Lakas–Kampi–CMD	27,350	8.48
Arnel Dizon	Liberal Party	21,928	6.80
Enrique Quizon	Liberal Party	20,866	6.47
Raul Narciso	Liberal Party	20,428	6.34
Carlito Policarpio	Lakas–Kampi–CMD	17,702	5.49
Total		322,395	100.00
Total votes		154,087	–
Source: Commission on Elections

== Zambales ==
=== Governor ===
Incumbent Governor Amor Deloso of the Liberal Party ran for re-election to a second term, but was defeated by former Secretary of Public Works and Highways Jun Ebdane of Lapiang Manggagawa.

Candidate	Party	Votes	%
Jun Ebdane	Lapiang Manggagawa	125,202	55.62
Amor Deloso	Liberal Party	96,112	42.69
Hilary Pangan	Ang Kapatiran	3,088	1.37
Myrna Español	Independent	715	0.32
Total		225,117	100.00
Valid votes		225,117	94.68
Invalid/blank votes		12,648	5.32
Total votes		237,765	100.00
Lapiang Manggagawa gain from Liberal Party			
Source: Commission on Elections

=== Vice Governor ===
Incumbent Vice Governor Anne Marie Gordon of Bagumbayan–VNP ran for the House of Representatives in Zambales' 1st district. Former vice governor Ramon Lacbain II won the election as an independent.

Candidate	Party	Votes	%
Ramon Lacbain II	Independent	69,448	33.90
Renato Collado	Lakas–Kampi–CMD	42,677	20.83
Jury Deloso	Lapiang Manggagawa	37,717	18.41
Saturnino Bactad	Liberal Party	28,992	14.15
Samuel Ablola	Independent	25,215	12.31
Willie Viloria	Independent	836	0.41
Total		204,885	100.00
Valid votes		204,885	86.17
Invalid/blank votes		32,880	13.83
Total votes		237,765	100.00
Independent gain from Bagumbayan–VNP			
Source: Commission on Elections

=== Provincial Board ===
The Zambales Provincial Board is composed of 13 board members, 10 of whom are elected.

Party	Votes	%	Seats
Liberal Party	387,279	48.42	5
Lakas–Kampi–CMD	143,350	17.92	1
Lapiang Manggagawa	59,944	7.49	1
Nacionalista Party	23,163	2.90	0
Ang Kapatiran	6,678	0.83	0
Independent	179,436	22.43	3
Total	799,850	100.00	10
Total votes	237,765	–	
Source: Commission on Elections

==== 1st district ====
Candidate	Party	Votes	%
Jonathan John Khonghun	Liberal Party	44,916	30.89
Jose Benedicto Felarca	Liberal Party	34,518	23.74
Jose Gutierrez	Independent	23,742	16.33
Loretta dela Llana	Liberal Party	20,414	14.04
Teofilo Pantaleon Jr.	Nacionalista Party	11,979	8.24
Virgilio Abata	Liberal Party	9,837	6.77
Total		145,406	100.00
Total votes		68,049	–
Source: Commission on Elections

==== 2nd district ====
Candidate	Party	Votes	%
Wilfredo Paul Pangan	Lapiang Manggagawa	59,944	9.16
Sancho Abasta Jr.	Lakas–Kampi–CMD	58,750	8.98
Reynaldo Tarongoy	Liberal Party	55,205	8.44
Conrado Fallorin	Independent	53,455	8.17
Porfirio Elamparo	Liberal Party	45,532	6.96
Milagros Guatlo	Liberal Party	43,978	6.72
Eric Ebarle	Independent	43,110	6.59
Gigi Ejanda-Juarez	Liberal Party	39,242	6.00
Roberto Blanco	Liberal Party	37,799	5.78
Danilo Pamoleras	Independent	36,391	5.56
Erodito Paradeza	Liberal Party	33,012	5.04
Quentin Edora	Lakas–Kampi–CMD	31,297	4.78
Eddie Boy Misa	Lakas–Kampi–CMD	28,119	4.30
Jose Pacis	Lakas–Kampi–CMD	25,184	3.85
Florante Fogata	Liberal Party	22,826	3.49
Gabriel Gutierrez	Independent	13,969	2.13
Lawag Bada	Nacionalista Party	11,184	1.71
Lito Jugatan	Ang Kapatiran	6,678	1.02
Herminigildo Medina	Independent	6,163	0.94
Leonardo Dacquel	Independent	2,606	0.40
Total		654,444	100.00
Total votes		169,716	–
Source: Commission on Elections
