= 2019 Nueva Ecija local elections =

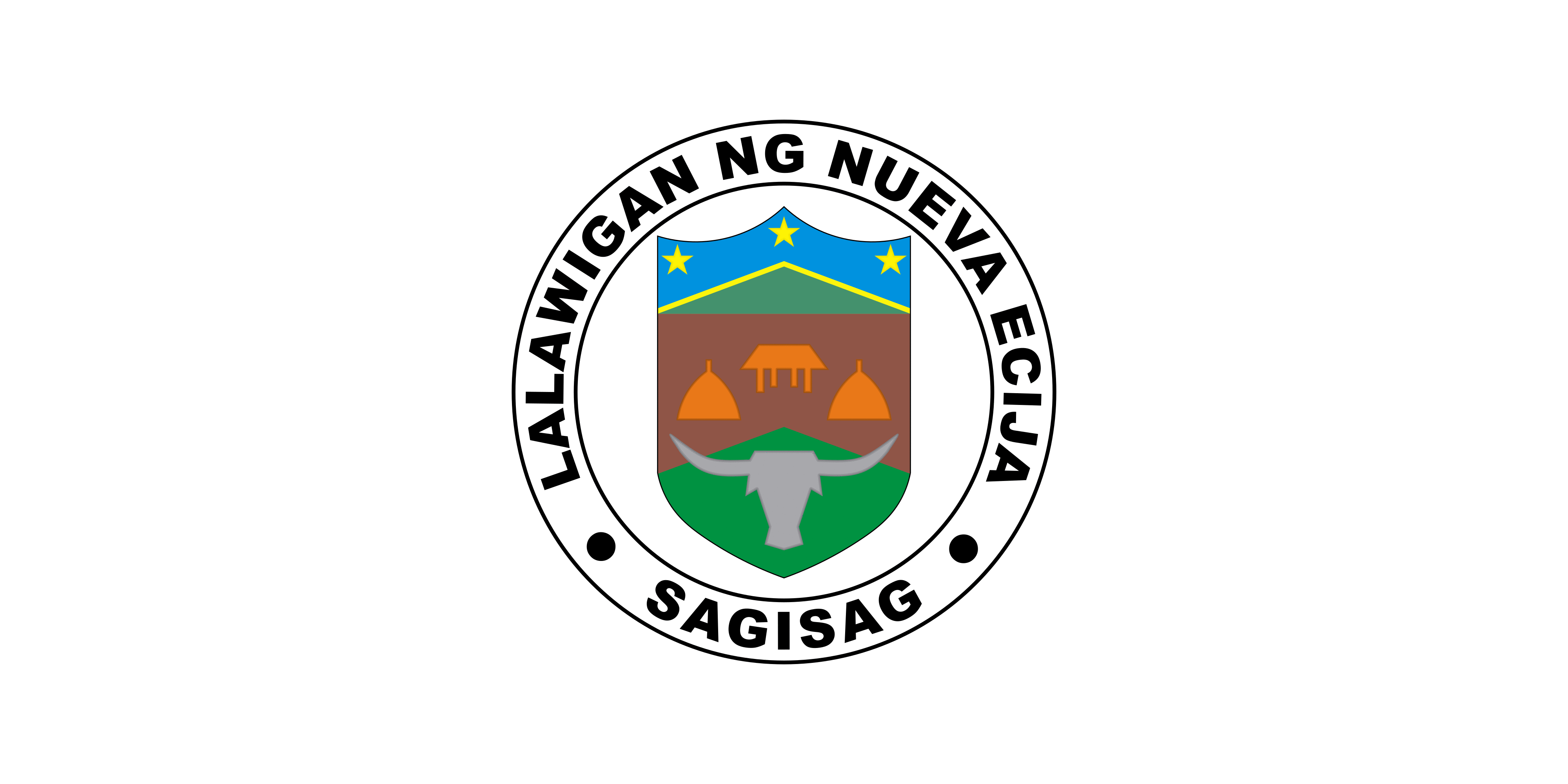
- May 13, 2019
- Gubernatorial election
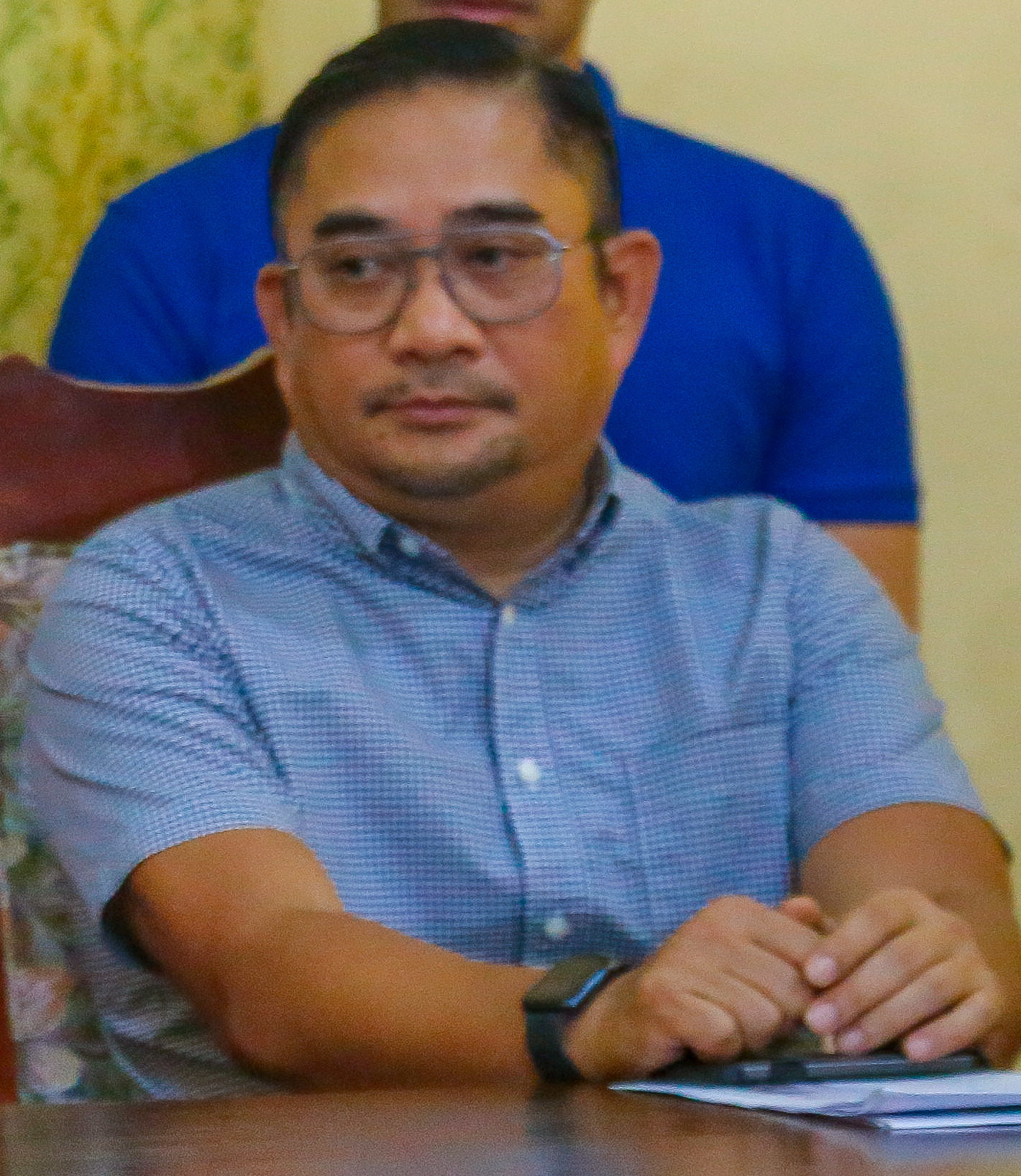

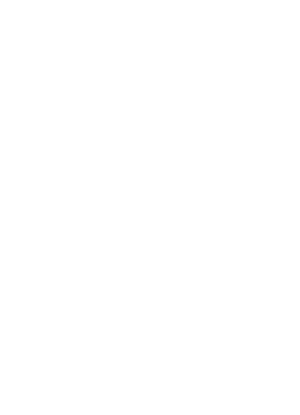

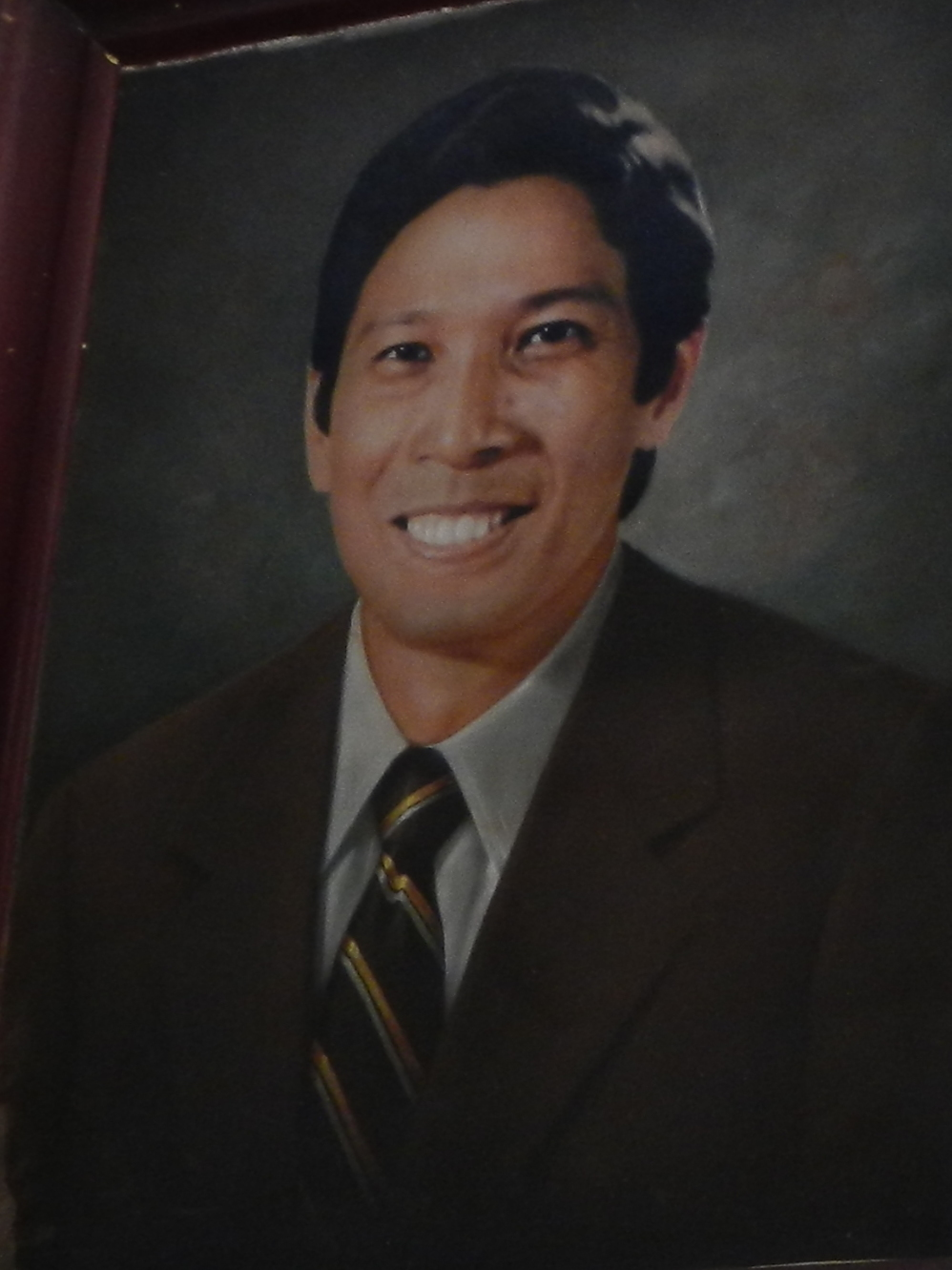
Candidate	Aurelio Umali	Virgilio Bote	Edno Joson
Party	Sigaw	PDP–Laban	Independent
Running mate	Emmanuel Umali	Edward Joson
Popular vote	477,066	337,925	94,639
Percentage	51.58%	36.54%	10.23%
Governor before election
Czarina Umali
Liberal
Elected Governor
Aurelio Umali
Sigaw
- Vice gubernatorial election
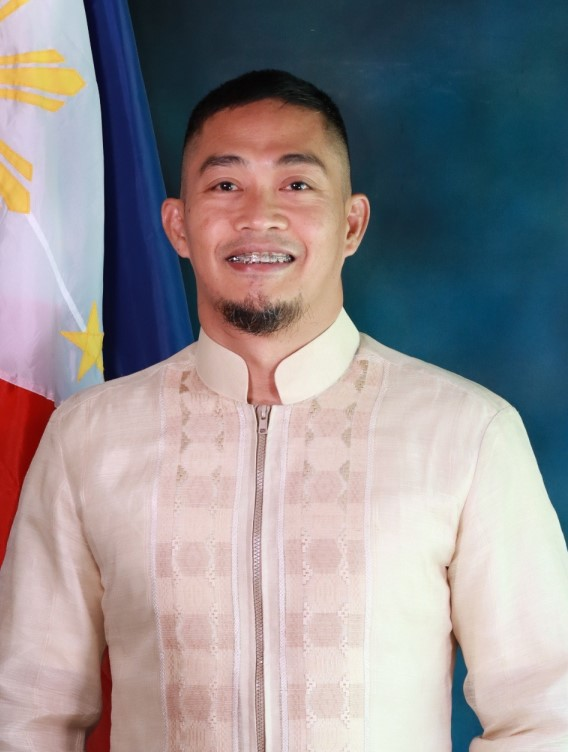

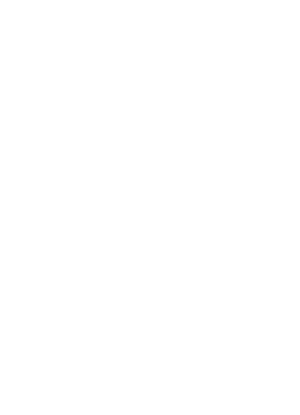

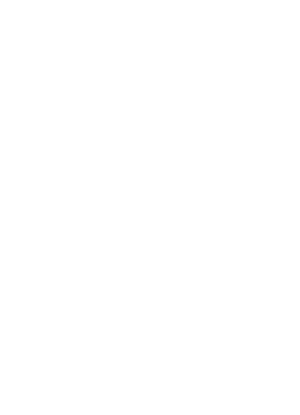
Candidate	Emmanuel Umali	Edward Joson	Manolo Tan
Party	Sigaw	PDP–Laban	PDDS
Popular vote	510,253	405,005	14,088
Percentage	54.90%	43.58%	1.52%
Vice Governor before election
GP Padiernos
Liberal
Elected Vice Governor
Emmanuel Umali
Sigaw

Local elections took place in Nueva Ecija on Monday, May 13, 2022, as part of the 2019 Philippine general election. Held concurrently with the national elections, the electorate voted to elect a governor, a vice governor, fourteen provincial board members and four district representatives to congress. Those elected took their respective offices on June 30, 2019 for a three-year-long term.

Former governor Aurelio Umali won the governorship against former General Tinio mayor Virgilio Bote, who was backed by Rodrigo Duterte’s party PDP-Laban, and former governor Eduardo “Edno” Joson. In addition, Aurelio’s brother, Dr. Emmanuel Umali, defeated former vice governor Edward Joson in the race for vice governor.

== Electoral system ==
The governor and vice governor is elected via the plurality voting system province-wide.The members are elected via plurality-at-large voting: the province is divided into four districts, the first and fourth districts sending three members each, while the second and third districts sending two members each to the provincial board; the number of candidates the electorate votes for and the number of winning candidates depends on the number of members their district sends. The vice governor is the ex officio presiding officer, and only votes to break ties.

== Results ==
=== Governor ===
Former governor Aurelio Umali won reelection with 51.58% of the vote against Virgilio Bote's 36.34%, former governor Edno Joson's 10.23% and other candidate's 1.65%.

Candidate	Party	Votes	%
Aurelio Umali	Unang Sigaw	477,066	51.58
Virgilio Bote	PDP–Laban	337,925	36.54
Edno Joson	Independent	94,639	10.23
Renato Reynaldo Maliwat	PDDS	7,313	0.79
Roberto Gavina	PFP	4,776	0.52
Constantino De Leon	Independent	3,117	0.34
Total		924,836	100.00
Unang Sigaw hold			

=== Vice Governor ===
Dr. Emmanuel Umali won with 54.90% of the vote against former vice governor Edward Joson's 43.58% and Manolo Tan's 1.52%.

Candidate	Party	Votes	%
Emmanuel Umali	Unang Sigaw	510,253	54.90
Edward Joson	PDP–Laban	405,005	43.58
Manolo Tan	PDDS	14,088	1.52
Total		929,346	100.00
Unang Sigaw hold			
