= 2025 Nueva Ecija local elections =

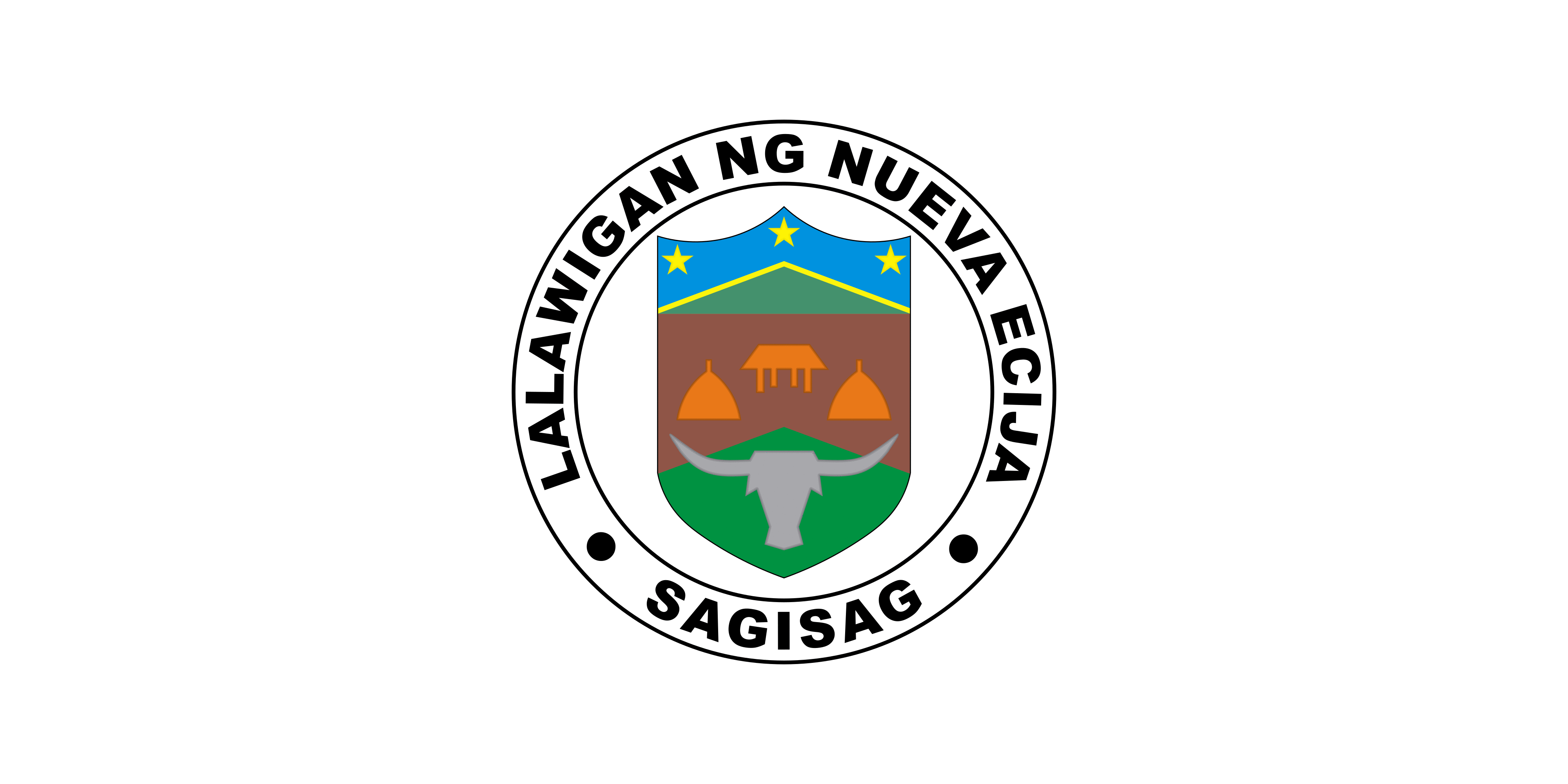
- May 12, 2025
- Gubernatorial election
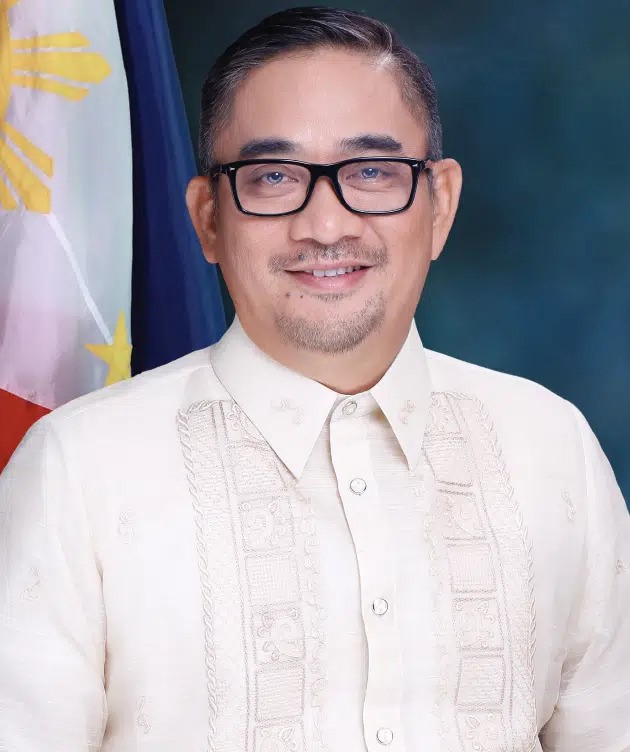
		PFP
Candidate	Aurelio Umali	Virgilio Bote
Party	Sigaw	PFP
Running mate	Lemon Umali	Edward Thomas Joson
Popular vote	977,349	227,415
Percentage	81.12%	18.88%
Governor before election
Aurelio Umali
Sigaw
Elected Governor
TBD
- Vice gubernatorial election
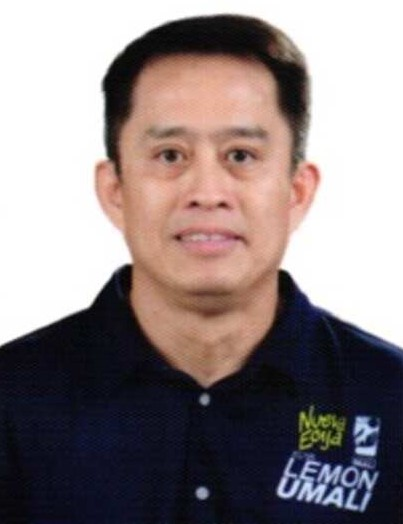
		PFP
Candidate	Lemon Umali	Edward Thomas Joson
Party	Sigaw	PFP
Popular vote	806,939	329,106
Percentage	71.03%	28.97%
Vice Governor before election
Anthony Umali
Sigaw
Elected Vice Governor
TBD
- Provincial Board election

10 out of 14 seats in the Nueva Ecija Provincial Board 8 seats needed for a majority
	First party	Second party	Third party
Party	Sigaw	PFP	Lakas
Last election	7 seats, 70.0%	Did not participate	Did not participate
Seats won	6	2	1
Seat change	▼1	▲2	▲1
Popular vote	1,090,526	514,426	167,397
Percentage	52.38	24.71	8.04
	Fourth party
Party	NUP
Last election	Did not participate
Seats won	1
Seat change	▲1
Popular vote	101,971
Percentage	4.90

Local elections were held in Nueva Ecija on May 12, 2025, as part of the 2025 Philippine general election. Nueva Ecija voters will elect a governor, a vice governor, and 10 out of 14 members of the Nueva Ecija Provincial Board.

== Governor ==
Incumbent Aurelio Umali (Unang Sigaw) is running for a third term. Umali was re-elected with 69.22% of the vote in 2022.

=== Candidates ===
The following candidates are included in the ballot:

No.	Candidate	Party
1	Virgilio Bote	Partido Federal ng Pilipinas
2	Aurelio Umali (incumbent)	Unang Sigaw

=== Results ===
Candidate	Party	Votes	%
Aurelio Umali (incumbent)	Unang Sigaw	977,349	81.12
Virgilio Bote	Partido Federal ng Pilipinas	227,415	18.88
Total		1,204,764	100.00

== Vice governor ==
Incumbent Anthony Umali (Unang Sigaw) is running for mayor of Cabanatuan. Umali was elected with 68.57% of the vote in 2022.

=== Candidates ===
The following candidates are included in the ballot:

No.	Candidate	Party
1	Edward Thomas Joson	Partido Federal ng Pilipinas
2	Lemon Umali	Unang Sigaw

=== Results ===
Candidate	Party	Votes	%
Lemon Umali	Unang Sigaw	806,939	71.03
Edward Thomas Joson	Partido Federal ng Pilipinas	329,106	28.97
Total		1,136,045	100.00

== Provincial Board ==
The Nueva Ecija Provincial Board is composed of 14 board members, 10 of whom are elected.

=== Retiring and term-limited board members ===
The following board members are retiring:

- Ler de Guzman (Unang Sigaw, 1st provincial district)
- Nap Interior (Unang Sigaw, 4th provincial district)

The following board members are term-limited:

- Jojo Matias (Partido Federal ng Pilipinas, 3rd provincial district), running for the Cabanatuan City Council.
- Rap Rap Villanueva (Unang Sigaw, 1st provincial district), running for the Talavera Municipal Council.

=== Overview ===
Party	Votes	%	Seats
Unang Sigaw	1,090,526	52.38	6
Partido Federal ng Pilipinas	514,426	24.71	2
Lakas–CMD	167,397	8.04	1
Pwersa ng Masang Pilipino	109,539	5.26	0
National Unity Party	101,971	4.90	1
Independent	98,217	4.72	0
Ex officio seats			3
Reserved seats			1
Total	2,082,076	100.00	14

=== 1st provincial district ===
Nueva Ecija's 1st provincial district consists of the same area as Nueva Ecija's 1st legislative district. Three board members are elected from this provincial district.

==== Candidates ====
The following candidates are included in the ballot:

No.	Candidate	Party
1	Rodel Cabuyaban	Independent
2	Felix Diosdado Lumang	Partido Federal ng Pilipinas
3	Baby Palilio	Unang Sigaw
4	Eric Salazar (incumbent)	Unang Sigaw
5	Rai-Rai Villanueva	Unang Sigaw

==== Results ====
Candidate	Party	Votes	%
Baby Palilio	Unang Sigaw	157,083	30.41
Rai-Rai Villanueva	Unang Sigaw	142,553	27.60
Eric Salazar (incumbent)	Unang Sigaw	134,405	26.02
Felix Diosdado Lumang	Partido Federal ng Pilipinas	48,317	9.35
Rodel Cabuyaban	Independent	34,225	6.63
Total		516,583	100.00

=== 2nd provincial district ===
Nueva Ecija's 2nd provincial district consists of the same area as Nueva Ecija's 2nd legislative district. Two board members are elected from this provincial district.

==== Candidates ====
The following candidates are included in the ballot:

No.	Candidate	Party
1	Jason Abalos (incumbent)	National Unity Party
2	Dindo Dysico (incumbenet)	Unang Sigaw
3	Joseph Oritz	Independent
4	Dingdong Nicolas (incumbent)	Partido Federal ng Pilipinas

==== Results ====
Candidate	Party	Votes	%
Dindo Dysico (incumbent)	Unang Sigaw	130,218	35.61
Jason Abalos (incumbent)	National Unity Party	101,971	27.88
Hermie Salcedo	Partido Federal ng Pilipinas	76,842	21.01
Wowowee Ortiz	Independent	56,694	15.50
Total		365,725	100.00

=== 3rd provincial district ===
Nueva Ecija's 3rd provincial district consists of the same area as Nueva Ecija's 3rd legislative district. Two board members are elected from this provincial district.

==== Candidates ====
The following candidates are included in the ballot:

No.	Candidate	Party
1	PB Garcia	Partido Federal ng Pilipinas
2	Jay Ilagan	Unang Sigaw
3	EJ Joson (incumbent)	Partido Federal ng Pilipinas
4	John Mendez	Independent

==== Results ====
Candidate	Party	Votes	%
EJ Joson (incumbent)	Partido Federal ng Pilipinas	191,961	37.59
PB Garcia	Partido Federal ng Pilipinas	171,789	33.64
Jay Ilagan	Unang Sigaw	139,563	27.33
Gilbert Mojica	Independent	7,298	1.43
Total		510,611	100.00

=== 4th provincial district ===
Nueva Ecija's 4th provincial district consists of the same area as Nueva Ecija's 4th legislative district. Three board members are elected from this provincial district.

==== Candidates ====
The following candidates are included in the ballot:

No.	Candidate	Party
1	Dodong Bautista	Lakas–CMD
2	Sweet Cruz (incumbent)	Unang Sigaw
3	Mary Grace Factor	Partido Federal ng Pilipinas
4	Julie Maxwell	Pwersa ng Masang Pilipino
5	Jon-Jon Padiernos	Unang Sigaw
6	Tess Patiag (incumbent)	Unang Sigaw

==== Results ====
Candidate	Party	Votes	%
Dodong Bautista	Lakas–CMD	167,397	24.29
Jon-Jon Padiernos	Unang Sigaw	156,453	22.70
Sweet Cruz (incumbent)	Unang Sigaw	124,983	18.14
Julie Maxwell	Pwersa ng Masang Pilipino	109,539	15.89
Tess Patiag (incumbent)	Unang Sigaw	105,268	15.27
Mary Grace Factor	Partido Federal ng Pilipinas	25,517	3.70
Total		689,157	100.00
