= 2022 Nueva Ecija local elections =

Part of the 2022 Philippine general election

2022 Nueva Ecija gubernatorial election
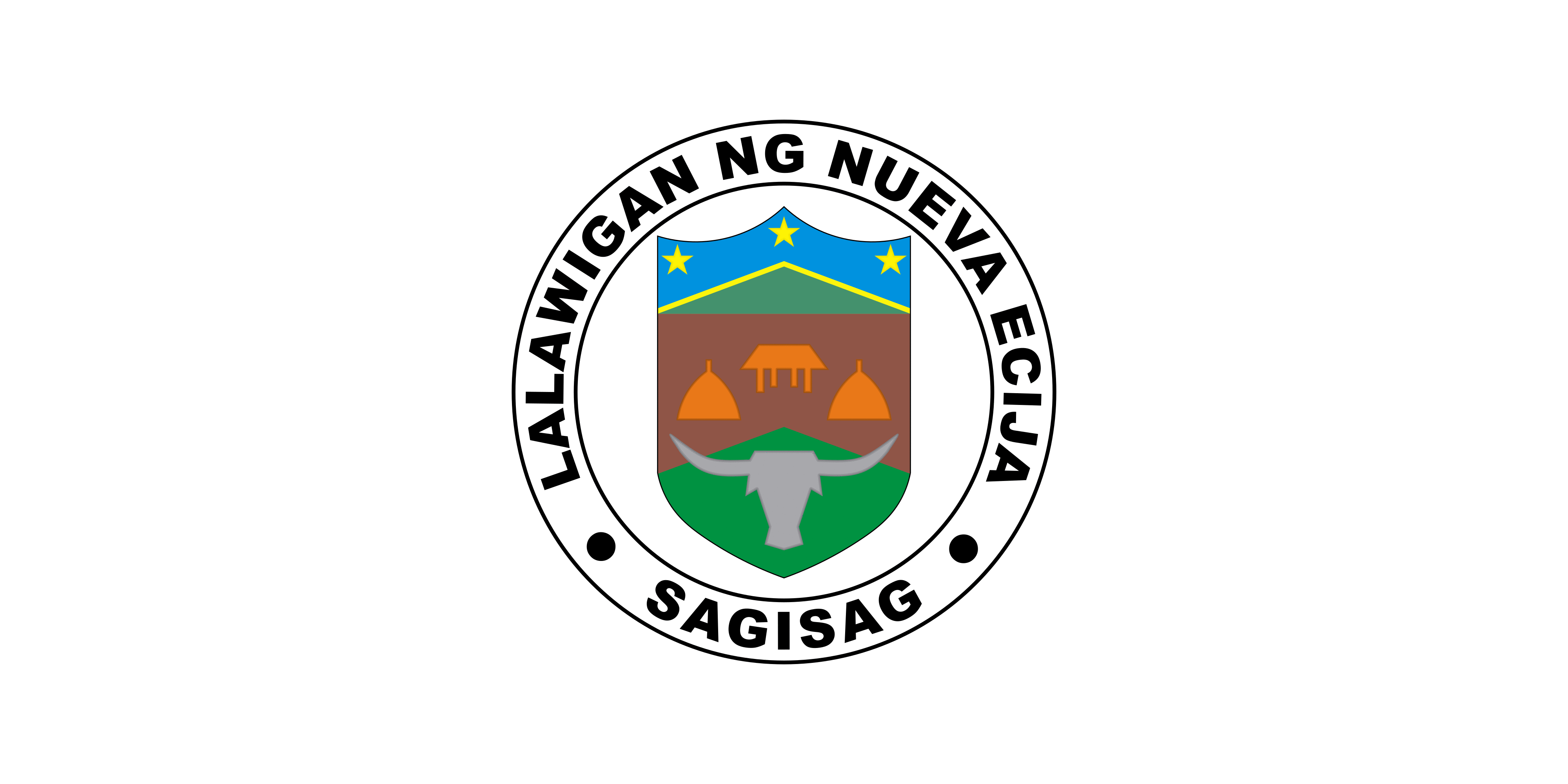
- May 9, 2022
- Gubernatorial election
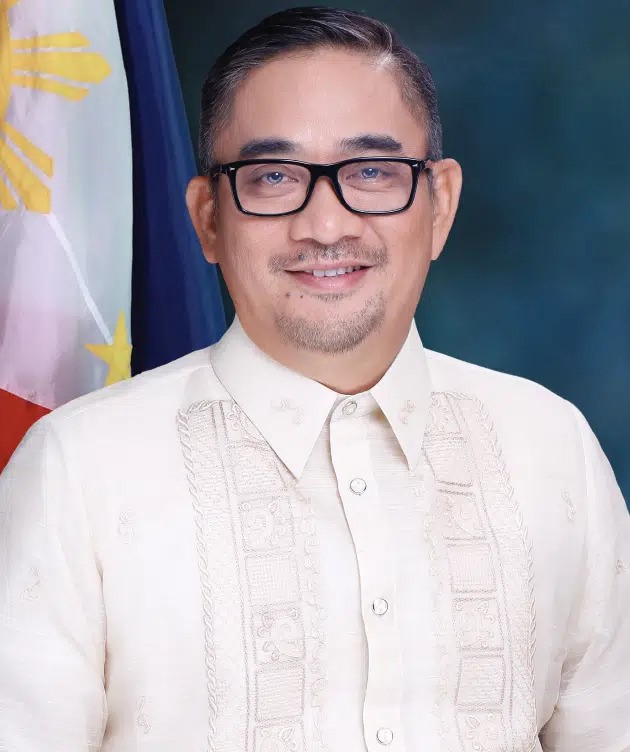

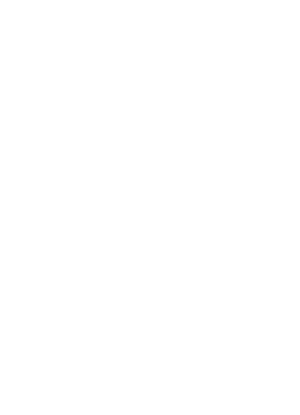
Candidate	Aurelio Umali	Adrianne Mae Cuevas
Party	Sigaw	PDP–Laban
Running mate	Emmanuel Umali	Edward Joson
Popular vote	826,876	367,716
Percentage	69.22%	30.78%
Governor before election
Aurelio Umali
Sigaw
Elected Governor
Aurelio Umali
Sigaw
- Vice gubernatorial election
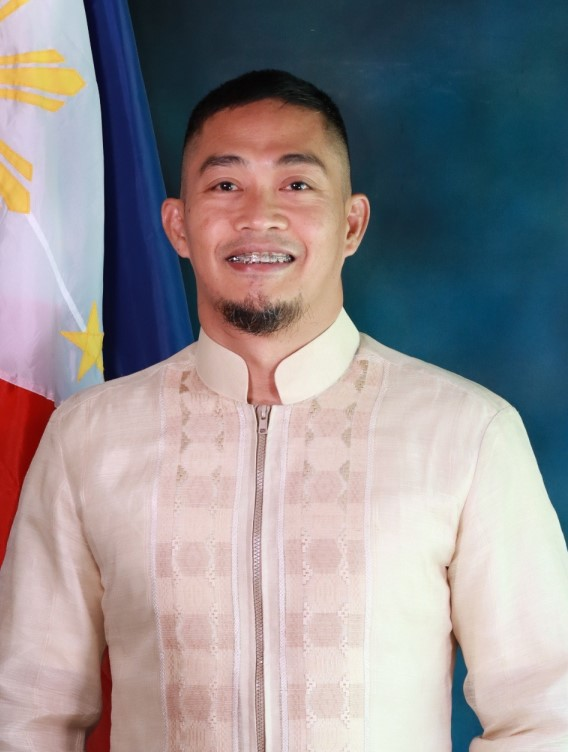

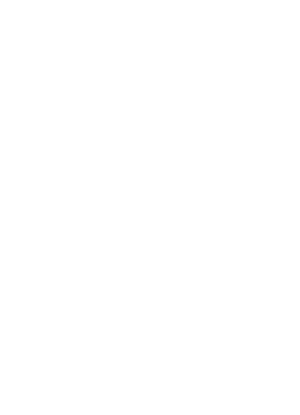
Candidate	Emmanuel Umali	Edward Joson
Party	Sigaw	PDP–Laban
Popular vote	786,167	349,184
Percentage	68.56%	30.45%
Vice Governor before election
Emmanuel Umali
Sigaw
Elected Vice Governor
Emmanuel Umali
Sigaw

Local elections took place in Nueva Ecija on Monday, May 9, 2022, as part of the 2022 Philippine general election. Held concurrently with the national elections, the electorate voted to elect a governor, a vice governor, fourteen provincial board members and four district representatives to congress. Those elected took their respective offices on June 30, 2022, for a three-year-long term. 1,297,243 voters voted in this election.

Incumbent governor Aurelio Umali won reelection in a landslide victory against Palayan mayor Adrianne Mae Cuevas. Umali's brother, incumbent vice governor Emmanuel Umali also won reelection by a landslide against former vice governor Edward Joson and Victoria Capinpin. Umali and Joson also faced each other in the previous race for the vice governorship.

== Electoral system ==
The governor and vice governor is elected via the plurality voting system province-wide.The members are elected via plurality-at-large voting: the province is divided into four districts, the first and fourth districts sending three members each, while the second and third districts sending two members each to the provincial board; the number of candidates the electorate votes for and the number of winning candidates depends on the number of members their district sends. The vice governor is the ex officio presiding officer, and only votes to break ties.

== Results ==
=== Governor ===
Incumbent governor Aurelio Umali won reelection with 69.21% of the vote against Palayan mayor Adrianne Mae Cuevas 30.78%.

Candidate	Party	Votes	%
Aurelio Umali	Unang Sigaw	826,876	69.22
Adrianne Mae Cuevas	PDP–Laban	367,716	30.78
Total		1,194,592	100.00
Unang Sigaw hold			

=== Vice Governor ===
Incumbent vice governor Emmanuel Umali won reelection with 68.56% of the vote against former vice governor Edward Joson's 30.45% and Victoria Capinpin's 0.98%.

Candidate	Party	Votes	%
Emmanuel Umali	Unang Sigaw	786,167	68.57
Edward Joson	PDP–Laban	349,184	30.45
Victoria Capinpin	Independent	11,240	0.98
Total		1,146,591	100.00
Unang Sigaw hold			

=== Provincial Board ===
The Nueva Ecija Provincial Board is composed of 14 board members, 10 of whom are elected.

Unang Sigaw won seven seats, remaining as the largest party in the provincial board.

Party	Votes	%	Seats	+/–
Unang Sigaw	1,271,799	59.14	7	+1
PDP–Laban	859,442	39.97	3	+1
Independent	19,216	0.89	0	–1
Total	2,150,457	100.00	10	0
Total votes	1,297,243	–		
Registered voters/turnout	1,541,685	84.14		

==== 1st district ====
Nueva Ecija's 1st provincial district consists of the same area as Nueva Ecija's 1st legislative district. Two board members are elected from this provincial district.

Seven candidates were included in the ballot.

Candidate	Party	Votes	%
Rap Rap Villanueva (incumbent)	Unang Sigaw	166,514	27.53
Eric Salazar (incumbent)	Unang Sigaw	140,105	23.16
Ler de Guzman (incumbent)	Unang Sigaw	106,885	17.67
Fred Domingo	PDP–Laban	70,559	11.67
Richard Maliwat	PDP–Laban	62,775	10.38
Glenn Corpus	PDP–Laban	49,201	8.13
Aris Mateo	Independent	8,824	1.46
Total		604,863	100.00
Total votes		325,958	–
Registered voters/turnout		388,005	84.01
Source: Commission on Elections

==== 2nd district ====
Nueva Ecija's 2nd provincial district consists of the same area as Nueva Ecija's 2nd legislative district. Two board members are elected from this provincial district.

Three candidates were included in the ballot.

Candidate	Party	Votes	%
Jason Abalos	PDP–Laban	139,242	43.15
Dindo Dysico	Unang Sigaw	94,399	29.25
Wowowee Ortiz (incumbent)	Unang Sigaw	89,077	27.60
Total		322,718	100.00
Total votes		269,103	–
Registered voters/turnout		319,000	84.36
Source: Commission on Elections

==== 3rd district ====
Nueva Ecija's 3rd provincial district consists of the same area as Nueva Ecija's 3rd legislative district. Two board members are elected from this provincial district.

Four candidates were included in the ballot.

Candidate	Party	Votes	%
EJ Joson (incumbent)	PDP–Laban	152,164	30.88
Jojo Matias (incumbent)	PDP–Laban	144,775	29.38
Norgen Castillo	Unang Sigaw	109,001	22.12
Suka Garcia	Unang Sigaw	86,772	17.61
Total		492,712	100.00
Total votes		354,792	–
Registered voters/turnout		431,025	82.31
Source: Commission on Elections

==== 4th district ====
Nueva Ecija's 4th provincial district consists of the same area as Nueva Ecija's 4th legislative district. Two board members are elected from this provincial district.

Seven candidates were included in the ballot.

Candidate	Party	Votes	%
Nap Interior (incumbent)	Unang Sigaw	174,282	23.87
Tess Patiag (incumbent)	Unang Sigaw	153,255	20.99
Sweet Cruz	Unang Sigaw	151,509	20.75
Mikee Dayupay	PDP–Laban	85,755	11.74
Gerry dela Cruz	PDP–Laban	77,492	10.61
Adonis Balagtas	PDP–Laban	77,479	10.61
Raniel Bautista	Independent	10,392	1.42
Total		730,164	100.00
Total votes		347,390	–
Registered voters/turnout		403,655	86.06
Source: Commission on Elections
