= Jan Rurik Padiernos =

Filipino lawyer and politician (born 1990)

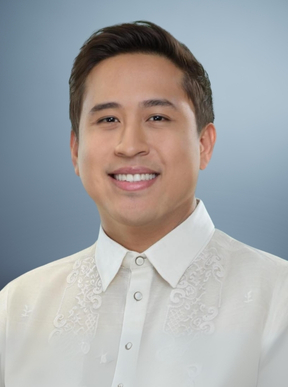
- Official portrait, 2025

Member of the House of Representatives of the Philippines from Galing sa Puso Party
- Incumbent
- Assumed office June 30, 2025
- Preceded by: Jose Gay Padiernos

Personal details
- Born: Jan Rurik de Leon Padiernos; January 16, 1990 (age 36)
- Party: Galing sa Puso (partylist; 2024–present)
- Occupation: Politician
- Profession: Lawyer

Jan Rurik "JP" de Leon Padiernos (born January 16, 1990) is a Filipino lawyer and politician currently serving as a member of the House of Representatives of the Philippines since 2025, representing the Galing sa Puso Party in the 20th Congress.

== Early life ==
Jan Rurik Padiernos was born on January 16, 1990.

== Political career ==
Padiernos was a nominee for Galing sa Puso Party in the 2025 elections. His platform included wanting to replicate the rice production model in Nueva Ecija nationwide.

Padiernos assumed office on June 30, 2025, after being elected as a party-list representative under Galing sa Puso in the House of Representatives of the Philippines. In the 20th Congress, he aligned himself with the opposition bloc and joined other lawmakers in expressing support for the continued leadership of Marcelino Libanan as House Minority Leader.

His father, then-Vice Governor Jose Gay Padiernos, publicly expressed pride in Jan Rurik after he passed the 2016 Bar Examination, alongside his cousin, Maricel Padiernos.
