= Galing sa Puso Party =

Filipino political party-list

Galing sa Puso
- — Philippine partylist —
- Full name: Galing sa Puso
- Abbreviation: GP
- Sector(s) represented: Multi-sector
- Colors: Red; Blue

Current representation (20th Congress)
- Seats in the House of Representatives: 1 / 3 (Out of 63 party-list seats)
- Representative(s): Jan Rurik Padiernos

The Galing sa Puso (transl. from the heart), commonly known as the GP Partylist is a party-list organization based in the Philippines. First running in the 2019 elections, they gained one seat.

== Background ==
According to their Facebook page, their platform includes programs for the people, including livelihood, justice, health, knowledge, and the environment. They opposed price hikes, calling for legislative action against them. They supported reforms to prevent financial losses for farmers and to prevent food waste.

== History ==
=== 18th Congress ===
The party-list ran in the 2019 Philippine House of Representatives elections under the name GP. The party aimed to represent poverty reduction and urban and rural concerns. They also supported programs for livelihood, justice, and health. The party gained 34th place with 249,278 votes, 0.90 percent of the votes. The party gained one seat in the 18th Congress of the Philippines, being proclaimed on June 10, 2019. The first nominee, Jose Gay Padiernos, took the seat.

=== 19th Congress ===
The party-list ran in the 2022 Philippine House of Representatives elections. They filed their certificate of nomination on October 5, 2022. They gained 331,938 votes, 0.92 percent of the votes. The party-list gained one seat, taken by first nominee Padiernos.

=== 20th Congress ===
The party-list ran in the 2025 Philippine House of Representatives elections. In the January 2025 OCTA survey, Galing Sa Puso gained 7th place. During their run, their main concern was the rising prices of basic goods. In a poll by Pulse Asia conducted on April 20 to 24, Galing sa Puso gained 1.43 percent of the votes. In the elections, they gained 30th place with 381,350 votes, 0.92 percent of the votes. The party-list gained one seat, gained by first nominee Jan Rurik Padiernos.

== Electoral performance ==
Election	Votes	%	Seats
2019	249,278	0.90	1 / 63
2022	331,938	0.92	1 / 63
2025	381,350	0.92	1 / 63

== Representatives to Congress ==
Period	Representative
18th Congress; 2019–2022	Jose Gay Padiernos
19th Congress; 2022–2025	Jose Gay Padiernos
20th Congress; 2025–2028 (upcoming)	Jan Rurik Padiernos
Note: A party-list group, can win a maximum of three seats in the House of Representatives.
