= 2013 Philippine House of Representatives elections in Central Luzon =

Elections were held in Central Luzon for seats in the House of Representatives of the Philippines on May 13, 2013.

The candidate with the most votes won that district's seat for the 16th Congress of the Philippines.

== Summary ==
Party	Popular vote	%	Swing	Seats won	Change
Liberal				8	
NUP				4	
NPC				3	
Nacionalista				2	
KAMBILAN				1	
Lakas				1	
LDP				1	
Aksyon				0	
BALANE				0	
Makabayan				0	
PDP–Laban				0	
PMP				0	
SZP				0	
UNA				0	
Sigaw				0	
Independent				0	
Valid votes				21	
Invalid votes					
Turnout					
Registered voters					

== Aurora ==
Incumbent Juan Edgardo Angara is term limited and is instead running for the Senate. His aunt, Governor Bellaflor Angara-Castillo, is his party's nominee.

2013 Philippine House of Representatives election at Aurora
Party	Candidate	Votes	%
LDP	Bellaflor Angara-Castillo	41,319	61.37
Nacionalista	Rodrigo Montero	16,832	25.00
Independent	Teofilo Manalo	1,472	2.19
Margin of victory		24,487	36.37%
Invalid or blank votes		7,704	11.44
Total votes		67,327	100.00
LDP hold			

== Bataan ==
=== 1st District ===
Incumbent Herminia Roman is being challenged by Bases Conversion and Development Authority chairman Felicito Payumo; Payumo substituted for Edwin Enrile.

2013 Philippine House of Representatives election at Bataan's 1st district
Party	Candidate	Votes	%
Liberal	Herminia Roman	87,535	55.70
NPC	Felicito Payumo	60,084	38.24
Margin of victory		27,451	17.47%
Invalid or blank votes		9,524	6.06
Total votes		157,143	100.00
Liberal hold			

=== 2nd District ===
Incumbent Albert S. Garcia is term limited; his father Governor Enrique Garcia is his party's nominee. Actor Onemig Bondoc of Aksyon Demokratiko withdrew his candidacy on February 5.

2013 Philippine House of Representatives election at Bataan's 2nd district
Party	Candidate	Votes	%
NUP	Enrique Garcia	120,825	61.46
NPC	Leonardo Roman	53,070	27.00
Makabayan	Reynan Calderon	1,745	0.89
Margin of victory		67,755	34.46%
Aksyon	Onemig Bondoc (Spoiled Votes)	3,549	1.81
Invalid or blank votes		20,951	8.85
Total votes		196,591	100.00
NUP hold			

== Bulacan ==
=== 1st District ===
Ma. Victoria Sy-Alvarado is the incumbent.

2013 Philippine House of Representatives election at Bulacan's 1st district
Party	Candidate	Votes	%
NUP	Ma. Victoria Sy-Alvarado	155,783	74.61
Independent	Sahiron Salim	7,972	3.82
Margin of victory		147,811	70.79%
Invalid or blank votes		45,041	21.57
Total votes		208,796	100.00
NUP hold			

=== 2nd District ===
Incumbent Pedro Pancho is term limited; his son Gavini is his party's nominee.

Independent candidate Pancho Ordanes withdrew his candidacy.

2013 Philippine House of Representatives election at Bulacan's 2nd district
Party	Candidate	Votes	%
NUP	Gavini Pancho	143,705	54.33
Liberal	Pedrito Canisio Mendoza	88,285	33.38
Independent	Jimmy Villafuerte	5,092	1.93
Independent	Joseph Cristobal	2,274	0.86
PDP–Laban	Antonio Deborja	729	0.28
Margin of victory		55,420	20.95%
Invalid or blank votes		24,396	9.22
Total votes		264,481	100.00
NUP hold			

=== 3rd District ===
Joselito Andrew Mendoza is the incumbent.

2013 Philippine House of Representatives election at Bulacan's 3rd district
Party	Candidate	Votes	%
Liberal	Joselito Andrew Mendoza	102,624	49.76
UNA	Jose Cabochan	46,955	22.77
Independent	Enrique Viudez	29,710	14.41
PMP	Ricardo Silverio Jr.	3,422	1.66
Margin of victory		55,669	26.99%
Invalid or blank votes		23,530	11.41
Total votes		206,241	100.00
Liberal hold			

=== 4th District ===
Linabelle Villarica is the incumbent.

2013 Philippine House of Representatives election at Bulacan's 4th district
Party	Candidate	Votes	%
Liberal	Linabelle Villarica	183,983	79.70
Independent	Jovel Lopez	18,598	8.06
Margin of victory		165,385	71.65%
Invalid or blank votes		28,249	12.24
Total votes		230,830	100.00
Liberal hold			

=== San Jose del Monte ===
Arthur Robes is the incumbent. On early February, the Commission on Elections' Second Division disqualified his primary opponent, singer Imelda Papin for failure of proving her residence in the city; the complaint was filed by Arangkada San Joseno Political Party, which said that she is actually a resident of nearby North Fairview, Quezon City. However, the commission en banc overturned the Second Division's decision, thereby allowing Papin to run.

2013 Philippine House of Representatives election at San Jose del Monte
Party	Candidate	Votes	%
Liberal	Arthur Robes	74,302	57.65
Lakas	Imelda Papin	37,256	28.90
Independent	Oscar Robes	2,571	1.99
Independent	Albert Rejante	1,605	1.25
Independent	Roger Montinola	925	0.72
Independent	Ian Miso	711	0.55
Margin of victory		37,046	28.74%
Invalid or blank votes		11,522	8.94
Total votes		128,892	100.00
Liberal hold			

== Nueva Ecija ==
=== 1st District ===
Incumbent Josefina Joson is running for the governorship. Her husband Quezon mayor Mariano Cristino Joson is his partys nominee.

2013 Philippine House of Representatives election at Nueva Ecijas 1st district
Party	Candidate	Votes	%
Sigaw	Estrellita Suansing	94,952	45.12
NPC	Mariano Cristino Joson	78,267	37.19
Independent	Renato Diaz	14,805	7.03
Margin of victory		16,685	7.93%
Invalid or blank votes		22,427	10.66
Total votes		210,451	100.00

=== 2nd District ===
Incumbent Joseph Gilbert Violago is running unopposed.

2013 Philippine House of Representatives election at Nueva Ecija's 2nd district
Party	Candidate	Votes	%
Liberal	Joseph Gilbert Violago	133,155	77.72
Invalid or blank votes		38,175	22.28
Total votes		171,330	100.00
Liberal hold			

=== 3rd District ===
Czarina Umali is the Incumbent.

2013 Philippine House of Representatives election at Nueva Ecija's 3rd district
Party	Candidate	Votes	%
Liberal	Czarina Umali	123,981	55.10
UNA	J.V. Bautista	68,806	30.60
Independent	Jayorlando Valinio	4,877	2.17
Margin of victory		55,805	24.50%
Invalid or blank votes		27,287	12.14
Total votes		224,861	100.00
Liberal hold			

=== 4th District ===
Incumbent Rodolfo Antonino is term limited; his daughter Magnolia Antonino-Nadres is his party's nominee.

2013 Philippine House of Representatives election at Nueva Ecija's 4th district
Party	Candidate	Votes	%
NUP	Magnolia Antonino-Nadres	121,494	53.42
BALANE	Orlando Nagaño	39,372	17.31
NPC	Julita Villareal	29,118	12.80
Liberal	Aurora Sonia Lorenzo	19,067	8.38
Margin of victory		82,122	36.11%
Invalid or blank votes		18,384	8.08
Total votes		227,435	100.00
NUP hold			

== Pampanga ==
=== 1st District ===
Incumbent Carmelo Lazatin is not running instead he is running for mayor of Angeles City, Lakas-CMD thru the local party KAMBILAN nominates basketball coach and incumbent Vice-Governor Yeng Guiao. he will face former Congressman Francis Nepomuceno.

2013 Philippine House of Representatives election at Pampanga's 1st district
Party	Candidate	Votes	%
KAMBILAN	Yeng Guiao	96,433	51.82
NPC	Francis Nepomuceno	73,100	39.28
Margin of victory		23,333	12.54%
Invalid or blank votes		16,551	8.89
Total votes		186,084	100.00
KAMBILAN gain from Lakas			

=== 2nd District ===
Incumbent Gloria Macapagal Arroyo is running despite her sickness and in hospital arrest.

2013 Philippine House of Representatives election at Pampanga's 2nd district
Party	Candidate	Votes	%
Lakas	Gloria Macapagal Arroyo	149,344	78.24
Liberal	Vivian Dabu	16,238	8.51
Independent	Charlie Chua	1,966	1.03
Independent	Josefina Leoncio	1,271	0.67
Margin of victory		133,106	69.73%
Invalid or blank votes		22,065	11.56
Total votes		190,884	100.00
Lakas hold			

=== 3rd District ===
Aurelio Gonzales Jr. is the incumbent. He will be facing-off incumbent San Fernando City Mayor Oscar Samson Rodriguez.

2013 Philippine House of Representatives election at Pampanga's 3rd district
Party	Candidate	Votes	%
Liberal	Oscar Samson Rodriguez	125,511	53.88
NPC	Aurelio Gonzales Jr.	95,437	40.97
Margin of victory		30,074	12.91%
Invalid or blank votes		12,015	5.16
Total votes		232,963	100.00
Liberal gain from NPC			

=== 4th District ===
Incumbent Anna York Bondoc is term limited; her brother Juan Pablo Bondoc is her party's nominee.

2013 Philippine House of Representatives election at Pampanga's 4th district
Party	Candidate	Votes	%
Nacionalista	Juan Pablo Bondoc	105,610	50.84
NPC	Jerry Pelayo	83,585	40.23
Independent	Ramon Sediego	830	0.40
Margin of victory		22,025	10.60%
Invalid or blank votes		17,724	8.53
Total votes		207,749	100.00
Nacionalista hold			

== Tarlac ==
=== 1st District ===
Incumbent Enrique Cojuangco is running unopposed.

2013 Philippine House of Representatives election at Tarlac's 1st district
Party	Candidate	Votes	%
NPC	Enrique Cojuangco	112,506	69.08
Invalid or blank votes		50,365	30.92
Total votes		162,871	100.00
NPC hold			

=== 2nd District ===
Susan Sulit is the incumbent.

2013 Philippine House of Representatives election at Tarlac's 2nd district
Party	Candidate	Votes	%
NPC	Susan Yap-Sulit	121,341	68.04
Lakas	Josefino Rigor	34,750	19.48
Independent	Ernesto Calma	1,753	0.98
Margin of victory		86,591	48.55%
Invalid or blank votes		20,499	11.49
Total votes		178,343	100.00
NPC hold			

=== 3rd District ===
Jeci Lapus is the incumbent, he was defeated by Concepcion mayor Noel Villanueva.

2013 Philippine House of Representatives election at Tarlac's 3rd district
Party	Candidate	Votes	%
Nacionalista	Noel Villanueva	65,465	53.73
NUP	Jeci Lapus	27,345	22.44
Liberal	Herminio Aquino	23,034	18.90
Margin of victory		38,120	31.28%
Invalid or blank votes		6,006	4.93
Total votes		121,850	100.00
Nacionalista gain from NUP			

== Zambales ==
=== 1st District ===
Incumbent Mitos Magsaysay is term limited; she is running for the Senate; her son, Jesus Vicente II or Jobo, is her party's nominee. he will face outgoing olongapo city mayor James Gordon Jr. and former subic mayor Jeffrey Khonghun.

2013 Philippine House of Representatives election at Zambales' 1st district
Party	Candidate	Votes	%
NPC	Jeffrey Khonghun	45,434	54.58
Liberal	James Gordon Jr.	22,068	26.51
UNA	Jesus Vicente "Jobo" Magsaysay II	11,189	13.44
Margin of victory		23,366	28.07%
Invalid or blank votes		4,556	5.47
Total votes		83,247	100.00
NPC gain from UNA			

=== 2nd District ===
Incumbent Jun Omar Ebdane succeeded Antonio M. Diaz in a special election when the latter died in 2011.

2013 Philippine House of Representatives election at Zambales' 2nd district
Party	Candidate	Votes	%
Liberal	Cheryl Deloso-Montalla	74,229	51.77
SZP	Jun Omar Ebdane	60,280	42.04
Margin of victory		13,949	9.73%
Invalid or blank votes		8,877	6.19
Total votes		143,386	100.00
Liberal gain from SZP			
