= Unang Sigaw =

Unang Sigaw Partido ng Pagbabago
- Leader: Aurelio Umali
- Founded: 2007
- National affiliation: Lakas–CMD (2010); Liberal (2013); HNP (2019)
- Colours: Dark blue
- House of Representatives (Nueva Ecija seats): 2 / 4
- Provincial Governor: 1 / 1
- Provincial Vice Governor: 1 / 1
- Nueva Ecija Provincial Board: 7 / 14

Unang Sigaw Partido ng Pagbabago (lit. 'First Cry Party of Change', referencing the Cry of Nueva Ecija) is a political party in the province of Nueva Ecija, Philippines. It is led by Aurelio Umali, the governor of Nueva Ecija.

== History ==
Aurelio Umali defeated vice governor Mariano Cristino Joson in the 2007 gubernatorial election, ending the Josons' 48-year hold of the Nueva Ecija governorship. In 2010, Umali and Jose Gay Padiernos won the gubernatorial and vice gubernatorial elections by landslides, defeating the rival ticket of Edward Thomas Joson and Rommel Padilla by Bagong Lakas ng Nueva Ecija (BALANE). This was the third consecutive win by Umali against the Josons. In 2010, Unang Sigaw was affiliated with Lakas Kampi CMD. In 2013, now allied with the Liberal Party, the Umali–Padiernos tandem again defeated the BALANE ticket of Padilla and Manuel Joson, with Padiernos becoming the first non-Umali to beat a Joson in a province-wide election.

In 2016, Umali was succeeded by his wife House representative Czarina, becoming the first woman governor after defeating Rodolfo Antonino, while Aurelio, running under the Liberal Party, lost his bid to succeed his wife as House representative to Ria Vergara, his first electoral defeat. The party then supported the federalization drive of President Rodrigo Duterte. In time for the 2019 elections, Unang Sigaw forged an alliance with Sara Duterte's Hugpong ng Pagbabago. The party was also named by the Commission on Elections as a major local party in Nueva Ecija. In the election, Czarina was defeated in her bid to return to Congress by Vergara, while Aurelio, who was disqualified by the Ombudsman to hold public office in relation to the pork barrel scam, was allowed to reclaim the provincial capitol after securing a Court of Appeals injunction against the Ombudsman.

In the 2022 election, President Duterte backed Unang Sigaw's opponent, Palayan mayor Adrianne Mae Cuevas against Aurelio Umali. The party kept its status as a major local party in the province. Unang Sigaw put up Aurelio for governor, and his brother Emmanuel for vice governor. The Unang Sigaw ticket still won the 2022 elections, with the Umalis defeating Cuevas and Edward Joson for governor and vice governor, respectively.

== Electoral results ==
=== Gubernatorial elections ===
Year	Candidate	Votes	%	Result	Note
2007	Aurelio Umali	434,445	58.02	Won	
2010	Aurelio Umali	517,852	61.72	Won	Under Lakas–Kampi
2013	Aurelio Umali	470,824	62.30	Won	Under Liberal
2016	Czarina Umali	575,167	61.84	Won	Under Liberal
2019	Aurelio Umali	477,066	51.58	Won	Under Hugpong ng Pagbabago
2022	Aurelio Umali	826,876	69.21	Won	
2025	Aurelio Umali	983,805	81.12	Won	Under Lakas–CMD

=== House of Representatives elections ===
Election	Seats allocated for Nueva Ecija	Outcome of election
2010	1 / 4	Joined the majority
2013	1 / 4	Joined the majority
2016	0 / 4	Lost
2019	0 / 4	Lost
2022	1 / 4	Joined the majority
2025	2 / 4	Joined the majority
