= Fortune Aleta-Ledesma =

Filipino optometrist and diplomat

Honorary Consul General of Monaco to the Philippines

Personal details
- Born: Fortune Fontanilla Aleta Cabanatuan, Nueva Ecija, Philippines
- Spouse: Rene Locsin Ledesma
- Children: 3, including RJ Ledesma
- Parent(s): Gov. Amado Aleta; Corazon Fontanilla Farro
- Occupation: Optometrist, diplomat, philanthropist
- Awards: (Monaco) Chevalier of the Order of Saint Charles (2008) (France) Chevalier of the National Order of Merit (2015) (Austria) Decoration of Honour in Gold

Fortune Aleta-Ledesma (born Fortune Fontanilla Aleta) is a Filipino optometrist, diplomat, and philanthropist. She is the Honorary Consul General of the Principality of Monaco to the Philippines and has previously served as the Dean of the Consular Corps of the Philippines.

She is the first Filipino to be appointed as a Chevalier (Knight) of the Monégasque Order of Saint Charles.

== Early life and education ==
Aleta was raised in Cabanatuan, Nueva Ecija. She is the daughter of former Nueva Ecija Governor Amado Aleta, a military official, and Corazon Fontanilla Farro, a schoolteacher from La Union.

She studied optometry and topped the government board examinations for optometrists.

== Pageantry ==
Aleta was the first runner-up in both the 1968 Miss Philippines for Miss International and in the Mutya ng Pilipinas for Miss Asia Pacific.

== Diplomatic career ==
Aleta-Ledesma is the Honorary Consul General of the Principality of Monaco. She is also the chairperson of the Johann Strauss Society of the Philippines, which raises funds to promote classical music and support charitable institutions, and has served as the president of the Inner Wheel Club of Manila. Her philanthropic projects include fundraising for the Virlanie Children's shelter and indigent pediatric units at the Philippine General Hospital.

== Personal life ==
She is married to Rene Ledesma, a corporate entrepreneur who serves as the Honorary Consul of Bulgaria to the Philippines. The couple has three children: Rina, Rico, and Rene Jr., better known as the media personality and entrepreneur RJ Ledesma.

== Honors and decorations ==
- 2008 – Chevalier (Knight) of the Order of Saint Charles (Monaco)
- Decoration of Honour in Gold for services rendered to the Republic of Austria
- 2015 – Chevalier (Knight) of the National Order of Merit (France)
