= Jason Abalos =

Filipino actor and politician (born 1985)

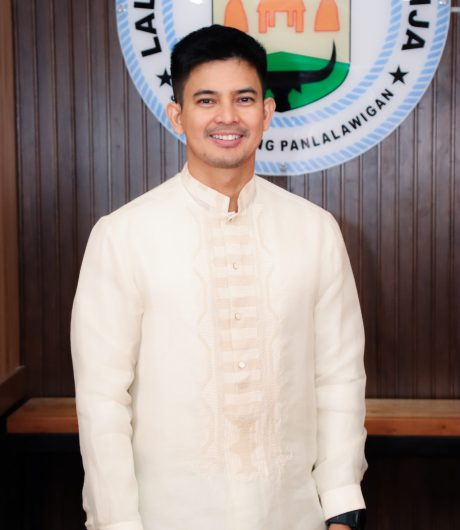
- Official portrait, 2022

Member of the Nueva Ecija Provincial Board from the 2nd district
- Incumbent
- Assumed office June 30, 2022

Personal details
- Born: Jason Jimenez Abalos; January 14, 1986 (age 40) Pantabangan, Nueva Ecija, Philippines
- Party: NUP (2024–present)
- Other political affiliations: PDP–Laban (2021–2024); Liberal (2015–2016)
- Spouse: Vickie Rushton (m. 2022)
- Children: 1
- Education: Nueva Ecija University of Science and Technology
- Occupation: Actor, host, model, endorser

Jason Jimenez Abalos (born January 14, 1986) is a Filipino actor, host, model, endorser and politician. Abalos is currently an exclusive actor of GMA Network.

== Acting career ==
Abalos is a former member of Star Magic talents until 2017. He was discovered after joining Star Circle Quest, a reality show in search of new actors. On August 7, 2008, he won Best Performance by Male or Female, Adult or Child, Individual or Ensemble in Leading or Supporting Role award in the Young Critics Circle Annual Citation held at the Faculty Center Conference (Pulungang Recto, Bulwagang Rizal) Hall of the University of the Philippines Diliman, Quezon City. The award was for his role in the indie film Adela, directed by Adolfo Alix, Jr. and starring Anita Linda (in the 2008 Cinemalaya Independent Film Festival).

On October 1, 2008, he won the Best Actor in the 2008 Gawad Urian Awards for Endo.

He is a celebrity endorser of Aficionado Germany Perfume with his own product Jason EDT (Eau de Toilette). He was relaunched as endorser on January 8, 2011, during the grand "1@11" event at the SM Mall of Asia Concert Grounds attended by 85,000 people.

On October 3, 2017, Abalos transferred to GMA Network and signed an exclusive contract at GMA Artist Center after 13 years as a talent of Star Magic of ABS-CBN.

== Political career ==
His father, Popoy Abalos, is a former board member of the Second District of Nueva Ecija.

In the 2016 elections, Abalos, ran as a Liberal, but failed in his attempt to obtain a membership in the municipal council of Pantabangan, Nueva Ecija.

In the 2022 elections, ran under PDP–Laban to "pursue what [his] father had started", he was elected board member of the province's Second District.

== Personal life ==
In his early years, Abalos studied in his hometown, Pantabangan. He later obtained a bachelor's degree in civil engineering from the Nueva Ecija University of Science and Technology in Cabanatuan City.

His engagement in 2021 with his long-time partner, actress and Binibining Pilipinas 2018 runner-up Vickie Rushton, was revealed in June 2022. They were married in a church wedding ceremony in Batangas on September 1 of the same year. And on September 1, 2023, coinciding with their first wedding anniversary, they had their first child named Knoa Alexander.

== Electoral history ==
Electoral history of Jason Abalos
Year	Office	Party	Votes received				Result
Year	Office	Party	Total	%	P.	Swing	Result
2016	Councilor of Pantabangan	Liberal	4,608	—N/a	10th	—N/a	Lost
2022	Board Member (Nueva Ecija–2nd)	PDP–Laban	139,242	43.15%	1st	—N/a	Won
2025	Board Member (Nueva Ecija–2nd)	NUP	101,971	27.88%	2nd	—N/a	Won

== Filmography ==
=== Film ===
Year	Title	Role
2006	All About Love	Kiko
2006	I Wanna Be Happy	Javy the Gravy
2006	White Lady	Joshua
2006	First Day High	Nathan "Nat-Nat" Matriponio
2007	Endo	Leo
2007	My Kuya's Wedding	Aristotle
2008	Adela	
2008	Motorcycle	
2011	Rakenrol	Odie
2011	Thelma	Sammy
2013	Death March	Carlito
2014	Somebody to Love	Nicco
2016	Kabisera	
2017	Karyn	Jojo
TBA	Heneral Bantag: Anak ng Cordillera	Gerald Bantag

=== Television / Digital Series ===
Year	Title	Role	Network
2004	Star Circle National Teen Quest	Himself	ABS-CBN
2005–2006	ASAP Fanatic	Himself/co-host (part of SCQ Teens)	ABS-CBN
2005–2006	Vietnam Rose	JR Hernandez	ABS-CBN
2006	Maalaala Mo Kaya: Swing	Benji	ABS-CBN
2006	Maalaala Mo Kaya: Cap	Chako	ABS-CBN
2006	Pilipinas, Game KNB?	Himself (Celebrity Player/Defending Winner)	ABS-CBN
2006	Komiks Presents: Da Adventures of Pedro Penduko	Duwende	ABS-CBN
2006	Love Spell: Home Switch Home	Sylvester	ABS-CBN
2006	Star Magic Presents: Sabihin Mo Lang	Simon	ABS-CBN
2007–2008	Ysabella	Reno	ABS-CBN
2008	Your Song: 241	Glenn	ABS-CBN
2008	Your Song: Muntik Na Kitang Mahal	Eric	ABS-CBN
2008–2011	ASAP	Himself	ABS-CBN
2008	Love Spell: Double		ABS-CBN
2008	Maalaala Mo Kaya: Dollhouse	Marco	ABS-CBN
2008	Maalaala Mo Kaya: Journal	Jonathan	ABS-CBN
2008–2009	Carlo J. Caparas' Pieta	Efren Vargas	ABS-CBN
2008–2009	Eva Fonda	Joel Dakila	ABS-CBN
2009	The Singing Bee	Celebrity Contestant	ABS-CBN
2009	Maalaala Mo Kaya: Pendant	Alex	ABS-CBN
2009	Kambal sa Uma	Dino San Jose	ABS-CBN
2009	May Bukas Pa	Andrew Mercado	ABS-CBN
2009	Agimat: Ang Mga Alamat ni Ramon Revilla presents Tiagong Akyat	Vincent Fajardo	ABS-CBN
2009	Maalaala Mo Kaya: Storybook	TeeJay	ABS-CBN
2009–2010	Nagsimula sa Puso	Jim Ortega	ABS-CBN
2010	Agua Bendita	Paculdo "Paco" Barrameda	ABS-CBN
2010	Your Song: Love Me, Love You	Javier	ABS-CBN
2010–2011	Precious Hearts Romances Presents: Alyna	Dominic Del Carmen	ABS-CBN
2011	Agimat: Ang Mga Alamat ni Ramon Revilla: Bianong Bulag	Biano Santiago / Bianong Bulag	ABS-CBN
2011	It's Showtime	Himself/Judge	ABS-CBN
2011	Maalaala Mo Kaya: Tsinelas	Joe	ABS-CBN
2011	Mara Clara	Cameo Appearance	ABS-CBN
2011	100 Days to Heaven	Brandon Rivera	ABS-CBN
2011–2012	Reputasyon	Boyet Mangubat	ABS-CBN
2012	Precious Hearts Romances Presents: Lumayo Ka Man Sa Akin	Jake Falcon	ABS-CBN
2012	Maalaala Mo Kaya: Gong	Ariel	ABS-CBN
2013	Maalaala Mo Kaya: Letter	Neil	ABS-CBN
2013	Wansapanataym: Gigie In A Bottle	Alvin Cortez	ABS-CBN
2013	Precious Hearts Romances Presents: Paraiso	Daniel	ABS-CBN
2013	Juan dela Cruz	Omar	ABS-CBN
2013–2014	Maria Mercedes	Clavio Mondejar	ABS-CBN
2014	Maalaala Mo Kaya: Bahay	Okoy	ABS-CBN
2014	Pinoy Big Brother: All In	Himself / House guest	ABS-CBN
2014	Hawak-Kamay	Young Philip Agustin	ABS-CBN
2014	Moon of Desire	Ulric	ABS-CBN
2014	Ipaglaban Mo: Akin Lang ang Anak Ko	Nelson	ABS-CBN
2014–2015	Two Wives	Victor Guevarra	ABS-CBN
2015	Bridges of Love	Young Manuel Nakpil	ABS-CBN
2015	Kapamilya, Deal or No Deal	Contestant/Lucky Stars Batch 3 Briefcase #17	ABS-CBN
2016	Ipaglaban Mo: Selos	Igme	ABS-CBN
2016–2017	FPJ's Ang Probinsyano	Alexis	ABS-CBN
2016–2017	Langit Lupa	Joey Garcia	ABS-CBN
2017	Ipaglaban Mo: Rabies	Bong	ABS-CBN
2017	Sunday PinaSaya	Himself / Special Guest	GMA Network
2017	Sarap Diva	Himself / Contestant	GMA Network
2017	All Star Videoke	Himself / Contestant	GMA Network
2017	Tonight with Arnold Clavio	Special guest	GMA Network
2018	Dear Uge: The Throwback or the Future	Charles	GMA Network
2018	The One That Got Away	Gael Harrison Makalintal	GMA Network
2018	Maynila: Utang sa Puso	Harvey	GMA Network
2018	Magpakailanman: Remember My Love	Gerald	GMA Network
2018	Daig Kayo ng Lola Ko: The Runaway Princess Bride	Danny	GMA Network
2018	Pepito Manaloto	The Husband	GMA Network
2018	Inday Will Always Love You	Atty. Russell	GMA Network
2018	Asawa Ko, Karibal Ko	Nathan Bravante	GMA Network
2019	Wish Ko Lang!	Kristoffer King	GMA Network
2019	Bihag	Brylle Alejandro	GMA Network
2020	Anak ni Waray vs. Anak ni Biday	young Joaquin	GMA Network
2021–2022	Las Hermanas	Gabriel Lucero	GMA Network
2023	Love Before Sunrise	Jerson	GMA Network
2024	Lilet Matias: Attorney-at-Law	Bonifacio "Boni" Linao	GMA Network
