= Jose Gay Padiernos =

Filipino politician (born 1963)

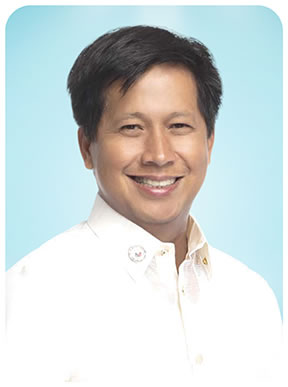
- Official portrait, 2022

Member of the House of Representatives from Galing sa Puso Party
- In office June 30, 2019 – June 30, 2025
- Succeeded by: Jan Rurik Padiernos

Vice Governor of Nueva Ecija
- In office June 30, 2010 – June 30, 2019
- Governor: Aurelio Umali (2010–2016); Czarina Umali (2016–2019)
- Preceded by: Edward Thomas Joson
- Succeeded by: Emmanuel Umali

Personal details
- Born: Jose Gay Garcia Padiernos
- Party: Galing sa Puso (partylist; 2019–present)
- Other political affiliations: Liberal (2012–2019); Lakas (2009–2012); Unang Sigaw (2009–2019)
- Spouse: Janette V. de Leon
- Education: Mapúa Institute of Technology
- Occupation: Politician

Jose Gay Garcia Padiernos, also known as GP Padiernos, is a Filipino politician. He served as representative for Galing sa Puso Party in the House of Representatives of the Philippines from 2019 to 2025. He also served as Vice Governor of Nueva Ecija from 2010 to 2019.

== Political career ==
In 2010 elections, Padiernos was elected as vice governor of Nueva Ecija for three consecutive terms.

In 2019 elections, Padiernos won as first nominee of the Galing sa Puso partylist.

== Personal life ==
Padiernos is married to Janette Valmonte de Leon, a doctor. His son, Jan Rurik Padiernos, is also a representative for Galing sa Puso partylist since 2025.

== Electoral history ==
Electoral history of Jose Gay Padiernos
Year	Office	Party		Votes received				Result
Year	Office	Local	National	Total	%	P.	Swing	Result
2010	Vice Governor of Nueva Ecija	Unang Sigaw	Lakas	458,454	56.8%	1st	—N/a	Won
2013	Vice Governor of Nueva Ecija	Unang Sigaw	Liberal	405,099	—N/a	1st	—N/a	Won
2016	Vice Governor of Nueva Ecija	Unang Sigaw	Liberal	671,949	—N/a	1st	—N/a	Won
2019	Representative (Party-list)	—N/a	GP	249,278	0.90%	35th	—N/a	Won
2022	Representative (Party-list)	—N/a	GP	331,938	0.92%	32nd	—N/a	Won
2025	Representative (Party-list)	—N/a	GP	381,350	0.92%	30th	—N/a	Won one out of three seats
