= Czarina Umali =

Filipino politician and businesswoman (born 1972)

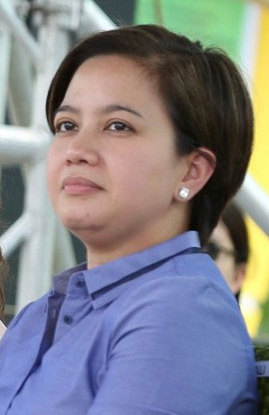
- Umali in 2018

35th Governor of Nueva Ecija
- In office June 30, 2016 – June 30, 2019
- Vice Governor: Jose Gay Padiernos
- Preceded by: Aurelio Umali
- Succeeded by: Aurelio Umali

Member of the House of Representatives from Nueva Ecija’s 3rd district
- In office June 30, 2007 – June 30, 2016
- Preceded by: Aurelio Umali
- Succeeded by: Rosanna Vergara

Personal details
- Born: Czarina Domingo; April 7, 1972 (age 54) Santa Cruz, Manila, Philippines
- Party: Unang Sigaw (2007–present)
- Other political affiliations: Liberal (2010–2019); Lakas (2007–2010)
- Spouse: Aurelio Umali
- Children: 2
- Occupation: Politician, businesswoman

Czarina "Cherry" Domingo Umali (born April 7, 1972) is a Filipino politician and businesswoman. She served as 35th Governor of Nueva Ecija from 2016 to 2019. She served as representative of the 3rd district of Nueva Ecija from 2007 to 2016.

== Political career ==
=== House of Representatives (2007–2016) ===
Umali represented the third district of Nueva Ecija from 2007 to 2016 for three consecutive terms.

=== Governor of Nueva Ecija (2016–2019) ===
Umali became the first woman to be elected as governor of Nueva Ecija from 2016 to 2019, when her husband took over the role.

=== House of Representatives election bids ===
In 2019 elections, Umali ran again as representative of the third district of Nueva Ecija but she lost to Rosanna Vergara.

In 2022 elections, Umali ran again for the second time as representative of the third district of Nueva Ecija but she lost again to Rosanna Vergara.

In 2025 elections, Umali ran again for the third time as representative of the third district of Nueva Ecija but she lost to Jay Vergara.

== Personal life ==
Umali is married to Aurelio Umali and has two daughters.

== Electoral history ==
Electoral history of Czarina Umali
Year	Office	Party		Votes received				Result
Year	Office	Local	National	Total	%	P.	Swing	Result
2007	Representative (Nueva Ecija–3rd)	Unang Sigaw	Lakas	84,484	—N/a	1st	—N/a	Won
2010	Representative (Nueva Ecija–3rd)	Unang Sigaw	Lakas	135,374	62.05%	1st	—N/a	Won
2013	Representative (Nueva Ecija–3rd)	Unang Sigaw	Liberal	123,981	55.10%	1st	—N/a	Won
2019	Representative (Nueva Ecija–3rd)	Unang Sigaw	Liberal	120,674	—N/a	2nd	—N/a	Lost
2022	Representative (Nueva Ecija–3rd)	Unang Sigaw	—N/a	159,922	46.92%	2nd	—N/a	Lost
2025	Representative (Nueva Ecija–3rd)	Unang Sigaw	—N/a	183,912	48.58%	2nd	—N/a	Lost
2016	Governor of Nueva Ecija	Unang Sigaw	Liberal	574,818	—N/a	1st	—N/a	Won

== See also ==
- List of female members of the House of Representatives of the Philippines
