= Governor of Nueva Ecija =

Local chief executive

- Gobernador ng Lalawigan ng Nueva Ecija
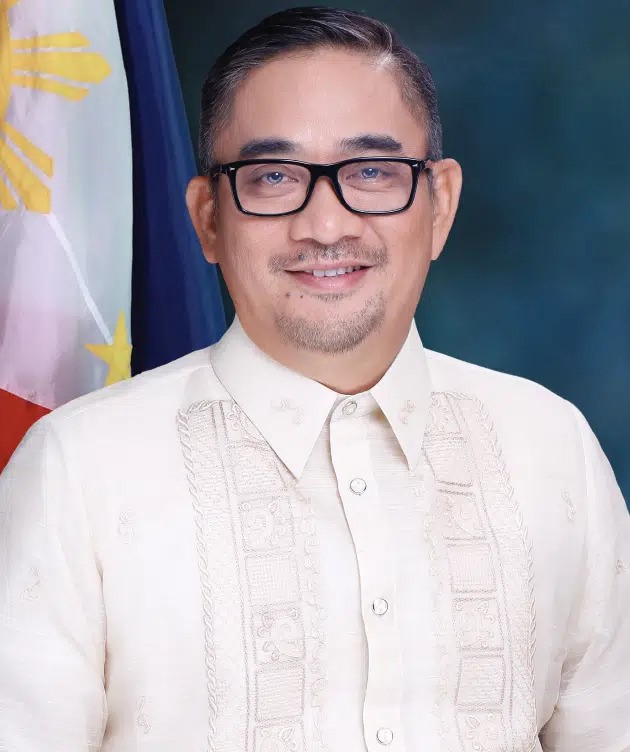
- Incumbent; Aurelio Umali since June 30, 2019
- Style: The Honorable
- Residence: Palayan, Nueva Ecija
- Seat: Nueva Ecija Provincial Capitol
- Term length: 3 years, not eligible for re-election immediately after three consecutive terms
- Inaugural holder: Felino Cajucom
- Formation: 1898

The governor of Nueva Ecija is the local chief executive of the Central Luzon province of Nueva Ecija in the Luzon Island, Philippines.

== List ==
The following are the holders of the position since the post's formal establishment in 1898:

No.	Image	Name	Year/s in office	Notes	Election
1		Felino S. Cajucom	1898 - 1901		
2		Epifanio de los Santos	1902 - 1906	First Filipino elected to the position	
3		Isauro Gabaldon	1906 - 1907		
4		Manuel Tinio	1907 - 1909	Youngest general of the Philippine Revolutionary Army	
5		Lucio Gonzales	1909		
6		Benito Natividad	1910 - 1913		
7		Feliciano Ramoso	1913 - 1916		
8		J. Vicente Salazar	1916 - 1922		
9		Aurelio V. Cecilio	1922 - 1925		
10		Gabriel R. Belmonte	1925 - 1928		
11		Ezequiel Santos	1928 - 1931		
12		Miguel Liuag	1931 - 1934		
13		Jacinto S. Tomacruz	1934 - 1936		
14		Aurelio V. Cecilio	1936 - 1940		
15		Jose G. Robles Jr.	1941 - 1943		
16		Godofredo R. Monsod	1943 - 1944		
17		Alejandro Garcia	1944		
18		Felino E. Villasan Sr.	1944 - 1945		
19		Juan O. Chioco	1945		
20		Herminio E. Algas Sr.	1945 - 1946		
20		Isabelo Castañeda	1946		
21		Mariano A. Sta. Romana	1946		
22		Gabriel R. Belmonte	1946 - 1947		
23		Juan O. Chioco	1948 - 1951		
24		Leopoldo D. Diaz	1952 - 1955		
25		Amado Q. Aleta	1956 - 1959		
26		Eduardo Joson	1960 - 1986	Captain of Filipino guerrillas during the Japanese occupation of the Philippines	
27		Emmanuel T. Santos	1986 - 1987		
28		Eduardo Joson	1988 - 1990		
29		Narciso S. Nario Sr.	1990 - 1992		
30		Tomas Joson III	1992 - 1995		
31		Eduardo Nonato Joson	1995 - 1998		
32		Oscar C. Tinio	1997		
33		Tomas Joson III	1998 - 2007		
34		Aurelio Umali	2007 - 2016		2007 2010 2013
35		Czarina Umali	2016 - 2019	First woman elected to the position	2016
36		Aurelio Umali	2019 - present		2019 2022 2025
