= Aurelio Umali =

Filipino lawyer and politician (born 1966)

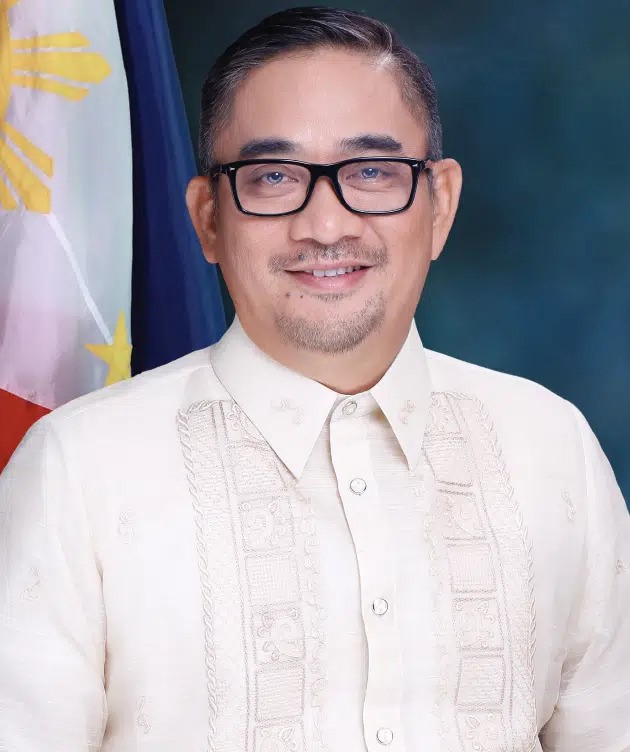
- Official portrait, 2022

34th and 36th Governor of Nueva Ecija
- Incumbent
- Assumed office June 30, 2019
- Vice Governor: Emmanuel Umali (2019–2025); Gil Raymond Umali (2025–present)
- Preceded by: Czarina Umali
- In office June 30, 2007 – June 30, 2016
- Vice Governor: Edward Thomas Joson (2007–2010); Jose Gay Padiernos (2010–2016)
- Preceded by: Tomas Joson III
- Succeeded by: Czarina Umali

Member of the Philippine House of Representatives from Nueva Ecija's 3rd congressional district
- In office June 30, 2001 – June 30, 2007
- Preceded by: Pacifico Fajardo
- Succeeded by: Czarina Umali

Personal details
- Born: Aurelio Matias Umali; January 25, 1966 (age 60) Santa Rosa, Nueva Ecija, Philippines
- Party: Lakas (2004–2007; 2009–2012; 2023–present); Unang Sigaw (local party; 2007–present)
- Other political affiliations: Independent (2016–2023); Liberal (2007–2009; 2012–2016); LDP (2001–2004)
- Spouse: Czarina Umali
- Children: 2
- Education: University of Santo Tomas (BA); San Beda College (LLB); De La Salle University (MBA)
- Occupation: Politician, lawyer

Aurelio "Oyie" Matias Umali (born January 25, 1966) is a Filipino lawyer and politician. Umali is the youngest elected governor in the province since his first government office position. He currently serves as a Governor of Nueva Ecija. He was a governor for three terms from 2007 to 2016 and was re-elected in 2019. He served as representative from the third district of Nueva Ecija from 2001 to 2007.

== Early life and education ==
Aurelio Umali was born in Cabanatuan, Nueva Ecija, on January 25, 1966. In 1990 he finished Bachelor of Laws degree at San Beda College in Manila. He also graduated in De La Salle University with a degree in business administration and Bachelor of Arts in political science at the University of Santo Tomas.

== Political career ==
Prior to his entry in politics in 2001, Umali served as Deputy Commissioner of the National Telecommunications Commission. Prior to that he was Procurement and Sub-Contract Director of Lucent Technologies. He entered politics as Congressman of Nueva Ecija's 3rd District by defeating Edward Thomas Joson and later on elected as governor in 2007 after defeating another Joson. After his term as governor, he was succeeded by his wife Czarina Domingo-Umali for one term. He had his attempt to come back as a Congressman of the province's 3rd district but lost to neophyte politician Rosanna "Ria" Vergara. Umali successfully returned to government after being elected again as provincial governor in the 2019 mid-term elections despite a dismissal and disqualification order from the Office of the Ombudsman.

== Legal issues ==
In 2016, Ombudsman Conchita Carpio-Morales found Umali guilty on four counts of graft and three counts of malversation for the alleged misuse of his PDAF in 2005. Umali's P15-million PDAF was meant to buy irrigation pumps and fertilizers for his constituents in Laur, Gabaldon, Bongabon, Santa Rosa, General Mamerto Natividad, and Cabanatuan. To do this, Umali downloaded millions to his NGO partners – P12 million ($240,975) to the Masaganang Ani para sa Magsasaka Foundation Incorporated (MAMFI) and P3 million ($60,244) to Samahan. Umali made it appear that the funds were used to purchase 7,920 bottles of liquid fertilizers and 15 irrigation pumps however, there was no real purchase at all since the liquid fertilizers had been sourced from another company of Janet Lim-Napoles, Nutrigrowth Philippines. Umali was then dismissed and bared on holding any public office. In 2020, the case against him were dismissed by the Sandiganbayan Second Division due to the violation of his right to speedy disposition of cases.

In 2024, the office of Ombudsman Samuel Martires in a five-page Order dated May 10, directed the six months preventive suspension without pay of Umali. It also directed DILG Secretary Benhur Abalos to implement the “immediately executory” suspension, which originated from a complaint of Roberto Duldulao regarding the alleged issuance of 205 permits for sand and gravel extraction to illegal quarries in Nueva Ecija in violation of Republic Act 7942 or the Philippine Mining Act. His wife, former Governor Czarina Umali and Provincial Environment and Natural Resources Office officer Wilfredo Pangilinan were also named as defendants for violation of R.A. 3019, the Anti-Graft statute. Umali filed a Certiorari Petition with the Court of Appeals of the Philippiness 11th Division. The Court subsequently granted his appeal for a 60-day temporary restraining order on 22 May, hours after the suspension was served.

On August 16, 2025, the Ombudsman imposed a one-year suspension on Umali as governor for issuing quarry permits without clearance from the Department of Environment and Natural Resources.

== Personal life ==
Umali is married to Czarina Umali, who has also served as governor of Nueva Ecija and representative of its third district. His younger brother, Emmanuel Antonio Umali, has also served as a member of the Nueva Ecija Provincial Board and became vice mayor of Cabanatuan and later provincial vice governor.

Furthermore, Umali passed the Philippine Bar Exam and is a lawyer since 1992.

Political offices
Preceded by Czarina Umali	Governor of Nueva Ecija; 2019–present	Incumbent
Preceded by Tomas Joson III	Governor of Nueva Ecija; 2007–2016	Succeeded by Czarina Umali
House of Representatives of the Philippines
Preceded by Pacifico Fajardo	Member of the House of Representatives from Nueva Ecija's 3rd district 2001–2007	Succeeded by Czarina Umali
