= Nueva Ecija Provincial Board =

Legislative body of the province of Nueva Ecija, Philippines

Nueva Ecija Provincial Board Sangguniang Panlalawigan ng Nueva Ecija

Type
- Type: Unicameral
- Term limits: 3 terms (9 years)

Leadership
- Presiding Officer: Gil Raymond M. Umali (Unang Sigaw) since June 30, 2025

Structure
- Seats: 14 board members 1 ex officio presiding officer
- Political groups: Unang Sigaw (7) NUP (1) PFP (1) Lakas-CMD (1) TBD (1) Nonpartisan (3)
- Length of term: 3 years
- Authority: Local Government Code of the Philippines

Elections
- Voting system: Multiple non-transferable vote (regular members); Indirect election (ex officio members); Acclamation (sectoral member)
- Last election: May 12, 2025
- Next election: May 15, 2028

Meeting place
- Nueva Ecija Provincial Capitol, Palayan

The Nueva Ecija Provincial Board is the Sangguniang Panlalawigan (provincial legislature) of the Philippine province of Nueva Ecija.

The members are elected via plurality-at-large voting: the province is divided into four districts, the first and fourth districts sending three members each, while the second and third districts sending two members each to the provincial board; the number of candidates the electorate votes for and the number of winning candidates depends on the number of members their district sends. The vice governor is the ex officio presiding officer, and only votes to break ties. The vice governor is elected via the plurality voting system province-wide.

The districts used in appropriation of members is coextensive with the legislative districts of Nueva Ecija.

Aside from the regular members, the board also includes the provincial federation presidents of the Liga ng mga Barangay (ABC, from its old name "Association of Barangay Captains"), the Sangguniang Kabataan (SK, youth councils) and the Philippine Councilors League (PCL). Nueva Ecija's provincial board also has a reserved seat for its indigenous people (IPMR).

== Apportionment ==
Elections	Seats per district				Ex officio seats	Reserved seats	Total seats
Elections	1st	2nd	3rd	4th	Ex officio seats	Reserved seats	Total seats
2010–2021	3	2	2	3	3	—	13
2021–present	3	2	2	3	3	1	14

== List of members ==
=== Current members ===
These are the members after the 2025 local elections and 2023 barangay and SK elections:

- Vice Governor: Gil Raymond M. Umali (Unang Sigaw)

Seat	Board member	Party	Start of term	End of term
1st district	Belinda E. Palilio	Unang Sigaw	June 30, 2025	June 30, 2028
1st district	Reichel Ann R. Villanueva	Unang Sigaw	June 30, 2025	June 30, 2028
1st district	Eric Daniel F. Salazar	Unang Sigaw	June 30, 2022	June 30, 2028
2nd district	Ferdinand V. Dysico	Unang Sigaw	June 30, 2022	June 30, 2028
2nd district	Jason Abalos	NUP	June 30, 2022	June 30, 2028
3rd district	Eduardo Jose B. Joson VII	PFP	June 30, 2022	June 30, 2028
3rd district	Prudencio B. Garcia Jr.	PFP	June 30, 2025	June 30, 2028
4th district	Inocencio T. Bautista Jr.	Lakas-CMD	June 30, 2025	June 30, 2028
4th district	Ray B. Padiernos Jr.	Unang Sigaw	June 30, 2025	June 30, 2028
4th district	Mary Sweet Liberty N. Cruz	Unang Sigaw	June 30, 2022	June 30, 2028
ABC	Sonny J. Cariño	Nonpartisan	January 18, 2024	January 1, 2026
PCL	Lance A. Santos	Independent	September 1, 2025	June 30, 2028
SK	Sweet Cruz	Nonpartisan	November 26, 2023	January 1, 2026
IPMR	Dante C. Wagayen, Jr.	Nonpartisan	February 24, 2025	February 24, 2028

*Died in office

=== Vice Governor ===
Election year	Name	Party	Ref.
2016	Jose Gay G. Padiernos	Liberal	
2019	Emmanuel Antonio M. Umali	Sigaw	
2022	Emmanuel Antonio M. Umali	Sigaw	
2025	Gil Raymond M. Umali	Sigaw	

=== 1st District ===
- Municipalities: Aliaga, Cuyapo, Guimba, Licab, Nampicuan, Quezon, Santo Domingo, Talavera, Zaragoza
- Population (2024):

Election year	Member (party)	Member (party)	Member (party)	Ref.
2016	Belinda E. Palilio (Liberal)	Rommel Padilla (BALANE)	Rafael Andrew R. Villanueva (UNA)	
2019	Roseller de Guzman (Sigaw)	Eric Daniel F. Salazar (Sigaw)	Rafael Andrew R. Villanueva (Sigaw)	
2022	Roseller de Guzman (Sigaw)	Eric Daniel F. Salazar (Sigaw)	Rafael Andrew R. Villanueva (Sigaw)	
2025	Belinda E. Palilio (Sigaw)	Eric Daniel F. Salazar (Sigaw)	Reichel Ann R. Villanueva (Sigaw)	

=== 2nd District ===
- Cities: Muñoz, San Jose
- Municipalities: Carranglan, Llanera, Lupao, Pantabangan, Rizal, Talugtug
- Population (2024):

Election year	Member (party)	Member (party)	Ref.
2016	Edgardo F. Agliam (Liberal)	Mario C. Ortiz (Liberal)	
2019	Esmeraldo B. Abalos (Independent)	Joseph R. Ortiz (Sigaw)	
2022	Jason Abalos (PDP–Laban)	Ferdinand V. Dysico (Sigaw)	
2025	Jason Abalos (NUP)	Ferdinand V. Dysico (Sigaw)	

=== 3rd District ===
- Cities: Palayan
- Municipalities: Bongabon, Gabaldon, General Mamerto Natividad, Laur, Rosa
- Population (2024):

Election year	Member (party)	Member (party)	Ref.
2016	Edward Thomas F. Joson (UNA)	Jo-Mario Angelo E. Matias (NPC)	
2019	Eduardo Jose F. Joson, VII (PDP–Laban)	Jo-Mario Angelo E. Matias (PDP–Laban)	
2022	Eduardo Jose F. Joson, VII (PDP–Laban)	Jo-Mario Angelo E. Matias (PDP–Laban)	
2025	Eduardo Jose F. Joson, VII (PFP)	Prudencio B. Garcia, Jr. (PFP)	

=== 4th District ===
- Cities: Gapan
- Municipalities: Cabiao, General Tinio, Jaen, Peñaranda, San Antonio, San Isidro and San Leonardo
- Population (2024):

Election year	Member (party)	Member (party)	Member (party)	Ref.
2016	Froilan C. Nagaño, Jr. (UNA)	Napoleon P. Interior, Jr. (Liberal)	John Carlo C. Patiag (Liberal)	
2019	Napoleon P. Interior, Jr. (Sigaw)	Emary Joy D. Pascual (NUP)	Teresita A. Patiag (Sigaw)	
2022	Napoleon P. Interior, Jr. (Sigaw)	Mary Sweet Liberty N. Cruz (Sigaw)	Teresita A. Patiag (Sigaw)	
2025	Inocencio T. Bautista, Jr. (Lakas)	Mary Sweet Liberty N. Cruz (Sigaw)	Rey P. Padiernos, Jr. (Sigaw)	
