= Mamerto =

Mamerto is both a surname and a given name. Notable people with the name include:

- Claudio Mamerto Cuenca (1812–1852), Argentine poet and physician
- Mamerto Esquiú (1826–1883), Argentine Roman Catholic Bishop of Córdoba
- José Mamerto Gómez Hermosilla (1771–1837), Spanish Hellenist, journalist and writer
- Mamerto Menapace (1942–2025), Argentine Roman Catholic monk and writer
- Mamerto Natividad (1871–1897), Filipino military leader during the Philippine Revolution against the Spaniards
- Fabio Mamerto Rivas Santos (1932–2018), Dominican Roman Catholic prelate
- Mamerto Urriolagoitía (1895–1974), President of Bolivia from 1949 to 1951

== See also ==
- Fray Mamerto Esquiú Department, department of Catamarca Province in Argentina
- General Mamerto Natividad, Nueva Ecija, 4th class municipality in the province of Nueva Ecija, Philippines
- San Antonio, Fray Mamerto Esquiú, municipality in Catamarca Province in northwestern Argentina
- San José de Fray Mamerto Esquiú, town in Catamarca Province, Argentina
