= Fray Mamerto Esquiú Department =

Fray Mamerto Esquiú Departamento Fray Mamerto Esquiú
- Department
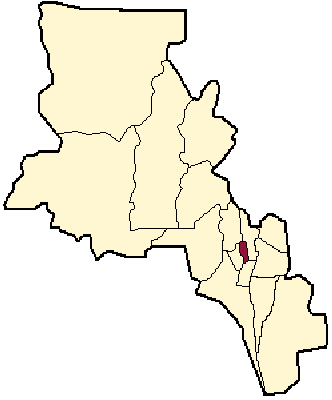
- location of Fray Mamerto Esquiú Department in Catamarca Province
- Coordinates: 28°23′S 65°42′W
- Country: Argentina
- Established: ?
- Founder: ?
- Seat: San José

Government
  - Mayor: Humberto F. Valdez, FCS

Area
  - Total: 280 km^{2} (110 sq mi)

Population (2001 census [INDEC])
  - Total: 10,658
  - Density: 38/km^{2} (99/sq mi)
- Demonym: ?
- Postal Code: ?
- IFAM: CAT010
- Area Code: 03833
- Patron saint: ?
- Website: web.archive.org/web/20080414172243/http://www.camsencat.gov.ar/fmesquiu.html

Fray Mamerto Esquiú is a department of Catamarca Province in Argentina. This provincial subdivision has a population of about 11,000 inhabitants in an area of 280 km^{2} (110 sq mi), and its capital city is San José. The department is named after friar Mamerto Esquiú (1826-1883).

== Districts ==
- Agua Colorada
- Capilla del Rosario
- Club Caza y Pesca
- Collagasta
- El Hueco
- Fray Mamerto Esquiú
- La Carrera
- La Falda
- La Tercena
- La Tercera
- Las Pirquitas
- Payahuaico
- Pomancillo Este
- Pomancillo Oeste
- Quebrada El Cura
- San Antonio
- San José
