= Gabaldon, Nueva Ecija =

Municipality in Nueva Ecija, Philippines

Gabaldon Sabani
- Municipality
- Municipality of Gabaldon
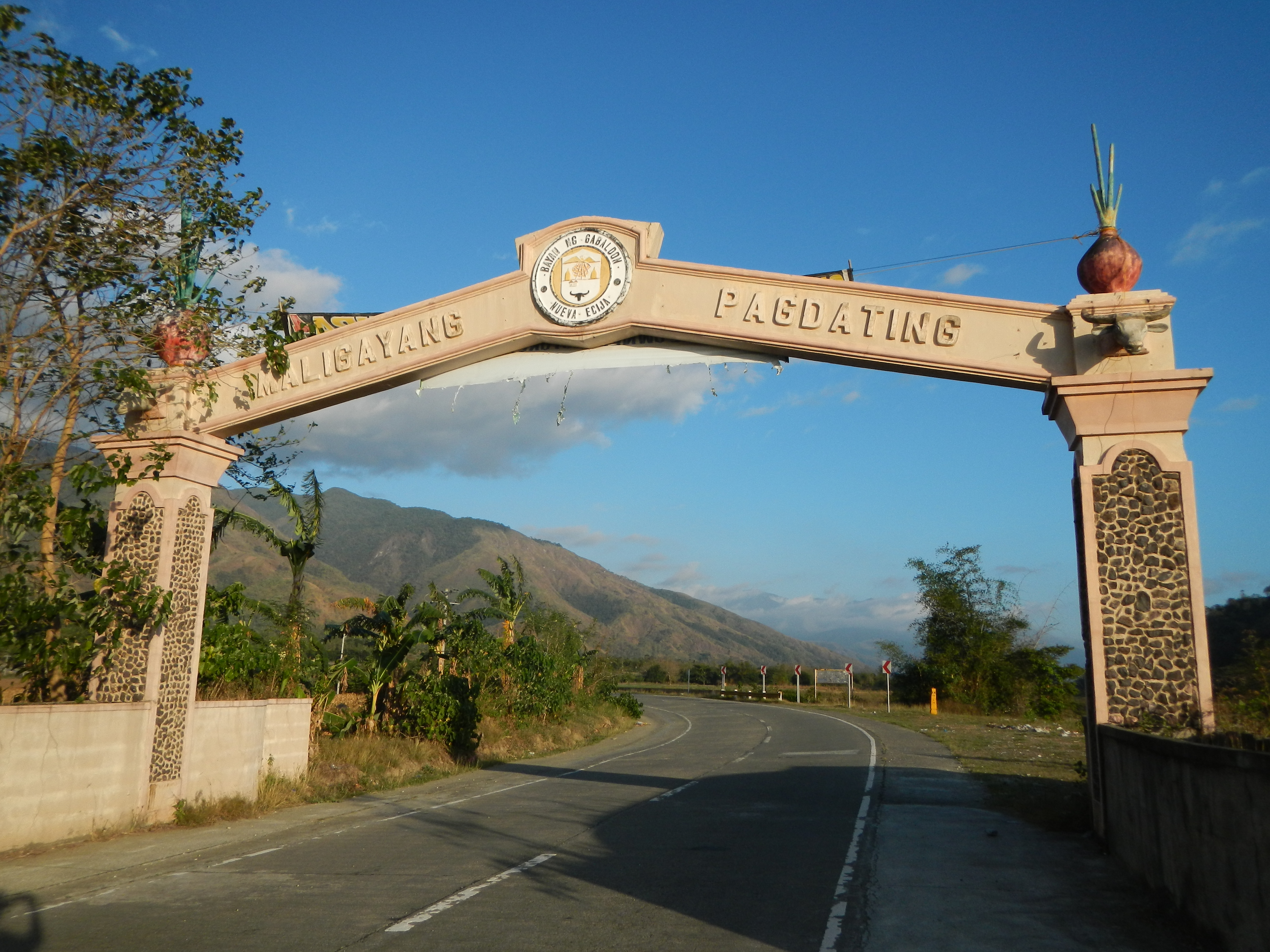
- Welcome Arch

- Seal

- Map of Nueva Ecija with Gabaldon highlighted
- Interactive map of Gabaldon
- Location within the Philippines
- Coordinates: 15°27′02″N 121°20′16″E
- Country: Philippines
- Region: Central Luzon
- Province: Nueva Ecija
- District: 3rd district
- Founded: June 12, 1950
- Renamed: June 20, 1953 (as Sabani); June 16, 1955 (as Gabaldon)
- Named for: Isauro Gabaldón
- Barangays: 16 (see Barangays)

Government
  - Type: Sangguniang Bayan
  - Mayor: Jobby P. Emata
  - Vice Mayor: Victorino V. Sabino
  - Representative: Julius Cesar V. Vergara
  - Municipal Council: Members: Woody John G. Espera; Romnick N. Bue; Mark Jay M. Gedo Cruz; Remedios D. Valdez; Alfredo M. Macasieb; Adelino D. Manabat; Renato C. Valentin; Imelda V. Mandia
  - Electorate: 25,705 voters (2025)

Area
  - Total: 242.88 km^{2} (93.78 sq mi)
- Elevation: 339 m (1,112 ft)
- Highest elevation: 1,389 m (4,557 ft)
- Lowest elevation: 114 m (374 ft)

Population (2024 census)
  - Total: 40,223
  - Density: 165.61/km^{2} (428.92/sq mi)
  - Households: 9,881

Economy
  - Income class: 1st municipal income class
  - Poverty incidence: 14.18% (2023)
  - Revenue: ₱ 265.5 million (2024)
  - Assets: ₱ 744.1 million (2024)
  - Expenditure: ₱ 200.5 million (2024)
  - Liabilities: ₱ 317.8 million (2024)

Service provider
  - Electricity: Nueva Ecija 2 Area 2 Electric Cooperative (NEECO 2 A2)
- Time zone: UTC+8 (PST)
- ZIP code: 3131
- PSGC: 0304907000
- IDD : area code: +63 (0)44
- Native languages: Tagalog; Ilocano
- Website: gabaldon.gov.ph

Gabaldon [ˌɡabɐlˈdon], officially the Municipality of Gabaldon (Tagalog: Bayan ng Gabaldon, Ilocano: Ili ti Gabaldon), is a municipality in the province of Nueva Ecija, Philippines. According to the 2024 census, it has a population of 40,223 people.

== Etymology ==
On June 16, 1955, the town's name was changed from Sabani to Gabaldon in honor of the former Provincial Governor and Philippine Resident Commissioner Isauro Gabaldón.

== History ==
During the latter half of the 19th century, Gabaldon was the site of the Sabani Estate, the largest hacienda in Nueva Ecija, which was then part of Laur. The estate included 3,000 heads of cattle and occupied more than 6,000 hectares. Over time, Ilocano, Pangasinese, Tagalog, and Kapampangan settlers arrived from different places like the neighboring provinces of Tarlac, Pangasinan, and Pampanga.

On May 10, 1920, the national government, through the National Development Company, took over the administration of the estate and developed it for rice production. A group composed of local businessmen leased the estate until 1935, after which it was returned to Sabani Estate Development Company. The government then converted the estate into a homestead.

On June 12, 1950, by virtue of Republic Act No. 496, the barrios of Bitulok, Bantug, Bitulok Saw Mill, Cuyapa, Macasandal, Pantok, Calumpang, Malinao, Tagumpay, Bugnan, Bagong Sicat, Ligaya, Calabasa, Bateria and Pintong Bagting were separated from Laur to constitute the new municipality of Bitulok. Like Laur, barangays that became Bitulok were also part of Bongabon, which in turn were part of Pantabangan.

On June 20, 1953, by virtue of Republic Act No. 949, The municipality's name was changed from Bitulok to Sabani. On June 16, 1955, the municipality's name was changed from Sabani to Gabaldon by virtue of Republic Act No. 1318, to honor former provincial governor and Philippine Resident Commissioner Isauro Gabaldón.

== Geography ==
The municipality is located in the valley situated at the footstep of the Sierra Madre to its east and the Caraballo Mountains to its west. It lies 39 kilometres (24 mi) from Palayan, 169 kilometres (105 mi) from Manila, and 141 kilometres (88 mi) from Baler. Gabaldon is bounded by Bongabon to the north, Laur to the west, General Tinio to the south, and San Luis and Dingalan in Aurora to the east.

=== Barangays ===
Gabaldon is politically subdivided into 16 barangays, as shown below. Each barangay consists of puroks and some have sitios.

- Bagong Sikat
- Bagting
- Bantug
- Bitulok (North Poblacion)
- Bugnan
- Calabasa
- Camachile
- Cuyapa
- Ligaya
- Macasandal
- Malinao
- Pantoc
- Pinamalisan
- South Poblacion
- Sawmill
- Tagumpay

=== Climate ===
Climate data for Gabaldon, Nueva Ecija
| Month | Jan | Feb | Mar | Apr | May | Jun | Jul | Aug | Sep | Oct | Nov | Dec | Year |
|---|---|---|---|---|---|---|---|---|---|---|---|---|---|
| Mean daily maximum °C (°F) | 26 (79) | 27 (81) | 28 (82) | 30 (86) | 30 (86) | 30 (86) | 29 (84) | 29 (84) | 29 (84) | 28 (82) | 27 (81) | 26 (79) | 28 (83) |
| Mean daily minimum °C (°F) | 19 (66) | 19 (66) | 20 (68) | 22 (72) | 23 (73) | 23 (73) | 23 (73) | 23 (73) | 23 (73) | 22 (72) | 21 (70) | 20 (68) | 22 (71) |
| Average precipitation mm (inches) | 21 (0.8) | 18 (0.7) | 16 (0.6) | 18 (0.7) | 65 (2.6) | 102 (4.0) | 112 (4.4) | 95 (3.7) | 91 (3.6) | 99 (3.9) | 58 (2.3) | 49 (1.9) | 744 (29.2) |
| Average rainy days | 6.8 | 5.2 | 6.1 | 7.1 | 16.1 | 20.2 | 22.6 | 21.6 | 20.9 | 16.0 | 9.0 | 9.3 | 160.9 |
Source: Meteoblue

== Demographics ==
Population census of Gabaldon
| Year | Pop. | ±% p.a. |
|---|---|---|
| 1960 | 9,907 | — |
| 1970 | 13,865 | +3.41% |
| 1975 | 15,673 | +2.49% |
| 1980 | 17,169 | +1.84% |
| 1990 | 21,744 | +2.39% |
| 1995 | 25,750 | +3.22% |
| 2000 | 28,324 | +2.06% |
| 2007 | 29,619 | +0.62% |
| 2010 | 32,246 | +3.14% |
| 2015 | 35,383 | +1.78% |
| 2020 | 38,958 | +2.05% |
| 2024 | 40,223 | +0.77% |
Source: Philippine Statistics Authority

=== Languages ===
Tagalog is the main language in Gabaldon. Kapampangan and Ilocano are also spoken.

== Economy ==
Poverty incidence of Gabaldon (%)

Source: Philippine Statistics Authority

Agriculture is the main economic source of the municipality, with 56% of its land area being used for farming. Rice is the primary crop being cultivated in the municipality's lowland while secondary crops such as onion, corn, garlic, ampalaya, and other crops are cultivated in the uplands. The municipality is one of the top onion producers in the province. Limited livestock, poultry, and fish production are also present.

The municipality has nearly 300 commercial establishments mostly centered along the national road and around the municipal public market. Moreover, there are 6 agri-based industrial establishments within the city, including 5 rice mills and a commercial poultry, and 20 cottage industry establishments.

== Tourism ==
Due to Gabaldon's proximity to the coastal town of Dingalan, Aurora and its scenic location in the valley, there are several ecological tourist spots found in the municipality, including the Dupinga Water Reservoir, the Sierra Madre, Cabangcalan Lake, and multiple waterfalls dotting the southeastern part of the Sierra Madre. Numerous resorts are in the municipality, including the Ecopark located inside the Gabaldon campus of the Nueva Ecija University of Science and Technology.

== Education ==
The Gabaldon Schools District Office governs all educational institutions within the municipality. It oversees the management and operations of all private and public, from primary to secondary schools.

=== Primary and elementary schools ===
- Bagting Elementary School
- Bantug Elementary School
- Bateria Elementary School
- Bugnan Elementary School
- Calabasa Elementary School
- Camatchile Elementary School
- Cuyapa Elementary School
- Dupinga Elementary School
- F. Buencamino Sr. Elementary School
- Gabaldon Central School
- Gabaldon Essential Academy
- Gabaldon South Elementary School
- Gawad Kalinga Elementary School
- Ligaya Elementary School
- Mabaldog Elementary School
- Malinao Elementary School
- Pagsangjan Elementary School
- Pantoc Elementary School
- Pindangan Indigenous Peoples Elementary School
- Pinamalisan Elementary School
- St. Paul the Apostle School
- Tagumpay Elementary School

=== Secondary schools ===
- Bagting National High School
- Bagong Sikat Integrated School
- F. Buencamino Sr. Integrated School
- Gabaldon Vocational Agricultural High School
- Ligaya National High School

=== Higher educational institution ===
- Nueva Ecija University of Science and Technology

== See also ==
- List of renamed cities and municipalities in the Philippines
