= Santa Rosa, Nueva Ecija =

Municipality in Nueva Ecija, Philippines

Santa Rosa
- Municipality
- Municipality of Santa Rosa
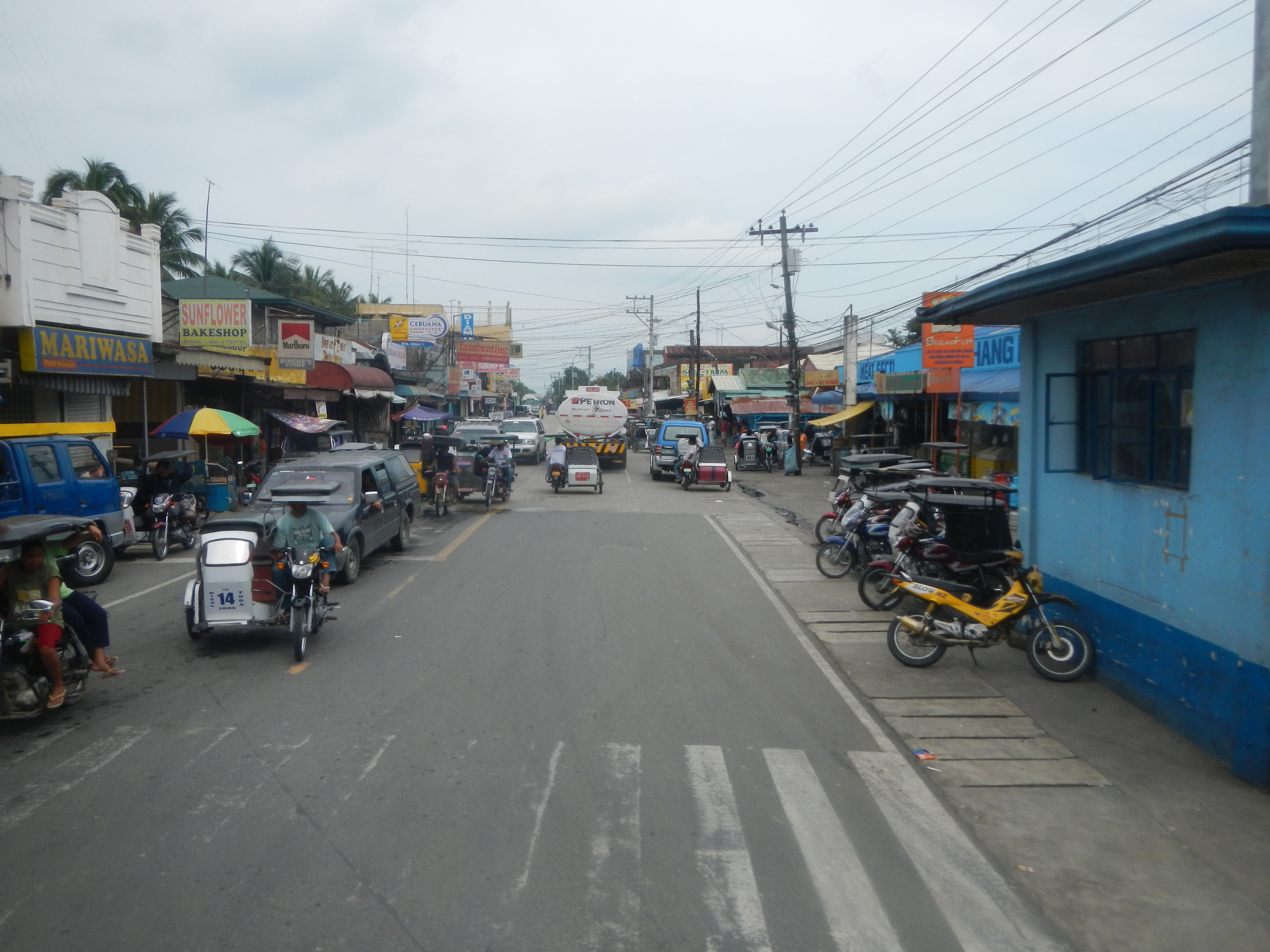
- Downtown

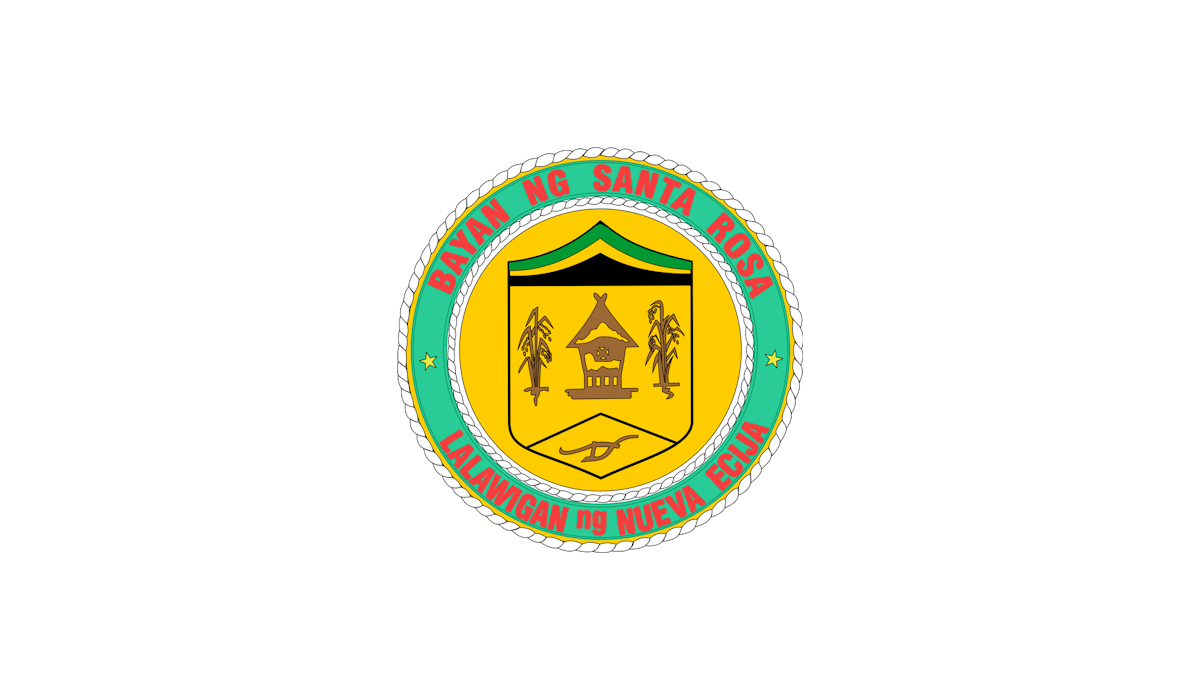
- Flag Seal

- Map of Nueva Ecija with Santa Rosa highlighted
- Interactive map of Santa Rosa
- Location within the Philippines
- Coordinates: 15°25′26″N 120°56′20″E
- Country: Philippines
- Region: Central Luzon
- Province: Nueva Ecija
- District: 3rd district
- Founded: August 1, 1878
- Annexation to Cabanatuan: October 8, 1903
- Chartered: August 7, 1907
- Named for: St. Rose of Lima
- Barangays: 33 (see Barangays)

Government
  - Type: Sangguniang Bayan
  - Mayor: Christopher Flores Aguilar
  - Vice Mayor: Richard D. Dimacali
  - Representative: Julius Cesar V. Vergara
  - Municipal Council: Members: Ma.Cerissa Angeles; Irene S. Bernardo; Ramil Sumera; Dennis D. Dimacali; Glenn B. Santos; Ardee Santiago; Claudine Baldazo; Antonio Romero; SK Federal President Vera Liane Gabriel
  - Electorate: 54,240 voters (2025)

Area
  - Total: 147.15 km^{2} (56.81 sq mi)
- Elevation: 28 m (92 ft)

Population (2024 census)
  - Total: 80,258
  - Density: 545.42/km^{2} (1,412.6/sq mi)
  - Households: 18,801

Economy
  - Income class: 1st municipal income class
  - Poverty incidence: 13.25% (2015)
  - Revenue: ₱ 341.8 million (2024)
  - Assets: ₱ 1,101 million (2024)
  - Expenditure: ₱ 319.6 million (2024)
  - Liabilities: ₱ 243.7 million (2024)

Service provider
  - Electricity: Nueva Ecija 2 Area 2 Electric Cooperative (NEECO 2 A2)
- Time zone: UTC+8 (PST)
- ZIP code: 3101
- PSGC: 0304928000
- IDD : area code: +63 (0)44
- Native languages: Tagalog; Ilocano

Santa Rosa, officially the Municipality of Santa Rosa (Tagalog: Bayan ng Santa Rosa) is a municipality in the province of Nueva Ecija, Philippines. According to the 2024 census, it has a population of 80,258 people.

== History ==
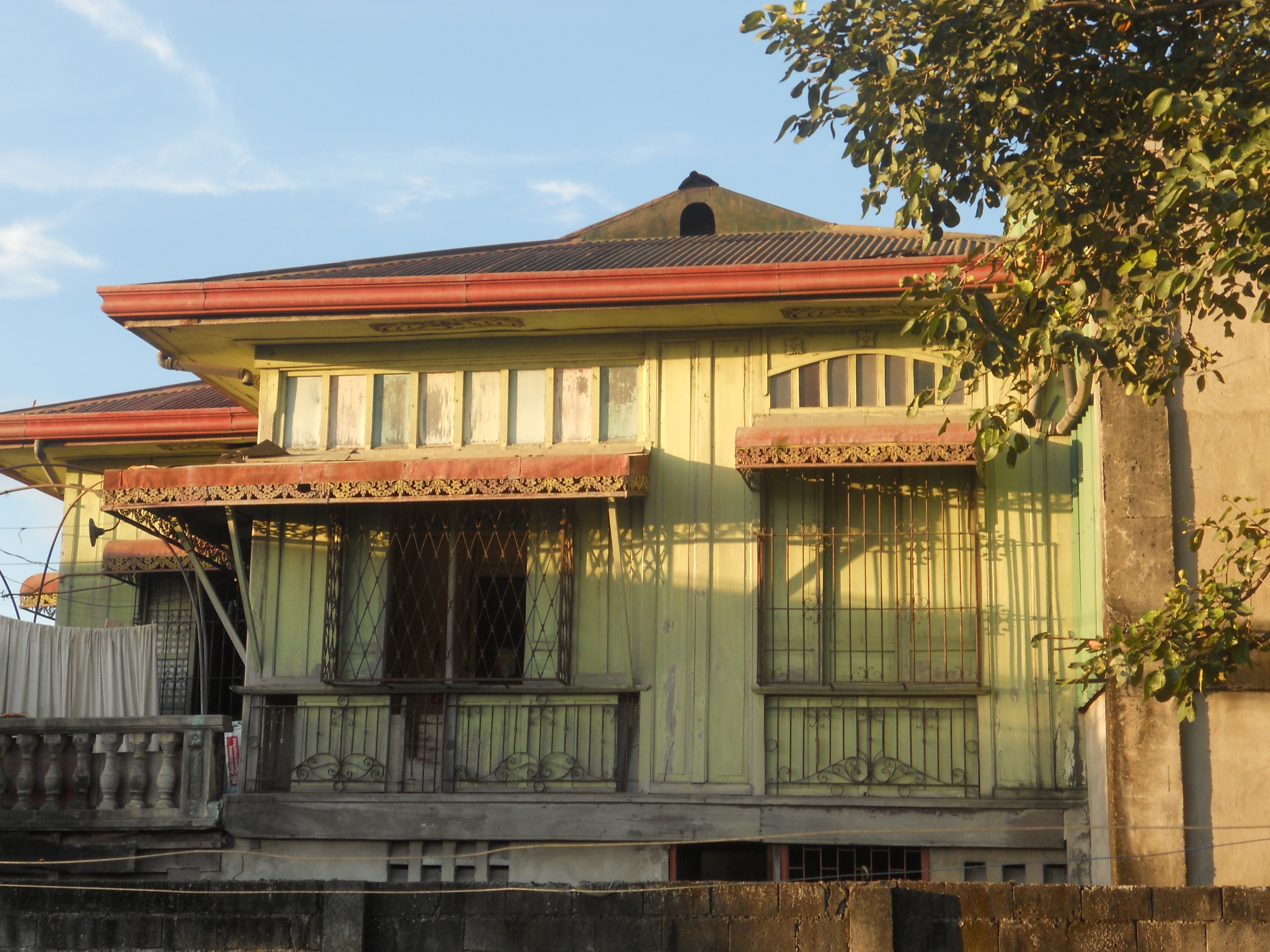
An ancestral house in the poblacion area

According to the National Historical Commission of the Philippines, Santa Rosa was founded on August 1, 1878 through a Spanish decree. In his letter dated March 9, 2017, NHCP OIC-Chairman Rene Escalante said the Spanish decree was retrieved from the Archivo Historico Nacional in Madrid, Spain and is entitled "Creacion de un pueblo civil formado por al barrio de Santa Rosa en la provincia de Nueva Ecija".

In his book, Nueva Ecija: 1896–1946, Cesar Baroman wrote that Santa Rosa was a mere visita of Cabanatuan at the time when the latter was still a barrio of Gapan.

During the American occupation, the Philippine Commission enacted Act No. 933 on October 8, 1903, merging Santa Rosa with Cabanatuan. On August 17, 1907, Santa Rosa was later separated from Cabanatuan and regained its municipal status by virtue of Act No. 1687.

== Geography ==
Santa Rosa is bounded by Cabanatuan to the north, Laur to the east, General Tinio to the south-east, Peñaranda and San Leonardo to the South, Jaen to the south-west, and Zaragoza to the west. The Pampanga River traverses near the center of the municipality.

Santa Rosa is 23 kilometers (14 mi) from the provincial capital Palayan, and 107 kilometers (66 mi) from the country's capital city of Manila.

=== Barangays ===
Santa Rosa is politically subdivided into 33 barangays. Each barangay consists of seven puroks and some have sitios.

The Barangay Captain/Chairman heads the Barangay Government, assisted by the Barangay Kagawads (Councilors). There is also a Barangay Secretary, Barangay Treasurer, Hepe ng Tanod (Chief), Barangay Tanods, Barangay Health Workers and BNS, Day Care Worker in every barangay. There is a chapter of the Liga ng Barangay at Santa Rosa, as well as SK Federation President. The BHWs and Day Care Workers have an organization at the municipal-level.

- Cojuangco (Poblacion)
- La Fuente
- Liwayway
- Malacañang
- Maliolio
- Mapalad
- Rizal (Poblacion)
- Rajal Centro
- Rajal Norte
- Rajal Sur
- San Gregorio
- San Mariano
- San Pedro
- Santo Rosario
- Soledad
- Valenzuela (Poblacion)
- Zamora (Poblacion)
- Aguinaldo
- Berang
- Burgos
- Del Pilar
- Gomez
- Inspector
- Isla
- Lourdes
- Luna
- Mabini
- San Isidro
- San Joseph
- Santa Teresita
- Sapsap
- Tagpos
- Tramo

Originally, Santa Rosa had 3 barangays or barrios during the Spanish period: Soledad, La Fuente and Rajal. In 1903, the number of barrios became four with the addition of Poblacion. Later on, the number of barrios increased to 17, namely, Cojuangco, La Fuente, Liwayway, Malacanang, Maliolio, Mapalad, Rizal, Rajal Centro, Rajal Norte, Rajal Sur, San Gregorio, San Mariano, San Pedro, Santo Rosario, Soledad, Valenzuela and Zamora.

During the term of Mayor Juanito Bernardo (1988–1998), the 17 barangays became 33 barangays. Some barangays such as San Gregorio, San Mariano, La Fuente, Santo Rosario and San Pedro were subdivided. San Gregorio, for example, was divided into 5 barangays (Aguinaldo, Burgos, Mabini, Tramo and San Gregorio); San Mariano became four barangays (Del Pilar, Gomez, Luna and San Mariano); La Fuente became 3 barangays (La Fuente, San Joseph and Sapsap); Santo Rosario became two barangays (Inspector and Santo Rosario) and San Pedro became two barangays (San Isidro and San Pedro).

=== Climate ===
Climate data for Santa Rosa, Nueva Ecija
| Month | Jan | Feb | Mar | Apr | May | Jun | Jul | Aug | Sep | Oct | Nov | Dec | Year |
|---|---|---|---|---|---|---|---|---|---|---|---|---|---|
| Mean daily maximum °C (°F) | 28 (82) | 30 (86) | 31 (88) | 33 (91) | 33 (91) | 31 (88) | 30 (86) | 29 (84) | 29 (84) | 30 (86) | 30 (86) | 29 (84) | 30 (86) |
| Mean daily minimum °C (°F) | 20 (68) | 20 (68) | 20 (68) | 22 (72) | 24 (75) | 24 (75) | 24 (75) | 24 (75) | 24 (75) | 23 (73) | 22 (72) | 21 (70) | 22 (72) |
| Average precipitation mm (inches) | 4 (0.2) | 4 (0.2) | 5 (0.2) | 11 (0.4) | 66 (2.6) | 99 (3.9) | 127 (5.0) | 113 (4.4) | 99 (3.9) | 84 (3.3) | 35 (1.4) | 14 (0.6) | 661 (26.1) |
| Average rainy days | 2.2 | 1.9 | 3.2 | 5.3 | 16.1 | 20.8 | 23.5 | 22.8 | 22.2 | 16.5 | 8.9 | 3.5 | 146.9 |
Source: Meteoblue

== Demographics ==
Population census of Santa Rosa

| Year | Pop. | ±% p.a. |
|---|---|---|
| 1903 | 3,253 | — |
| 1918 | 6,915 | +5.16% |
| 1939 | 12,809 | +2.98% |
| 1948 | 11,764 | −0.94% |
| 1960 | 15,989 | +2.59% |
| 1970 | 22,554 | +3.50% |
| 1975 | 25,732 | +2.68% |
| 1980 | 32,424 | +4.73% |

| Year | Pop. | ±% p.a. |
|---|---|---|
| 1990 | 40,439 | +2.23% |
| 1995 | 47,522 | +3.07% |
| 2000 | 51,804 | +1.87% |
| 2007 | 58,762 | +1.75% |
| 2010 | 64,503 | +3.45% |
| 2015 | 69,467 | +1.42% |
| 2020 | 75,649 | +1.81% |
| 2024 | 80,258 | +1.43% |

Source: Philippine Statistics Authority

== Economy ==
Poverty incidence of Santa Rosa (%)

Source: Philippine Statistics Authority

Santa Rosa primarily depends on rice cultivation, vegetable production, commercial fishery, and tricycle sidecar fabrication. Just recently, the town started realizing its development potential.

The town's strategic location at the crossroads of two national highways: the Maharlika Highway and the Tarlac-Santa Rosa-Fort Magsaysay Road is accelerating its commercial and industrial development. It is also inevitably set to benefit from the spillover of Cabanatuan's built-up area.

As a result, Santa Rosa is gradually replacing agriculture with services and agro-industry as the main engines for growth. The stretch of Maharlika Highway is a growing commercial strip of local entrepreneurs competing with national businesses while the eastern part of the town is attracting investments in large commercial farms.

As of 2017, based on Commission on Audit of the Philippines, Santa Rosa economic status was:

- Income – ₱190,671,476.98
- Assets – ₱470,150,569.41
- Liabilities – ₱181,022,725.17
- Allotments – ₱294,983,551.31

Concurrent to Santa Rosa's rapid growth is the buildup of perennially heavy traffic at the approach to the intersection of the national roads. To address the worsening situation, the local government teamed up with the Cabanatuan city government to construct a road that will bypass the town proper. As for Santa Rosa, only further growth is anticipated when Central Luzon Link Expressway and North Luzon East Expressway finally materialize.

== Government ==
=== Local government ===
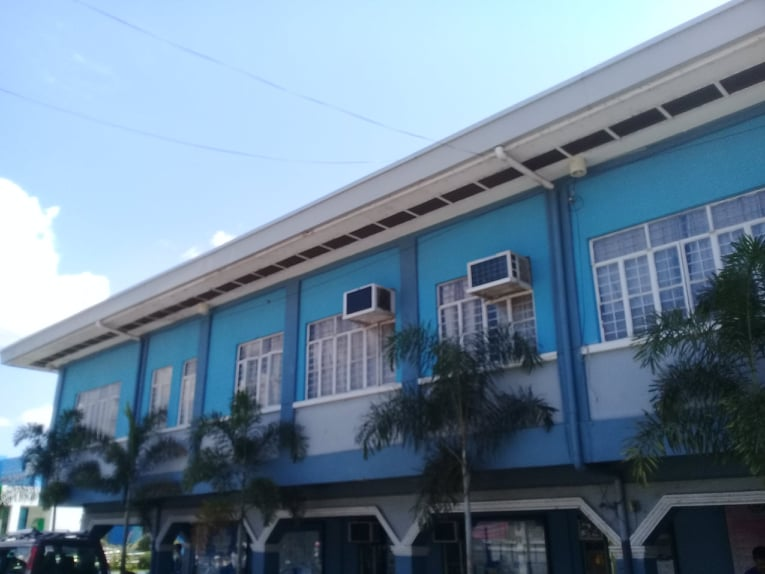
Santa Rosa municipal hall

Pursuant to the Local government in the Philippines, the political seat of the municipal government is located at the Municipal Town Hall. In the History of the Philippines (1521–1898), the Gobernadorcillo was the Chief Executive who holds office in the Presidencia. In 1895, the Spaniards changed the position of Gobernadorcillo to Capitan Municipal. (Local Government in the Philippines, Jose P. Laurel) During the American rule (1898–1946) (History of the Philippines (1898–1946)), the elected Mayor and local officials, including the appointed ones, held office at the Municipal Town Hall.

Under the Local Government Code of 1991 or Republic Act No. 7160, the Mayor acts as the Local Chief Executive and the different departments (Budget, Engineering, Treasury, Accounting, etc.) are under the supervision of the Mayor. The Vice Mayor, on the other hand, is the Presiding Officer of the Sangguniang Bayan/Sangguniang Panlungsod which enacts ordinances or issues Resolutions. The LGC of 1991, primarily authored by former Senator Aquilino Pimentel Jr., gave local autonomy to local government units (LGUs) at the provincial, city/municipal and barangay level. The LGUs were provided with Internal Revenue Allotment (IRA) that gave them a substantial amount of public funds aside from the locally generated funds (real property tax, fees, charges). Functions and services formerly provided by national government agencies such as the Dept. of Agriculture, Dept. of Health, Dept. of Social Welfare and Development were devolved to the provincial and city/municipal LGUs.

During the last National and Local Elections in 2022, the following were elected as local officials of Santa Rosa: Mayor: Josefino Angeles; Vice Mayor: Atty. Ethel Catherine Jean Angeles-Roxas; Municipal Councilors: Ma. Cerissa Angeles, Ardee Santiago, Ramil Sumera, Antonio Romero, Claudine Baldazo, Dennis Dimacali, Irene Bernardo and Glenn Santos. ABC President Marcial Rommel Marcelo and SK Federation President Vera Gabriel are also members of the Sangguniang Bayan.

In 2025 national and local elections, Christopher Tupeng Aguilar, a successful businessman won the Elections with over 6,000 votes ending an 18 term against his opponent Incumbent Mayor Otep Angeles.

==== Previous Mayors and Vice Mayors ====
The previous Mayors of Santa Rosa were the following:

- Eulalio Saulo, 1909–1911
- Dionisio Punsal, 1911–1913
- Rafael Andres, 1917–1919
- Apolinario Manubay, 1919–1921
- Amado del Barrio, 1923–1928
- Matias Beley, 1929–1931
- Casimiro Marcelo, 1932–1939
- Lazaro Cajucom, 1941–1944
- Jacinto Martin, 1945–1947
- Bonifacio Santos, 1948–1951
- Severino Angeles, 1952–1959
  - and in 1964–1971
- Pedro Manubay, 1960–1963
- Cesar Angeles, 1972–1985
- Eduardo Enrile, 1985–1986
- Juanito Bernardo, 1988–1998
- Edgar Matias, July 1998 – December 1998
- Geronimo Baldazo, December 1998 – 2001
- Marlon Marcelo, 2001–2007
- Josefino Manucot Angeles, 2007–2016
- Marita Chua Angeles 2016–2019
- Josefino M. Angeles, 2019–2022
- Josefino M. Angeles, 2022–2025

The following served as Vice Mayors of Santa Rosa:

- Benito Germino, 1952–1959
  - and in 1964–1971
- Marciano Marcelo, 1969–1979
- Eduardo Ennrile, 1972–1985
- Rufino Galman, 1985–1988
- Sesinando Santos, 1988–1992
- Edgar Matias, 1992–1998
- Gerry Baldazo, 1998
- Julian "Jojo" Mendoza, 1998–2001
- Josefino "Otep" Angeles, 2001–2007
- Irene Bernardo, 2007–2013
- Antonio Romero, 2013–2016
- Eliseo Angeles, 2016–2019
- Marie Evangelista, 2019–2022
- Atty. Ethel Catherine Jean Angeles-Roxas, 2022–2025

==== SGLG Awardee ====
The LGU of Santa Rosa is an awardee of the Seal of Good Housekeeping (SGH) in 2011 and Seal of Good Local Governance (SGLG) in 2017, 2018, 2019 and 2022. These two awards are given by the Department of the Interior and Local Government to local government units which practice good governance, transparency and accountability.

== Tourism ==
Santa Rosa's main landmark includes Santa Rosa Supermarket or "Pamilihang Bayan ng Santa Rosa", Santa Rosa Town Hall, Santa Rosa Town Park, Santa Rosa Central School, and St. Rose of Lima Parish Church. Other attractions which are most visited by tourists are The famous and old, round-shaped, miraculous chapel of San Mariano known as "The Miraculous Round Chapel of San Mariano", 18th Century Ancestral Houses in Santa Rosa, a private "Gazebo" of Cruz Compound in San Mariano, 1890 Ancestral House of Brgy. San Gregorio, American Air Base and rivers, Mga Munting Bahay-kubo, and scenic rice fields.

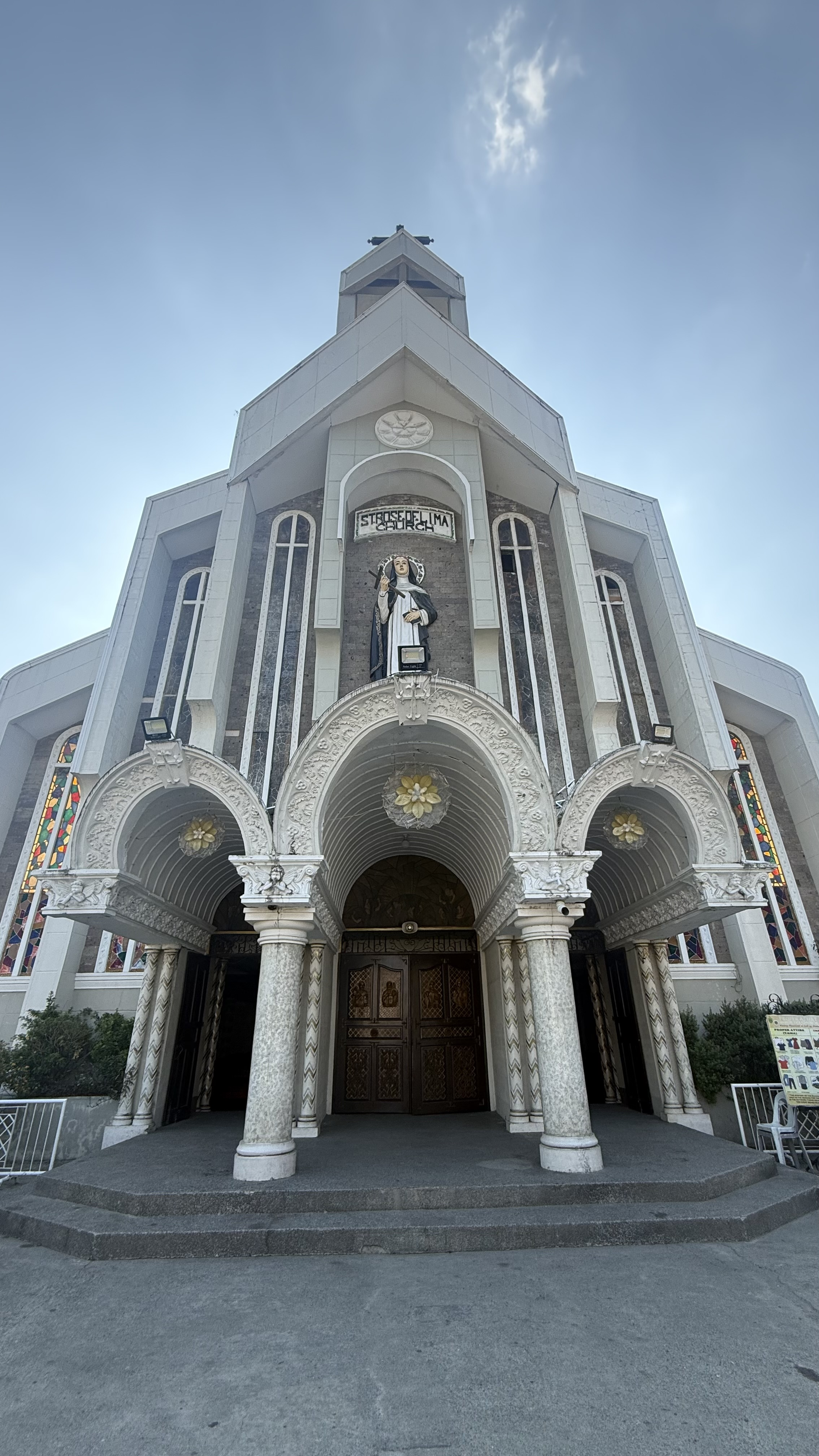
Saint Rose of Lima Parish Church

=== St. Rose of Lima Parish Church ===
The 1879 St. Rose of Lima Parish Church belongs to the Roman Catholic Diocese of Cabanatuan (Dioecesis of Cabanatuanensi, Suffragan of Lingayen-Dagupan, comprising 16 towns of Southern Nueva Ecija, Cabanatuan, Palayan City and Gapan; Titular: St. Nicholas of Tolentine, September 10; Most Reverend Sofronio A. Bancud, SSS, DD). It is named after St. Rose of Lima, T.O.S.D., the first person born in the Americas to be canonized by the Catholic Church.

The Church is located at Maharlika Hway, Poblacion, Santa Rosa, 3101 Nueva Ecija. It is part of the Vicariate of St. Rose of Lima.

=== 1946 Holy Cross College and Chapel ===
The Holy Cross College was founded in 1946 by Rt. Rev. Msgr. Fernando C. Lansangan, parish priest of the town of Santa Rosa, as a secondary school with two first-year classes. In 1948, government recognition was granted to the school for its high school department. In 1981, the expansion of the school's curricular program was conceived. During SY 1982–1983, the MECS granted permit for the first and second year curriculum of the degree Bachelor of Arts and the first and second year curriculum for the Junior Secretarial Course were offered to the public In its 39th year of service to the community.

Dr. Raquel Tioseco Santa Ines, niece of the founder Priest took over the management of the college after his death. In all its 66 years of existence, HCC continues with additional TESDA programs in Restaurant Management, Computer Secretarial, and Electronic and Computer Technology; and six-month courses in Contact Call Center and Medical Transcription. HCC offers Masters in Education major in Mathematics and English.

=== San Mariano Chapel or "The Miraculous Round Chapel of San Mariano" ===
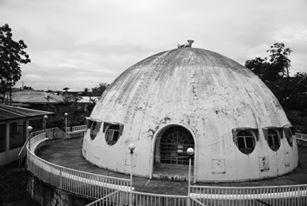
San Mariano Chapel

San Mariano Chapel is a round-shaped chapel located at the core of Barangay San Mariano Santa Rosa, Nueva Ecija. This serves as a landmark of the said Barangay. It was named after the patron saint of the barrio, "San Mariano". The land where it is located was privately owned by a devoted family. After total and complete renovation of the said chapel, the land title was donated to St. Rose of Lima Parish Church.

The Old Miraculous San Mariano Chapel was then reconstructed with the help of a devotee named Antonio M. Romero year 2000 after he recovered from paralysis in 1989. The said devotee religiously attended the mass held at San Mariano Chapel then miraculously recovered from such an illness as stated. He, later on, served as the Vice Mayor of the town and lost in his re-election due to black propaganda. People of San Mariano in the early 1900s used to kneel when passing by the old church including their carabaos or "kalabaw" before farming at dawn as a sign of respect in the said chapel.

The chapel was believed to be miraculous and famous as it was known to be visited by thousands of devotees of the Blessed Virgin Mary and Santo Niño during the 1960s and 1970s. Miracles were actually witnessed by the people who visited the chapel and attended the mass held by the parish priest at that time. Evidence of such miracles were collected and kept by groups of families and people.

The Feast of Santo Niño was celebrated in San Mariano Chapel every 25 February wherein a mass was held and simple gift-giving and feeding for the children were organized by certain groups.

=== 1890 Ancestral House of Brgy. San Gregorio, Santa Rosa ===
An ancestral house built in 1890, this is a landmark known in the whole town of Santa Rosa. Its renovation was initiated in 1974 and finished in 1977. It is built of cement and copper steel. It comprises four balconies, three living room areas, three kitchens, five common bedrooms, and a master bedroom. The living room area had its traditional atmosphere through the marble design floors. During the Spanish era, the chandeliers illuminated the whole house. The majority of its wooden surface was made out of pure narra. The great descendants of Capt. Gregorio drl Barrio (founder of San Gregorio) had meaningful experiences full of love which are worth reminiscing up to the present generation. The house symbolizes a Filipino's resilience for it stood for more than a hundred years overcoming raging calamities like typhoons and earthquakes.

== Education ==
The Santa Rosa Schools District Office governs all educational institutions within the municipality. It oversees the management and operations of all private and public, from primary to secondary schools.

=== Primary and elementary schools ===
- Angel's Ville Elementary School
- Berang Elementary School
- Dr. A. Oliveros Memorial Elementary School
- Dr. Sancho T. Manubay Elementary School
- E. Saulo Memorial Elementary School
- Esing T. Angeles Elementary School
- Eulalio N. Adriano Elementary School
- G. Villegas Memorial School
- Jesus Is Lord Christian School
- La Fuente Elementary School
- Malacañang Centro Elementary School
- Malacañang Elementary School
- Mapalad North Elementary School
- Mapalad Sur Elementary School
- Pepito B. Bernardo Memorial School
- Pilang Elementary School
- Rajal Centro Elementary School
- Rose of Sharon Christian School
- Saint Rose of Lima Catholic School
- San Gregorio Elementary School
- San Pedro Elementary School
- Santa Rosa Central School
- Sapsap Elementary School
- Severa Valisno Memorial Elementary School
- St. Christopher Montessori School of Santa Rosa
- Sto. Rosario Elementary School
- V.F. Villanueva Memorial School

=== Secondary schools ===
- Eusebio G. Asuncion Integrated School
- Luis Gonzales Integrated School
- Malacañang National High School
- NEHS Senior High School
- Santa Rosa Integrated School
- Santa Rosa National High School
- Santo Rosario National High School

=== Higher education institution ===
- The Holy Cross College, Santa Rosa, is a Catholic school established in 1946 and is the legacy of Fernando C. Lansangan (died 1980). Msgr. Lansangan was parish priest of St. Rose of Lima Parish

== Notable people ==
- Raymond Bagatsing – actor
- RK Bagatsing – actor
- Luis "Ka Louie" Diaz Beltran, – Influential journalist and broadcaster, known for Straight from the Shoulder and Brigada Siete. Famously jailed during Martial Law under Ferdinand Marcos, and later sued for libel by President Corazon Aquino.
- Ponciano Bernardo – 2nd mayor of Quezon City

== Gallery ==
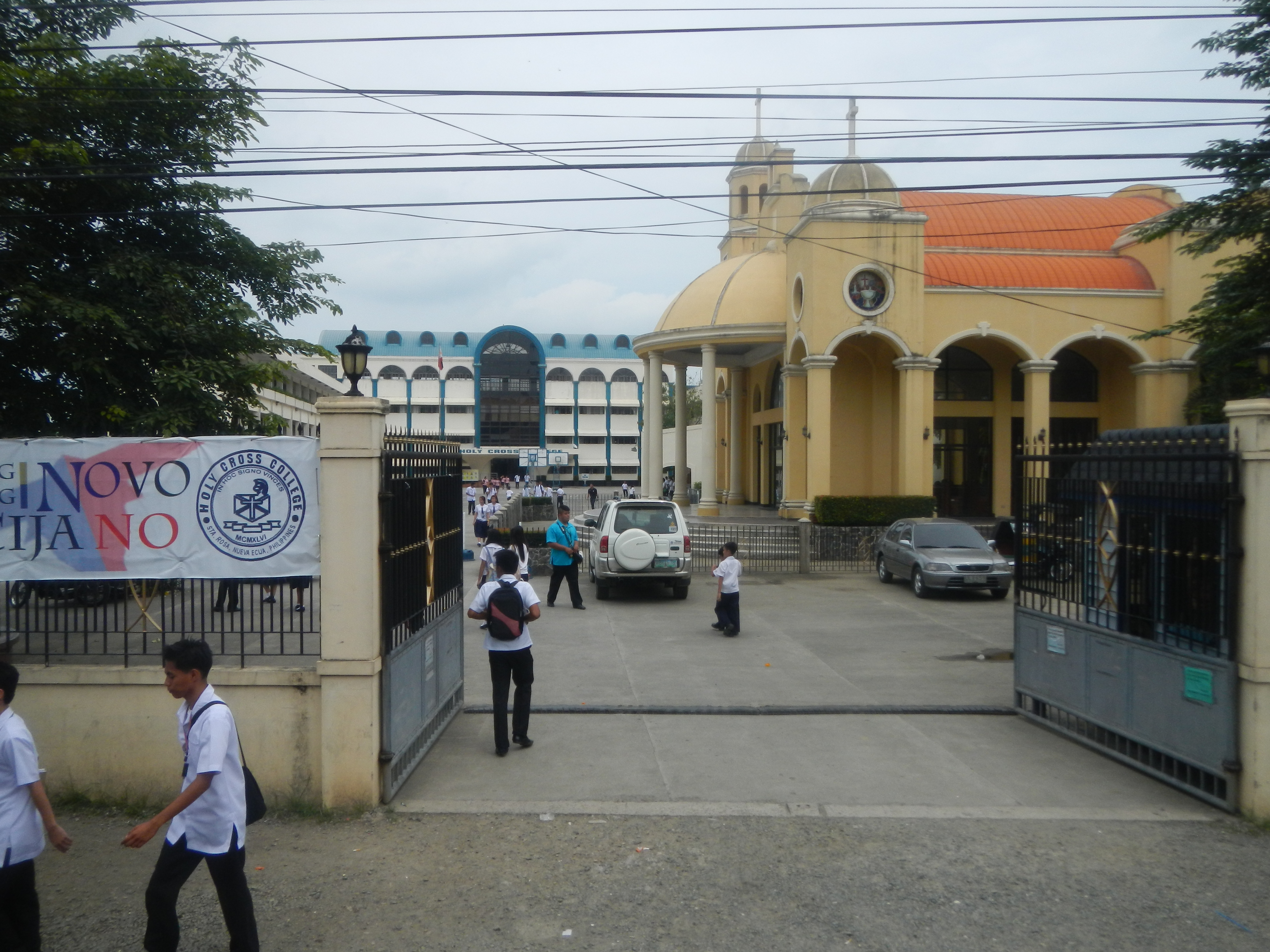
Holy Cross College

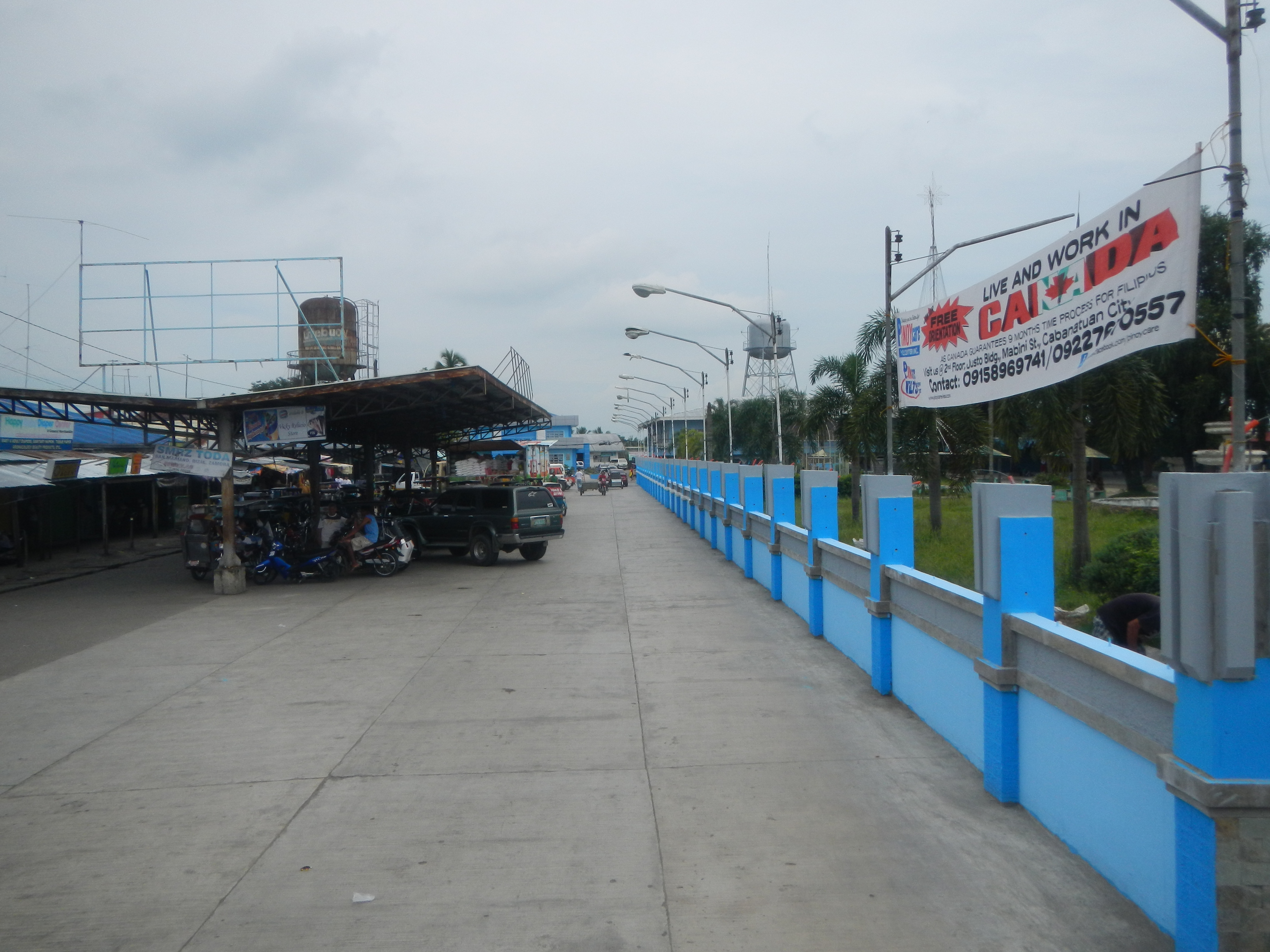
Municipal road and Town hall

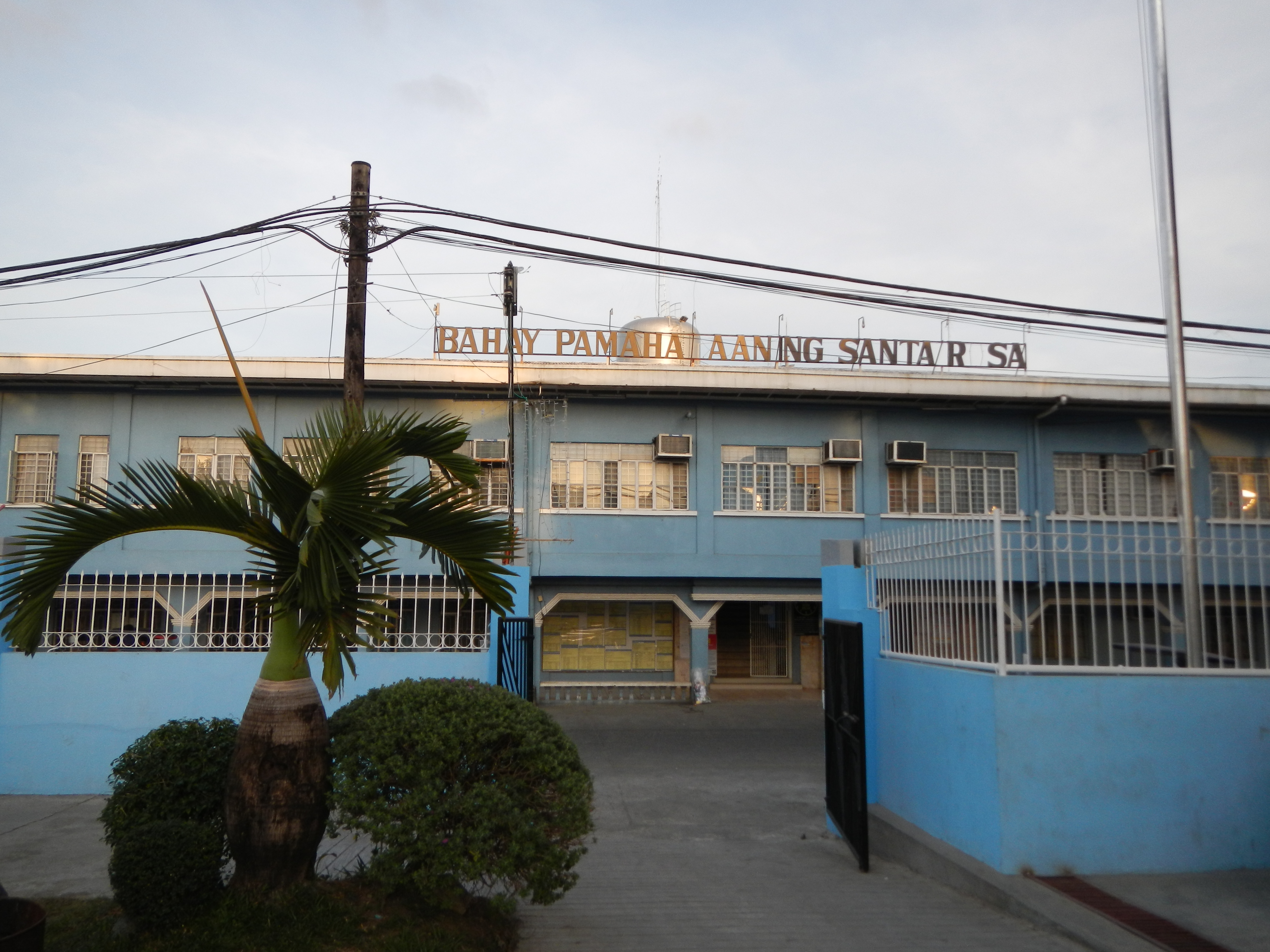
Santa Rosa Town Hall

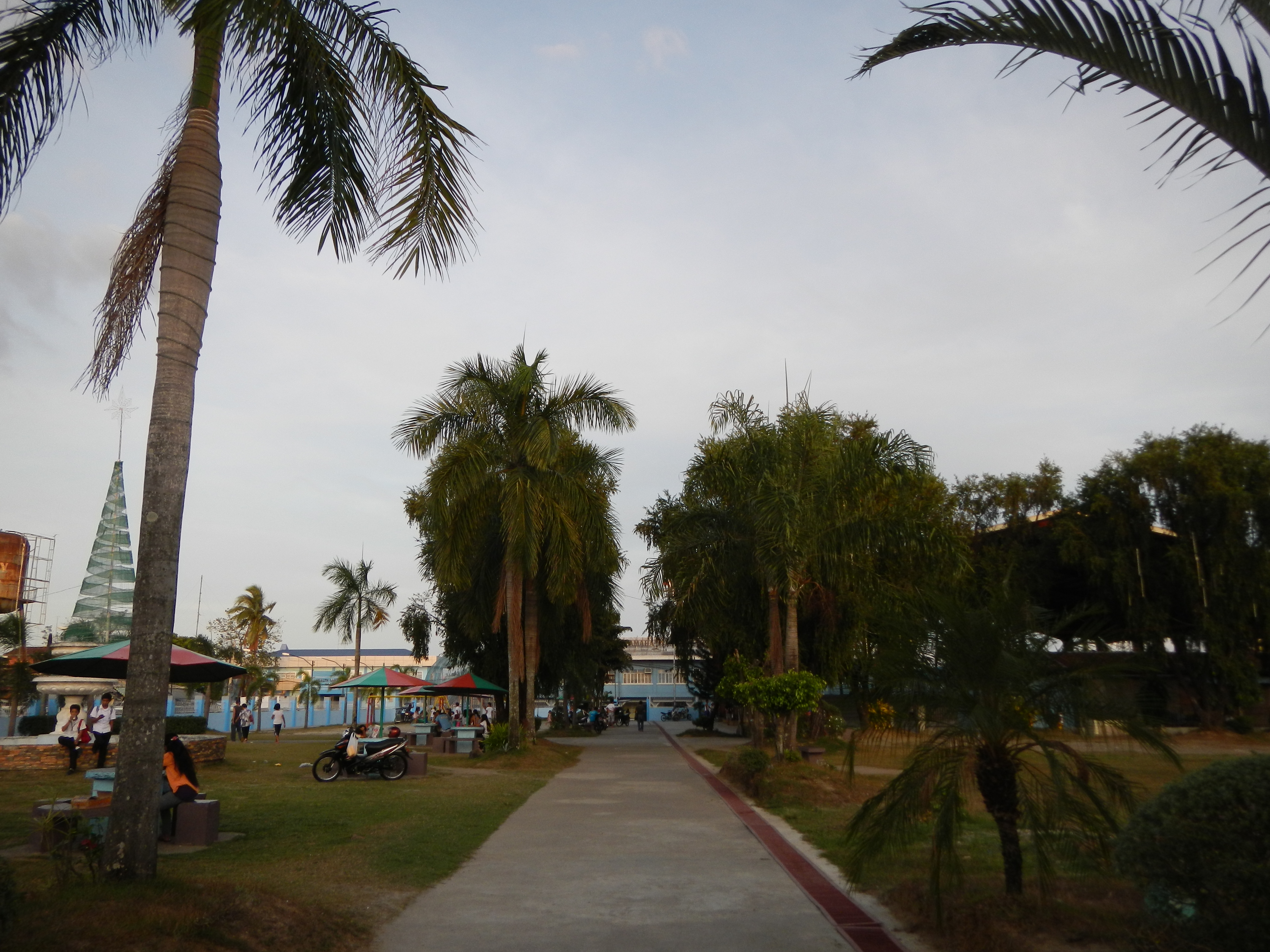
Santa Rosa Park

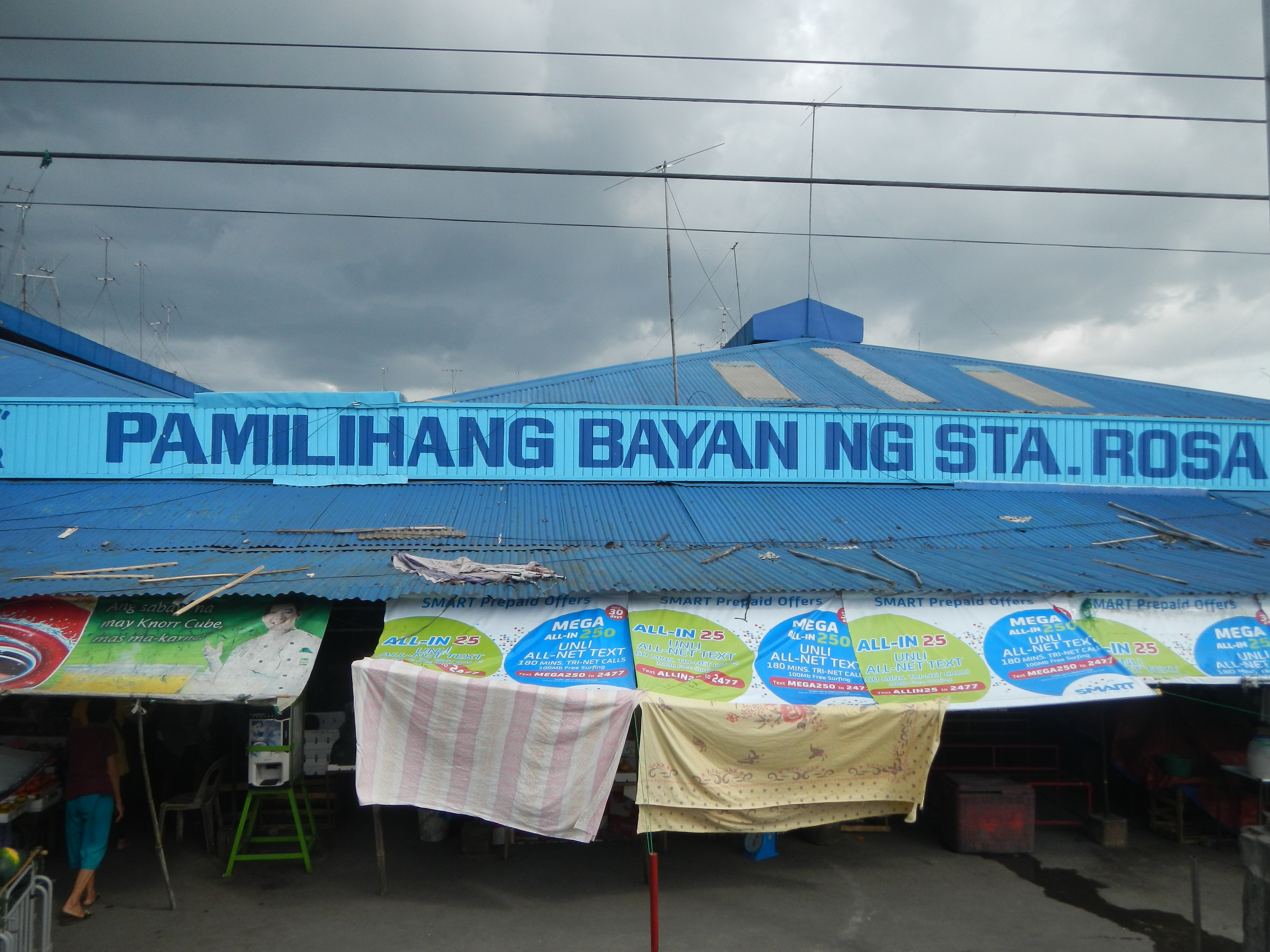
Public market

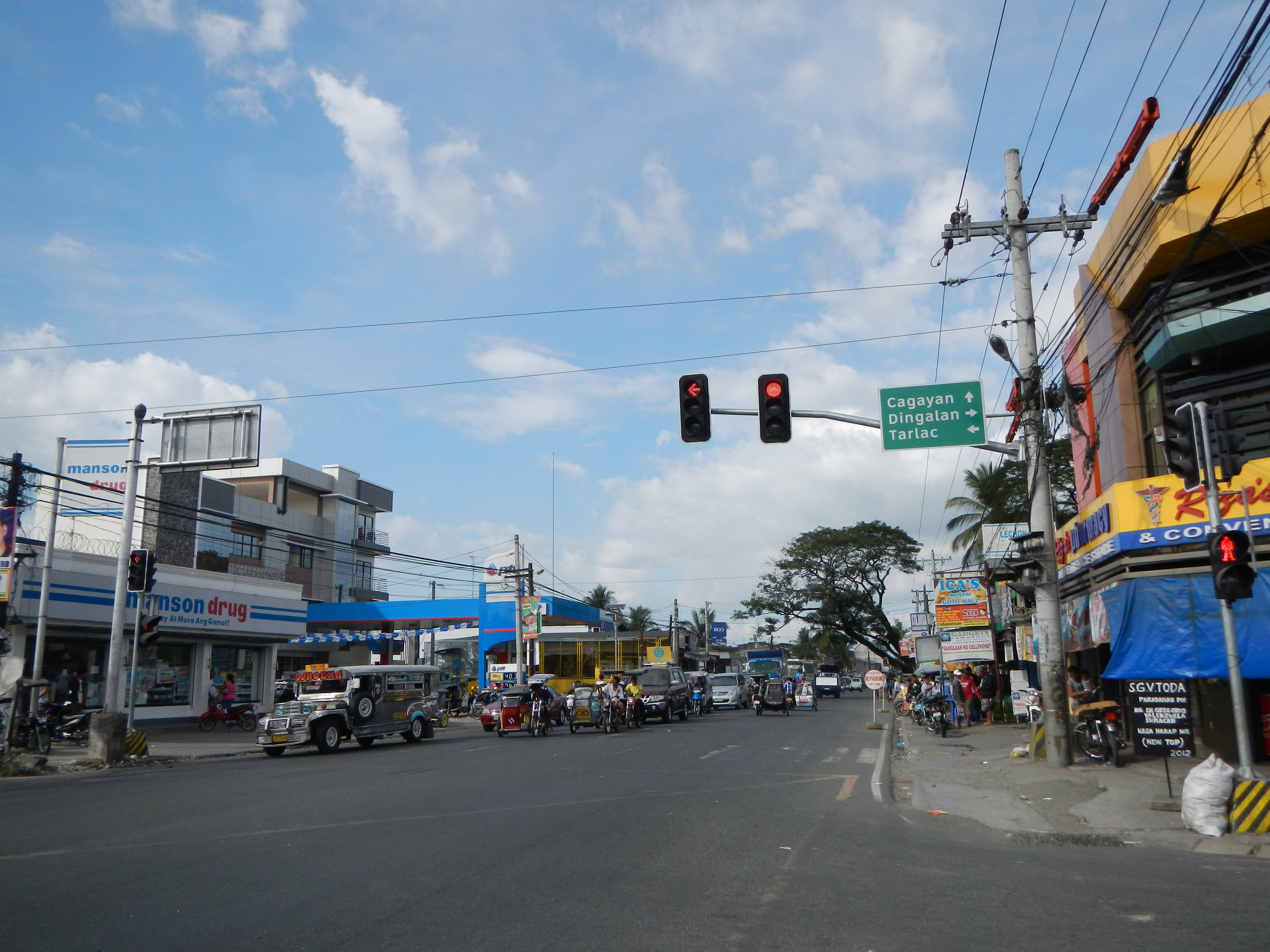
Crossing, Junction

== Sister cities ==
- Cabanatuan, Nueva Ecija
- Gapan, Nueva Ecija
- Aliaga, Nueva Ecija
- Santa Rosa City, Laguna
