= Villa Dolores, Catamarca =

Coordinates: 28°26′S 65°44′W

Villa Dolores (Catamarca)
- Municipality
- Interactive map of Villa Dolores (Catamarca)
- Country: Argentina
- Province: Catamarca Province
- Department: Greater San Fernando del Valle de Catamarca
- Time zone: UTC−3 (ART)

Villa Dolores (Catamarca) is a municipality in Catamarca Province in northwestern Argentina. It is located within the Greater San Fernando del Valle de Catamarca area.
