= Polcos =

Coordinates: 28.4350°S 65.7200°W

- Municipality
- Interactive map of Polcos
- Country: Argentina
- Province: Catamarca Province
- Department: Greater San Fernando del Valle de Catamarca
- Time zone: UTC−3 (ART)

Polcos is a municipality in Catamarca Province, located in northwestern Argentina. It is located within the Greater San Fernando del Valle de Catamarca area.
