= Barrio Bancario =

Coordinates: 28°28′S 65°47′W

- Municipality
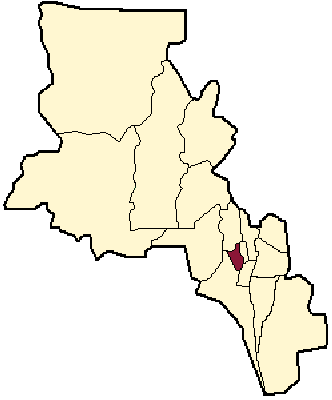
- Interactive map of Barrio Bancario
- Country: Argentina
- Province: Catamarca Province
- Department: Greater San Fernando del Valle de Catamarca

Government
  - Mayor: Ricardo Gaspar Guzman
- Time zone: UTC−3 (ART)
- Postcode: K4700
- Area code: 03833

Barrio Bancario is a municipality in Catamarca Province in northwestern Argentina. It is located within the Greater San Fernando del Valle de Catamarca area.
