= Pozo del Mistol =

Coordinates: 28°27′00″S 65°43′12″W

- Municipality
- Interactive map of Pozo del Mistol
- Country: Argentina
- Province: Catamarca Province
- Department: Greater San Fernando del Valle de Catamarca
- Time zone: UTC−3 (ART)

Pozo del Mistol is a municipality in Catamarca Province in northwestern Argentina. It is located within the Greater San Fernando del Valle de Catamarca area.
