= La Tercena =

Coordinates: 28°22′12″S 65°42′54″W

- Municipality
- Interactive map of La Tercena
- Country: Argentina
- Province: Catamarca Province
- Department: Greater San Fernando del Valle de Catamarca
- Time zone: UTC−3 (ART)

La Tercena is a municipality in Catamarca Province in northwestern Argentina, located within the Greater San Fernando del Valle de Catamarca area.
