= La Carrera, Catamarca =

Coordinates: 28°22′S 65°43′W

La Carrera (Catamarca)
- Municipality
- Interactive map of La Carrera (Catamarca)
- Country: Argentina
- Province: Catamarca Province
- Department: Greater San Fernando del Valle de Catamarca
- Time zone: UTC−3 (ART)

La Carrera (Catamarca) is a municipality in Catamarca Province in northwestern Argentina. It is located within the Greater San Fernando del Valle de Catamarca area.
