= Nueva Ecija's 3rd congressional district =

Legislative district of the Philippines

- Constituency for the House of Representatives of the Philippines
- Boundary of the 3rd congressional district in Nueva Ecija

- Location of Nueva Ecija within the Philippines
- Province: Nueva Ecija
- Region: Central Luzon
- Population: 589,607 (2015)
- Electorate: 411,583 (2019)
- Major settlements: 7 LGUs: Cities; Cabanatuan; Palayan; Municipalities; Bongabon; Gabaldon; General Mamerto Natividad; Laur; Santa Rosa
- Area: 1,384.55 km^{2} (534.58 sq mi)

Current constituency
- Created: 1987
- Representative: Jay Vergara
- Political party: PFP
- Congressional bloc: Majority

Nueva Ecija's 3rd congressional district is one of the four congressional districts of the Philippines in the province of Nueva Ecija. It has been represented in the House of Representatives since 1987. The district consists of the provincial capital city Palayan, its largest city Cabanatuan, and adjacent municipalities, namely Bongabon, Gabaldon, General Mamerto Natividad, Laur and Santa Rosa bordering Aurora. It is currently represented in the 20th Congress by Jay Vergara of the Partido Federal ng Pilipinas (PFP).

== Representation history ==
#	Image	Member	Term of office		Congress	Party	Electoral history	Constituent LGUs
#	Image	Member	Start	End	Congress	Party	Electoral history	Constituent LGUs
=== Nueva Ecija's 3rd district for the House of Representatives of the Philippines ===
District created February 2, 1987.
1		Hermogenes D. Concepcion Jr.	June 30, 1987	June 30, 1992	8th	Independent	Elected in 1987.	1987–present Bongabon, Cabanatuan, Gabaldon, General Mamerto Natividad, Laur, Palayan, Santa Rosa
2		Pacifico M. Fajardo	June 30, 1992	June 30, 2001	9th	NPC (BALANE)	Elected in 1992.	1987–present Bongabon, Cabanatuan, Gabaldon, General Mamerto Natividad, Laur, Palayan, Santa Rosa
2		Pacifico M. Fajardo	June 30, 1992	June 30, 2001	10th	Lakas	Re-elected in 1995.	1987–present Bongabon, Cabanatuan, Gabaldon, General Mamerto Natividad, Laur, Palayan, Santa Rosa
2		Pacifico M. Fajardo	June 30, 1992	June 30, 2001	11th	Lakas	Re-elected in 1998.	1987–present Bongabon, Cabanatuan, Gabaldon, General Mamerto Natividad, Laur, Palayan, Santa Rosa
3		Aurelio Umali	June 30, 2001	June 30, 2007	12th	LDP	Elected in 2001.	1987–present Bongabon, Cabanatuan, Gabaldon, General Mamerto Natividad, Laur, Palayan, Santa Rosa
3		Aurelio Umali	June 30, 2001	June 30, 2007	13th	Lakas	Re-elected in 2004.	1987–present Bongabon, Cabanatuan, Gabaldon, General Mamerto Natividad, Laur, Palayan, Santa Rosa
4		Czarina D. Umali	June 30, 2007	June 30, 2016	14th	Lakas (Unang Sigaw)	Elected in 2007.	1987–present Bongabon, Cabanatuan, Gabaldon, General Mamerto Natividad, Laur, Palayan, Santa Rosa
4		Czarina D. Umali	June 30, 2007	June 30, 2016	15th	Liberal (Unang Sigaw)	Re-elected in 2010.	1987–present Bongabon, Cabanatuan, Gabaldon, General Mamerto Natividad, Laur, Palayan, Santa Rosa
4		Czarina D. Umali	June 30, 2007	June 30, 2016	16th	Liberal (Unang Sigaw)	Re-elected in 2013.	1987–present Bongabon, Cabanatuan, Gabaldon, General Mamerto Natividad, Laur, Palayan, Santa Rosa
5		Rosanna Vergara	June 30, 2016	June 30, 2025	17th	NPC	Elected in 2016.	1987–present Bongabon, Cabanatuan, Gabaldon, General Mamerto Natividad, Laur, Palayan, Santa Rosa
5		Rosanna Vergara	June 30, 2016	June 30, 2025	17th	PDP–Laban	Elected in 2016.	1987–present Bongabon, Cabanatuan, Gabaldon, General Mamerto Natividad, Laur, Palayan, Santa Rosa
5		Rosanna Vergara	June 30, 2016	June 30, 2025	18th	PDP–Laban	Re-elected in 2019.	1987–present Bongabon, Cabanatuan, Gabaldon, General Mamerto Natividad, Laur, Palayan, Santa Rosa
5		Rosanna Vergara	June 30, 2016	June 30, 2025	19th	PFP	Re-elected in 2022.	1987–present Bongabon, Cabanatuan, Gabaldon, General Mamerto Natividad, Laur, Palayan, Santa Rosa
6		Julius Cesar V. Vergara	June 30, 2025	Incumbent	20th	PFP	Elected in 2025.	1987–present Bongabon, Cabanatuan, Gabaldon, General Mamerto Natividad, Laur, Palayan, Santa Rosa

== Election results ==
=== 2025 ===
Candidate	Party	Votes	%
Jay Vergara	Partido Federal ng Pilipinas	194,650	51.42
Czarina Umali	Unang Sigaw	183,912	48.58
Total		378,562	100.00
Valid votes		378,562	97.35
Invalid/blank votes		10,313	2.65
Total votes		388,875	100.00
Registered voters/turnout		466,379	83.38
Partido Federal ng Pilipinas hold			
Source: Commission on Elections

=== 2022 ===
2022 Philippine House of Representatives elections
Party	Candidate	Votes	%
PDP–Laban	Rosanna Vergara	180,888	53.08
Sigaw	Cherry Umali	159,922	46.92
Total votes		340,810	100.00
PDP–Laban hold			

=== 2019 ===
2019 Philippine House of Representatives elections
Party	Candidate	Votes	%
PDP–Laban	Rosanna Vergara	160,298	
Sigaw	Cherry Umali	120,674	
Total votes		280,972	
PDP–Laban hold			

== See also ==
- Legislative districts of Nueva Ecija
