= Rosanna Vergara =

Filipino businesswoman and politician (born 1963)

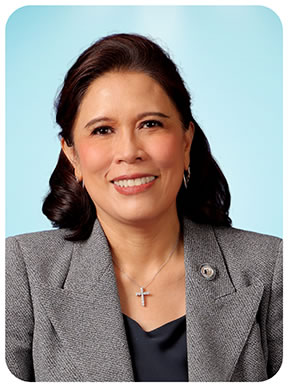
- Official portrait, 2022

Member of the House of Representatives from Nueva Ecija's 3rd district
- In office June 30, 2016 – June 20, 2025
- Preceded by: Czarina Umali
- Succeeded by: Jay Vergara

Personal details
- Born: November 5, 1963 (age 62) Quezon City, Philippines
- Party: PFP (2024–present)
- Other political affiliations: PDP–Laban (2017–2024); NPC (2015–2017)
- Spouse: Jay Vergara
- Children: 3
- Education: Ateneo de Manila University (BS); Fashion Institute of Technology; Harvard Business School (MBA)
- Occupation: Businesswoman, politician
- Nickname: Ria

Rosanna Vergara Vergara (born November 5, 1963), popularly known as Ria Vergara, is a Filipino businesswoman and politician who served as the representative of the 3rd district of Nueva Ecija in the House of Representatives of the Philippines from 2016 to 2025. She is a member of the Partido Federal ng Pilipinas and has held key leadership roles in the House, including Chairperson of the Committee on Ethics and Privileges.

== Early life and education ==
Rosanna V. Vergara was born on November 5, 1963, in Quezon City and raised in Cabanatuan City, Nueva Ecija, Philippines. She is the daughter of a prominent family in Nueva Ecija and has four siblings, including bankers Leopoldo Vergara and Francisca de Leon-Garcia.

Vergara earned her BS in Business Management from the Ateneo de Manila University. She later pursued a degree in Apparel Production Management at the Fashion Institute of Technology in New York, graduating Summa Cum Laude. She also holds a Master in Business Administration from Harvard Business School, which she completed in 1994.

== Business career ==
Before entering politics, Vergara had a successful career in the fashion and energy industries. She worked as a Production Manager at Calvin Klein Industries, Inc. and as a Production Coordinator at Natori, a New York-based fashion company.

In the Philippines, Vergara became the President and Chief Executive Officer of the Cabanatuan Electric Corporation (CELCOR). She also founded the First Cabanatuan Ventures Corporation (FCVC), a company involved in various business ventures.

== Political career ==
Vergara entered politics in 2016 when she was elected as the representative of the 3rd district of Nueva Ecija. In the 2019 elections, she ran under the PDP–Laban and defeated former congresswoman Czarina Umali of the local Unang Sigaw Party.

Since assuming office, Vergara has held several key positions in the House of Representatives, including: - **Chairperson**, House Committee on Ethics and Privileges - **Vice Chairperson**, House Committee on Basic Education and Culture - **Vice Chairperson**, House Committee on Trade and Industry

As a congresswoman, Vergara has focused on legislation aimed at improving education, trade, a<nd industry in her district.

== Personal life ==
Vergara is married to Jay Vergara, current representative and a former mayor. They have three children: Myca Vergara, the current mayor of Cabanatuan City, Jake, and Gae. The Vergara family is well-known in Nueva Ecija for their contributions to local governance and business.

== Electoral history ==
Electoral history of Rosanna Vergara
Year	Office	Party	Votes received				Result
Year	Office	Party	Total	%	P.	Swing	Result
2016	Representative (Nueva Ecija–3rd)	NPC	133,256	—N/a	1st	—N/a	Won
2019	Representative (Nueva Ecija–3rd)	PDP–Laban	160,298	—N/a	1st	—N/a	Won
2022	Representative (Nueva Ecija–3rd)	PDP–Laban	180,888	53.08%	1st	—N/a	Won
