= Collagasta =

Coordinates: 28°22′S 65°44′W

- Municipality and village
- Interactive map of Collagasta
- Country: Argentina
- Province: Catamarca Province
- Department: Fray Mamerto Esquiú
- Time zone: UTC−3 (ART)

Collagasta is a village and municipality within the Fray Mamerto Esquiú Department of Catamarca Province in northwestern Argentina.
