= General Mamerto Natividad =

Municipality in Nueva Ecija, Philippines

- Municipality
- Municipality of General Mamerto Natividad
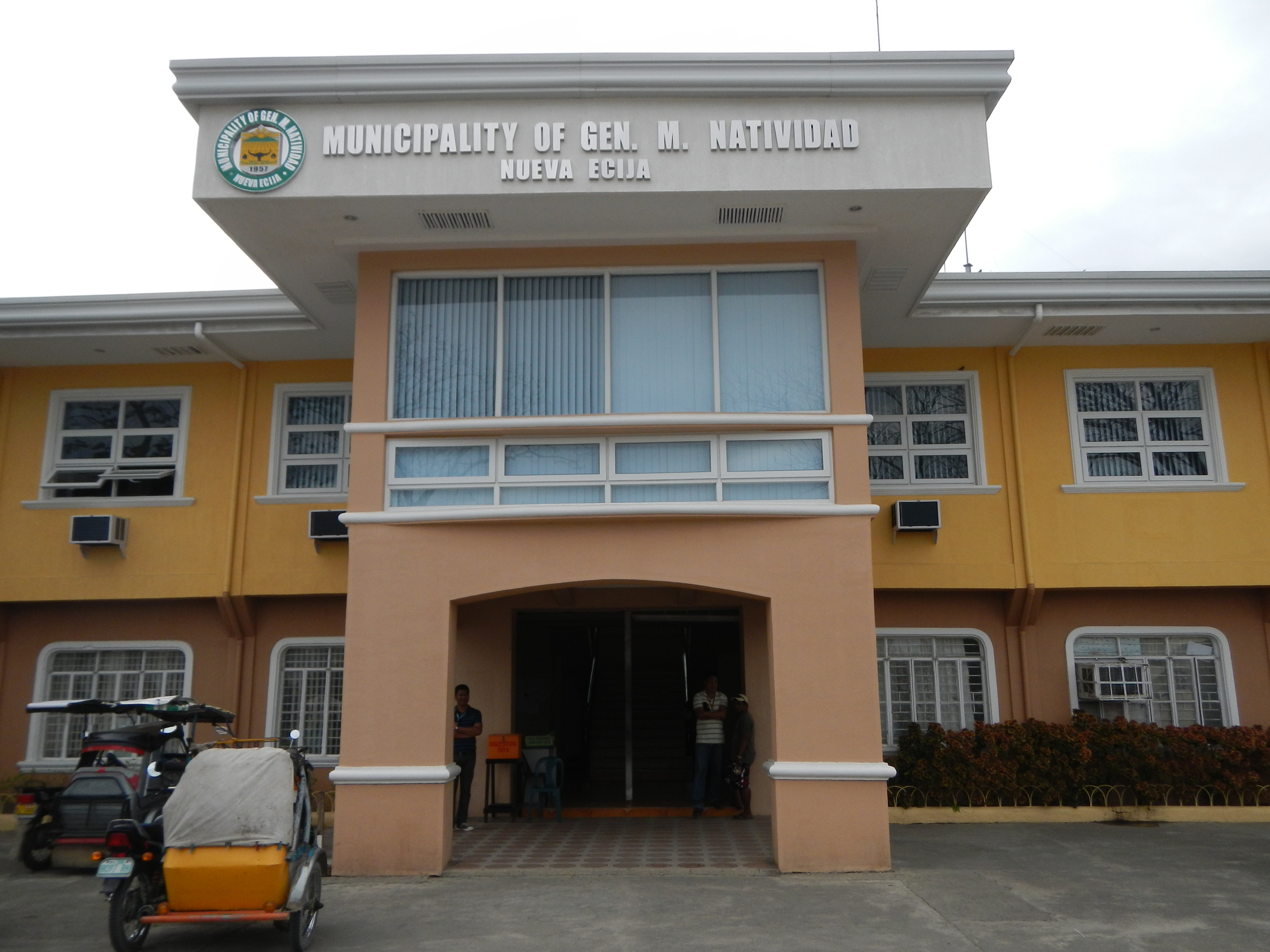
- Municipal Hall

- Seal

- Map of Nueva Ecija with General Mamerto Natividad highlighted
- Interactive map of General Mamerto Natividad
- Location within the Philippines
- Coordinates: 15°36′11″N 121°03′04″E
- Country: Philippines
- Region: Central Luzon
- Province: Nueva Ecija
- District: 3rd district
- Founded: 1957
- Named for: Mamerto Natividad
- Barangays: 20 (see Barangays)

Government
  - Type: Sangguniang Bayan
  - Mayor: Larry S. Ponce
  - Vice Mayor: Samson C. Caberto III
  - Representative: Julius Cesar V. Vergara
  - Municipal Council: Members: Cecilia G. Gamit; Sam Mykiel S. Caberto; Evangeline R. Tampengco; Julius N. Cruz; Janneth P. Diaz; Lance Jarwin A. Santos; Isaac Genesis H. Santos; Arnel B. Espino
  - Electorate: 31,136 voters (2025)

Area
  - Total: 533.08 km^{2} (205.82 sq mi)
- Elevation: 59 m (194 ft)
- Highest elevation: 82 m (269 ft)
- Lowest elevation: 45 m (148 ft)

Population (2024 census)
  - Total: 43,779
  - Density: 82.125/km^{2} (212.70/sq mi)
  - Households: 11,346

Economy
  - Income class: 2nd municipal income class
  - Poverty incidence: 11.27% (2023)
  - Revenue: ₱ 205.2 million (2024)
  - Assets: ₱ 694.2 million (2024)
  - Expenditure: ₱ 202.4 million (2024)
  - Liabilities: ₱ 252.5 million (2024)

Service provider
  - Electricity: Nueva Ecija 2 Area 2 Electric Cooperative (NEECO 2 A2)
- Time zone: UTC+8 (PST)
- ZIP code: 3125
- PSGC: 0304909000
- IDD : area code: +63 (0)44
- Native languages: Tagalog; Ilocano
- Website: genmnatividad.com

General Mamerto Natividad, officially the Municipality of General Mamerto Natividad (Tagalog: Bayan ng Heneral Mamerto Natividad, Ilocano: Ili ti Heneral Mamerto Natividad), also known as Gen. M. Natividad, is a municipality in the province of Nueva Ecija, Philippines. According to the 2024 census, it has a population of 43,779 people. It is named in honor of Filipino military leader Mamerto Natividad, who led battles against Spanish colonizers in Nueva Ecija during the Philippine Revolution.

== History ==
In 1957, the barrios of Mataas na Kahoy, Balangkare Norte, Balangkare Sur, Sapang Kawayan, Magasawang Sampaloc, Talabutab Norte, Talabutab Sur, Platero, Belen, Pecaleon, Piñahan, Kabulihan, Pasong-Hari, Balaring, Pulong Singkamas, Panaksak, Bravo, Sapang Bato, Burol, Miller, Tila Patio, Pula, Carinay, and Acacia in Cabanatuan were separated therefrom and constituted into a separate and independent municipality known as General Mamerto Natividad.

== Geography ==
=== Barangays ===
General Mamerto Natividad is politically subdivided into 20 barangays. Each barangay consist of puroks and some have sitios.

- Balangkare Norte
- Balangkare Sur
- Balaring
- Belen
- Bravo
- Burol
- Kabulihan
- Mag-asawang Sampaloc
- Manarog
- Mataas na Kahoy
- Panacsac
- Picaleon
- Piñahan
- Platero
- Poblacion
- Pula
- Pulong Singkamas
- Sapang Bato
- Talabutab Norte
- Talabutab Sur

=== Climate ===
Climate data for General Mamerto Natividad, Nueva Ecija
Month	Jan	Feb	Mar	Apr	May	Jun	Jul	Aug	Sep	Oct	Nov	Dec	Year
Mean daily maximum °C (°F)	29 (84)	30 (86)	31 (88)	33 (91)	33 (91)	31 (88)	30 (86)	29 (84)	29 (84)	30 (86)	30 (86)	29 (84)	30 (87)
Mean daily minimum °C (°F)	19 (66)	19 (66)	20 (68)	22 (72)	23 (73)	24 (75)	24 (75)	24 (75)	23 (73)	22 (72)	21 (70)	20 (68)	22 (71)
Average precipitation mm (inches)	4 (0.2)	6 (0.2)	7 (0.3)	12 (0.5)	61 (2.4)	89 (3.5)	96 (3.8)	99 (3.9)	81 (3.2)	88 (3.5)	37 (1.5)	13 (0.5)	593 (23.5)
Average rainy days	2.5	3.0	4.1	6.3	15.8	19.4	22.5	21.6	20.1	17.5	9.6	4.0	146.4
Source: Meteoblue

== Demographics ==
Population census of General Mamerto Natividad
Year	Pop.	±% p.a.
1960	9,539	—
1970	13,827	+3.78%
1975	14,405	+0.82%
1980	17,388	+3.83%
1990	21,984	+2.37%
1995	26,140	+3.30%
2000	29,195	+2.40%
2007	33,354	+1.85%
2010	36,720	+3.56%
2015	41,656	+2.43%
2020	44,311	+1.31%
2024	43,779	−0.29%
Source: Philippine Statistics Authority

== Economy ==
Poverty incidence of General Mamerto Natividad (%)

Source: Philippine Statistics Authority

== Education ==
The Gen. M. Natividad Schools District Office governs all educational institutions within the municipality. It oversees the management and operations of all private and public, from primary to secondary schools.

=== Primary and elementary schools ===
- Apolinario Santiago Elementary School
- Balangkare Elementary School
- Belen Elementary School
- Bravo Elementary School
- Burol Elementary School
- E.L. Joson Elementary School
- General M. Natividad Central School
- Kabulihan Elementary School
- Mag-Asawang Sampaloc Elementary School
- Manarog Elementary School
- Mataas Na Kahoy Elementary School
- Panacsac Elementary School
- Picaleon Elementary School
- Platero Elementary School
- Pulong Singkamas Elementary School
- St. Paul School
- Talabutab Norte EIEMELIF Learning Center
- Talabutab Norte Elementary School
- Talabutab Norte Methodist Learning Center
- Talabutab Sur Elementary School
- Valdez Memorial Learning Center

=== Secondary schools ===
- Azarcon Integrated School
- Eduardo L. Joson Memorial High School
- Gen. Mamerto Natividad National High School
- Mataas Na Kahoy National High School
- Talabutab Norte National High School
- Virginia D. Dulay Integrated School
