= San José de Fray Mamerto Esquiú =

San José
- Location in Argentina
- Coordinates: 28°22′S 65°42′W
- Country: Argentina
- Province: Catamarca
- Department: Fray Mamerto Esquiú
- 2nd level Municipality: San José
- Elevation: 580 m (1,900 ft)

Population (2001 census [INDEC])
  - Total: 2,064
- Time zone: UTC−3 (ART)
- CPA Base: K 4709
- Area code: +54 3833

San José de Fray Mamerto Esquiú or simply San José is a town in Catamarca Province, Argentina. It is the head town of the Fray Mamerto Esquiú Department. It is part of the Gran San Fernando del Valle de Catamarca urban agglomeration.
