= San Antonio, Fray Mamerto Esquiú =

Coordinates: 28.4191°S 65.7092°W

San Antonio (Fray Mamerto Esquiú)
- Municipality
- Interactive map of San Antonio (Fray Mamerto Esquiú)
- Country: Argentina
- Province: Catamarca Province
- Department: Greater San Fernando del Valle de Catamarca
- Time zone: UTC−3 (ART)

San Antonio (Fray Mamerto Esquiú) is a municipality in Catamarca Province in northwestern Argentina. It is located within the Greater San Fernando del Valle de Catamarca area.
