= Pomancillo Oeste =

Coordinates: 28°19′S 65°43′W

- Municipality and village
- Interactive map of Pomancillo Oeste
- Country: Argentina
- Province: Catamarca Province
- Time zone: UTC−3 (ART)

Pomancillo Oeste is a village and municipality in Catamarca Province in northwestern Argentina.
