= Laur, Nueva Ecija =

Municipality in Nueva Ecija, Philippines

Laur Bayan ng Laur Ili ti Laur
- Municipality
- Municipality of Laur
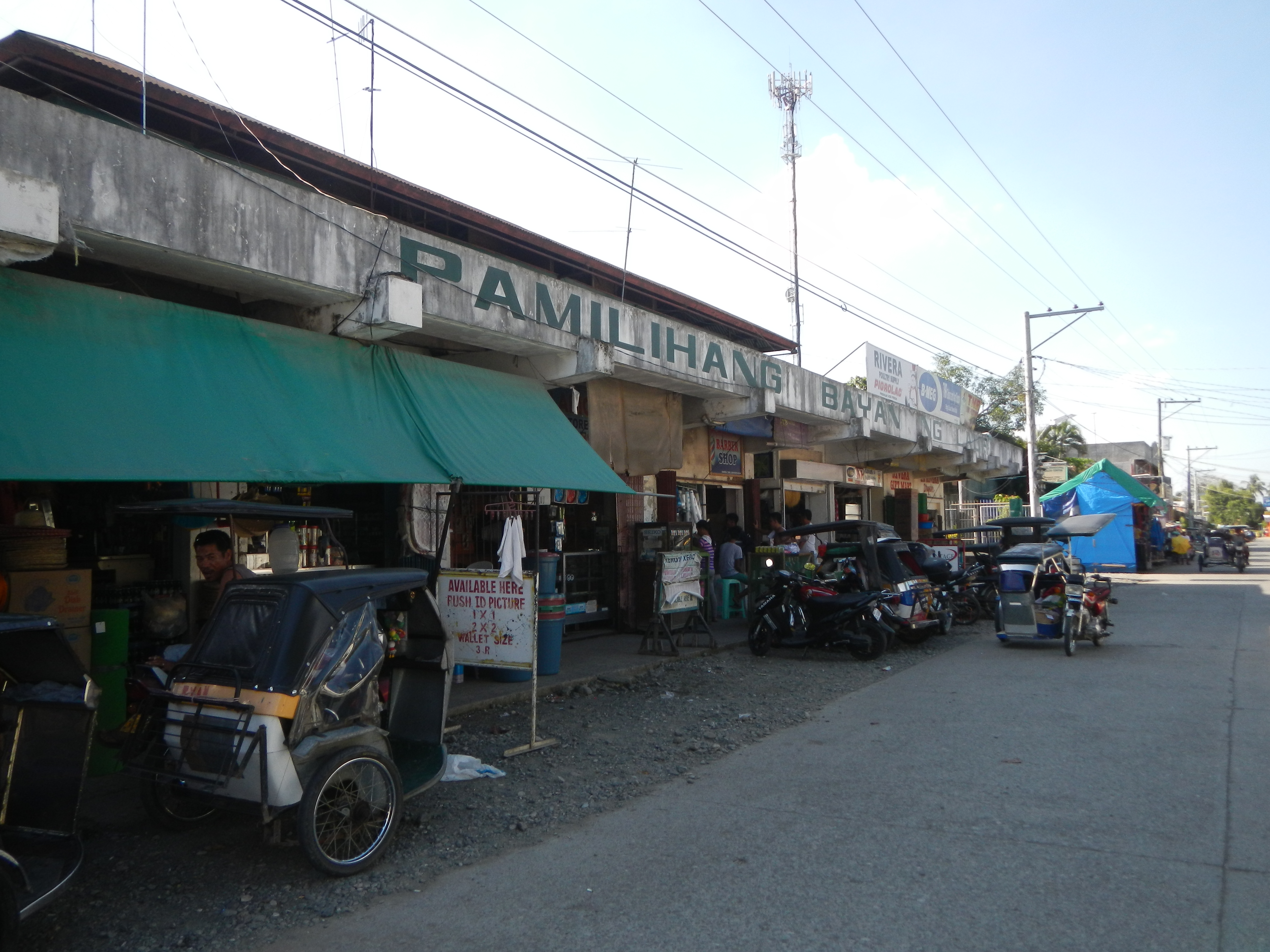
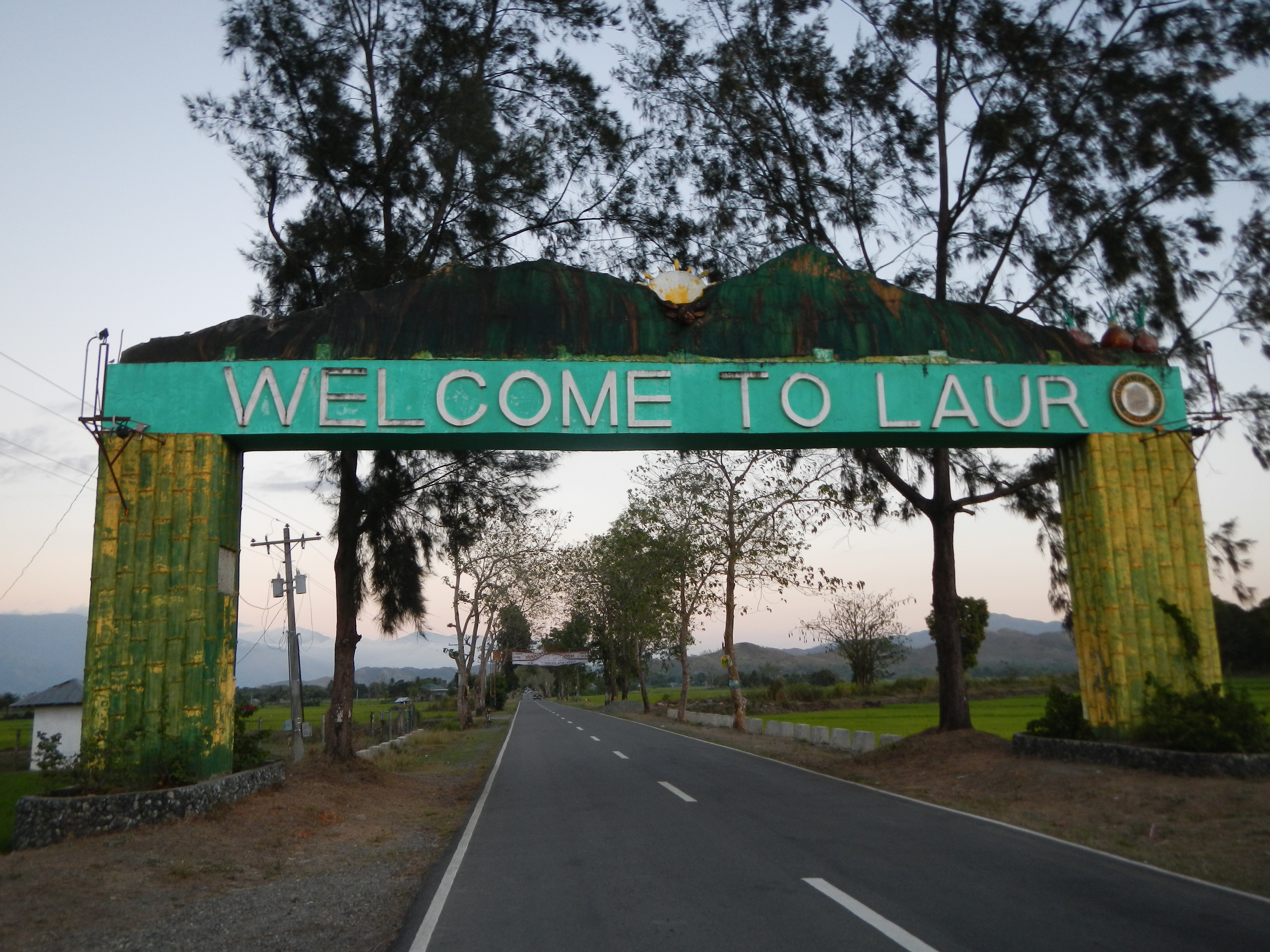
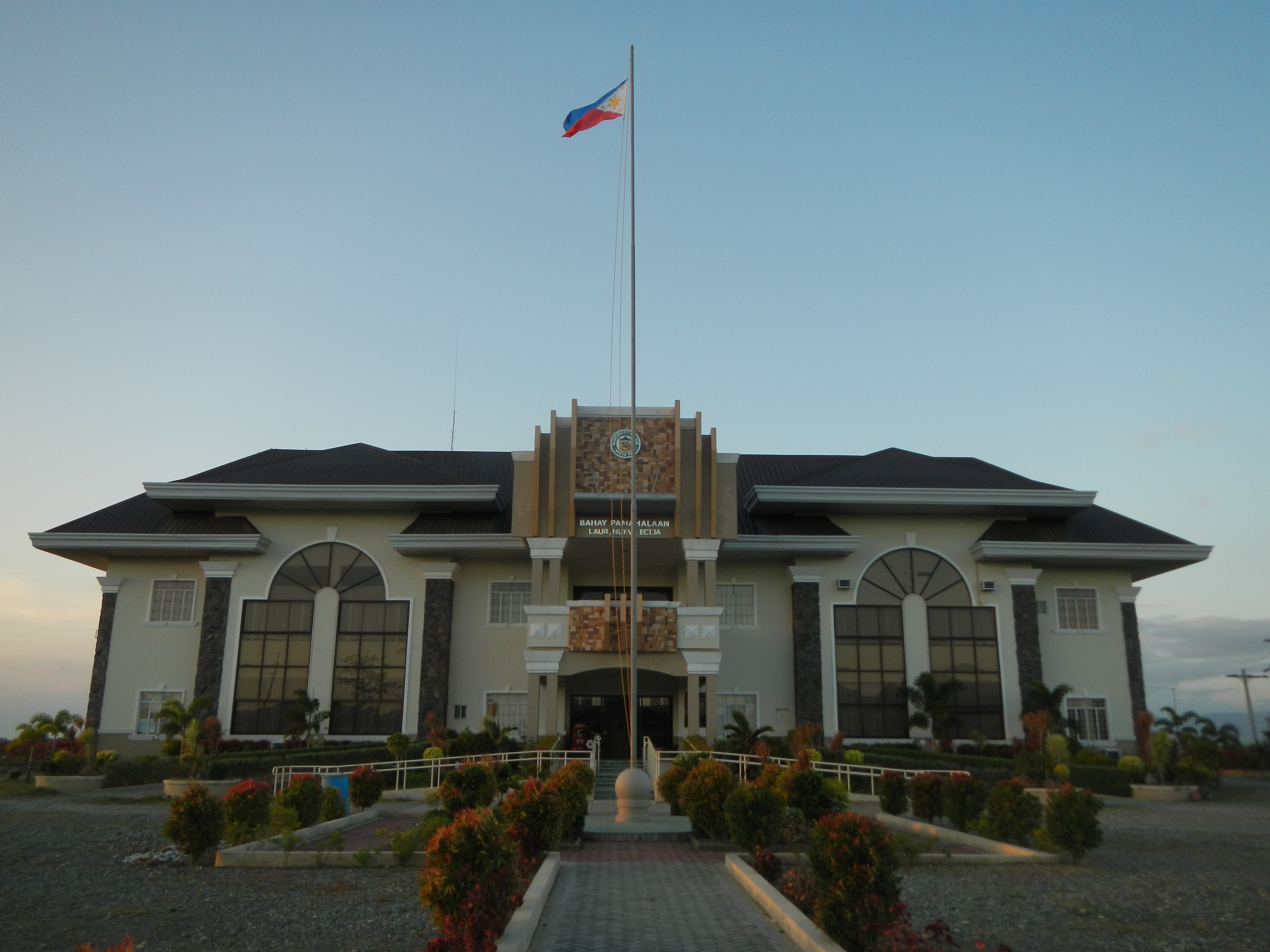
- Laur Public Market Laur Welcome Arch Laur Municipal Hall

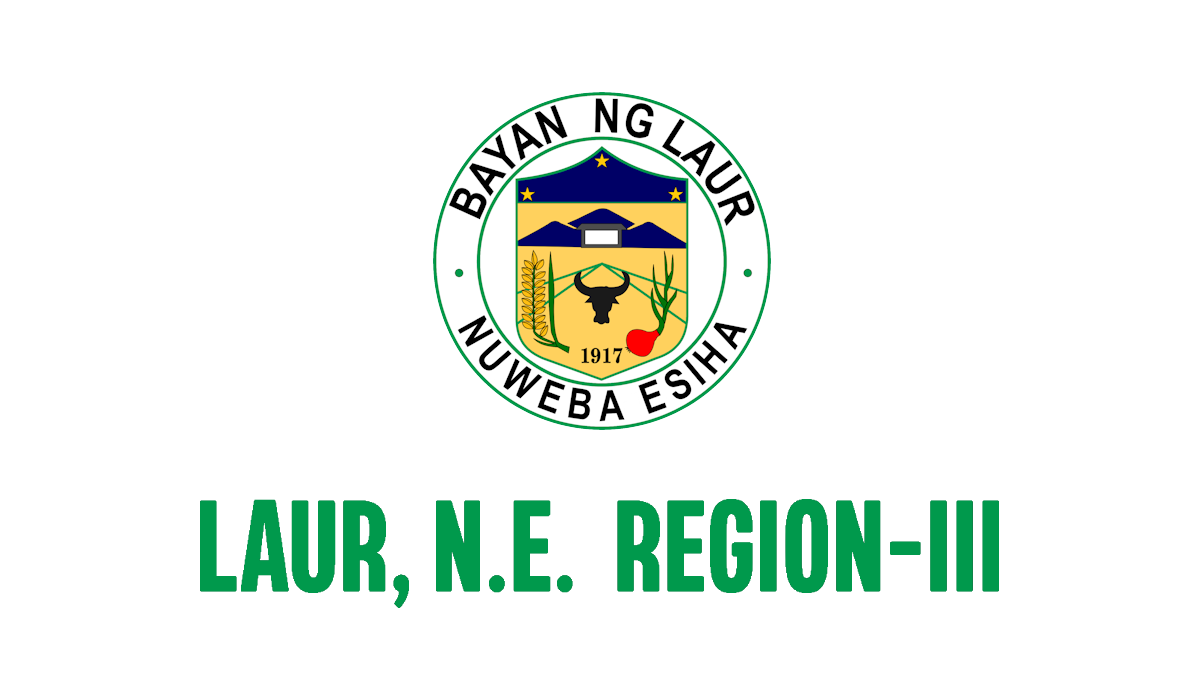
- Flag Seal

- Map of Nueva Ecija with Laur highlighted
- Interactive map of Laur
- Location within the Philippines
- Coordinates: 15°34′47″N 121°11′11″E
- Country: Philippines
- Region: Central Luzon
- Province: Nueva Ecija
- District: 3rd district
- Founded: January 13, 1917
- Named for: Laureana Quijano Tinio, wife of General Manuel Tinio
- Barangays: 17 (see Barangays)

Government
  - Type: Sangguniang Bayan
  - Mayor: Benjamin Alivia Padilla
  - Vice Mayor: Christopher Daus
  - Representative: Rosanna V. Vergara
  - Municipal Council: Members: Benjamin A. Padilla; Elmer N. Rivera; Jesusa D. Samano; Marina M. Padilla; Bernardo G. Ordanza Jr.; Romeo A. Desamito; Raymundo D. Lulunan; Divina A. dela Cruz
  - Electorate: 27,339 voters (2025)

Area
  - Total: 295.88 km^{2} (114.24 sq mi)
- Elevation: 100 m (330 ft)
- Highest elevation: 1,750 m (5,740 ft)
- Lowest elevation: 58 m (190 ft)

Population (2024 census)
  - Total: 40,185
  - Density: 135.82/km^{2} (351.76/sq mi)
  - Households: 9,510
- Demonym: Laureños

Economy
  - Income class: 1st municipal income class
  - Poverty incidence: 15.42% (2023)
  - Revenue: ₱ 232.9 million (2024)
  - Assets: ₱ 681.5 million (2024)
  - Expenditure: ₱ 204 million (2024)
  - Liabilities: ₱ 96.17 million (2024)

Service provider
  - Electricity: Nueva Ecija 2 Area 2 Electric Cooperative (NEECO 2 A2)
- Time zone: UTC+8 (PST)
- ZIP code: 3129
- PSGC: 0304913000
- IDD : area code: +63 (0)44
- Native languages: Tagalog; Ilocano
- Catholic diocese: Diocese of Cabanatuan
- Patron saint: Stephen I of Hungary

Laur, officially the Municipality of Laur (Tagalog: Bayan ng Laur, Ilocano: Ili ti Laur), is a municipality in the province of Nueva Ecija in Central Luzon region of Philippines. According to the 2024 census, it has a population of 40,185 people.

== Etymology ==
The town was named after the wife of Revolutionary General Manuel Tinio, Laureana.

== History ==
Originally, the town was a barrio of the municipality of Bongabon named San Esteban, after its patron saint, Stephen I of Hungary. Migrant settlers in the village were mostly Tagalog and Ilocano from the provinces of the Ilocos Region and Pangasinan, while some were Kapampangan from the provinces of Pampanga and Tarlac.

On January 13, 1917, under the American-controlled Insular Government, Governor-General Francis Burton Harrison issued Executive Order No. 98 to separate Laur from Bongabon. It was renamed after Laureana Quijano Tinio, wife of General Manuel Tinio who fought in the Philippine Revolution against the Spanish Empire. He would also have a town honoring him when Laur’s southern neighbour Papaya was renamed "General Tinio".

After President Ferdinand Marcos had imposed nationwide Martial Law in 1972, arrested opposition Senators Benigno Aquino, Jr. and Jose W. Diokno were kept in solitary confinement at Fort Magsaysay in Laur for 30 days in 1973. It is now a museum housing the Armed Forces of the Philippines - Center for Human Rights Dialogue.

== Geography ==
Laur is located at the foothills of the Sierra Madre Mountains. It is 15 kilometres (9.3 mi) from Palayan, 145 kilometres (90 mi) from Manila, and 117 kilometres (73 mi) from Baler.

=== Barangays ===
Laur is politically subdivided into 17 barangays, as shown below. Each barangay consist of puroks and some have sitios.

- Barangay I (Poblacion)
- Barangay II (Poblacion)
- Barangay III (Poblacion)
- Barangay IV (Poblacion)
- Betania
- Canantong
- Nauzon
- Pangarulong
- Pinagbayanan
- Sagana
- San Fernando
- San Isidro
- San Josep
- San Juan
- San Vicente
- Siclong
- San Felipe

=== Climate ===
Climate data for Laur, Nueva Ecija
Month	Jan	Feb	Mar	Apr	May	Jun	Jul	Aug	Sep	Oct	Nov	Dec	Year
Mean daily maximum °C (°F)	27 (81)	28 (82)	29 (84)	31 (88)	31 (88)	30 (86)	30 (86)	30 (86)	29 (84)	29 (84)	29 (84)	27 (81)	29 (85)
Mean daily minimum °C (°F)	20 (68)	20 (68)	21 (70)	22 (72)	24 (75)	24 (75)	24 (75)	24 (75)	24 (75)	23 (73)	22 (72)	21 (70)	22 (72)
Average precipitation mm (inches)	25 (1.0)	26 (1.0)	18 (0.7)	24 (0.9)	91 (3.6)	145 (5.7)	149 (5.9)	122 (4.8)	120 (4.7)	128 (5.0)	61 (2.4)	52 (2.0)	961 (37.7)
Average rainy days	7.7	5.7	6.8	8.0	18.2	22.1	24.3	23.4	22.7	17.5	10.0	9.4	175.8
Source: Meteoblue

== Demographics ==
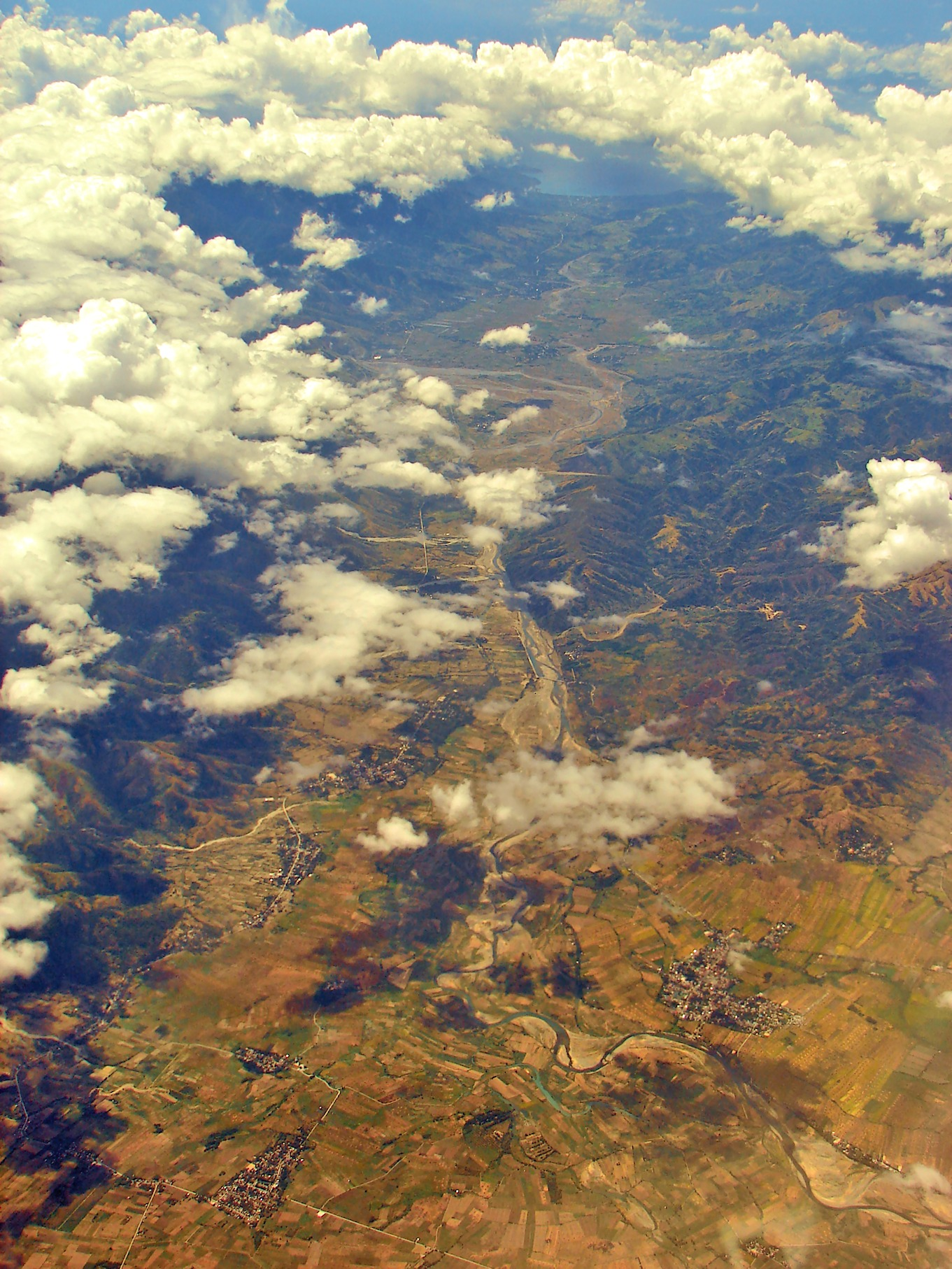
Aerial view of Laur with Dingalan Bay in the distant background

Population census of Laur

Year	Pop.	±% p.a.
1918	3,207	—
1939	13,634	+7.13%
1948	16,964	+2.46%
1960	11,165	−3.43%
1970	14,085	+2.35%
1975	16,896	+3.72%
1980	17,729	+0.97%
1990	21,464	+1.93%

Year	Pop.	±% p.a.
1995	25,143	+3.01%
2000	26,902	+1.46%
2007	30,997	+1.97%
2010	32,205	+1.40%
2015	35,656	+1.96%
2020	38,263	+1.50%
2024	40,185	+1.18%

Source: Philippine Statistics Authority

== Economy ==
Poverty incidence of Laur (%)

Source: Philippine Statistics Authority

== Education ==
The Laur Schools District Office governs all educational institutions within the municipality. It oversees the management and operations of all private and public, from primary to secondary schools.

=== Primary and elementary schools ===
- Betania Elementary School
- Camias Elementary School
- Canantong Elementary School
- Casa Real Elementary School
- Laur Central School
- Laur West Elementary School
- Mainit Elementary School
- Nauzon Elementary School
- Pinagbayanan Elementary School
- Sagana Elementary School
- San Antonio Elementary School
- San Felipe Elementary School
- San Fernando Elementary School
- San Isidro Elementary School
- San Josep Elementary School
- San Juan Elementary School
- San Vicente Elementary School
- Siclong Elementary School
- St. Stephen's Academy

=== Secondary schools ===
- Hilario E. Hermosa Memornial High School
- Jorge M. Padilla National High School
- Ricardo Dizon Canlas Agricultural High School

== See also ==
- Philippine Carabao Center
