= Claudio Mamerto Cuenca =

Argentine physician and poet

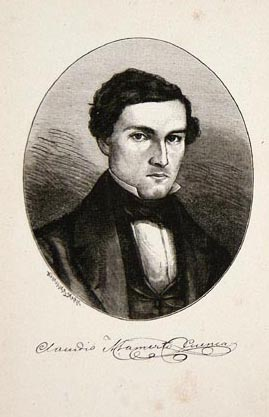
- Born: Claudio José del Corazón de Jesús Cuenca; 30 October 1812; Buenos Aires, United Provinces of the Río de la Plata
- Died: 3 February 1852 (aged 39); El Palomar de Caseros, Argentine Confederation
- Resting place: La Recoleta Cemetery
- Occupations: doctor and poet
- Employer: Argentine Army

Claudio Mamerto Cuenca (30 October 1812 – 3 February 1852) was an Argentine medical doctor and poet.

The Spanish mercenary José Pons Ojeda (who called himself "León de Palleja"), a member of the Grand Army of General Justo José de Urquiza who fought Juan Manuel de Rosas in the Platine War in 1852, killed him because Cuenca wanted to protect the wounded in his field hospital, immediately after the Battle of Caseros.

== Biography ==
=== Early life ===
Claudio Mamerto Cuenca was born in Buenos Aires, the son of Justo Casimiro Cuenca and Lucía Calvo. His baptismal name was Claudio José del Corazón de Jesús Cuenca, and it is not known for what reason he changed it to Claudio Mamerto Cuenca. He did his first letters in the parish house to enter the Real Colegio de San Carlos at the age of 16, that in those years was merged with the Conciliar Seminary, directed by the Jesuits and worked next to the temple of San Ignacio. An excellent student, he graduated from high school with outstanding grades and four years later he entered the Medical Department of the University of Buenos Aires. Cuenca's family was marked by the decision of four of the five children, José María, Claudio Mamerto, Salustiano and Amaro, to become doctors. Claudio and Salustiano managed to stand out. The latter, following in the footsteps of the former, became an outstanding surgeon, and upon his death succeeded him in the Chair of Anatomy and Physiology. He died during a cholera epidemic in 1859.

At the University of Buenos Aires he had as professors Diego Alcorta, León Banegas and Miguel García, and in medicine, Ireneo Portela, Gómez de Fonseca, Francisco de Paula Almeyra, Juan José Fontana and Fuentes Arguibel. In the Hospital de la Residencia, lectures were given for the study of specific subjects, but many times, the teacher's house was where the classes were led with the help of figures and anatomical atlases.

=== Career as doctor ===
On 30 October 1838, Claudio Cuenca received his medical degree and began acting as a professional He then wrote a thesis which he called Booklet about sympathies in general , and obtained the title of Doctor of Medicine. Doctors Juan A. Fernández, Almería, Gómez de Fonseca and others contributed to his training He finished his studies in 1839. In 1840, when Dr. Ireneo Portela emigrated for political reasons, Cuenca was named his substitute in the chair of Anatomy and Physiology.

He developed a professional and teaching career; he was described as an excellent surgeon by Teodoro Álvarez. In 1844, he published a biography of Dr. José M. Gómez de Fonseca in the Argentine press. When Dr. Ventura Bosch ―Juan Manuel de Rosas's personal physician― left for Europe, Dr. Cuenca came second in the list of professionals who could succeed him, along with Dr. Juan José Montes de Oca and with a French doctor named Solier, of great prestige. However, Rosas opted for Dr. Cuenca, and he began to work for him.

In 1851 he was appointed Surgeon Major of the Army. He also developed at the University of Buenos Aires the chairs of anatomy, physiology, medical material and surgery. Simultaneously with his profession, he assiduously composed epigrams, idylls, madrigals, comedies, dramas, etc. Cuenca was intimately adverse to Rosas's politics, and this was pointed out in his poetic production. In the eyes of society, the young doctor devoted himself fully to his profession and to the dictation of his chair. Nothing allowed to perceive the hidden drama that tormented him of having to be part of Rosas's men and in his intimacy he vented spiritually with his prolific literary production, production that he knows all the styles and that he keeps hidden. And so, having become the personal physician and chief surgeon of the Rosas army, he dedicated himself to poetry - he carried his poems in a briefcase that he did not let go of even when sleeping, since he often used it as a pillow.

=== Battle of Caseros and legacy ===
In compliance with his military obligations, his role as a doctor found him in the Battle of Caseros on 3 February 1852, attending the field hospital built behind the Palomar de Caseros.

General Justo José de Urquiza then ordered the Uruguayan general César Díaz to attack. In the company was, with the rank of colonel, the Spanish mercenary José Pons Ojeda, who called himself "León de Palleja".

From the top of the viewpoint, the leaders of the Palomar ―together with Cuenca― take stock of the situation and, upon verifying the great numerical disadvantage, decide to capitulate. The white flag is raised and the fire ceases. Cuenca goes to his improvised hospital built in the open air and resumes the tasks of staunching wounds. With great surprise he feels a closed volley of rifle fire.
Rosas's soldiers, ignoring the surrender, waited for the arrival - with the purpose of parleying - of a platoon of the victorious troops. But when they enter, they fire at them point-blank. Once the smoke had dissipated, the clothesline was seen on the ground. What happened minutes later is unspeakable... While the bugles sounded like a slaughter, Urquiza's troops were seen advancing and getting his soldiers into every corner, massacring the residents. Dr. Cuenca, without losing his composure, unarmed, and exhibiting the lint in his hand, tried to address the head of the assailant troop, Commander Palleja and, apparently, made himself known and asked for protection for his wounded. For all answer he received several saber blows; he was pierced by a thrust and a minute later he fell lifeless on the pavement.

— Dr. Juan Corbella

Cuenca died in the arms of doctors Claudio Mejía and Nicomedes Reynal. Mejía, coa faithful friend of Cuenca's, was taken prisoner by Urquiza's forces, but managed to recover Cuenca's corpse – with saber wounds to the head, shoulders and arms, and a stab in the belly – and the inseparable briefcase of his friend with his poetic work. A poem titled Mi cara was found in a pocket of the military doctor's jacket:

This impassive face, stiff, shadowy,
until woe is me! For the one I love, the cold.
Without fire, without passion, without light, without anything,
don't think it's oh no! my face.
Because this, friend, the indifference and cold,
that I bring almost always, is studied...
its artificial face, masked and here, for both, hypocrisy.
And having to be all appearance,
dissimulation, lie, pretense
and a cunning artifice in my existence,

So I have to lie, friend, and I lie.

— Claudio Cuenca

No official part reported Cuenca's death. According to Dr. Corbella, "the complicit silence of some characters who were actors in the taking of the Palomar and who could well [...] publicly mourn Cuenca's death but did not do so" is striking. Cuenca was buried on the spot, but eight months later, on 10 September 1852, his friends had him exhumed and transferred his remains to the Recoleta Cemetery, in the vault of his sister Eulogia's family, the Mugicas.

In 1861, the poet Heraclio Fajardo compiled and published his poetry in three volumes. Among these stood out Visión, To Córdoba, El pampero, El corazón, To the oath of independence and ' 'Deliriums of the heart'.

In 1889, the Garnier publishing house, from Paris, published his "Selected Poetic Works" in Spanish, with a biography written by Dr. Teodoro Álvarez.

== Tributes ==
Several places in Argentina are named after him:

- A street in the town of El Palomar de Caseros, where he died.
- A street in the town of Olivos, in Greater Buenos Aires.
- A street in the city of Buenos Aires, which first bore the name of Barcelona, then of Juárez Celman, and, on November 27, 1893, Claudio Cuenca.
- A street in the city of Córdoba
- The Sarmiento railway station in the town of Tres Algarrobos (province of Buenos Aires) is called Estación Cuenca.
