= Bongabon =

Municipality in Nueva Ecija, Philippines

Bongabon Santor
- Municipality
- Municipality of Bongabon
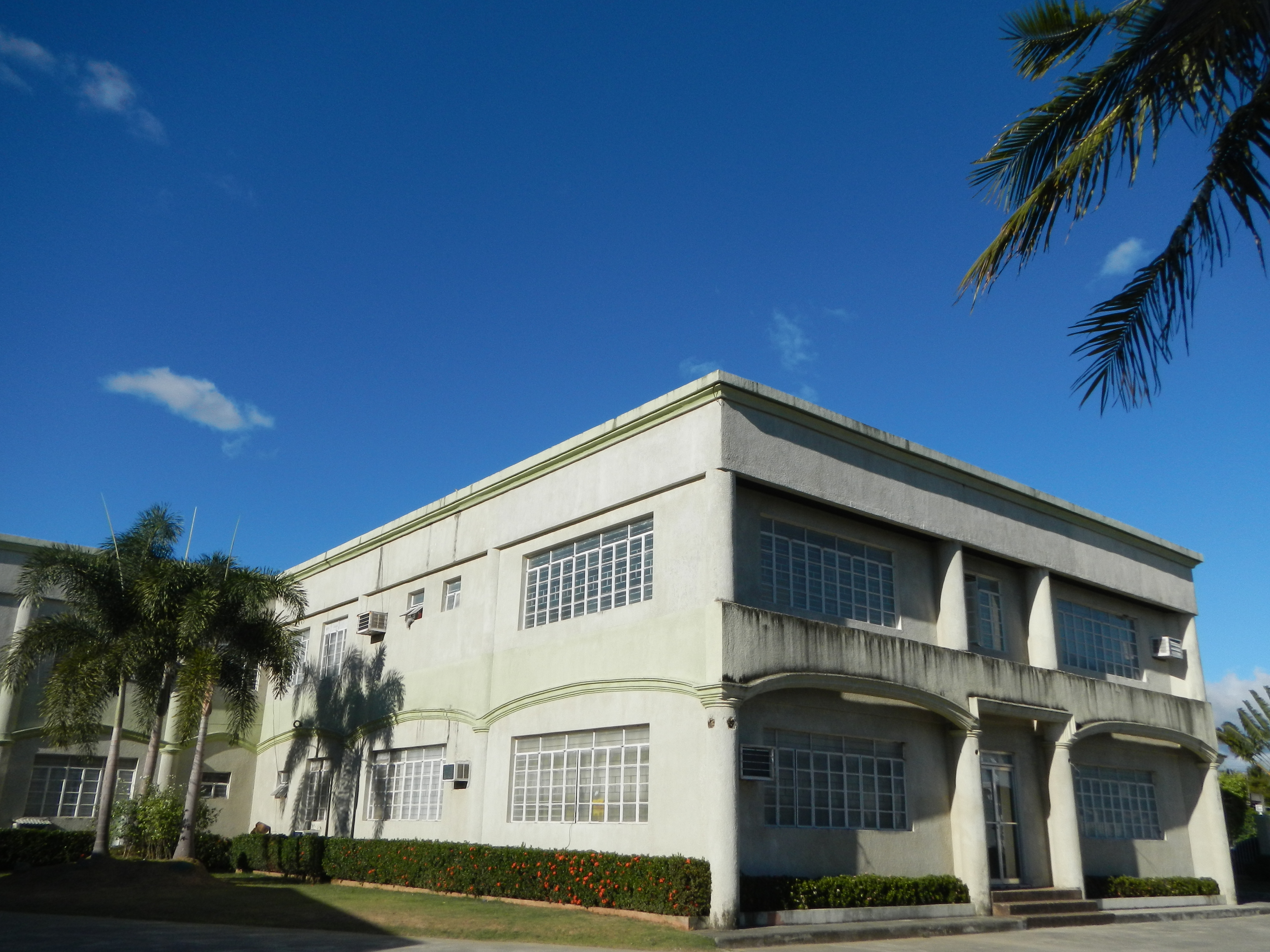
- Municipal Hall

- Seal
- Nickname: Onion Capital of the Philippines
- Map of Nueva Ecija with Bongabon highlighted
- Interactive map of Bongabon
- Location within the Philippines
- Coordinates: 15°37′56″N 121°08′41″E
- Country: Philippines
- Region: Central Luzon
- Province: Nueva Ecija
- District: 3rd district
- Founded: 1760
- Barangays: 28 (see Barangays)

Government
  - Type: Sangguniang Bayan
  - Mayor: Ricardo I. Padilla
  - Vice Mayor: Christian P. Binuya
  - Representative: Rosanna V. Vergara
  - Municipal Council: Members: Christian P. Binuya; Victor P. dela Cruz; Melodie G. dela Cruz; Gregorio C. Pesa; Hilario Bobby D. Mantile; Alexander R. Guerrero; Gina C. Morales; Lope C. Valmonte
  - Electorate: 48,923 voters (2025)

Area
  - Total: 286.95 km^{2} (110.79 sq mi)
- Elevation: 76 m (249 ft)
- Highest elevation: 279 m (915 ft)
- Lowest elevation: 54 m (177 ft)

Population (2024 census)
  - Total: 69,376
  - Density: 241.77/km^{2} (626.18/sq mi)
  - Households: 16,305

Economy
  - Income class: 1st municipal income class
  - Poverty incidence: 11.66% (2023)
  - Revenue: ₱ 357.9 million (2024)
  - Assets: ₱ 1,180 million (2024)
  - Expenditure: ₱ 358 million (2024)
  - Liabilities: ₱ 599.8 million (2024)

Service provider
  - Electricity: Nueva Ecija 2 Area 2 Electric Cooperative (NEECO 2 A2)
- Time zone: UTC+8 (PST)
- ZIP code: 3128
- PSGC: 0304902000
- IDD : area code: +63 (0)44
- Native languages: Ilocano; Tagalog
- Website: bongabon.ph

Bongabon, officially the Municipality of Bongabon (Ilocano: Ili ti Bongabon; Tagalog: Bayan ng Bongabon), is a municipality in the province of Nueva Ecija, Philippines. According to the 2024 census, it has a population of 69,376 people.

Bongabon is the leading producer of onion in the Philippines and in Southeast Asia. Each barangay in Bongabon has its own fiesta. The town fiesta, celebrated annually from the 1st to 2nd week of April, is known as the Sibuyasan (Onion) Festival.

Bongabon is 14 kilometres (8.7 mi) from Palayan, 144 kilometres (89 mi) from Manila, and 88 kilometres (55 mi) from baler

== History ==
=== Spanish colonial era ===
Bongabon was the capital of Nueva Ecija after Baler. The Augustinian missionaries who preached Catholicism in Pampanga extended their outposts into what is now the province of Nueva Ecija by following the Rio Grande de Pampanga. Thus, Santol (present day Barangay Santor) was part of Pantabangan and established in 1659. In 1760, Bongabon was named as a town and parish under the patronage of St. Francis of Assisi. The natives of the area are Bugkalot and Aeta or Dumagat. The name of Bongabon was derived from Bungamong, which in turn derived from bunga, the Bugkalot term for areca nut or betel nut, which is abundant in the town.

Migrant-settlers of the community were mostly Tagalog and Ilocanos from the Ilocos Region and Pangasinan, with some Kapampangans from Pampanga and Tarlac.

==== Philippine revolution ====
When the Philippine Revolution transpired from 1896 to 1898 against Spain, revolutionaries with the aid of Katipunero rebels and started the Siege of Bongabon, fought Spanish colonial forces, and liberated the town. The Filipino revolutionary troops and Katipunero rebel fighters captured the municipal town after the siege forcing the Spanish troops to retreat.

=== American occupation ===
With the outbreak of the Philippine–American War on 1899 to 1902, the town saw the arrival of American troops which fought the Filipino revolutionary troops and Katipuneros in the Battle of Bongabon on 1899. In the ensuing battle, the town was captured by the American troops.

=== Philippine independence ===
On April 28, 1949, Aurora Quezon, her daughter Maria Aurora "Baby" Quezon, then a law student at the University of Santo Tomas, her son-in-law Felipe "Philip" Buencamino (husband of "Nini" and brother-in-law of "Baby") and Quezon City Mayor Ponciano Bernardo were assassinated by Hukbalahap rebels in this town while traveling in Aurora's Buick sedan along the Baler–Bongabon Road connecting Baler with Nueva Ecija, which Aurora Quezon herself inaugurated in 1940, to open the Quezon Memorial Hospital in Baler, Aurora, hometown of Aurora and her husband Manuel Quezon, then a town of Nueva Ecija before 1902 and a town of Quezon Province since 1902 and in 1949.

== Geography ==
=== Barangays ===
Bongabon is politically subdivided into 28 barangays. Each barangay consists of puroks and some have sitios.

- Antipolo
- Ariendo
- Bantug
- Calaanan
- Commercial (Poblacion)
- Cruz
- Digmala
- Curva (J. Tomacruz)
- Kaingin (Poblacion)
- Labi
- Larcon
- Lusok
- Macabaclay
- Magtanggol (Poblacion)
- Mantile (Poblacion)
- Olivete
- Palo Maria (Poblacion)
- Pesa
- Rizal (Poblacion)
- Sampalucan (Poblacion)
- San Roque (Poblacion)
- Santor
- Sinipit (Poblacion)
- Sisilang na Ligaya (Poblacion)
- Social (Poblacion)
- Tugatug
- Tulay na Bato (Poblacion)
- Vega Grande

=== Climate ===
Climate data for Bongabon, Nueva Ecija
| Month | Jan | Feb | Mar | Apr | May | Jun | Jul | Aug | Sep | Oct | Nov | Dec | Year |
|---|---|---|---|---|---|---|---|---|---|---|---|---|---|
| Mean daily maximum °C (°F) | 29 (84) | 30 (86) | 31 (88) | 33 (91) | 33 (91) | 31 (88) | 30 (86) | 29 (84) | 29 (84) | 30 (86) | 30 (86) | 29 (84) | 30 (87) |
| Mean daily minimum °C (°F) | 19 (66) | 19 (66) | 20 (68) | 22 (72) | 23 (73) | 24 (75) | 24 (75) | 24 (75) | 23 (73) | 22 (72) | 21 (70) | 20 (68) | 22 (71) |
| Average precipitation mm (inches) | 4 (0.2) | 6 (0.2) | 7 (0.3) | 12 (0.5) | 61 (2.4) | 89 (3.5) | 96 (3.8) | 99 (3.9) | 81 (3.2) | 88 (3.5) | 37 (1.5) | 13 (0.5) | 593 (23.5) |
| Average rainy days | 2.5 | 3.0 | 4.1 | 6.3 | 15.8 | 19.4 | 22.5 | 21.6 | 20.1 | 17.5 | 9.6 | 4.0 | 146.4 |
Source: Meteoblue

== Demographics ==
Population census of Bongabon

| Year | Pop. | ±% p.a. |
|---|---|---|
| 1903 | 3,923 | — |
| 1918 | 4,532 | +0.97% |
| 1939 | 11,885 | +4.70% |
| 1948 | 14,958 | +2.59% |
| 1960 | 20,854 | +2.81% |
| 1970 | 25,434 | +2.00% |
| 1975 | 29,932 | +3.32% |
| 1980 | 32,451 | +1.63% |

| Year | Pop. | ±% p.a. |
|---|---|---|
| 1990 | 39,616 | +2.02% |
| 1995 | 44,856 | +2.35% |
| 2000 | 49,255 | +2.03% |
| 2007 | 63,639 | +3.60% |
| 2010 | 59,343 | −2.51% |
| 2015 | 64,173 | +1.50% |
| 2020 | 66,839 | +0.86% |
| 2024 | 69,376 | +0.90% |

Source: Philippine Statistics Authority

=== Religion ===
The majority of the people of the municipality are Roman Catholic. The members of the Iglesia ni Cristo are growing in number and are second to the Catholics in membership. Other sects in the municipality are the Methodists, Iglesia ng Dios, Seventh-day Adventists, etc.

== Economy ==
Poverty incidence of Bongabon (%)

Source: Philippine Statistics Authority

== Tourism ==
- Sibuyas Festival is celebrated as a form of thanksgiving every 10 April, and a way to promote and show their town as one of the largest producers of onion in Asia.
- Ilog Jordan at Barangay Olivete – This place is a popular Lenten destination for people seeking spiritual rejuvenation and healing.
- Falls Deepsap at Barangay Labi – A good place to visit during summer, the falls offers a cold shimmering water perfect to beat heatwaves. Its water comes from the untainted Sierra Madre Mountain.
- Mount Labi Peak at Barangay Labi.
- The first leg of the UCI Gravel World Series was held in Bongabon on April 3, 2022.

== Healthcare ==
Bongabon District Hospital, a government hospital located at Barangay Curva, Bongabon, Nueva Ecija

== Education ==
The Bongabon Schools District Office governs all educational institutions within the municipality. It oversees the management and operations of all private and public, from primary to secondary schools.

=== Primary and elementary schools ===
- Antipolo Elementary School
- Ariendo Elementary School
- Bantug Elementary School
- Bongabon Central School
- Calaanan Elementary School
- Camp Martyr Elementary School
- Cruz Elementary School
- E. Gotangco Elementary School
- E. Pesa Elementary School
- Hiniero Elementary School
- i-Achievers Academy
- J. Tomacruz Elementary School
- Jaime L. Gamilla Elementary School
- Jesus C. Ilagan Elementary School
- Labi Elementary School
- Lusok Elementary School
- Macabaclay Elementary School
- Marian Formation Center
- Olivete Elementary School
- R. Vijandre Elementary School
- Rita De Lara Elementary School
- Rosa A. Ilagan Elementary School
- Santor Elementary School
- St. Francis of Assisi Diocesan School (SFADS)
- Tamale Elementary School
- Vega Elementary School

=== Secondary schools ===
- Bongabon National High School
- Bongabon Senior High School
- Macabaclay National High School
- Santor National High School
- Vega National High School

=== High educational institution ===
- Asia Pacific College of Business and Arts

== Notable personality ==
- JC Alcantara - actor
