= Jay Vergara =

Filipino politician (born 1960)

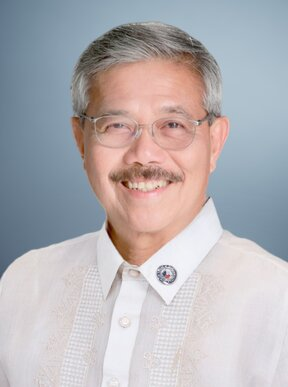
- Official portrait, 2025

Member of the House of Representatives from Nueva Ecija's 3rd district
- Incumbent
- Assumed office June 30, 2025
- Preceded by: Rosanna Vergara

Vice Mayor of Cabanatuan
- In office June 30, 2019 – June 30, 2025
- Mayor: Myca Vergara
- Preceded by: Anthony Umali
- Succeeded by: Joselito Roque

Mayor of Cabanatuan
- In office June 30, 2010 – June 30, 2019
- Vice Mayor: Marius Adriane Garcia (2010–2016); Anthony Umali (2016–2019)
- Preceded by: Alvin Vergara
- Succeeded by: Myca Vergara
- In office June 30, 1998 – June 30, 2007
- Vice Mayor: Raul Mendoza
- Succeeded by: Alvin Vergara

Personal details
- Born: Julius Cesar Vijandre Vergara; January 5, 1960 (age 66) Ermita, Manila, Philippines
- Party: PFP (2024–present)
- Other political affiliations: PDP–Laban (2017–2024); Unang Sigaw (2009–2013); BALANE (2001–2009); Liberal (1998–2017)
- Spouse: Rosanna Vergara
- Children: 3
- Occupation: Politician

Julius Cesar "Jay" Vijandre Vergara (born January 5, 1960) is a Filipino politician. He is currently serving as representative of the 3rd District of Nueva Ecija in the House of Representatives of the Philippines since 2025. He served as vice mayor of Cabanatuan from 2019 to 2025. He also served as mayor of Cabanatuan from 2010 to 2019, a position he previously held from 1998 to 2007.

== Early years ==
Vergara was born on January 5, 1960 in Ermita, Manila, to Cesar Vergara and Evangelina Vijandre.

== Political career ==
=== Mayor of Cabanatuan (1998–2007; 2010–2019) ===
In 1998 elections, Vergara became a mayor of Cabanatuan until 2007. In May 2010, Vergara was elected and returned as mayor of Cabanatuan after he defeated his cousin Alvin Vergara.

=== Vice Mayor of Cabanatuan (2019–2025) ===
In 2019, Vergara was elected as vice mayor of Cabanatuan after his he finished three consecutive terms as mayor.

=== House of Representatives (2025–present) ===
In 2025 elections, Vergara was elected as representative for the third district of Nueva Ecija after he succeeded his wife.

On May 11, 2026, Vergara voted against the second impeachment of Vice President Sara Duterte.

== Personal life ==
Vergara is married to Rosanna Vergara and has three children including Myca Vergara, current mayor of Cabanatuan since 2019.
