= Greater San Fernando del Valle de Catamarca =

Urban agglomeration in Argentina

Greater San Fernando del Valle de Catamarca is an urban agglomeration around the city of San Fernando del Valle de Catamarca in Catamarca Province, Argentina. It has a population of 171,923 inhabitants 2001 census [INDEC], making it the 20th most populous metropolitan area in Argentina.
