= Joson =

Joson is a surname. Notable people with the surname include:

- Eduardo Joson (1919–1990), Filipino captain
- Eduardo Nonato Joson (born 1950), Filipino politician
- Elisse Joson (born 1996), Filipino actress, model, and endorser
- Tomas Joson III (1948–2020), Filipino politician

Given name

- Joson Sanon (born 2005), American basketball player

== See also ==
- Joseon (disambiguation)
