= Bagong Lakas ng Nueva Ecija =

Local political party in Central Luzon

Lapiang Bagong Lakas ng Nueva Ecija
- Chairman: Tomas N. Joson
- Founded: 1987
- Headquarters: Cabanatuan, Nueva Ecija
- Ideology: Conservatism; Social Conservatism; Populism
- Political position: Centre-right
- National affiliation: PDP–Laban
- Colors: Green

The Lapiang Bagong Lakas ng Nueva Ecija (BALANE; New People Power Party of Nueva Ecija) is a provincial political party based in Nueva Ecija, Philippines, which was formerly affiliated with the Nationalist People's Coalition (NPC), then the Kabalikat ng Malayang Pilipino (KAMPI) and finally back to NPC when KAMPI merged with Lakas–CMD to become Lakas–Kampi and the rival party Unang Sigaw became its local affiliate.

There are no results available of the last elections for the House of Representatives, but according to the website of the House, the party holds 1 out of 235 seats (state of the parties, June 2005).

== History ==
In 1987, Lapiang Bagong Lakas ng Nueva Ecija (formally Bagong Lakas ng Nueva Ecija or Balane) was established by Eduardo Joson and later registered with the Commission on Elections, as the newly-ratified Constitution allowed the multi-party system. The suggested acronym is sounded like balani, a Filipino term for "magnet". Joson, who would serve as provincial governor for at least three decades, was replaced earlier in 1986 by Emmanuel Santos as OIC appointed by the Aquino administration.

Among the four candidates fielded by the party for the House of Representatives in the 1987 elections, only Eduardo Nonato Joson, ran for the province's first district, became the first to be elected. In the 1988 local elections, Eduardo Joson defeated Santos and regained the seat.

Other elected candidates were the following:

- Eduardo Nonato "Edno" (Eduardo's son), first district representative, first elected in 1987, also in 2007; governor (1995–98)
- Narciso Nario, vice governor, in 1988
- Tomas III (Eduardo's eldest son), board member (1988–92); acting governor (1990); governor (1992–95, 1998–2007)
- Danding (Eduardo's son), Cabanatuan vice mayor from 1988 until his death in 1990
- Oscar Tinio, vice governor (member of the party until 1995)
- Eduardo IV (Eduardo's son), vice governor, in 1998, re-elected 2001; in 2007, with United Opposition running for third district representative
- Mariano Cristino (Eduardo's son), Quezon mayor, until 1995, in 1998, in 2001 and by 2010; vice governor until 2007
- Josefina Manuel (Mariano Cristino's wife), first district representative, in 1998, in 2001, until 2007 and by 2010
- Edward Thomas (eldest son of Tomas III), senior board member prior to his election as vice governor (2007–2010)
- Rodolfo Antonino, fourth district representative, in 2007
- Rommel Padilla (actor), joined in 2006; provincial board member representing first district (2007–2010)
- Francis Vincent de Leon (son-in-law of Tito Sotto), Talavera vice mayor, in 2007
- Eduardo Rey (Eduardo Nonato's son), elected board member in 2010
- Eduardo Basilio (Mariano Cristino's son), elected Quezon mayor in 2007

Balane was affiliated with the Nationalist People's Coalition and Laban ng Demokratikong Pilipino in the 1995 elections. Prior to this, candidates under Balane–LDP–NPC coalition were substituted following the death of Cabanatuan mayor Honorato Perez, then gubernatorial candidate under Lakas–Laban Coalition, days prior. Provincial governor Tomas III and Quezon mayor Mariano Cristino, both re-electionists implicated in the incident, withdrew their candidacies and were replaced by their brothers, Eduardo Nonato (Edno), then seeking for return as district representative, and Eduardo IV, respectively. Josie Manuel–Joson, wife of Mariano Cristino, then substituted for Edno.

It was allied with Lapian ng Masang Pilipino during the Estrada presidency and the Arroyo administration's Lakas–CMD (Christian Muslim Democrats) in the 2004 elections. It was affiliated with KAMPI in 2007; nine of ten elected provincial board members, as well as half of provincial district representatives, were from the said party. In 2010, later-merged Lakas-Kampi affiliated with another yet rival local party Unang Sigaw Partido ng Pagbabago, both later defeated Balane's standard bearers and claimed almost all the seats in the provincial board, leaving Balane having only two. In 2013, Balane, allied with NPC once again, won a seat in the House of Representatives with the latter's joint endorsement.

Mayors from twenty municipalities and two cities belonging to the party were elected in 2001. Same number of town mayors and three city mayors were elected in 2007.

Josons' half-century governorship ended in 2007 when provincial vice governor Mariano Cristino Joson, then chairperson of the party who ran for the said position, lost to third district representative Aurelio Umali. Umali later defeated the party's standard bearers, another vice governor Edward Thomas Joson (in 2010) and first district representative Josefina Manuel–Joson (in 2013, chairperson by that time). The victory of the Umalis in the provincial level in 2013 effectively ended the Josons' 56-year political rule in the province.

Tomas III was the chairperson of Balane when the clan decided to support the candidacy of former fourth district representative Rodolfo Antonino, ran under the party's ally United Nationalist Alliance, instead of joining the gubernatorial elections in 2016. Antonino lost to third district representative Czarina Umali, wife of Aurelio.

Prior to 2019 elections, former governor Eduardo Nonato Joson resigned from the party. He ran for governor as independent in defiance of his siblings' support for his two other opponents.

In 2022, only five candidates in the province ran under the party, all failed to secure membership in the municipal council of Carranglan.

== Notable party members ==
- Eduardo Rey Gil Joson - Former 1st District Board Member of Sangguniang Panlalawigan ng Nueva Ecija
- Romanito del Rosario Juatco - Former 4th District Board Member of Sangguniang Panlalawigan ng Nueva Ecija
- Rommel Padilla - Former 1st District Board Member of Sangguniang Panlalawigan ng Nueva Ecija
