= Chosan (disambiguation) =

Chosan is:

- Chosan, a county in Chagang province, North Korea
- Chōsan, a morning Dharma meeting in Zen Buddhism
- Chosan-dong, a precinct of Sangju, South Korea

== See also ==
- Joseon (disambiguation), commonly misspelled as "Chosan"
