= Eduardo Nonato Joson =

Filipino lawyer and politician (1950–2025)

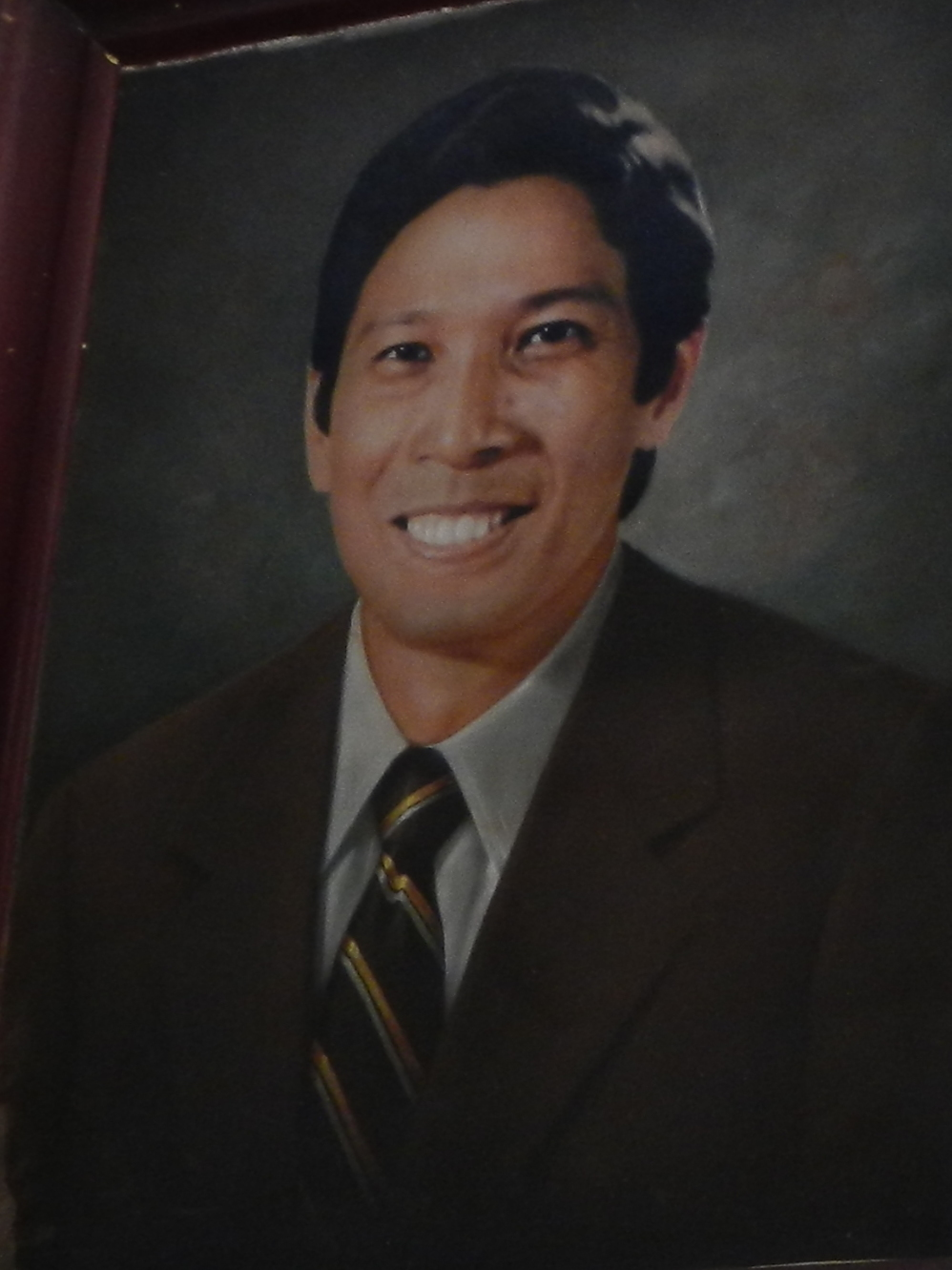
- Joson's portrait at the Nueva Ecija Provincial Capitol, Palayan

Member of the Philippine House of Representatives for Nueva Ecija's 1st district
- In office June 30, 2007 – June 30, 2010
- Preceded by: Josefina Joson
- Succeeded by: Josefina Joson
- In office June 30, 1987 – June 30, 1992
- Preceded by: Leopoldo Diaz
- Succeeded by: Renato Diaz

Administrator of National Food Authority
- In office June 30, 1998 – November 3, 2000
- President: Joseph Estrada
- Succeeded by: Domingo F. Panganiban

28th Governor of Nueva Ecija
- In office June 30, 1995 – June 30, 1998; Suspended: July – September 1997
- Vice Governor: Oscar Tinio
- Preceded by: Tomas Joson III
- Succeeded by: Tomas Joson III

Member of the Regular Batasang Pambansa from Nueva Ecija
- In office June 30, 1984 – March 25, 1986 Serving with Angel Concepcion, Leopoldo Diaz, and Mario Garcia

Personal details
- Born: August 31, 1950 Nueva Ecija, Philippines
- Died: March 12, 2025 (aged 74)
- Party: PDP–Laban (2021–2025); BALANE (local party; 1987–2025)
- Other political affiliations: Independent (2007–2021); Aksyon (2004); NPC (1995–1998); KBL (1984–1987)
- Profession: Lawyer

Eduardo Nonato "Edno" Noriel Joson (August 31, 1950 – March 12, 2025) was a Filipino lawyer and politician who served in the Philippine legislature as assemblyman from Nueva Ecija (1984–1986) and representative of the province's first district (1987–1992 and 2007–2010).

In the local level, he served as provincial governor (1995–1998) wherein he was suspended twice in his tenure.

He also served as administrator of the National Food Authority during the presidency of Joseph Estrada.

He was the second son of former Nueva Ecija Governor Eduardo Joson Sr.

== Background ==
The second son born to his parents, "Edno" was born in Quezon, Nueva Ecija on August 31, 1950, to Eduardo Joson, who became governor of Nueva Ecija, and Araceli Noriel.

Joson married Margaret Rose Gil; they had four children.

His son, Eduardo Rey, was elected member of the province's Sangguniang Panlalawigan in 2010 and 2013, representing the first district. He failed in his attempt for re-election in 2016.

From 2010, he was engaged in rice farming while residing in the municipalities of Guimba and Quezon.

On March 12, 2025, Eduardo died at the age of 74. Bopet Dizon, his son-in-law, served as mayor of Guimba.

== Education ==
While residing in Quezon City, he studied at San Beda College from primary level until he finished Bachelor of Laws.

Pursuing his studies in New York City, he finished Master of Laws (Labor) in New York University in 1983.

He also took Doctor of Laws in the University of Santo Tomas and Master of Arts in Filipino in the University of the Philippines.

== Political career ==
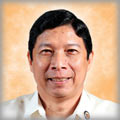
Joson official portrait during the 14th Congress.

He was a parliamentarian in the Regular Batasang Pambansa, representing Nueva Ecija (1984–1986).

In 1987, ran under the local political party Bagong Lakas ng Nueva Ecija (Balane), he was elected representative of the province's first district, serving in the 8th Congress until 1992.

He was an advocate for the propagation of the national language. In his entire congressional career, he used the Filipino language in legislation.

Originally seeking for return as district representative, he replaced his elder brother, Tomas III, ran (Balane–Laban ng Demokratikong Pilipino–Nationalist People's Coalition) and was later elected provincial governor against Virginia Custodio–Perez (of then ruling Lakas–NUCD), who replaced her husband, Cabanatuan mayor Honorato Perez, killed few weeks prior to the 1995 elections in which Tomas III and then Quezon mayor Mariano Cristino were implicated. Following the incident, the latter two, then running for re-election, being charged of double murder, had withdrew their candidacies. Eduardo Nonato served until 1998 as Tomas regained the governorship in that year's elections while in detention; the cases against all the accused were eventually dismissed.

As provincial governor, he started projects in the barangays focusing on peace and order, medical services, and serving indigents and the homeless; initiated training, especially for disaster response, to enhance public service; and created an office to handle investments. He expanded college scholarship and clean and green programs.

In 1996, Edno reportedly raided the session hall of the provincial board to confront vice governor Oscar Tinio (Lakas–NUCD) and his allies for reportedly not acting on a loan being sought by the provincial government. He was later charged of grave misconduct and abuse of authority through a complaint filed by some board members. As a result, he was suspended twice by Executive Secretary Ruben Torres. On July 11, 1997, an order was issued giving him a 60-day preventive suspension. On January 8, 1998, he was found guilty of the offenses and a six-month suspension was imposed, which he defied as the provincial capitol compound was cordoned off until the authorities hastily and peacefully retreat; the Supreme Court in May declared the said order null and void. Tinio was then designated by the Interior Secretary Robert Barbers to assume the governorship.

Joson was designated as administrator of the National Food Authority during the presidency of Joseph Estrada. He resigned in November 2000, few months before the end of the administration. He made efforts to lower prices for basic commodities through rolling and sari-sari stores. He initiated seedling and fertilizer subsidy to farmers; establishment of post-harvest facilities and equipment; and introduced electronic system of trading in agriculture.

In 2004, Edno ran for senator under the ticket (Aksyon Demokratiko) of presidential candidate Raul Roco.

Joson, ran under Balane–KAMPI coalition, was elected again as district representative (2007–2010) and did not seek re-election thereafter. Among his proposed bills in the 14th Congress include: establishment of the Civil Aviation Authority of the Philippines (Republic Act No. 9497); strengthening the University of the Philippines as the premier state university (RA No. 9500); strengthening programs to micro, small and medium scale enterprises (RA No. 9501; amending RA No. 6977, the Magna Carta for Small Enterprises); and provision for cheaper medicines (RA No. 9502); all enacted in 2008.

Ran independent in the 2019 elections, he failed in his attempt to regain the governorship.

=== 2022 elections ===
Edno, ran under PDP–Laban, lost to his younger brother and re-electionist mayor of Quezon, Mariano Cristino (Boyet), in the 2022 elections.

A week after he filed his candidacy, a petition for its cancellation was filed by his lone mayoralty opponent. Mariano accused Edno of misrepresenting himself by claiming to have been a Quezon resident since birth for him to run in the said election. The petition claimed that he is a Guimba resident since 2000 and had long abandoned his place of birth as he had never owned a property there, citing affidavit issued by their mother and other documents.

In January 2022, the Commission on Elections First Division granted the said petition; ruling that there is insufficient information to establish that he is able to comply with the residency requirement.

Denying the accusations, he insisted that there is no law requiring someone to own property to establish one's domicile. He was about to raise the said decision to the Supreme Court, as a municipal trial court had approved his petition for inclusion in the voters' list of Quezon.
