= International Academy of Management and Economics =

Private educational institution in Makati, Philippines

- Former names: International University Foundation
- Type: Private business school, Non-sectarian
- Established: 1985
- President: Emmanuel T. Santos, LL.B., M.B.A., Ph.D.
- Location: San Antonio Village, Makati, Philippines
- Website: Recent website

International Academy of Management and Economics or IAME is a private, non-sectarian, degree-granting educational institution, primarily focused on business courses, in Makati, Philippines.

== History ==
In 1979, IAME's precursor was established under the name International University Foundation. It was founded by lawyer and educator Emmanuel T. Santos, PhD.

The first batch of graduates held ceremonies in Hotel Miramar in Hong Kong in 1982.

In 1985, IAME was accredited as a local institution by the Commission on Higher Education (CHED) of the Philippines.

On March 21, 2003, IAME became the first Makati-based business school to fulfill the requirements of ISO 9001:2000 for establishing a Quality Management System for the Provision of Higher Education in Management, specifically for the design, delivery, and testing of business courses, and overall facilities' management.

== Academics ==
IAME provides undergraduate and graduate programs in management. Degrees/diplomas issued by IAME before 2012 have full CHED accreditation, CHED accreditation also covers students enrolled at the time of the CHED decision. Since then, IAME has been issuing degrees citing "accreditation" from World Education Services, a New York-based degree equivalency assessment firm. It also opened Senior High School in compliance to K-12.

- Diploma in Management
- International Bachelor of Business Administration / Business Management
- International Master of Business Administration / Technology Management / International Management
- International Doctor of Philosophy in Management

=== Controversy ===
In February 2012, CHED ordered the closure of three IAME programs—Bachelor of Science in Business Administration (BSBA); Master in Business Administration (MBA) and Philosophy in Management (Ph.D. Management)--due to substandard quality. In July 2012, the Philippines Supreme Court upheld CHED's decision.

In August 2012, CHED cautioned prospective students from enrolling at IAME in connection to its closure order. IAME reportedly moved its operations to Hong Kong and released a statement stating that it is "beyond the jurisdiction of the Republic of the Philippines."

In May 2014, IAME stated that it has obtained a Temporary Restraining Order from a Makati Court against CHED's closure of the pertinent programs.

== Management ==
IAME was owned and managed by its founder, chairman and chief executive officer, Dr. Emmanuel T. Santos.

== Facilities ==
IAME is located in Makati with a business library, an IT resource center, a publishing house, an auditorium, a gym, executive conference suites, and a restaurant. IAME was housed in a four-storey mother building with a European Facade and a castle-like lobby and stairway.
