= Tomas Joson III =

Filipino politician (1948–2020)

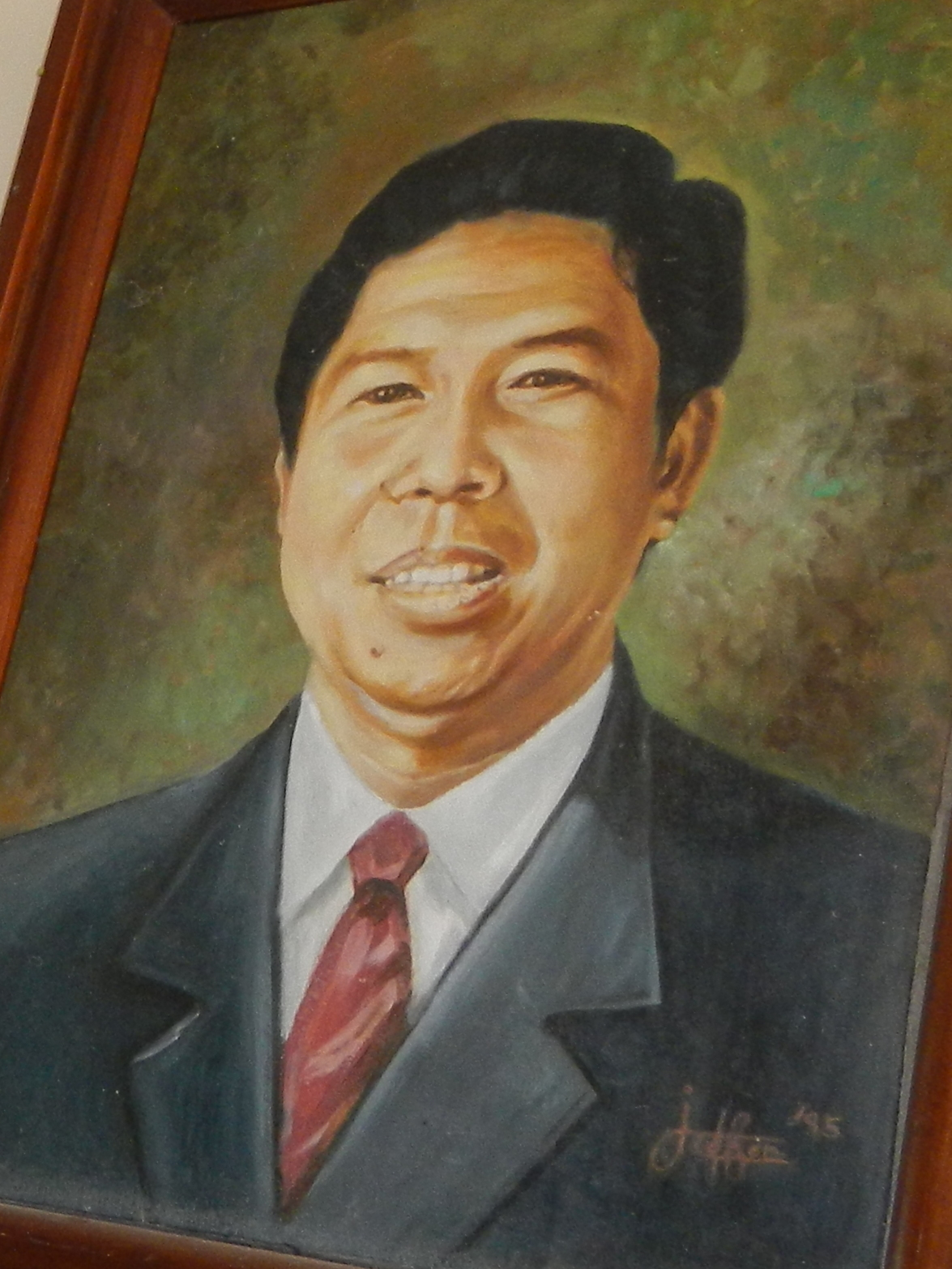
- Tomas Joson's III portrait at the Nueva Ecija Provincial Capitol, Palayan City

30th and 33rd Governor of Nueva Ecija
- In office June 30, 1998 – June 30, 2007
- Vice Governor: Eduardo Joson IV (1998–2004); Mariano Cristino Joson (2004–2007)
- Preceded by: Eduardo Nonato Joson
- Succeeded by: Aurelio Umali
- In office June 30, 1992 – June 30, 1995
- Vice Governor: Oscar Tinio
- Preceded by: Narciso S. Nario Sr.
- Succeeded by: Eduardo Nonato Joson

Personal details
- Born: Tomas Noriel Joson; May 10, 1948 Santo Domingo, Nueva Ecija, Philippines
- Died: July 23, 2020 (aged 72) Cabanatuan, Philippines
- Party: BALANE (1992–2020)
- Other political affiliations: NPC (1992–2007)
- Spouse: Mary Ann Filart Joson
- Children: 5
- Education: San Beda College of Law
- Occupation: Lawyer, Businessman, Politician

Tomas Noriel Joson III (May 10, 1948 – July 23, 2020) was a Filipino politician. He served as a Governor of Nueva Ecija, Philippines for one term from 1992 to 1995, and was re-elected for another three terms from 1998 to 2007.

In 2019, Joson was found guilty of three counts of graft over donated vehicles to the towns of Quezon and Bongabon in 2007, and sentenced to between six and ten years' imprisonment for each count.

In 2020, Joson was acquitted.

== Life ==
=== Early life ===
"Tommy", the eldest son of Eduardo Joson of Quezon, Nueva Ecija, a former guerilla officer who later served as provincial governor, and Araceli Noriel, was born on May 10, 1948, in Santo Domingo.

He studied at Quezon Elementary School and San Beda College in his early years. He later finished Bachelor of Arts and Master of Arts in Economics in the University of the Philippines.

He worked as private secretary in the governor's office in the 1970s.

=== Political career ===
He was a member of the provincial board since 1980 and became vice governor. He served as provincial governor, first in acting capacity (1989–1990), and later being elected (1992–1995, 1998–2007).

Tomas III, then senior board member, took his oath as acting governor on December 19, 1989, as vice governor Narciso Nario "waived his right" to assume that position. Nario had taken over as acting governor pursuant to the Local Government Code (Batas Pambansa Blg. 337) when governor Eduardo took a sick leave on December 7, temporarily vacating his office.

On December 23, Tomas took his oath of office as vice governor. A day prior, Nario voluntarily resigned due to his health concerns, only to withdraw it eleven days later as his condition turned out to be not serious. Tomas' functions were ordered discontinued on January 3, 1990, by Local Government Secretary Luis Santos who, considered Nario as the vice governor, designated him again as acting governor.

The Cabanatuan Regional Trial Court later decided in favor of Santos and Nario, which would be affirmed by the Supreme Court in July. Later that year, Tomas III eventually became vice governor following the death of his father which was succeeded then by Nario.

As governor, he initiated the "Nueva Ecija 2000", supporting programs including on agriculture through establishing a provincial fruits and vegetable seed center.

During his term, the Nueva Ecija Federation of Dairy Carabao Cooperatives was established, which boosted the province's dairy industry and helped to address malnutrition.

He implemented backyard tilapia production.

In his last years in office, he transferred the provincial seat of government to Palayan wherein infrastructures were constructed including a sports complex, a provincial convention center, and a college named in his father's memory.

Joson was defeated in Cabanatuan mayoralty election in 2007.

Joson was the chairperson of his family's Bagong Lakas ng Nueva Ecija (Balane) when he nominated former fourth district representative Rodolfo Antonino as the party's candidate in the 2016 gubernatorial elections; the family decided to support the latter's candidacy as they did not join for the first time in 56 years.

=== Controversies ===
Tomas III, his younger brother Mariano Cristino, and two others were implicated in an alleged raid in a provincial jail in April 1990 wherein a prison guard who is a Constabulary enlisted man was killed in a shootout between the two, along with their bodyguards, and Quibuyen family members. Though the Josons were charged with the death, no arrest warrant was issued.

The two were charged as principal suspects in the ambush of Tomas' gubernatorial rival, then Cabanatuan mayor Honorato Perez Sr. of the administration's Lakas–NUCD, who was shot dead along with his bodyguard in Talavera on April 22, 1995. They were detained since then along with other co-accused. (Note: Also accused were their 13 bodyguards consisting of twelve policemen and a marine soldier. Other reports stated seven and twelve.)

Tomas III and Mariano Cristino ("Boyet"), then mayor of Quezon, both re-electionists under Balane–Laban ng Demokratikong Pilipino–Nationalist People's Coalition, later withdrew their candidacies. Their brother, former first district representative Eduardo Nonato ("Edno") who is then seeking for his return, substituted for Tomas III and defeated Perez's widow; another, Eduardo, replaced Boyet. On the other hand, Josie replaced Edno in the congressional elections.

The Supreme Court ordered the transfer of the case (from Talavera RTC Branch 88 to Pasig RTC Branch 166) and their detention (from provincial police headquarters in Cabanatuan to police custodial facility at Camp Crame in Quezon City). In 1998, while in detention, Tomas III and Mariano Cristino ran and were elected governor, against Perez's widow, and Quezon mayor respectively. In 1999, the court dismissed the murder charges against all accused for lack of evidence. Tomas III would be re-elected twice; Mariano Cristino, only once.

In April 2018, the Supreme Court decided to exclude Tomas III from liability in relation to alleged irregular award of ₱155 million to a private contractor for the construction of a hotel in the province. The case originated from the findings of the Commission on Audit in 2007 on selected transactions of the provincial government from 2004 to 2007.

In July 2019, Tomas III, as well as former mayors of Quezon (his nephew, Eduardo Basilio) and Bongabon, were convicted by the Sandiganbayan of three counts of graft and was to serve at least 18 years in jail, in relation to his donation of service vehicles to these municipalities in 2007, which found violated the Local Government Code. In early 2020, the court's Special 7th Division, granting their appeal, voted to reverse the decision.

=== Personal life and death ===
He married Mary Ann Filart; they had five sons.

His eldest son, Edward Thomas, was a provincial board member prior to becoming provincial vice governor (ran under Balane–KAMPI coalition) in 2007. He was elected again to the provincial board, representing third district, in 2016 He was defeated twice by Aurelio Umali, in 2001 congressional elections in the third district and 2010 gubernatorial elections; as well as twice by Anthony, brother of Aurelio, in his attempts to regain vice governorship in 2019 and in 2022 elections.

Joson died on July 23, 2020, aged 72. He was later interred at Loyola Memorial Park in Marikina.

== Gallery ==
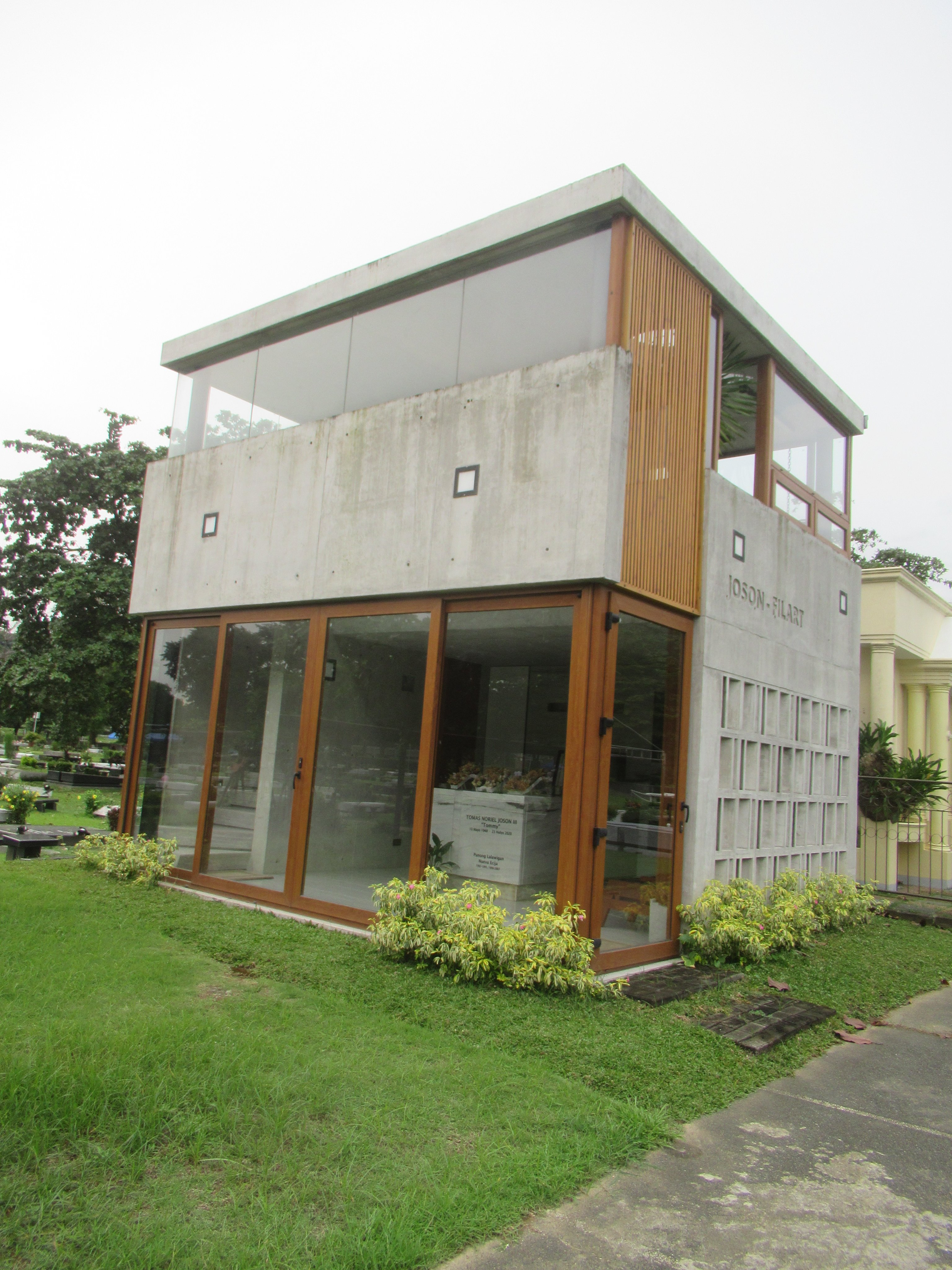
Joson III mausoleum

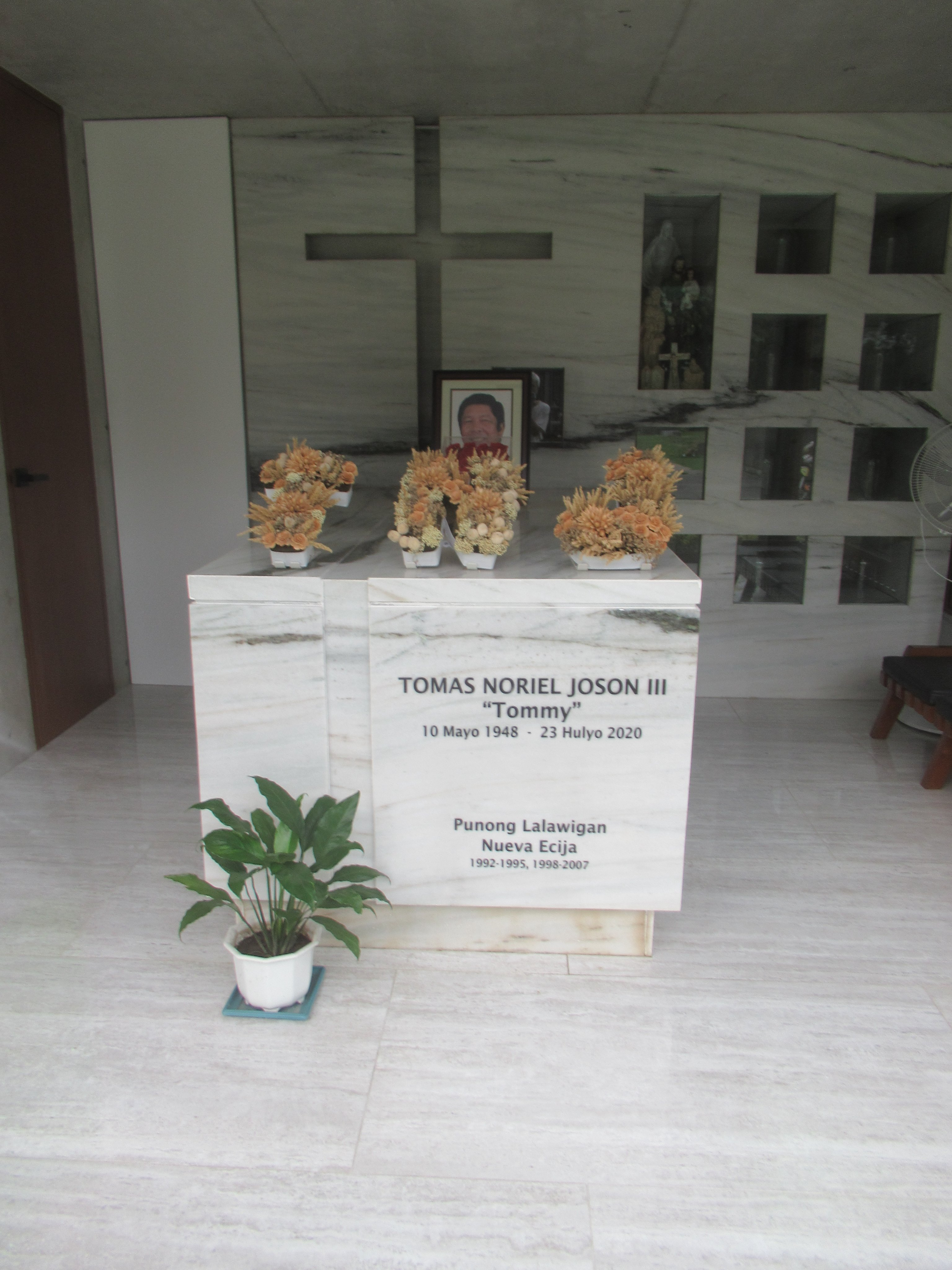
Loyola Memorial Park tomb
