= Eduardo Joson =

Filipino politician (1919–1990)

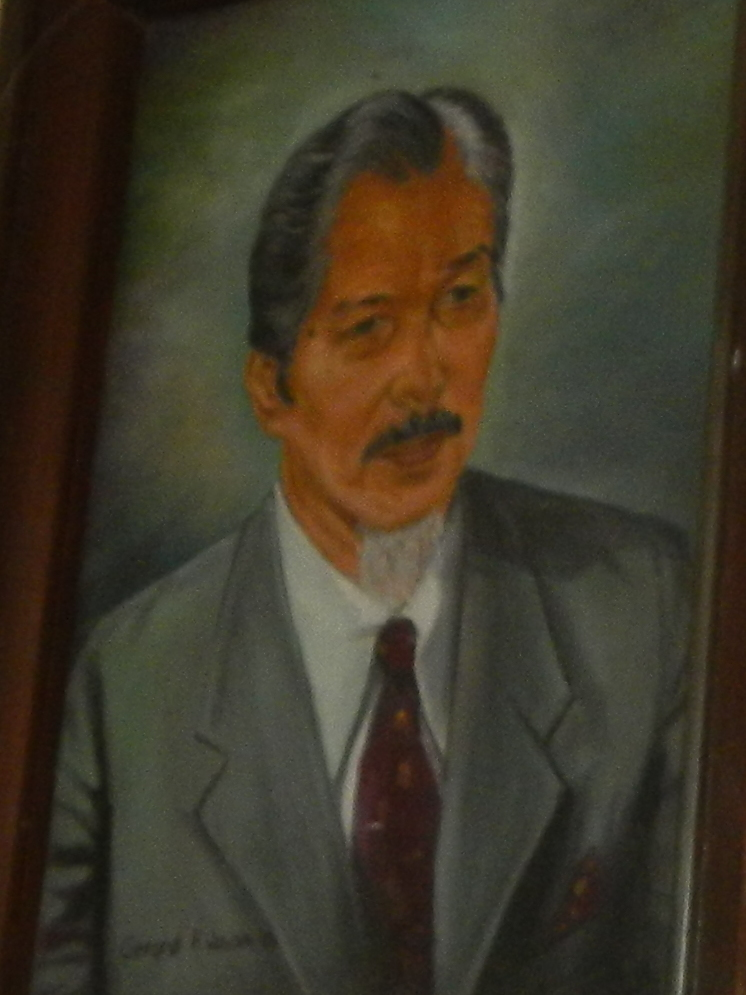
- Official Portrait of Governor Eduardo L. Joson

26th and 28th Governor of Nueva Ecija
- In office December 30, 1959 – 1986
- Vice Governor: Arturo B. Pascual (1959–1967); Policarpio Sta. Romana (1967–1976); Vacant (1976–1980); Loreto Pangilinan (1980–1986)
- Preceded by: Amado Aleta
- Succeeded by: Emmanuel T. Santos
- In office June 30, 1988 – August 9, 1990
- Vice Governor: Narciso S. Nario Sr.
- Preceded by: Emmanuel T. Santos
- Succeeded by: Narciso S. Nario Sr.

Mayor of Quezon, Nueva Ecija
- In office December 30, 1947 – December 30, 1959

Personal details
- Born: August 5, 1919 Quezon, Nueva Ecija, Philippine Islands
- Died: August 9, 1990 (aged 71) Makati City, Philippines
- Party: BALANE (1987–1990)
- Other political affiliations: KBL (1980–1987); Liberal (until 1980)
- Spouse: Araceli Noriel
- Children: 6, including Tomas III and Eduardo Nonato
- Occupation: Politician

Military service
- Allegiance: Philippines; United States
- Branch/service: United States Army
- Years of service: 1941–1945
- Rank: Captain
- Unit: USAFFE
- Commands: Squadron 213
- Battles/wars: World War II: Raid at Cabanatuan (1945)

Eduardo "Tatang" Lopez Joson Sr. (August 5, 1919 – August 9, 1990) was a Filipino military officer and politician. He was a captain of Filipino guerrillas during the Japanese occupation of the Philippines during World War II. He later became the mayor of Quezon, Nueva Ecija and eventually the governor of Nueva Ecija in a span of 31 years until his death in 1990, making him the second longest serving politician serving one government position in the country.

During his governorship, he founded a local political party, Bagong Lakas ng Nueva Ecija.

== World War II ==
Joson was a guerrilla fighter during World War II. He served with anti-Japanese forces; he was recognized as a war hero for his leadership and his participation as a Filipino guerilla captain in a successful raid in a Japanese POW camp called Camp Pangatian in Cabanatuan, Nueva Ecija in January 1945 wherein American prisoners of war were rescued.

Joson was the captain of Squadron 213 of Robert Lapham's guerrilla fighters in the Philippines. Along with Captain Juan Pajota, they led the Philippine guerillas during the raid supporting the Alamo Scouts, the largest rescue of POWs in US military history.

== Political career ==
Joson's political career began when he dropped out of law school to run for mayor of Quezon, Nueva Ecija in 1947 and served until 1959. He was elected governor of Nueva Ecija on that year and was re-elected in five succeeding elections. He served almost continuously until his death; in 1986, he was ousted in the aftermath of the People Power Revolution.

Being called "Tatang", as governor, he was known by constituents whom he helped through certain acts, which included paying for the delivery of infants, as well as free medicine, coffins, hospitalization and scholarships to those in need.

Joson was a member of Kilusang Bagong Lipunan party of President Ferdinand Marcos, who at once apparently united him and his rival, Cabanatuan mayor Honorato Perez. However, both never reconciled and left the party after Marcos' ouster.

In 1986, Joson was replaced by Emmanuel Santos as OIC governor appointed by the Aquino administration. The following year, he established his own regional political party, Bagong Lakas ng Nueva Ecija (Balane). Running under the said party in 1988, Joson regained his seat after defeating Santos.

== Later life and death ==
Joson suffered a heart attack in December 1989. On December 7, he temporarily vacated his office through a sick leave. Vice governor Narciso Nario and senior board member Tomas Joson III took over as acting governors. This became controversial when Tomas briefly succeeded Nario, who then left vice governorship due to health issues until being reinstalled by the Local Government Secretary and designated again as acting governor.

Joson died on August 9, 1990 at age 71. He was buried in the municipal cemetery of Quezon.

== Personal life ==
Joson was married to Araceli Santos Noriel, the granddaughter of Mariano Noriel and they had six children. All five sons held elected office, including:

- Tomas III (eldest): board member in the 1980s; vice governor (1989– 1990, 1990); governor (1989–1990; 1992–1995, 1998–2007);
- Eduardo Nonato (Edno; second son): provincial assemblyman, Batasang Pambansa (1984-1986); representative of the province's first legislative district (elected 1988, 2007–2010); governor (1995–1998); and administrator of the National Food Authority during the Estrada administration.

== See also ==
- Raid at Cabanatuan
- The Great Raid
