= Emmanuel T. Santos =

Filipino politician (1938–2020)

Emmannuel T. Santos
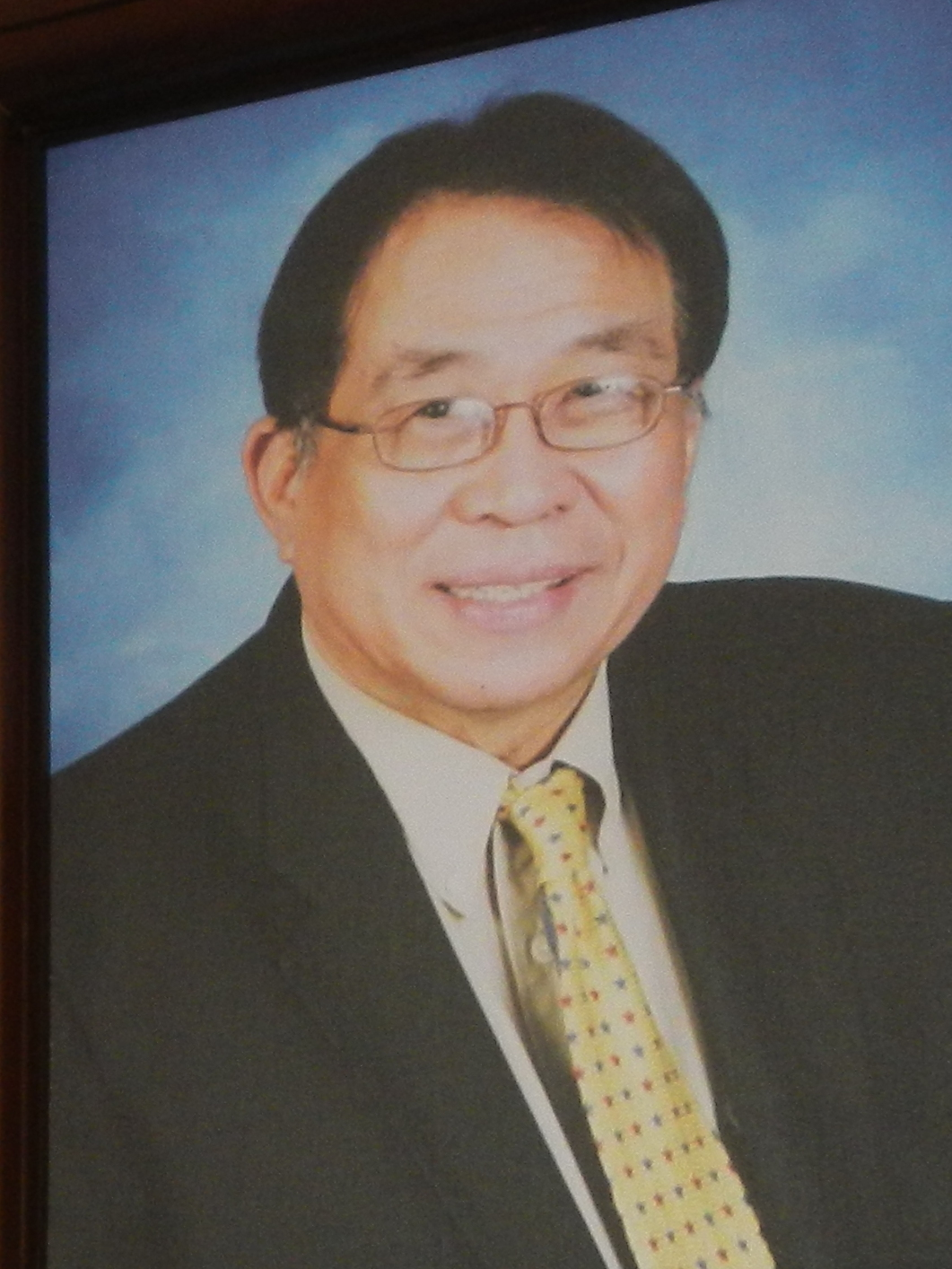
- Emmanuel Santos' portrait at the Nueva Ecija Provincial Capitol in Palayan City

27th Governor of Nueva Ecija
- In office 1986–1987
- Preceded by: Eduardo Joson
- Succeeded by: Eduardo Joson

Personal details
- Born: January 26, 1938 Cabanatuan, Nueva Ecija, Philippine Commonwealth
- Died: June 1, 2020 (aged 82)
- Occupation: Politician
- Profession: Lawyer

Emmanuel Tiu Santos (January 26, 1938 – June 1, 2020), also known as Noli Santos, was a lawyer, politician, management practitioner, and educator in the Philippines. He was a delegate to the 1971 Constitutional Convention which drafted the 1973 Philippine Constitution. He also served as the Governor of Nueva Ecija from 1986 to 1987, as well as president of the Philippine British Society (PBS).

Santos died on June 1, 2020, at the age of 82.

== Private sector ==
Santos has been the chairman and chief executive officer of Intercontinental Broadcasting Company (IBC), and vice president and member of the board of directors of the Manufacturer's Bank. He was the founding president, chairman, and chief executive officer of the International Academy of Management and Economics, a business school in Makati; and the International University Foundation Montessori Learning Center, Inc., a basic education provider, located in Meycauayan, Bulacan; and International Montessori School in Santa Rosa, Laguna and Marikina. He also became the Chairman Emeritus of International Academy of Management and Economics (I/AME) and the founding chairman and president of the Euro-American-Philippine Credit Corporation.

He was co-founder of the Chamber of Philippine Department Stores which he advised to launch the Mother's Day in May and Father's Day in June of every year, following American practice. These days are now popularly observed in the Philippines.

He was the chairman-CEO of the IAME Institute of Strategic and International Studies which co-publishes the IAME Journal of Management, Law and Economics.

He was the president emeritus of the Philippine Council of Management (Philcoman), the oldest management association of the Philippines and president emeritus of Philippine Association of Voluntary Arbitrators (NCR).

He was the producer-host of Public Policy Forum, which aired its first season on ANC in 2005. He was also the producer-host of U-TV, the first open university on television in the field of Management aired over RPN in the mid-1990s.

== Government ==
Santos was elected as a delegate to the 1971 Constitutional Convention, a group tasked to draft the 1973 Philippine Constitution. He was a principal sponsor of provisions on social and economic rights, civil and political rights, and anti-corruption provisions. More specifically he sponsored the right of the people to information, right to travel, the right to counsel, right against detention incommunicado; the right to free education, social services, health and housing; and the Ombudsman as defender of citizen's rights, which are carried over to the 1987 Constitution of the Philippines.(See Records of Proceedings of 1971 Constitutional Convention and 1986 Constitutional Commission.)

He was appointed by then Philippine President Corazon Aquino to serve as Officer-in-Charge Governor of Nueva Ecija. In this capacity, he was elected as chairman of the Regional Development Council of Central Luzon, and secretary-general of the League of Governors and City Mayors of the Philippines. (See Official Records, Office of the President of the Philippines.)

He was co-founder with Ninoy Aquino of Lakas ng Bayan during the darkest days of martial rule in 1978 to re-awaken the democratic spirit of the Filipino people and restore democracy. He was the one assigned by Ninoy Aquino to announce to the people of Metro Manila with his four-directional speakers atop his car to stage a Noise Barrage on April 6, 1978. This event was called by Alejandro Roces in his column in the Philippine Star and by Napoleon Rama in his editorial in Panorama magazine of the Sunday Bulletin as "the embryo of the 1986 People Power Revolution" (the First EDSA). Santos called the Noise Barrage of 1978 in his column in People's Journal as "The First Cry of the People Power Revolution of 1986. On 2 October 2009, Santos established the Lakas ng Bayan 2G (Laban!2G) to produce a generation of young transformational leaders through a certification course to be offered by IAME Institute of Political Education, Leadership and Good Governance.

== Academe ==
Santos has taught as a professorial lecturer at the University of the Philippines College of Business Administration, University of the Philippines Institute of Small-Scale Industries, University of the Philippines Law Center, University of the East College of Business Administration, University of the East Graduate School, Ateneo Graduate School of Business, and the University of Santo Tomas Graduate School.

Santos was the chairman and chief executive officer of the International Academy of Management and Economics (IAME), a business school in Makati, Philippines.

== Publications ==
Santos has authored the following academic textbooks:

- Organization and Management
- Corporate Governance:Concepts, Values and Practices
- Practices, Concepts, and Principles of Management
- Human Resource Management (co-author)
- Strategic Planning:Concepts, Processes, Issues (co-author)
- The Philippine Business Laws
- The Constitution of the Philippines: Notes and Comments
- Obligation and Contract
- Taxation: Concepts, Principles, Practices, and Trends (co-author)

He ran a weekly column in the People's Tonight and "People's Journal", and was a contributor of The Law and You of Bulletin Today, Ikaw at ang Batas of Liwayway Magazine, Cultural Notes of Variety Magazine of the Chino Roces "Manila Times", and Nueva Ecija Harvest of the Manila Chronicle.(See Archives of above-mentioned publications.)

== Death ==
Santos died on June 1, 2020.
