= Joseon (disambiguation) =

Chinese name
- Traditional Chinese: 朝鮮
- Simplified Chinese: 朝鲜
Transcriptions
Standard Mandarin
- Hanyu Pinyin: Cháoxiǎn
- Bopomofo: ㄔㄠˊㄒㄧㄢ
Yue: Cantonese
- Jyutping: ciu4 sin1
Southern Min
- Hokkien POJ: Tiâu-sián

Vietnamese name
- Vietnamese alphabet: Triều Tiên
- Chữ Hán: 朝鮮

Korean name
- Hangul: 조선
- Hanja: 朝鮮
Transcriptions
- Revised Romanization: Joseon
- McCune–Reischauer: Chosŏn

Japanese name
- Kanji: 朝鮮
- Kana: ちょうせん
Transcriptions
- Romanization: Chōsen

Joseon was a Korean kingdom between 1392 and 1897.

The word is also spelled Josŏn, Chosŏn, Choseon, Chosun, Chōsen (romanization of Japanese pronunciation), or Cháoxiǎn (Chinese).

Depending on the context, the word may refer to parts of the Korean peninsula, the entire Korean peninsula, or certain historical Korean states:

- The Democratic People's Republic of Korea, which still refers to itself as Chosŏn or Joseon
- Korea, because the entire peninsula is referred to as 'Joseon' by some groups of people, including North Koreans, some Chinese, and Japanese Koreans
- Old Chosŏn, an ancient Korean kingdom that originally went by the name Joseon, which existed until 108 BCE
- Korea under Japanese rule, which went by the name Chōsen
- Joseon Cybernation, a crypto-based digital monarchy that claims descent from the historical kingdom in Korea

== Usage in other terms ==
- The Chosun Ilbo, a major South Korean newspaper
  - TV Chosun, a South Korean pay television network and broadcasting company under Chosun Ilbo
- Choson Sinbo, a pro-North Korean Japanese newspaper
- Chosun University, a South Korean university
- Koreans in China, who are sometimes called "Joseonjok", "Chosŏnjok", or "Chaoxianzu"
- The Anti–South Korean slur "Chōsenjin" and its derivative "Josenjing" both reference Joseon

== See also ==
- Names of Korea
