= Quezon, Nueva Ecija =

Municipality in Nueva Ecija, Philippines

Quezon
- Municipality
- Municipality of Quezon
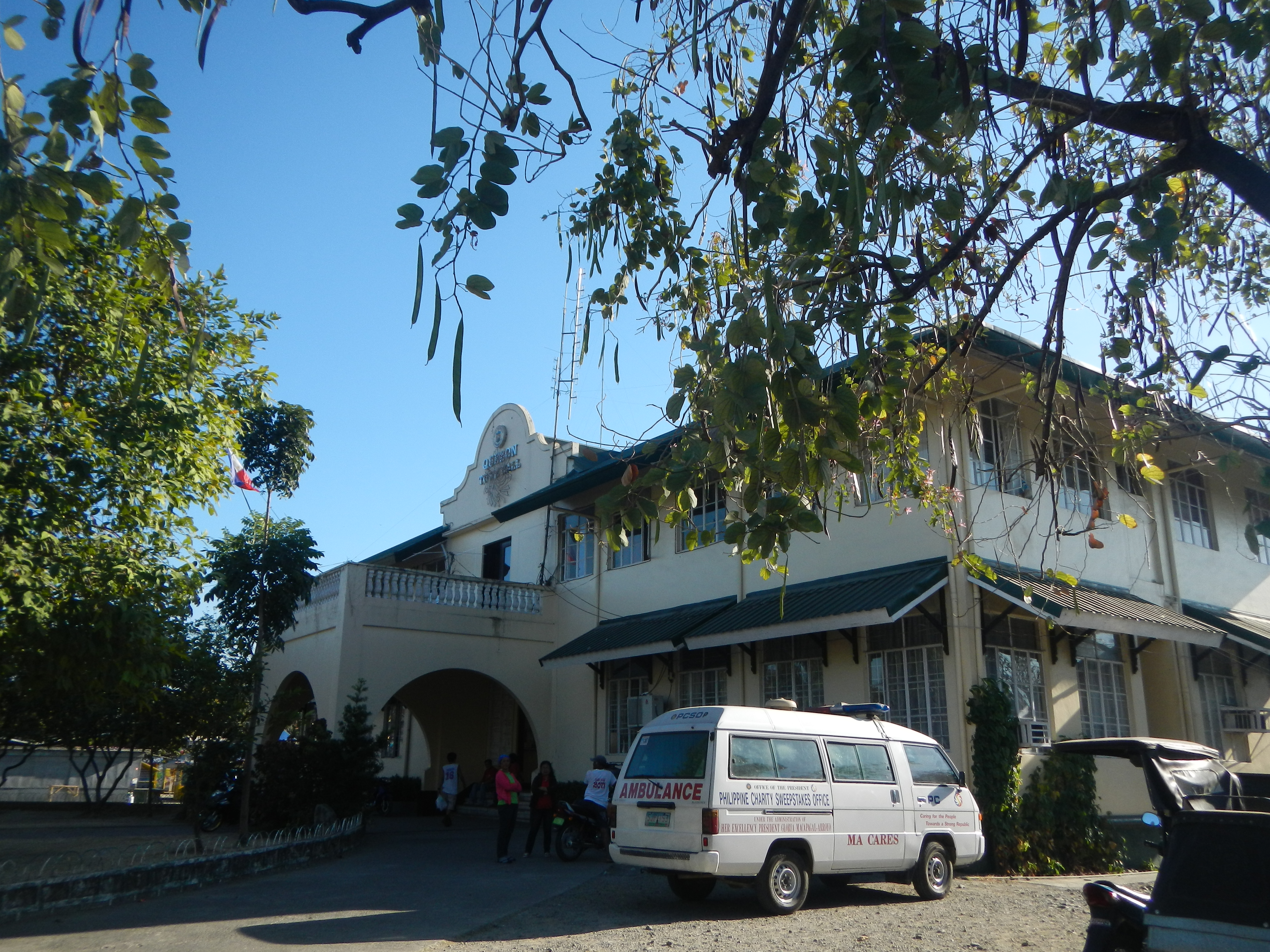
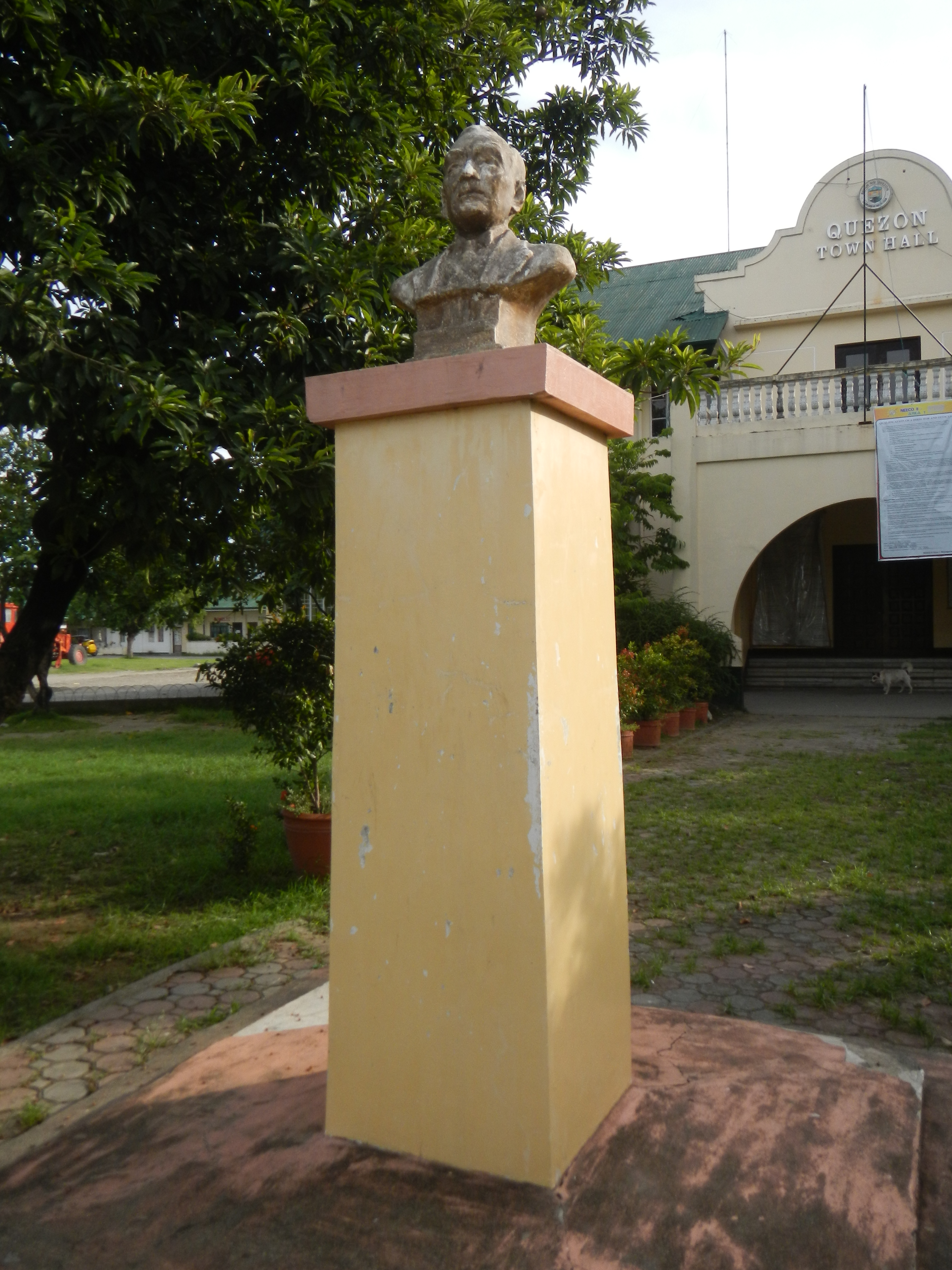
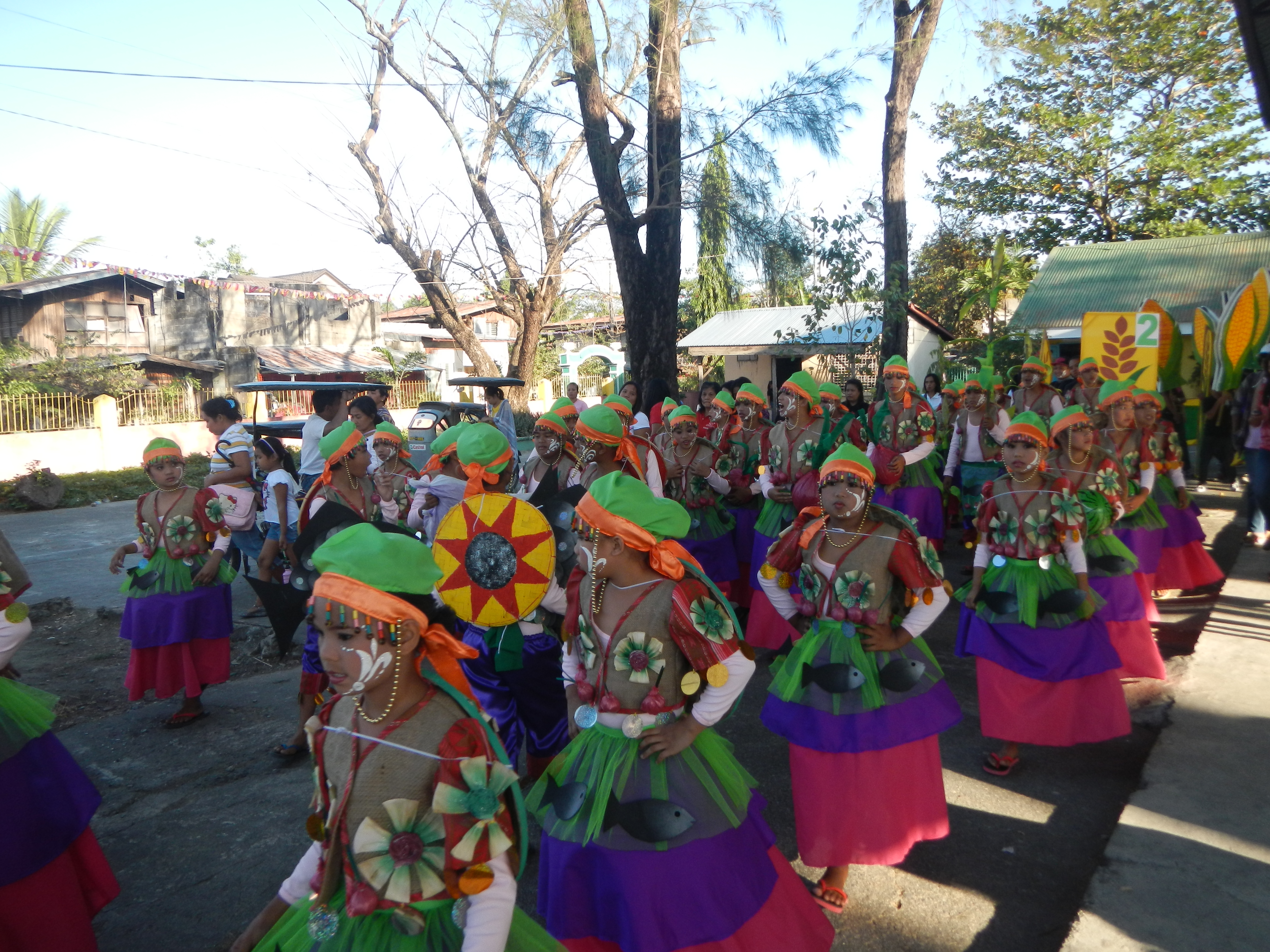
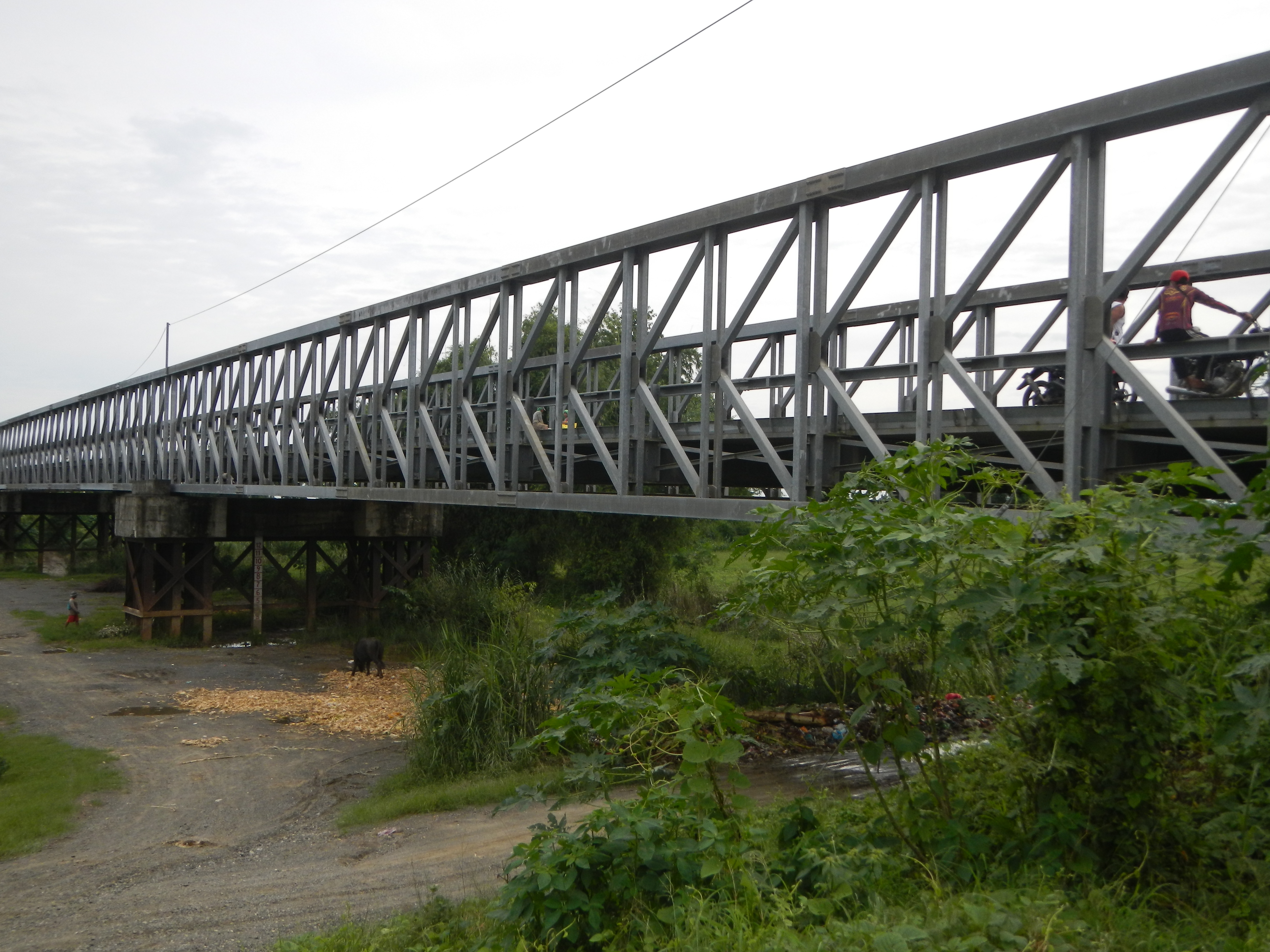
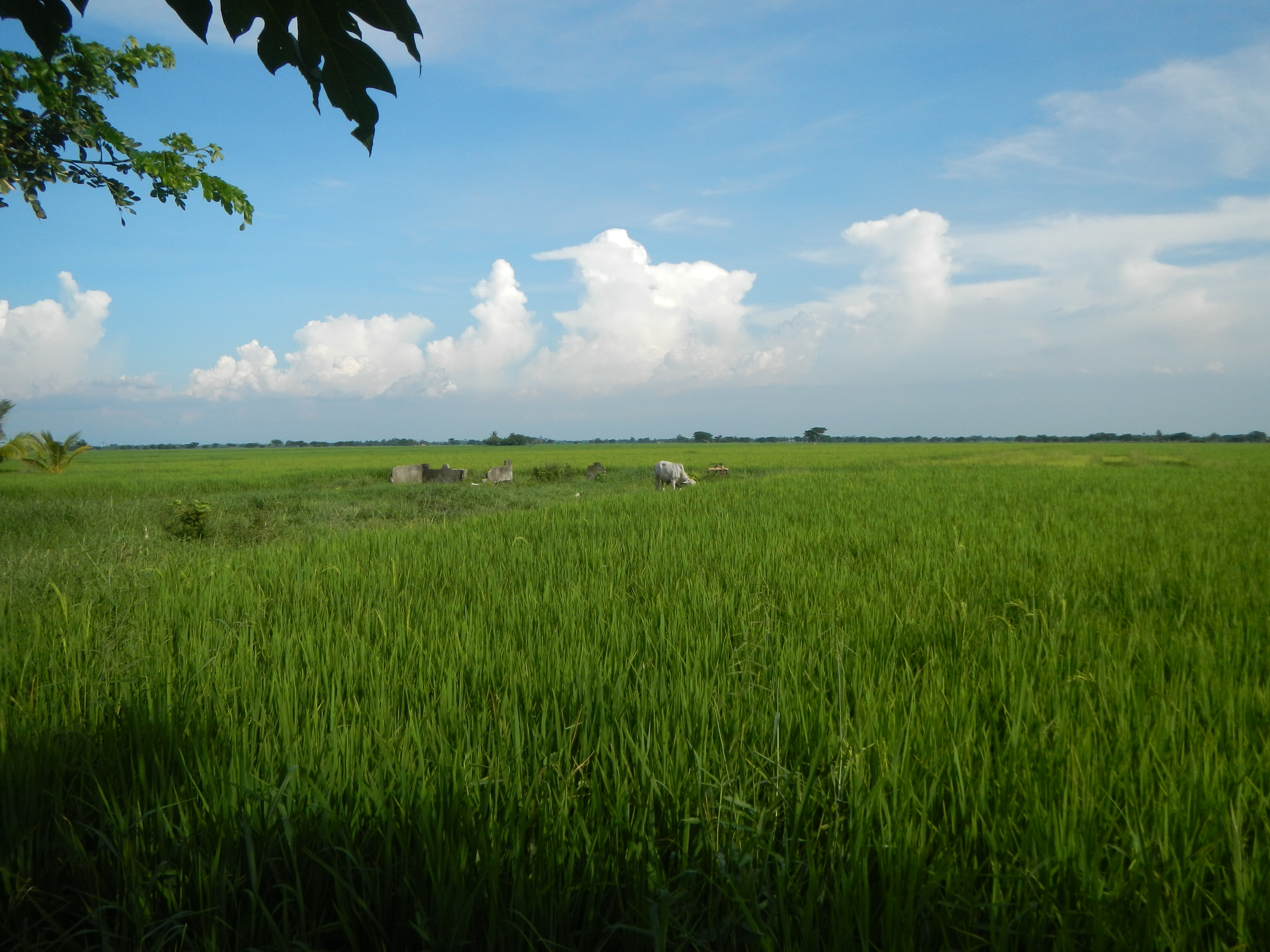
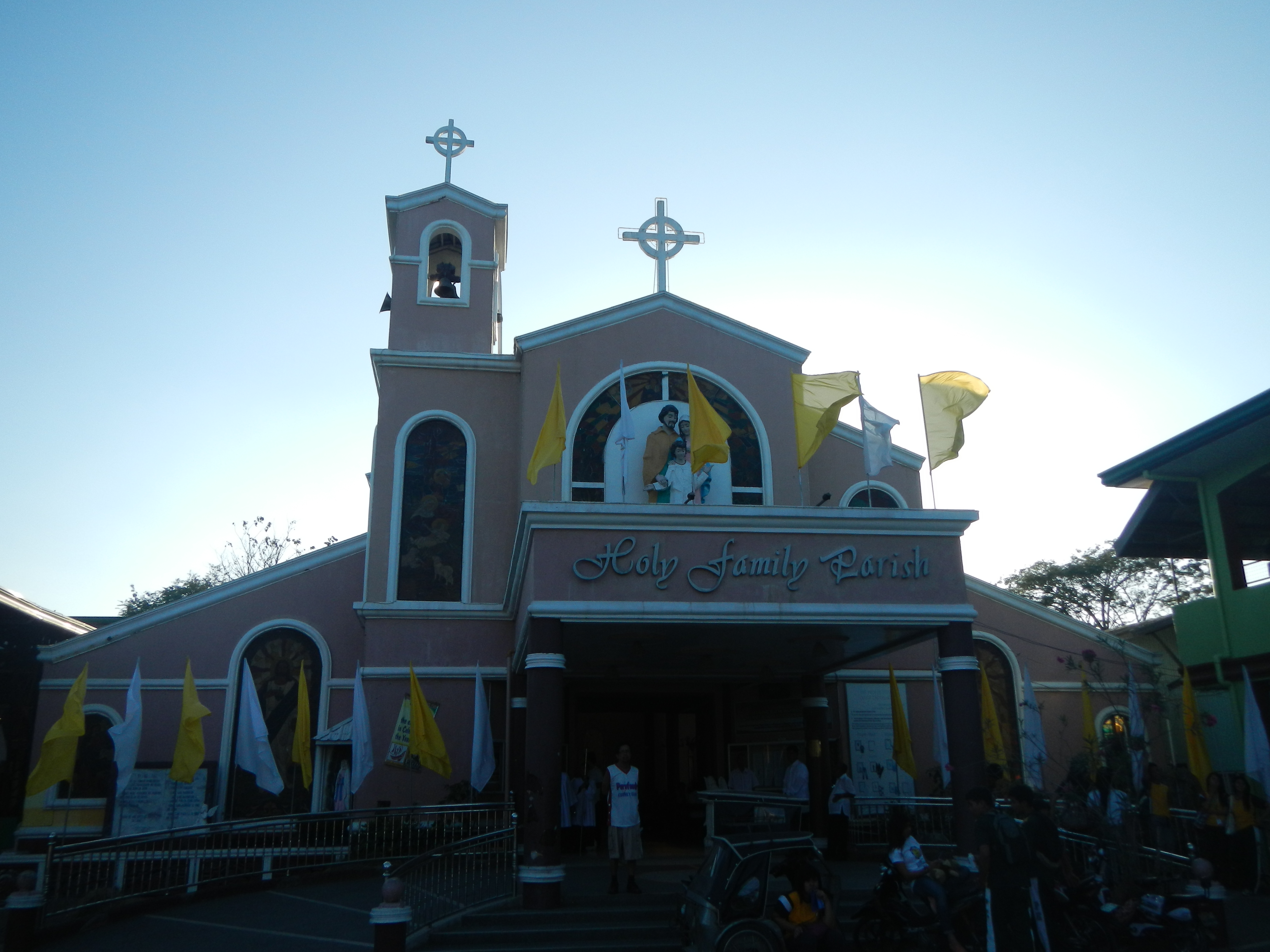
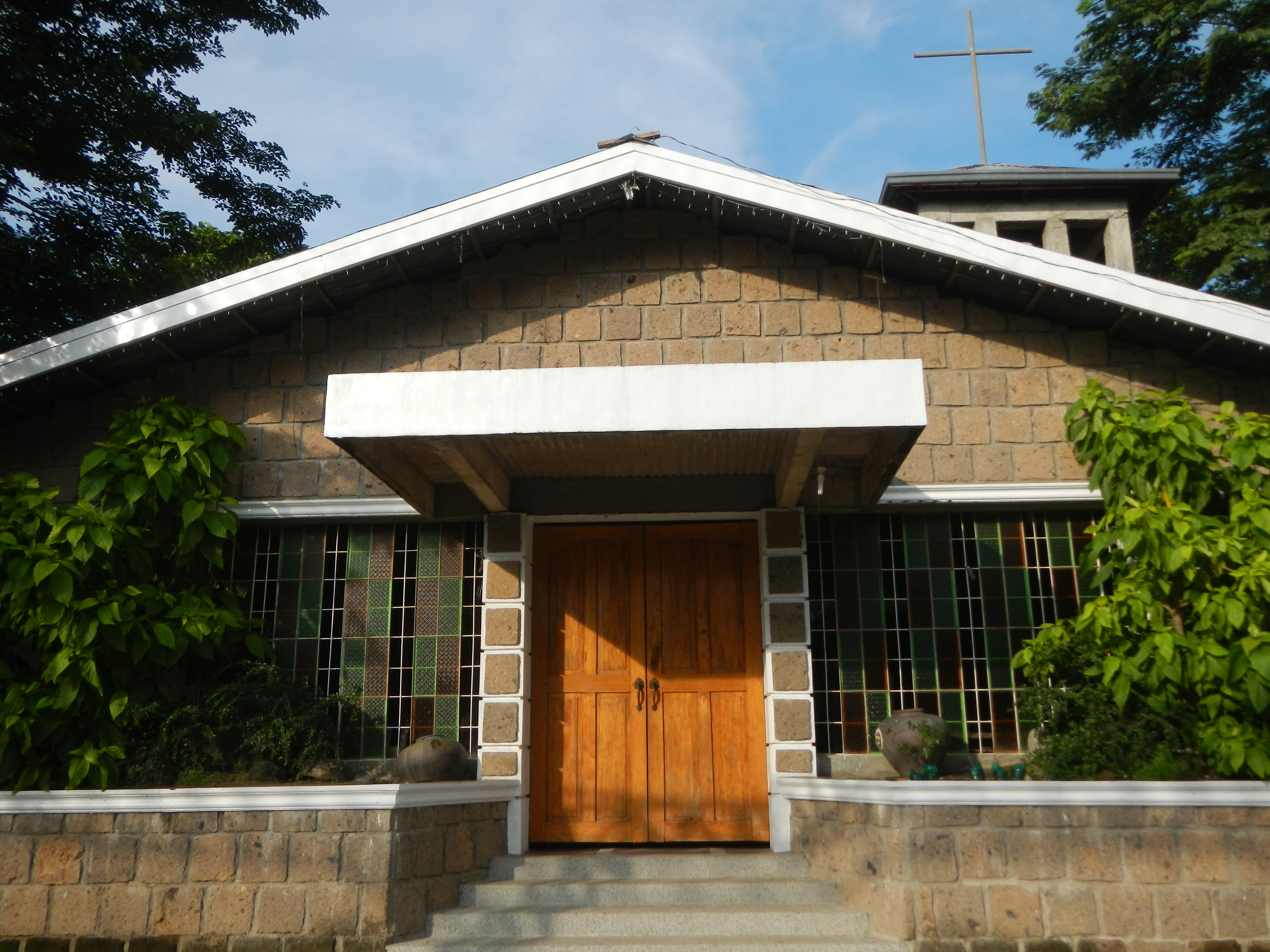
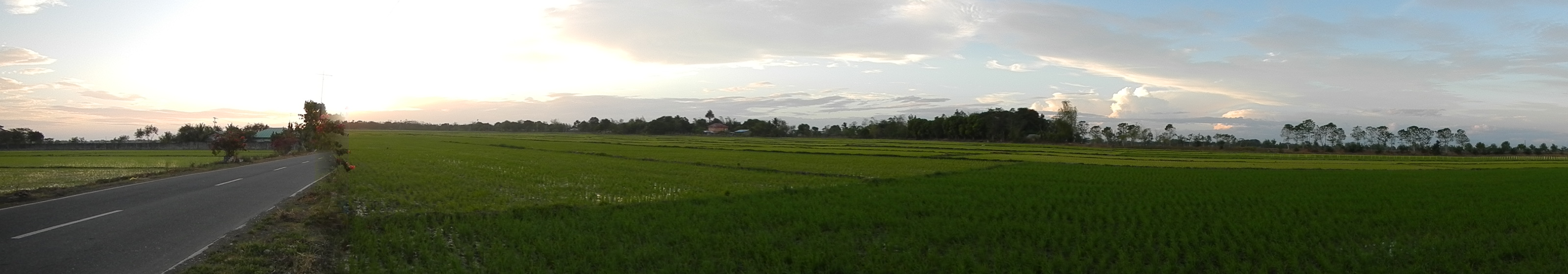
- Quezon Town Hall Pres. Quezon Monument Patimyas Ani Festival Quezon-Aliaga Bridge Paddy Fields in San Miguel Holy Family Parish Santa Clara de Asis Chapel A Panorama of the Town

- Seal
- Nickname: El Toro
- Map of Nueva Ecija with Quezon highlighted
- Interactive map of Quezon
- Location within the Philippines
- Coordinates: 15°33′15″N 120°48′40″E
- Country: Philippines
- Region: Central Luzon
- Province: Nueva Ecija
- District: 1st district
- Founded: 17 January 1916
- Named for: Manuel L. Quezon
- Barangays: 16 (see Barangays)

Government
  - Type: Sangguniang Bayan
  - Mayor: Mariano Cristino N. Joson
  - Vice Mayor: Mariano Noriel M. Joson
  - Representative: Mikaela Angela B. Suansing
  - Municipal Council: Members: Corwin M. Panahon; Winchino F. Capalungan; Fiel Buenaventora S. Joson; Celestino D. Hermoso; Edgardo P. Quijano; Celestino M. Carpio; Cesar D. Ramirez; Joselito O. dela Vega
  - Electorate: 23,438 voters (2025)

Area
  - Total: 68.53 km^{2} (26.46 sq mi)
- Elevation: 28 m (92 ft)
- Highest elevation: 45 m (148 ft)
- Lowest elevation: 19 m (62 ft)

Population (2024 census)
  - Total: 42,621
  - Density: 621.9/km^{2} (1,611/sq mi)
  - Households: 10,540

Economy
  - Income class: 2nd municipal income class
  - Poverty incidence: 11.55% (2023)
  - Revenue: ₱ 264.5 million (2024)
  - Assets: ₱ 641.6 million (2024)
  - Expenditure: ₱ 204.6 million (2024)

Service provider
  - Electricity: Nueva Ecija 2 Area 1 Electric Cooperative (NEECO 2 A1)
- Time zone: UTC+8 (PST)
- ZIP code: 3113
- PSGC: 0304922000
- IDD : area code: +63 (0)44
- Native Language: Tagalog
- Major Religion: Roman Catholic
- Patron Saint: Holy Family
- Festival: Patimyas Ani Festival

Quezon, officially the Municipality of Quezon (Pangasinan: Baley na Quezon; Ilocano: Ili ti Quezon; Tagalog: Bayan ng Quezon; Spanish: Municipio de Quezon), is a municipality in the province of Nueva Ecija, Philippines named after the 2nd president of the Philippines, Manuel L. Quezon. According to the 2024 census, it has a population of 42,621 people.

== History ==
From the Spanish period until the arrival of the Americans, the Municipality of Quezon was only a small barrio of Aliaga, Nueva Ecija. This area was once a dense forest, while the open lands were grasslands thickly covered with cogon. In earlier times, the barrio was called El Toro because the area served as a pasture for cattle owned by a man named Joaquin Samson.

Under the leadership of the gobernadorcillo of Aliaga, the name El Toro was changed, and the place came to be known as Barrio Santo Niño.

The first settlers of the area came from the province of Ilocos, including the families of Simplina, Cruz, Quitan, Zuner, Sajor, Tubay, Nicolas, Capalungan, Duldulao, Lagasca, and Ignacio. They were later followed by Tagalog families from towns in the south, namely the Joson, Villasan, Samson, Magno, Domingo, Tolentino, Evangelista, Garcia, Da Jose, and Quijano families. Through their hard work and perseverance, they cleared the forests and hills and transformed them into agricultural lands.

On 15 November 1915, several prominent residents of Barrio Santo Niño united and petitioned for the barrio to be converted into a municipality. These individuals were Tomas Joson, Martin Villasan, Jose Cruz, Ariston Cebrero, Victor Domingo, Gaudencio Tolentino, Jose Jacinto, Pedro Capalungan, Florentino Da Jose, and Romualdo Quijano. At that time, Don Isauro Gabaldon was the representative of the province of Nueva Ecija to the Philippine Legislature, and with his assistance, their request was granted.

As a result, on 17 November 1917, Barrio Santo Niño officially became a municipality. It was named Quezon in honor of Manuel L. Quezon, who was then the Philippine Resident Commissioner to the United States and who also helped in the barrio’s elevation to municipal status. The first municipal mayor of Quezon was Martin Villasan, followed by Pedro Capalungan as the second mayor.

In its early years, the town of Quezon was visited by the parish priest of Aliaga to attend to the spiritual needs of its residents. Quezon became a full-fledged parish in 1929 and had its first parish priest in the person of Father Emilio Guttierez. The parish was placed under the patronage of the Holy Family.

== Geography ==
Quezon is located in the plains of Central Luzon, in the western portion of the province of Nueva Ecija. It is bounded by the municipalities of Aliaga to the south, Licab to the west, Guimba to the north, and Santo Domingo to the east.

=== Barangays ===
Quezon is politically subdivided into 16 barangays, as shown below. Each barangay consists of puroks and some have sitios.

- Bertese
- Doña Lucia
- Dulong Bayan
- Ilog Baliwag
- Barangay I (Poblacion)
- Barangay II (Poblacion)
- Pulong Bahay
- San Alejandro
- San Andres I
- San Andres II
- San Manuel
- Santa Clara (formerly Casanova)
- Santa Rita
- Santo Cristo
- Santo Tomas Feria (popularly known as Parang)
- San Miguel (formerly Parukot)

=== Climate ===
Climate data for Quezon, Nueva Ecija
Month	Jan	Feb	Mar	Apr	May	Jun	Jul	Aug	Sep	Oct	Nov	Dec	Year
Mean daily maximum °C (°F)	28 (82)	29 (84)	30 (86)	32 (90)	31 (88)	30 (86)	29 (84)	28 (82)	28 (82)	28 (82)	29 (84)	28 (82)	29 (84)
Mean daily minimum °C (°F)	18 (64)	18 (64)	19 (66)	20 (68)	22 (72)	22 (72)	22 (72)	22 (72)	22 (72)	22 (72)	20 (68)	18 (64)	20 (69)
Average precipitation mm (inches)	4 (0.2)	6 (0.2)	7 (0.3)	12 (0.5)	61 (2.4)	89 (3.5)	96 (3.8)	99 (3.9)	81 (3.2)	88 (3.5)	37 (1.5)	13 (0.5)	593 (23.5)
Average rainy days	2.5	3.0	4.1	6.3	15.8	19.4	22.5	21.6	20.1	17.5	9.6	4.0	146.4
Source: Meteoblue

== Demographics ==
Population census of Quezon

Year	Pop.	±% p.a.
1918	6,314	—
1939	8,780	+1.58%
1948	9,452	+0.82%
1960	10,953	+1.24%
1970	15,842	+3.75%
1975	17,178	+1.64%
1980	20,846	+3.95%
1990	25,574	+2.07%

Year	Pop.	±% p.a.
1995	29,172	+2.50%
2000	31,720	+1.81%
2007	33,988	+0.96%
2010	36,660	+2.79%
2015	40,592	+1.96%
2020	41,845	+0.64%
2024	42,621	+0.44%

Source: Philippine Statistics Authority

== Economy ==
Poverty incidence of Quezon (%)

Source: Philippine Statistics Authority

=== Livelihood ===
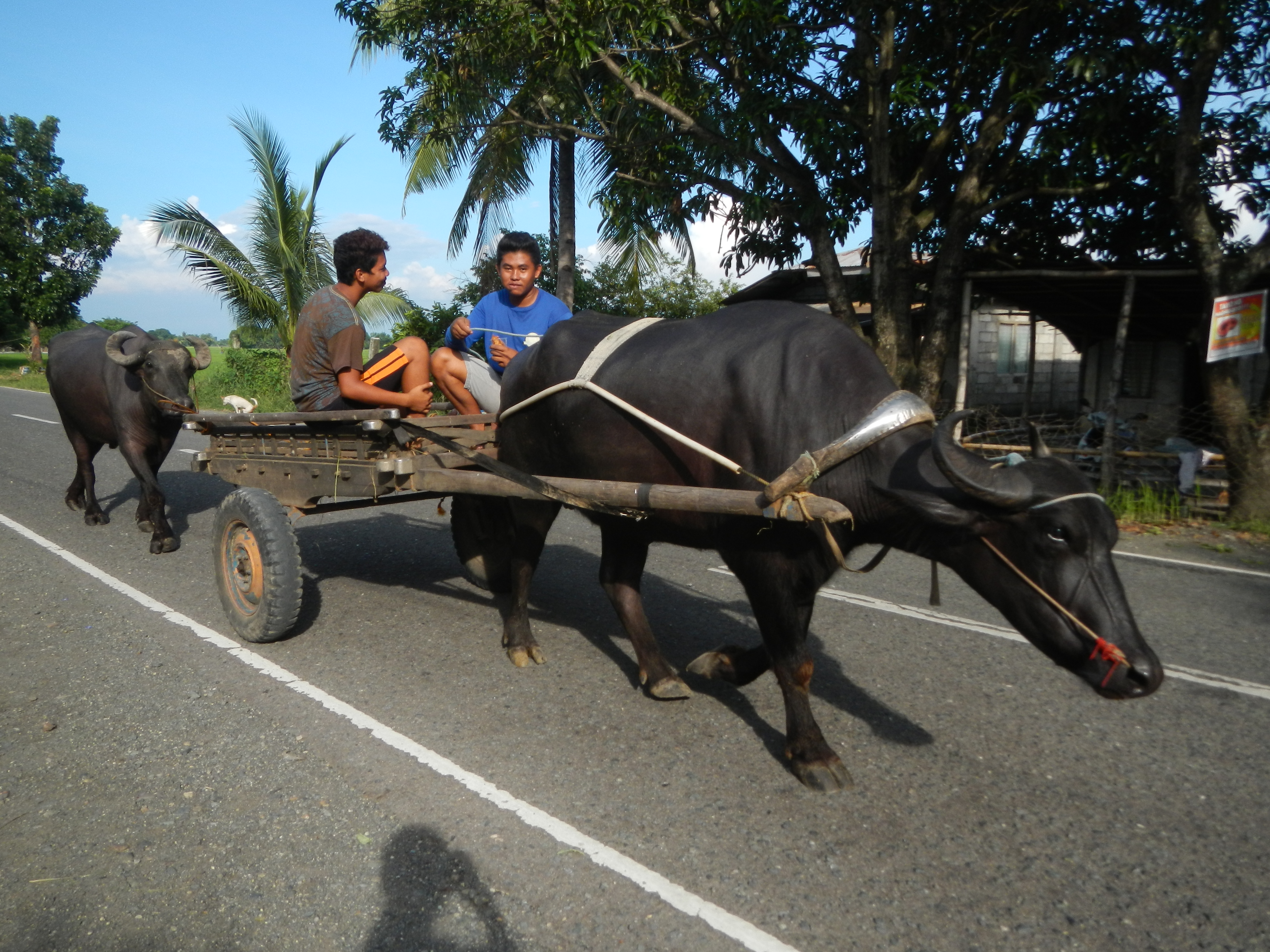
A buffalo-drawn cart used for transporting farm goods in a rural community.

The primary source of livelihood in the Municipality of Quezon has traditionally been agriculture. Large portions of the town’s land are devoted to farming, with residents engaged in the cultivation of rice, corn, and other agricultural crops. Farming remains a major economic activity, providing both subsistence and income for many families.

In addition to crop production, some residents engage in livestock raising, including cattle, poultry, and swine, which supplement household income and support local food supply. Small-scale trading and retail businesses have also developed in the poblacion and nearby barangays, catering to the daily needs of the community.

Over time, employment opportunities expanded to include services, local government work, and labor in nearby municipalities. While agriculture continues to play a central role in the local economy, non-agricultural livelihoods have gradually increased as access to education, transportation, and markets improved.

== Culture and Traditions ==
=== Festival ===
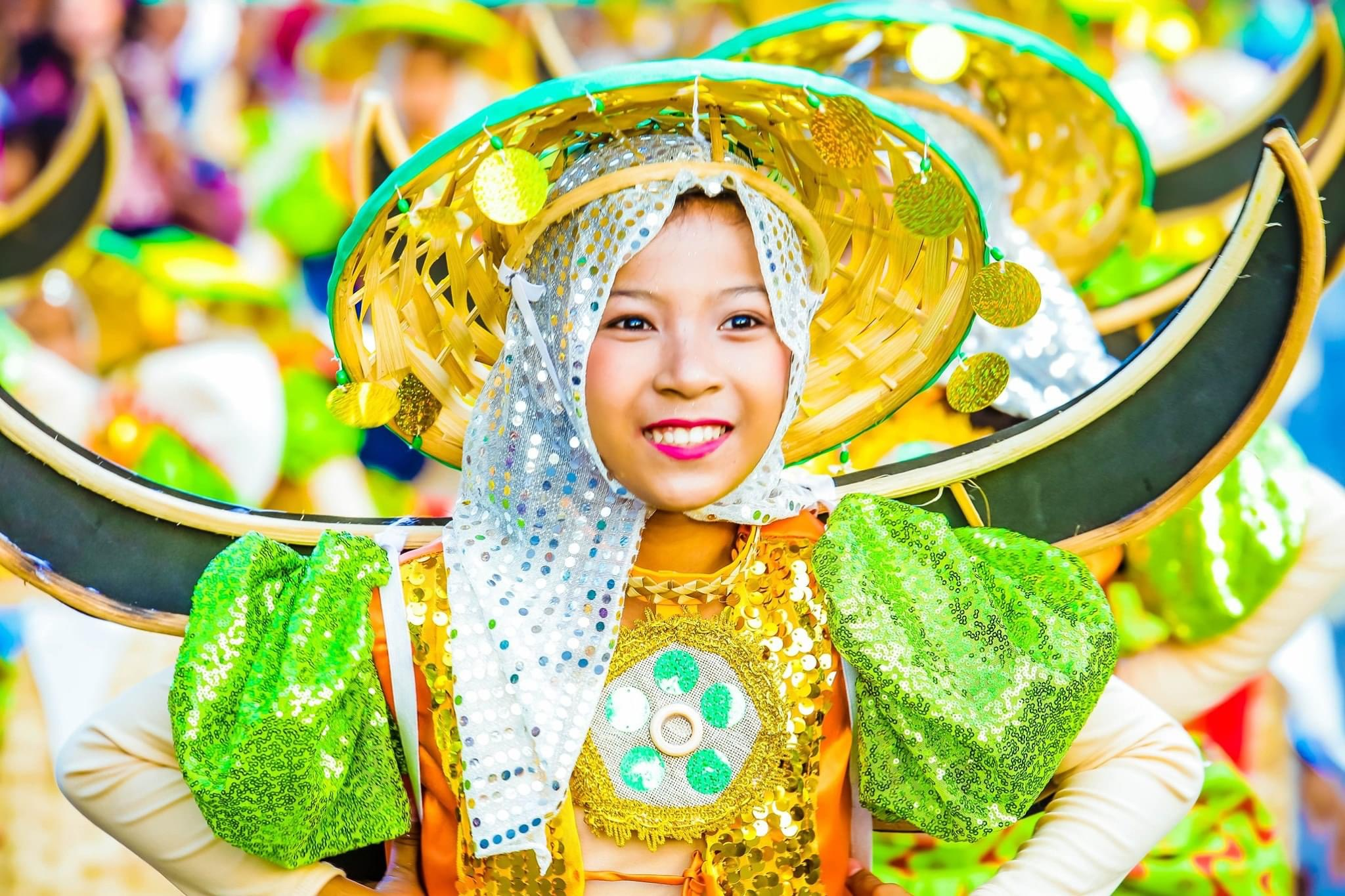
A Patimyas Ani Festival Dancer

The Municipality of Quezon celebrates the Patimyas Ani Festival annually on January 30 as part of the activities leading up to the town fiesta, which is observed on February 3. The festival forms an important component of the pre-fiesta celebrations of the municipality.

The Patimyas Ani Festival emphasizes the significance of agriculture in Quezon and honors the dedication of local farmers and agricultural workers. A major highlight of the celebration is the agriculture-inspired street dancing competition, participated in by students from various elementary schools in the municipality.

Participants wear colorful costumes and carry props made from indigenous and farm-related materials, representing the cultivation of rice, corn, and other agricultural products commonly grown in Quezon, Nueva Ecija. The performances portray both the richness of agricultural life and the challenges faced by the farming community.

The most recent titleholders of the street dancing competition have included Quezon Integrated School, San Andres I Integrated School, and Casanova Elementary School.

Edition	Winner	First Runner-Up	Second Runner-Up
2026	Casanova Elementary School	Tomas Joson Elementary School	Quezon Integrated School
2025	Quezon Integrated School	San Andres I Integrated School	Tomas Joson Elementary School
2024	San Andres I Integrated School	Quezon Integrated School	Casanova Elementary School
2023	No competition held due to COVID-19.		
2022	No competition held due to COVID-19.		
2021	No competition held due to COVID-19.		
2020	Quezon Integrated School	Casanova Elementary School	Tomas Joson Elementary School
2019	Casanova Elementary School	Pulong Bahay Elementary School	Quezon Integrated School
2018	Casanova Elementary School	Pulong Bahay Elementary School	Quezon Integrated School
2017	Casanova Elementary School	San Andres I Integrated School	Tomas Joson Elementary School
2016	Bertese Elementary School	Quezon Integrated School	Santa Rita and Labong Elementary Schools
2015	Quezon Integrated School	Santa Rita and Labong Elementary Schools	Tomas Joson Elementary School
2014	Quezon Integrated School	Santa Rita and Labong Elementary Schools	Casanova Elementary School
2013	Casanova Elementary School	Quezon Integrated School	Santa Rita and Labong Elementary Schools

=== Beliefs ===
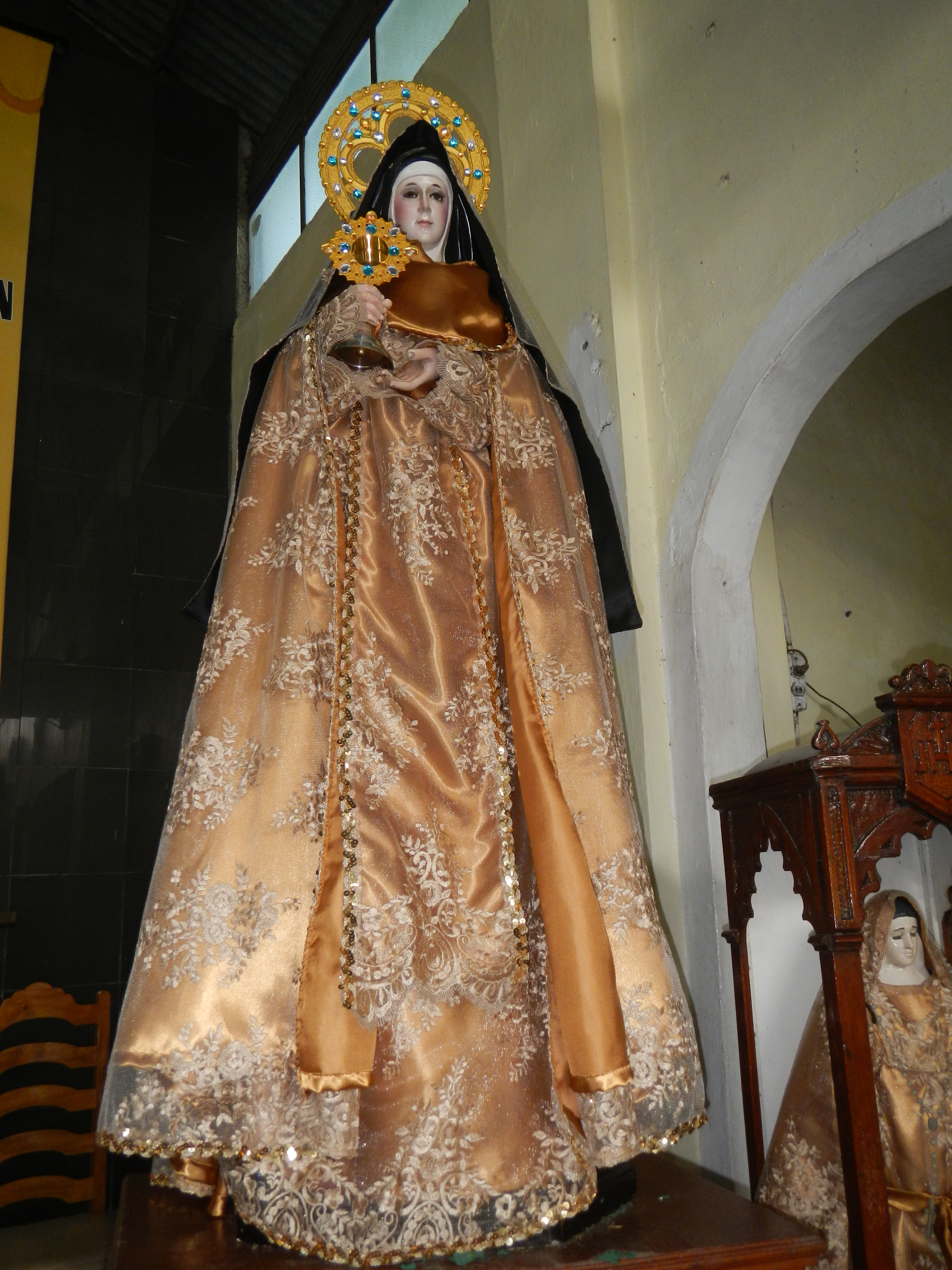
St. Clare Image in Santa Clara de Asis Chapel

Roman Catholicism is the predominant religion in the Municipality of Quezon. The town is served by the Holy Family Parish, which is under the jurisdiction of the Diocese of San Jose (Nueva Ecija). Catholic beliefs and practices play a significant role in community life, closely tied to local traditions, celebrations, and social activities.

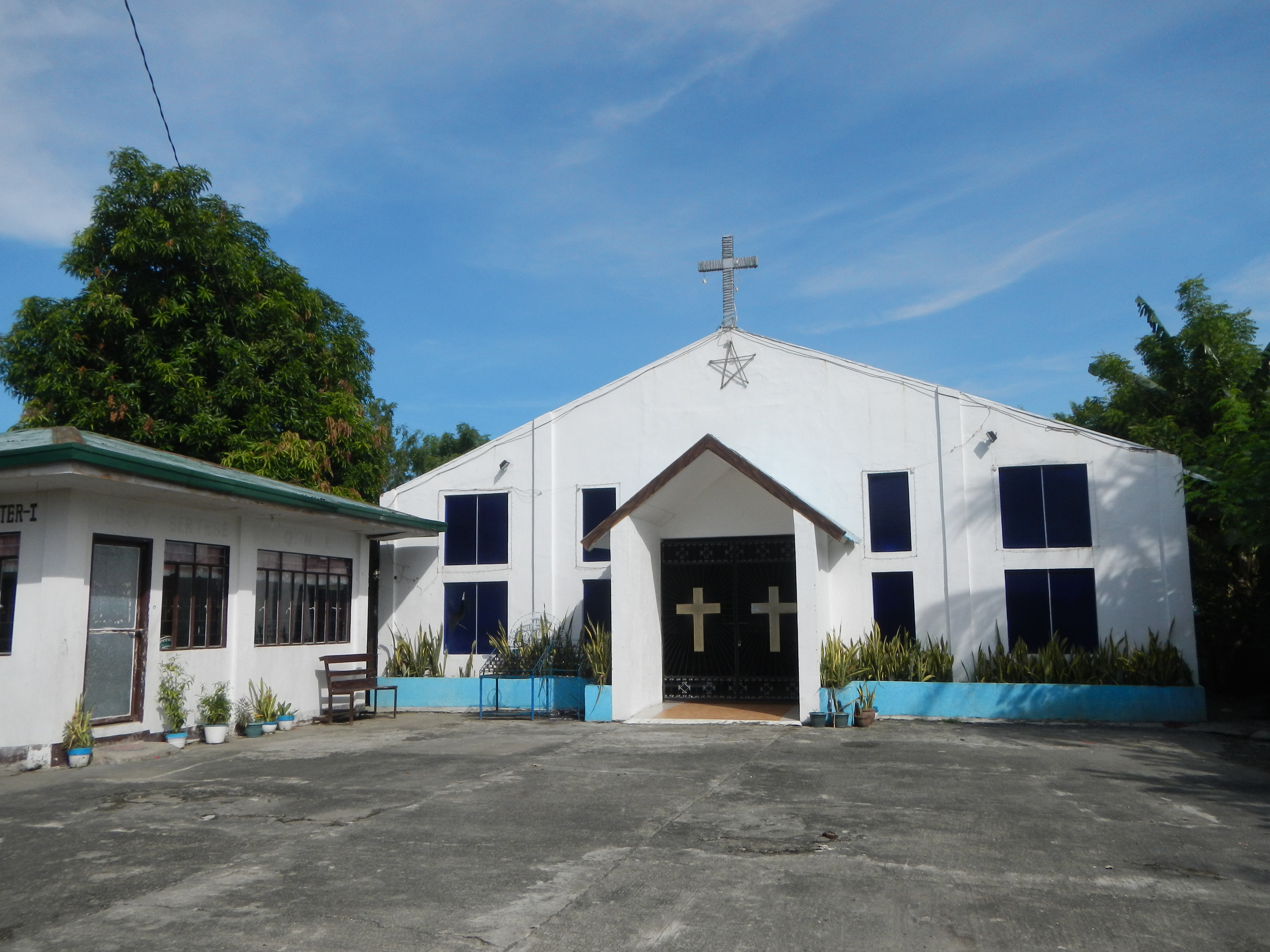
Immaculate Conception Chapel in Bertese

Several barangays also have notable patron saints and hold their own religious celebrations. For example, Saint Clare of Assisi is venerated in Brgy. Santa Clara, the Black Nazarene in Ilog Baliwag, and the Immaculate Conception in Bertese. These observances include fiestas, processions, and other devotional activities that strengthen community bonds.

Other religions and Christian denominations are also present in Quezon, including Baptists, Iglesia ni Cristo, Jehovah’s Witnesses, Born Again Christians, and Methodists.

== Education ==
The Quezon Schools District Office governs all educational institutions within the municipality. It oversees the management and operations of all private and public, from primary to secondary schools.

=== Primary Schools ===
- Bertese Elementary School
- Casanova Elementary School
- Doña Lucia Elementary School
- Emmanuel Center of Learning Academy
- Labong Elementary School
- Osmena Elementary School
- Pulong Bahay Elementary School
- Ricardo L. Joson Elementary School
- San Andres II Elementary School
- San Manuel Elementary School
- San Miguel Elementary School
- Sta. Rita Elementary School
- Sto. Cristo Elementary School
- Sto. Tomas Feria Elementary School
- Tomas Joson Elementary School

=== Secondary Schools ===
- Eduardo L. Joson Memornial High School
- Holy Family Academy of Quezon, Nueva Ecija, Inc.
- Quezon Integrated School
- San Alejandro Integrated School
- San Andres I Integrated School
- Solomon's Excellence Academy School

== Notable personalities ==
- Cristy Fermin - talk show host and reporter
- Eduardo Joson - Filipino military officer and longest-serving governor of Nueva Ecija

== Gallery ==
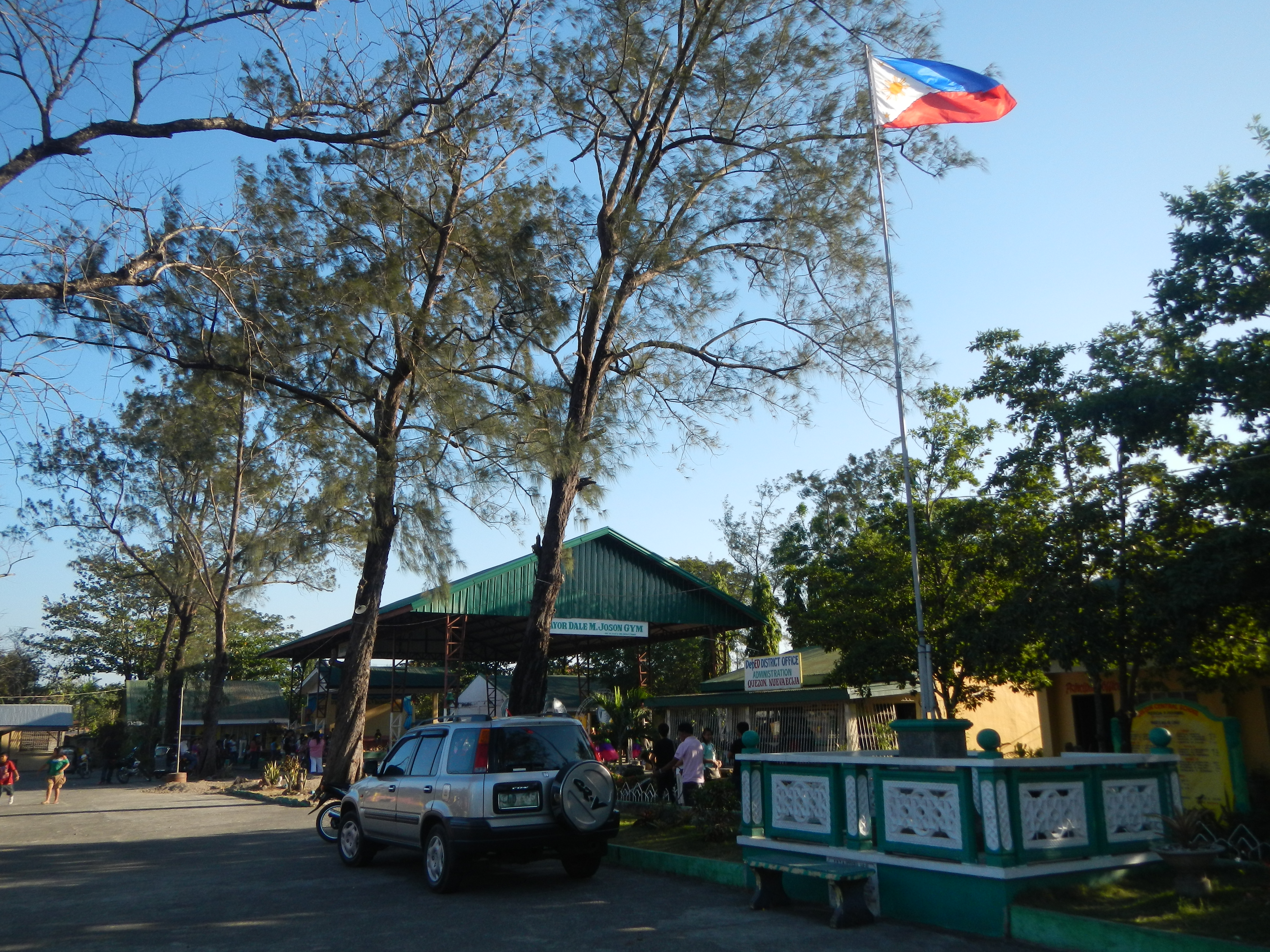
Quezon Integrated School

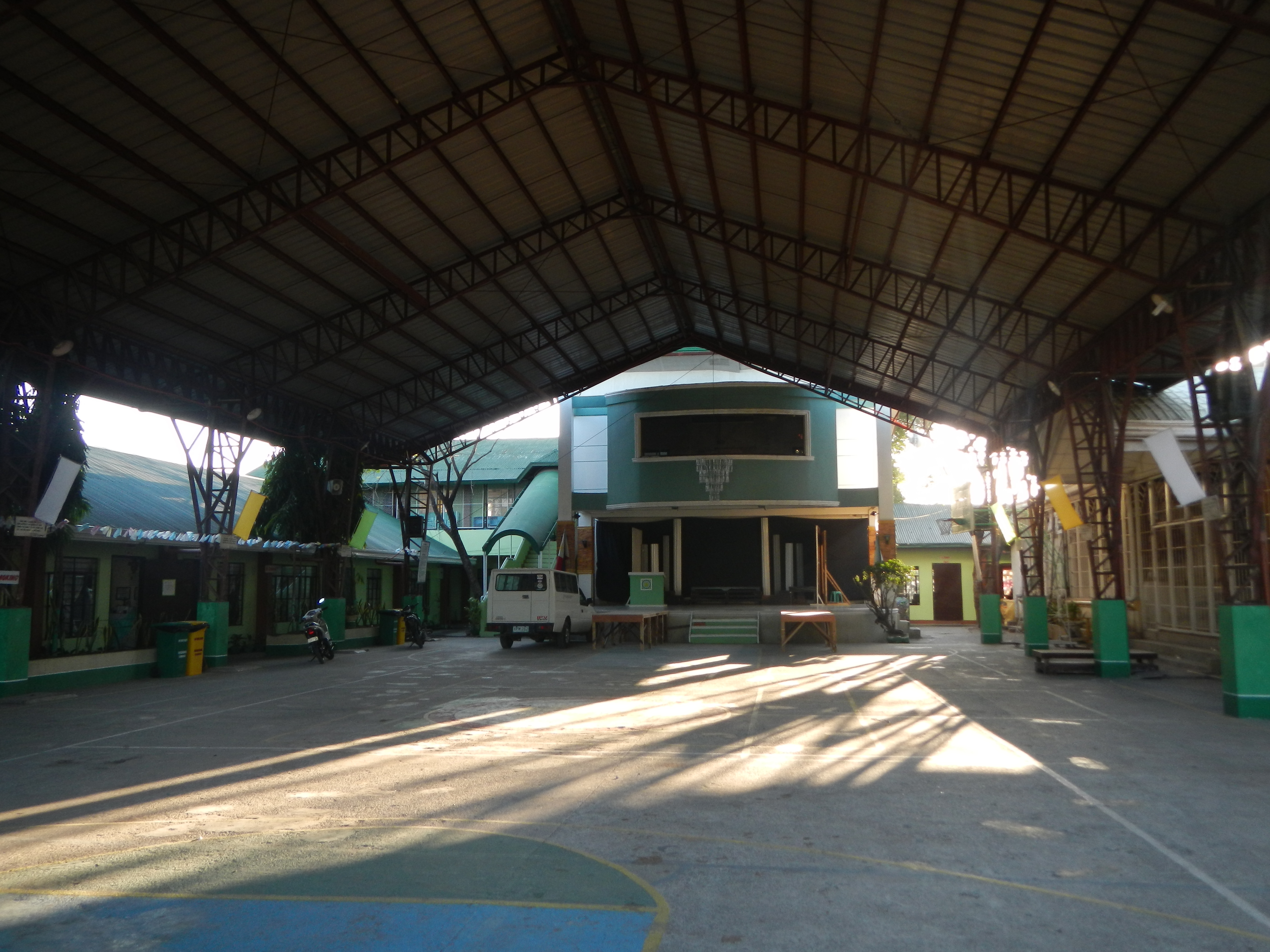
Holy Family Academy of Quezon, Nueva Ecija, Inc.

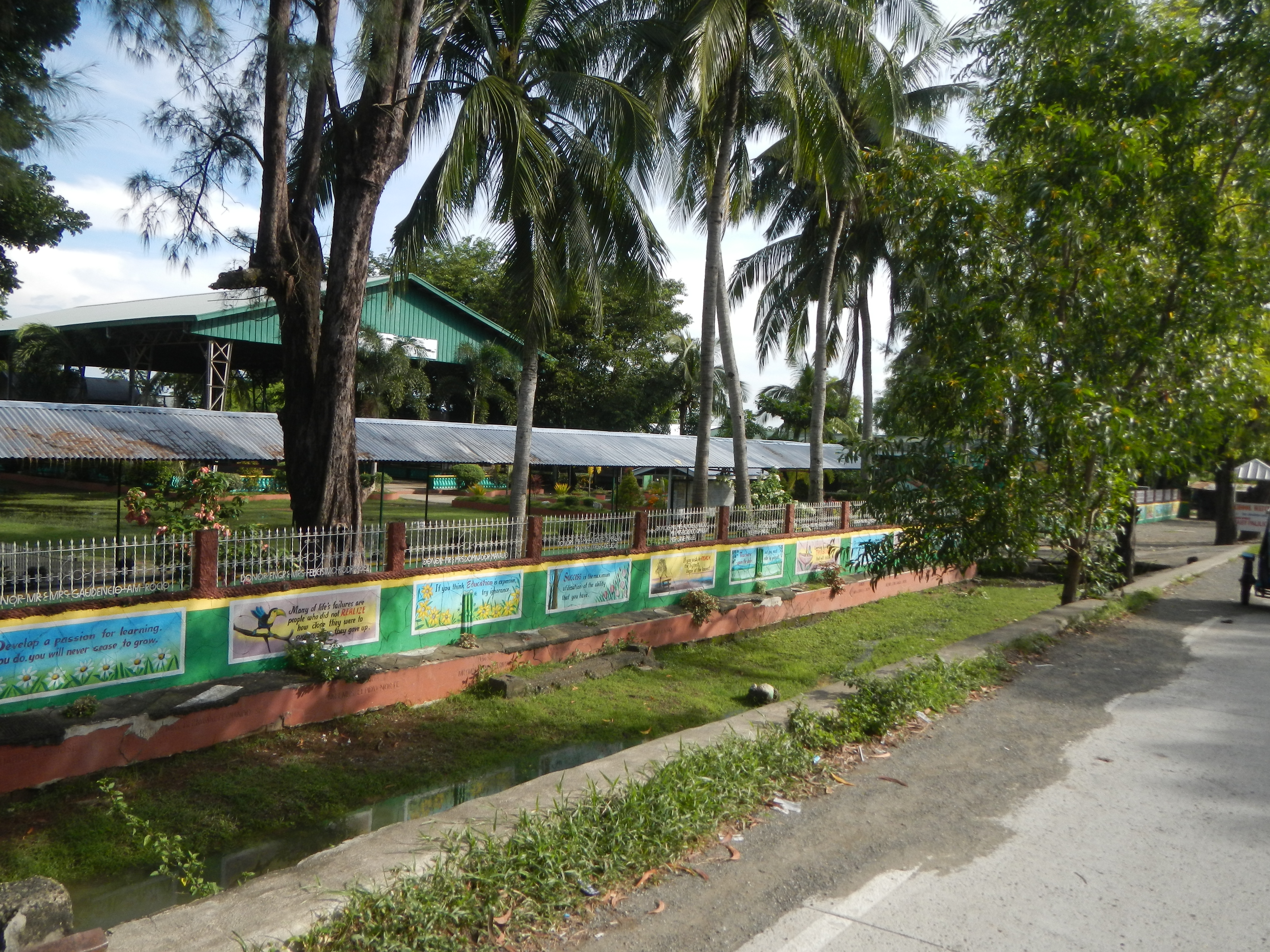
Tomas Joson Elementary School
