= 2022 Philippine House of Representatives elections in Central Luzon =

- May 9, 2022
- All 24 Central Luzon seats in the House of Representatives
Party	Seats	+/–
PDP–Laban	8	−1
NUP	6	+2
NPC	3	0
Nacionalista	3	+2
Lakas	2	+1
SZP	1	New
LDP	1	0
This lists parties that won seats. See the complete results below.

The 2022 Philippine House of Representatives elections in Central Luzon were held on May 9, 2022.

== Summary ==
Congressional district	Incumbent	Incumbent's party	Winner	Winner's party	Winning margin
Aurora	Rommel T. Angara	LDP	Rommel T. Angara	LDP	Unopposed
Bataan–1st	Geraldine Roman	Lakas	Geraldine Roman	Lakas	Unopposed
Bataan–2nd	Joet Garcia	PDP–Laban	Albert Garcia	NUP	57.88%
Bataan–3rd	New seat		Maria Angela Garcia	NUP	16.50%
Bulacan–1st	Jose Antonio Sy-Alvarado	PDP–Laban	Danny Domingo	NUP	17.78%
Bulacan–2nd	Gavini Pancho	NUP	Tina Pancho	NUP	65.99%
Bulacan–3rd	Lorna Silverio	NUP	Lorna Silverio	NUP	39.49%
Bulacan–4th	Henry Villarica	PDP–Laban	Linabelle Villarica	PDP–Laban	85.21%
Bulacan–5th	New seat		Ambrosio Cruz	PDP–Laban	6.30%
Bulacan–6th	New seat		Salvador Pleyto	PDP–Laban	2.26%
Nueva Ecija–1st	Estrellita Suansing	PDP–Laban	Mika Suansing	Nacionalista	32.02%
Nueva Ecija–2nd	Micaela Violago	NUP	Joseph Gilbert Violago	NUP	20.71%
Nueva Ecija–3rd	Rosanna Vergara	PDP–Laban	Rosanna Vergara	PDP–Laban	6.16%
Nueva Ecija–4th	Maricel Natividad-Nagaño	Unang Sigaw	Emeng Pascual	PDP–Laban	7.10%
Pampanga–1st	Carmelo Lazatin II	PDP–Laban	Carmelo Lazatin II	PDP–Laban	Unopposed
Pampanga–2nd	Mikey Arroyo	Lakas	Gloria Macapagal Arroyo	Lakas	Unopposed
Pampanga–3rd	Aurelio Gonzales Jr.	PDP–Laban	Aurelio Gonzales Jr.	PDP–Laban	Unopposed
Pampanga–4th	Juan Pablo Bondoc	PDP–Laban	Anna York Bondoc	Nacionalista	92.50%
San Jose del Monte	Florida Robes	PDP–Laban	Florida Robes	PDP–Laban	28.42%
Tarlac–1st	Vacant		Jaime Cojuangco	NPC	89.04%
Tarlac–2nd	Victor Yap	NPC	Christian Yap	NPC	64.02%
Tarlac–3rd	Noel Villanueva	NPC	Bong Rivera	NPC	12.83%
Zambales–1st	Jeffrey Khonghun	Nacionalista	Jay Khonghun	Nacionalista	59.08%
Zambales–2nd	Cheryl Deloso-Montalla	NPC	Bing Maniquiz	SZP	28.96%

== Aurora ==
Incumbent Rommel T. Angara of Laban ng Demokratikong Pilipino won re-election for a second term unopposed.

Candidate	Party	Votes	%
Rommel T. Angara (incumbent)	Laban ng Demokratikong Pilipino	103,147	100.00
Total		103,147	100.00
Total votes		130,167	–
Registered voters/turnout		154,688	84.15
LDP hold			
Source: Commission on Elections

== Bataan ==
=== 1st district ===
As a result of Bataan's redistricting in 2021, the municipalities of Dinalupihan and Morong were separated from the district to create Bataan's 3rd district.

Incumbent Geraldine Roman of Lakas–CMD won re-election for a third term unopposed. She was previously affiliated with PDP–Laban.

Candidate	Party	Votes	%
Geraldine Roman (incumbent)	Lakas–CMD	107,496	100.00
Total		107,496	100.00
Total votes		138,724	–
Registered voters/turnout		156,757	88.50
Lakas hold			
Source: Commission on Elections

=== 2nd district ===
As a result of Bataan's redistricting in 2021, the municipalities of Bagac and Mariveles were separated from the district to create Bataan's 3rd district.

Incumbent Joet Garcia of PDP–Laban ran for governor of Bataan.

Garcia endorsed his brother, Bataan governor Albert Garcia (National Unity Party), who won the election against Laissa Roque (PROMDI).

Candidate	Party	Votes	%
Albert Garcia	National Unity Party	128,222	78.94
Laissa Roque	PROMDI	34,201	21.06
Total		162,423	100.00
Total votes		173,406	–
Registered voters/turnout		197,735	87.70
NUP gain from PDP–Laban			
Source: Commission on Elections

=== 3rd district ===
As a result of Bataan's redistricting in 2021, the 3rd district was created with the municipalities of Dinalupihan and Morong from the 1st district and the municipalities of Bagac and Mariveles from the 2nd district.

Dinalupihan mayor Maria Angela Garcia (National Unity Party) won the election against former Mariveles mayor Boboy Peliglorio (Partido Demokratiko Sosyalista ng Pilipinas).

Candidate	Party	Votes	%
Maria Angela Garcia	National Unity Party	102,488	58.25
Boboy Peliglorio	Partido Demokratiko Sosyalista ng Pilipinas	73,465	41.75
Total		175,953	100.00
Total votes		186,163	–
Registered voters/turnout		211,987	87.82
NUP gain			
Source: Commission on Elections

== Bulacan ==
=== 1st district ===
Incumbent Jose Antonio Sy-Alvarado of PDP–Laban ran for a third term. He was previously affiliated with the National Unity Party (NUP).

Sy-Alvarado was defeated by former Malolos mayor Danny Domingo of the NUP.

Candidate	Party	Votes	%
Danny Domingo	National Unity Party	202,712	58.21
Jose Antonio Sy-Alvarado (incumbent)	PDP–Laban	140,798	40.43
Mac de Guzman	Reform Party	4,748	1.36
Total		348,258	100.00
Total votes		381,801	–
Registered voters/turnout		437,780	87.21
NUP gain from PDP–Laban			
Source: Commission on Elections

=== 2nd district ===
As a result of Bulacan's redistricting in 2021, the municipalities of Balagtas, Bocaue, Guiguinto and Pandi were separated from the district to create Bulacan's 5th district.

Incumbent Gavini Pancho of the National Unity Party (NUP) was term-limited.

The NUP nominated Pancho's sister, Tina Pancho, who won the election against three other candidates.

Candidate	Party	Votes	%
Tina Pancho	National Unity Party	137,276	80.64
FB Bermudez	Nationalist People's Coalition	24,936	14.65
Jimmy Villafuerte	Independent	4,746	2.79
Tony Deborja	Independent	3,277	1.92
Total		170,235	100.00
Total votes		196,901	–
Registered voters/turnout		224,922	87.54
NUP hold			
Source: Commission on Elections

=== 3rd district ===
As a result of Bulacan's redistricting in 2021, the municipalities of Angat and Norzagaray were separated from the district to create Bulacan's 6th district.

Incumbent Lorna Silverio of the National Unity Party ran for a third term.

Silverio won re-election against former San Rafael mayor Jessie Viceo (Aksyon Demokratiko) and Allan Villena (Independent).

Candidate	Party	Votes	%
Lorna Silverio (incumbent)	National Unity Party	143,698	69.07
Jessie Viceo	Aksyon Demokratiko	61,528	29.58
Allan Villena	Independent	2,811	1.35
Total		208,037	100.00
Total votes		234,096	–
Registered voters/turnout		265,734	88.09
NUP hold			
Source: Commission on Elections

=== 4th district ===
As a result of Bulacan's redistricting in 2021, the municipality of Santa Maria was separated from the district to create Bulacan's 6th district.

Incumbent Henry Villarica of PDP–Laban retired to run for mayor of Meycauayan.

PDP–Laban nominated Villarica's wife, Meycauayan mayor Linabelle Villarica, who won the election against two other candidates.

Candidate	Party	Votes	%
Linabelle Villarica (incumbent)	PDP–Laban	180,067	91.01
Raquel Guardiano	Aksyon Demokratiko	11,476	5.80
Ferdy Victolero	People's Reform Party	6,303	3.19
Total		197,846	100.00
Total votes		231,109	–
Registered voters/turnout		265,701	86.98
PDP–Laban hold			
Source: Commission on Elections

=== 5th district ===
As a result of Bulacan's redistricting in 2021, the 5th district was created with the municipalities of Balagtas, Bocaue, Guiguinto and Pandi from the 2nd district.

Guiguinto mayor Ambrosio Cruz Jr. (PDP–Laban) won the election against former Bureau of Customs deputy commissioner Arnel Alcaraz (National Unity Party).

Candidate	Party	Votes	%
Ambrosio Cruz Jr.	PDP–Laban	128,065	53.15
Arnel Alcaraz	National Unity Party	112,899	46.85
Total		240,964	100.00
Total votes		260,637	–
Registered voters/turnout		291,581	89.39
PDP–Laban gain			
Source: Commission on Elections

=== 6th district ===
As a result of Bulacan's redistricting in 2021, the 5th district was created with the municipalities of Angat and Norzagaray from the 3rd district and the municipality of Santa Maria from the 4th district.

Former Department of Public Works and Highways undersecretary Salvador Pleyto (PDP–Laban) won the election against Norzagaray mayor Fred Germar (National Unity Party), Santa Maria councilor Kaye Martinez Daly (Liberal Party) and three other candidates.

Candidate	Party	Votes	%
Salvador Pleyto	PDP–Laban	81,307	37.68
Fred Germar	National Unity Party	76,430	35.42
Kaye Martinez Daly	Liberal Party	51,491	23.86
Ramoncarlos Villarama	Aksyon Demokratiko	5,141	2.38
Jose Mangulabnan	Independent	828	0.38
Ernesto Padernos	Independent	595	0.28
Total		215,792	100.00
Total votes		229,133	–
Registered voters/turnout		260,065	88.11
PDP–Laban gain			
Source: Commission on Elections

=== San Jose del Monte ===
Incumbent Florida Robes of PDP–Laban ran for a third term.

Robes won re-election against former city mayor Reynaldo San Pedro (Partido Pederal ng Maharlika).

Candidate	Party	Votes	%
Florida Robes	PDP–Laban	136,680	64.21
Reynaldo San Pedro	Partido Pederal ng Maharlika	76,192	35.79
Total		212,872	100.00
Total votes		224,543	–
Registered voters/turnout		261,740	85.79
PDP–Laban hold			
Source: Commission on Elections

== Nueva Ecija ==
=== 1st district ===
Incumbent Estrellita Suansing of PDP–Laban was term-limited.

Suansing endorsed her daughter, Mika Suansing, who won the election against former provincial board member Rommel Padilla (PDP–Laban) and former Philippine Charity Sweepstakes Office general manager Alex Balutan (Reform Party).

Candidate	Party	Votes	%
Mika Suansing	Nacionalista Party	171,946	58.77
Rommel Padilla	PDP–Laban	78,251	26.75
Alex Balutan	Reform Party	42,354	14.48
Total		292,551	100.00
Total votes		325,958	–
Registered voters/turnout		388,005	84.01
Nacionalista gain from PDP–Laban			
Source: Commission on Elections

=== 2nd district ===
Incumbent Micaela Violago of the National Unity Party retired.

The NUP nominated Violago's husband, former representative Joseph Gilbert Violago, who won the election against his brother Lito Violago (Independent), former representative Simeon Garcia Jr. (Aksyon Demokratiko) and Danilo Malanda (Independent).

Candidate	Party	Votes	%
Joseph Gilbert Violago	National Unity Party	116,099	47.79
Lito Violago	Independent	65,797	27.08
Simeon Garcia Jr.	Aksyon Demokratiko	59,607	24.54
Danilo Malanda	Independent	1,436	0.59
Total		242,939	100.00
Total votes		269,103	–
Registered voters/turnout		319,000	84.36
NUP hold			
Source: Commission on Elections

=== 3rd district ===
Incumbent Rosanna Vergara of PDP–Laban ran for a third term.

Vergara won re-election against former representative Cherry Umali (Unang Sigaw).

Candidate	Party	Votes	%
Rosanna Vergara	PDP–Laban	180,888	53.08
Cherry Umali	Unang Sigaw	159,922	46.92
Total		340,810	100.00
Total votes		354,792	–
Registered voters/turnout		431,025	82.31
PDP–Laban hold			
Source: Commission on Elections

=== 4th district ===
Incumbent Maricel Natividad Nagaño of Unang Sigaw ran for a second term. She was previously affiliated with the People's Reform Party.

Nagaño was defeated by Gapan mayor Emeng Pascual of PDP–Laban.

Candidate	Party	Votes	%
Emeng Pascual	PDP–Laban	177,046	53.55
Maricel Natividad Nagaño (incumbent)	Unang Sigaw	153,599	46.45
Total		330,645	100.00
Total votes		347,390	–
Registered voters/turnout		403,655	86.06
PDP–Laban gain from Unang Sigaw			
Source: Commission on Elections

== Pampanga ==
=== 1st district ===
Incumbent Carmelo Lazatin II of PDP–Laban won re-election for a third term unopposed.

Candidate	Party	Votes	%
Carmelo Lazatin II (incumbent)	PDP–Laban	245,672	100.00
Total		245,672	100.00
Total votes		357,668	–
Registered voters/turnout		416,188	85.94
PDP–Laban hold			
Source: Commission on Elections

=== 2nd district ===
Incumbent Mikey Arroyo of Lakas–CMD retired.

Lakas–CMD nominated Arroyo's mother, former representative Gloria Macapagal Arroyo, who won the election unopposed.

Candidate	Party	Votes	%
Gloria Macapagal Arroyo	Lakas–CMD	233,042	100.00
Total		233,042	100.00
Total votes		309,051	–
Registered voters/turnout		353,548	87.41
Lakas hold			
Source: Commission on Elections

=== 3rd district ===
Incumbent Aurelio Gonzales Jr. of PDP–Laban won re-election for a third term unopposed.

Candidate	Party	Votes	%
Aurelio Gonzales Jr. (incumbent)	PDP–Laban	291,594	100.00
Total		291,594	100.00
Total votes		384,455	–
Registered voters/turnout		439,078	87.56
PDP–Laban hold			
Source: Commission on Elections

=== 4th district ===
Incumbent Juan Pablo Bondoc of PDP–Laban was term-limited.

Bondoc endorsed his sister, former representative Anna York Bondoc (Nacionalista Party), who won the election against Regino Mallari (Independent).

Candidate	Party	Votes	%
Anna York Bondoc	Nacionalista Party	260,362	96.25
Regino Mallari	Independent	10,155	3.75
Total		270,517	100.00
Total votes		323,314	–
Registered voters/turnout		371,659	86.99
Nacionalista gain from PDP–Laban			
Source: Commission on Elections

== Tarlac ==
=== 1st district ===
The seat was vacant after Charlie Cojuangco of the Nationalist People's Coalition (NPC) died on February 22, 2022. Cojuangco was running for a third term prior to his death.

The NPC substituted Cojuangco with his son, Jaime Cojuangco, who won the election against Joseph Ramac (Independent).

Candidate	Party	Votes	%
Jaime Cojuangco	Nationalist People's Coalition	191,827	94.52
Joseph Ramac	Independent	11,127	5.48
Total		202,954	100.00
Total votes		246,344	–
Registered voters/turnout		286,133	86.09
NPC hold			
Source: Commission on Elections

=== 2nd district ===
Incumbent Victor Yap of the Nationalist People's Coalition (NPC) initially ran for a third term, but later withdrew.

The NPC substituted Yap with his nephew, Victoria mayor Christian Yap, who won the election against Faustino Galang II (PDP–Laban).

Candidate	Party	Votes	%
Christian Yap	Nationalist People's Coalition	208,195	82.01
Faustino Galang II	PDP–Laban	45,668	17.99
Total		253,863	100.00
Total votes		292,644	–
Registered voters/turnout		332,594	87.99
NPC hold			
Source: Commission on Elections

=== 3rd district ===
Term-limited incumbent Noel Villanueva of the Nationalist People's Coalition (NPC) ran for mayor of Concepcion.

The NPC nominated Concepcion Liga ng mga Barangay president Bong Rivera, who won the election against Concepcion mayor Andres Lacson (Aksyon Demokratiko) and Bamban mayor Jose Antonio Feliciano (Independent).

Candidate	Party	Votes	%
Bong Rivera	Nationalist People's Coalition	114,223	48.28
Andres Lacson	Aksyon Demokratiko	83,866	35.45
Jose Antonio Feliciano	Independent	38,484	16.27
Total		236,573	100.00
Total votes		248,343	–
Registered voters/turnout		279,907	88.72
NPC hold			
Source: Commission on Elections

== Zambales ==
=== 1st district ===
Term-limited incumbent Jeffrey Khonghun of the Nacionalista Party ran for mayor of Castillejos.

The Nacionalista Party nominated Khonghun's son, Zambales vice governor Jay Khonghun, who won the election against former representative Mitos Magsaysay (PDP–Laban).

Candidate	Party	Votes	%
Jay Khonghun	Nacionalista Party	156,561	79.54
Mitos Magsaysay	PDP–Laban	40,262	20.46
Total		196,823	100.00
Total votes		208,399	–
Registered voters/turnout		253,619	82.17
Nacionalista hold			
Source: Commission on Elections

=== 2nd district ===
Term-limited incumbent Cheryl Deloso-Montalla of the Nationalist People's Coalition (NPC) ran for governor of Zambales. She was previously affiliated with the Liberal Party.

The NPC nominated Deloso-Montalla's father, former Zambales governor Amor Deloso, who was defeated by Botolan mayor Bing Maniquiz of the Sulong Zambales Party. Philip Camara (Independent) also ran for representative.

Candidate	Party	Votes	%
Bing Maniquiz	Sulong Zambales Party	144,060	62.13
Amor Deloso	Nationalist People's Coalition	76,906	33.17
Philip Camara	Independent	10,890	4.70
Total		231,856	100.00
Total votes		250,273	–
Registered voters/turnout		286,690	87.30
SZP gain from NPC			
Source: Commission on Elections
