= San Isidro, Nueva Ecija =

Municipality in Nueva Ecija, Philippines

San Isidro
- Municipality
- Municipality of San Isidro
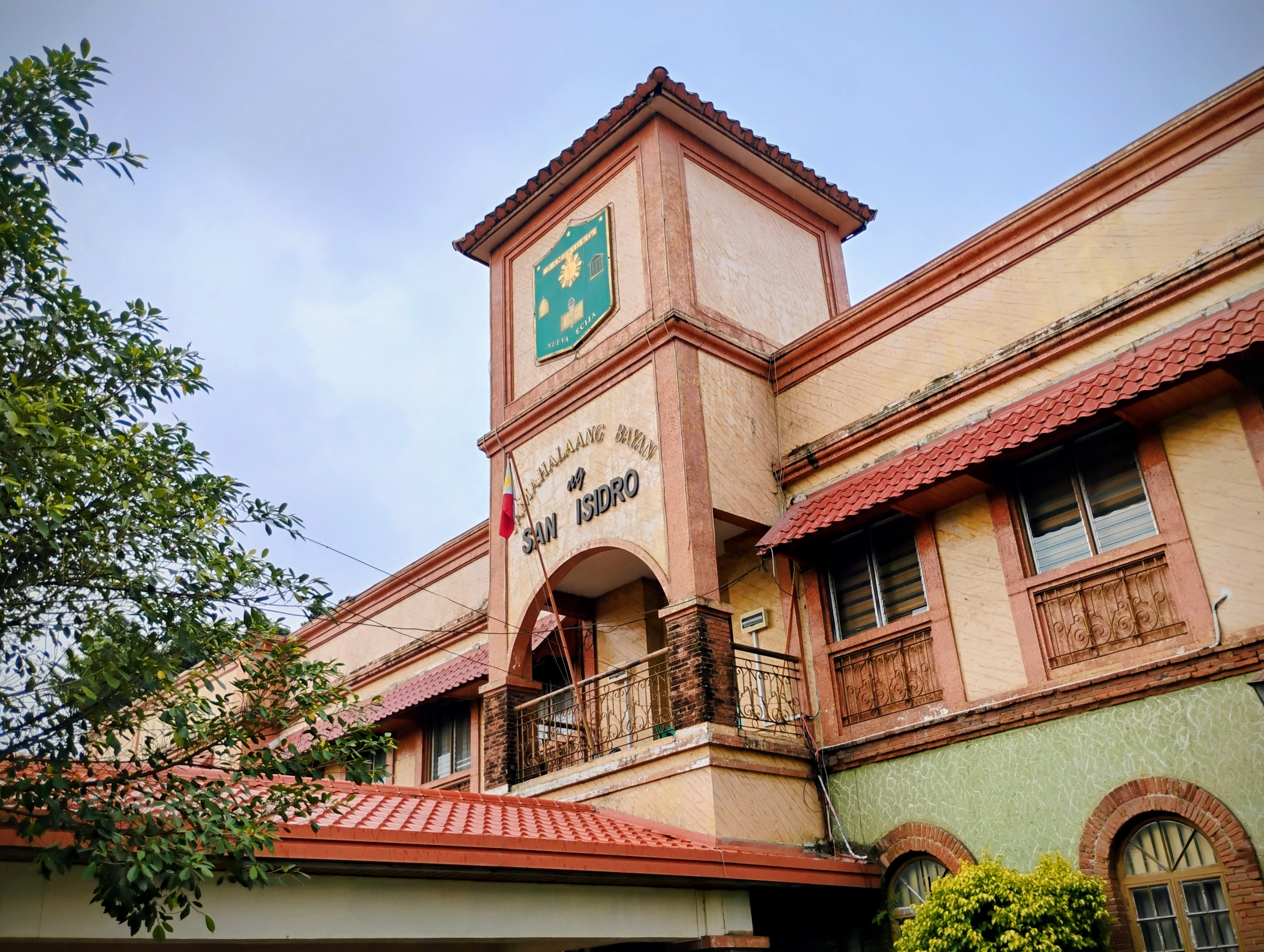
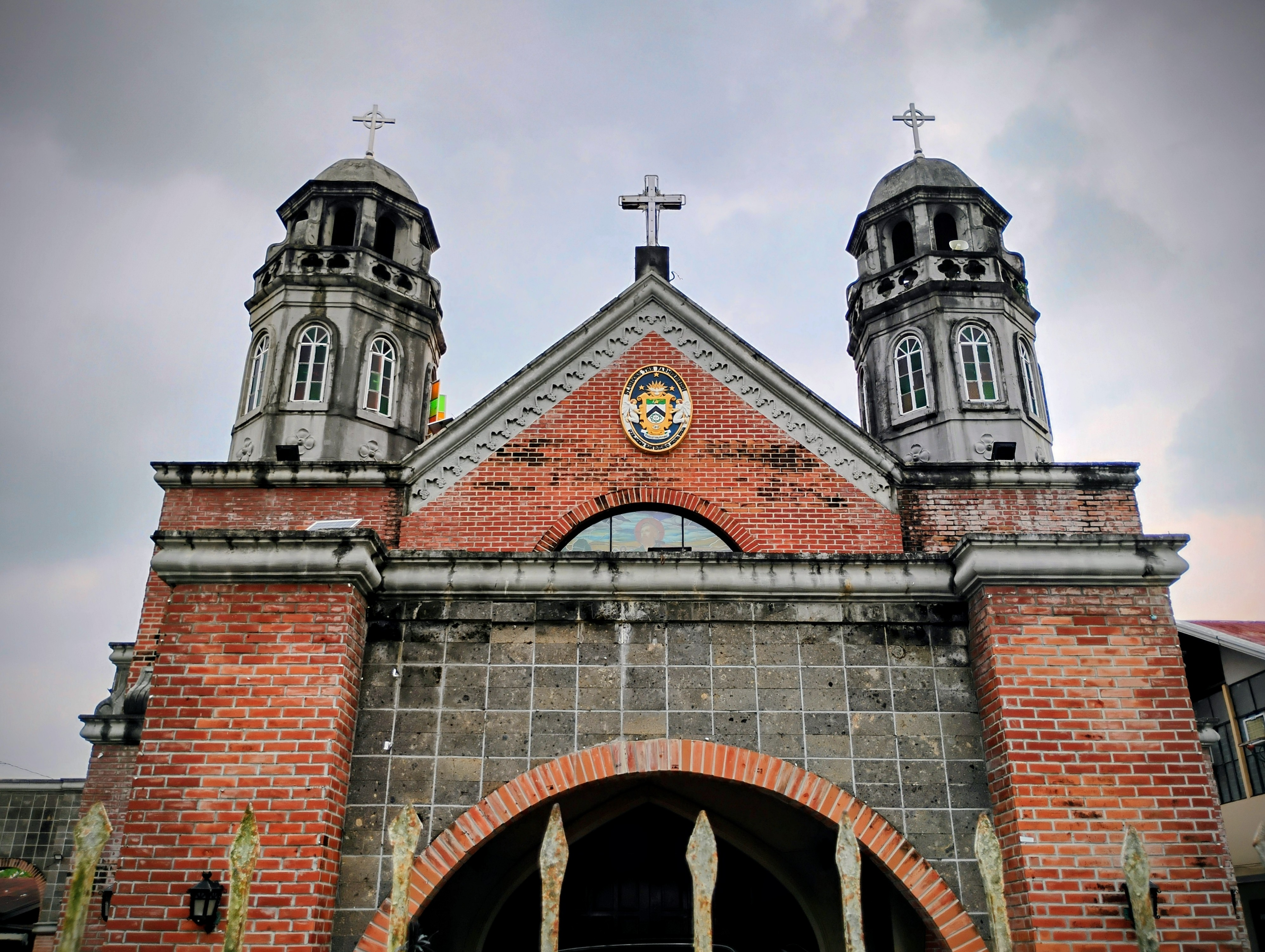
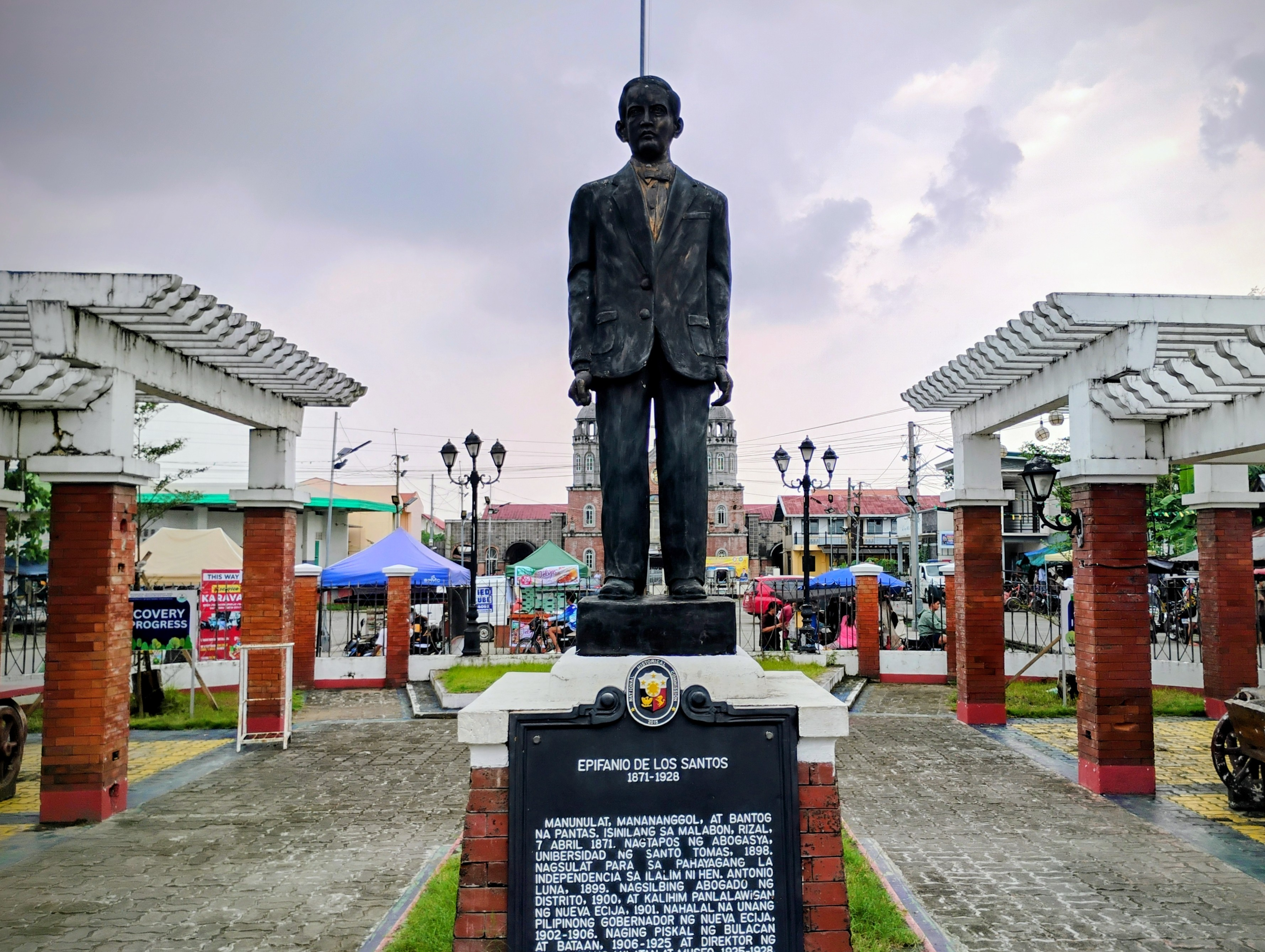
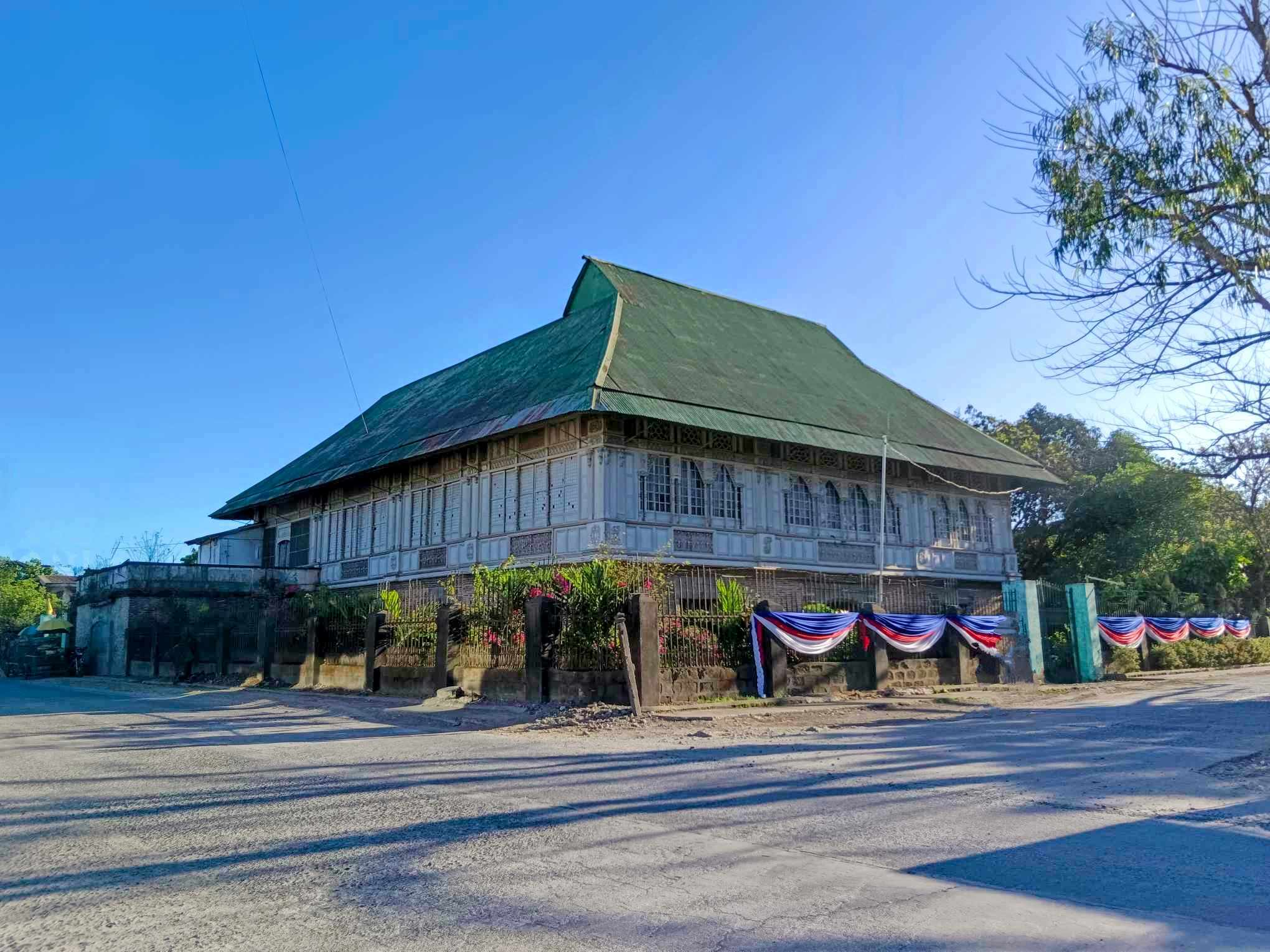
- San Isidro Municipal Hall Saint Isidore the Farmer Parish Church Epifanio de los Santos Monument Crispulo Sideco House

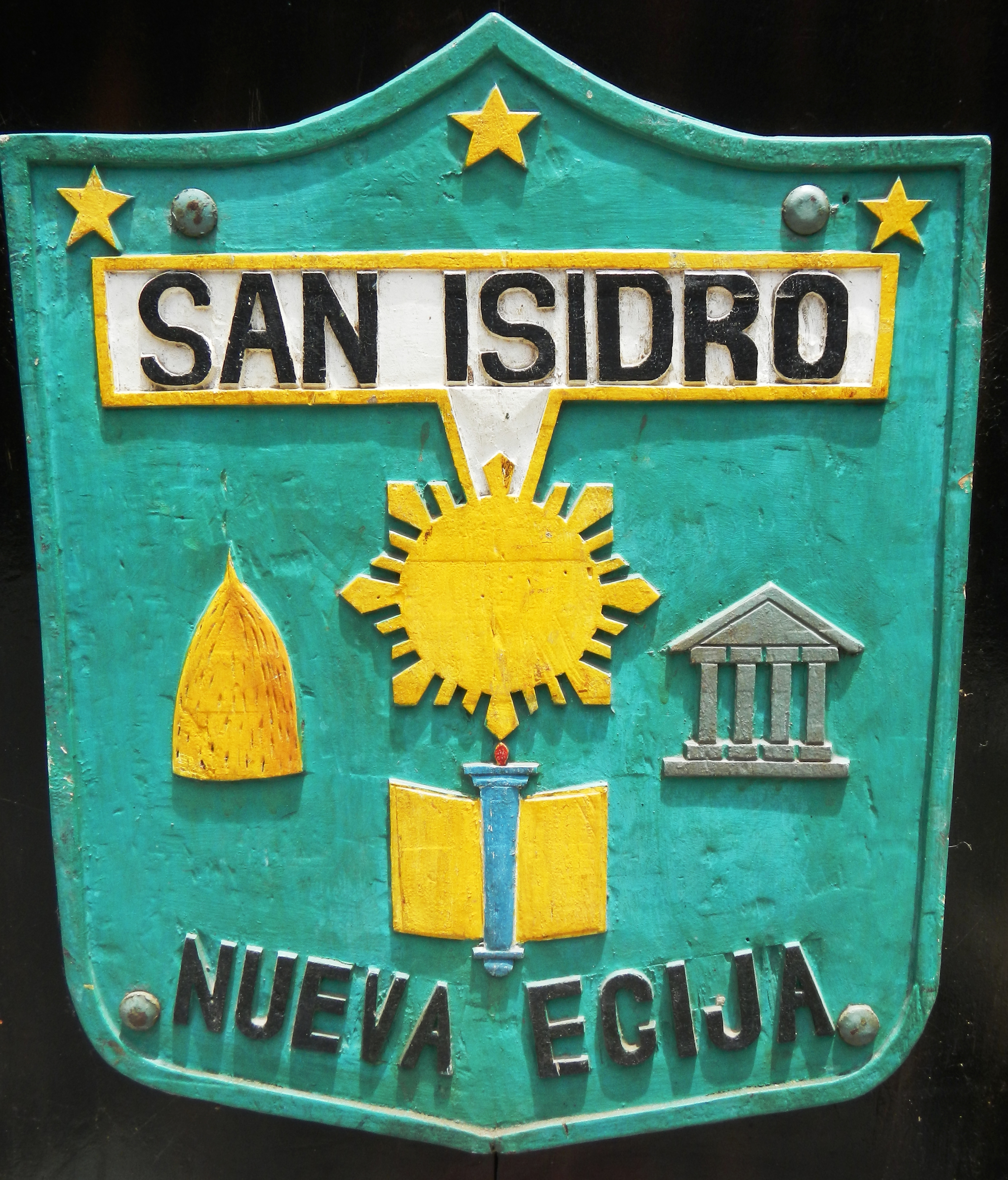
- Seal

- Map of Nueva Ecija with San Isidro highlighted
- Interactive map of San Isidro
- Location within the Philippines
- Coordinates: 15°18′35″N 120°54′25″E
- Country: Philippines
- Region: Central Luzon
- Province: Nueva Ecija
- District: 4th district
- Named for: St. Isidore the Laborer
- Barangays: 9 (see Barangays)

Government
  - Type: Sangguniang Bayan
  - Mayor: Cesario Dong I. Lopez Jr.
  - Vice Mayor: Robinson DC. Francisco
  - Representative: Emerson D. Pascual
  - Municipal Council: Members: Maria Czarina B. Velasco-Taberna; Noel V. Lorenzo; Archie N. Napao; Paul Andrew L. Franco; Jayson Y. Cablao; Dante M. Dela Cruz; Carlos M. Francisco; Pamela P. Magno
  - Electorate: 34,638 voters (2025)

Area
  - Total: 56.49 km^{2} (21.81 sq mi)
- Elevation: 21 m (69 ft)
- Highest elevation: 35 m (115 ft)
- Lowest elevation: 12 m (39 ft)

Population (2024 census)
  - Total: 55,108
  - Density: 975.5/km^{2} (2,527/sq mi)
  - Households: 12,828

Economy
  - Income class: 1st municipal income class
  - Poverty incidence: 10.24% (2023)
  - Revenue: ₱ 237.6 million (2024)
  - Assets: ₱ 825.1 million (2024)
  - Expenditure: ₱ 220.3 million (2024)
  - Liabilities: ₱ 332.1 million (2024)

Service provider
  - Electricity: Nueva Ecija 1 Electric Cooperative (NEECO 1)
- Time zone: UTC+8 (PST)
- ZIP code: 3106
- PSGC: 0304925000
- IDD : area code: +63 (0)44
- Native languages: Kapampangan; Tagalog; Ilocano

San Isidro, officially the Municipality of San Isidro (Tagalog: Bayan ni San Isidro, Kapampangan: Balen ning San Isidro), is a municipality in the province of Nueva Ecija, Philippines. According to the 2024 census, it has a population of 55,108 people.

It became the capital of the Philippines during the First Philippine Republic when President Emilio Aguinaldo was moving north to avoid being captured by American forces. This municipality also has the first high school in the Philippines outside Manila

== History ==
San Isidro, along with Gapan, Aliaga, Cabiao, and San Antonio were parts of Pampanga until they were transferred to Nueva Ecija in 1848. It served as the capital of Nueva Ecija from 1852 to 1912. After the first cry against the Spanish colonial government was made in 1896, there were 2,000 revolutionary soldiers under General Mariano Llanera who besieged San Isidro.

On March 29, 1899, General Emilio Aguinaldo declared San Isidro as the capital of the Philippines after the revolutionary capital Malolos was captured by the Americans. However, this was short-lived. General Frederick Funston planned the capture of Aguinaldo to end the Philippine–American War in San Isidro.

The Wright Institute, established in 1903 in San Isidro, was the first high school established outside Manila during the American period.

The town was occupied by Japanese troops in 1942, during World War II. The combined U.S. and Philippine Commonwealth ground forces liberated San Isidro and defeated the Japanese forces in 1945.

=== Contemporary period ===
On September 11, 1989, Mayor Enrique Lorenzo was on his way back from Manila with his wife Aurora, their driver, and one of their security personnel when they were ambushed by four gunmen along the Santa Mesa Bridge in Manila. Aurora and two other companions died from their gunshot wounds while Mayor Lorenzo with only injuries to his left shoulder.

== Geography ==
The municipality is bounded by Gapan to the east, the municipalities of San Leonardo and Jaen to the north, San Antonio to the west, Cabiao to the south-west, San Miguel, Bulacan, to the southeast and Candaba, Pampanga, to the south. It is 29 kilometers (18 mi) from Cabanatuan, 43 kilometers (27 mi) from Palayan, and 99 kilometers (62 mi) from Manila.

=== Barangays ===
San Isidro is divided into nine barangays, as shown below. Each barangay consists of puroks and some have sitios.

- Alua
- Calaba
- Malapit
- Mangga
- Poblacion
- Pulo
- San Roque
- Santo Cristo
- Tabon

=== Climate ===
Climate data for San Isidro, Nueva Ecija
| Month | Jan | Feb | Mar | Apr | May | Jun | Jul | Aug | Sep | Oct | Nov | Dec | Year |
|---|---|---|---|---|---|---|---|---|---|---|---|---|---|
| Mean daily maximum °C (°F) | 29 (84) | 30 (86) | 31 (88) | 34 (93) | 33 (91) | 31 (88) | 30 (86) | 29 (84) | 29 (84) | 30 (86) | 30 (86) | 29 (84) | 30 (87) |
| Mean daily minimum °C (°F) | 20 (68) | 20 (68) | 20 (68) | 22 (72) | 24 (75) | 24 (75) | 24 (75) | 24 (75) | 24 (75) | 23 (73) | 22 (72) | 21 (70) | 22 (72) |
| Average precipitation mm (inches) | 4 (0.2) | 4 (0.2) | 5 (0.2) | 11 (0.4) | 66 (2.6) | 99 (3.9) | 127 (5.0) | 113 (4.4) | 99 (3.9) | 84 (3.3) | 35 (1.4) | 14 (0.6) | 661 (26.1) |
| Average rainy days | 2.2 | 1.9 | 3.2 | 5.3 | 16.1 | 20.8 | 23.5 | 22.8 | 22.2 | 16.5 | 8.9 | 3.5 | 146.9 |
Source: Meteoblue

== Demographics ==
Population census of San Isidro

| Year | Pop. | ±% p.a. |
|---|---|---|
| 1903 | 9,800 | — |
| 1918 | 9,592 | −0.14% |
| 1939 | 12,078 | +1.10% |
| 1948 | 13,191 | +0.98% |
| 1960 | 16,514 | +1.89% |
| 1970 | 22,128 | +2.97% |
| 1975 | 25,621 | +2.98% |
| 1980 | 28,550 | +2.19% |

| Year | Pop. | ±% p.a. |
|---|---|---|
| 1990 | 34,349 | +1.87% |
| 1995 | 36,283 | +1.03% |
| 2000 | 40,984 | +2.65% |
| 2007 | 44,687 | +1.20% |
| 2010 | 47,800 | +2.48% |
| 2015 | 51,612 | +1.47% |
| 2020 | 54,372 | +1.10% |
| 2024 | 55,108 | +0.32% |

Source: Philippine Statistics Authority

=== Religion ===
Majority of populace is Roman Catholic. Other religious groups have churches and places of worship.

== Economy ==
Poverty incidence of San Isidro (%)

Source: Philippine Statistics Authority

Primarily depends on rice & vegetable farming, poultry and piggery.

As of 2017, based on Commission on Audit of the Philippines, San Isidro reached their income of ₱129,676,820.86; assets of ₱494,469,351.35; liabilities of ₱229,800,110.14 and allotments of ₱135,154,456.00.

== Tourism ==
- Carron Dreampark is an amusement and theme park in Barangay Santo Cristo, and was opened on November 17, 2012.

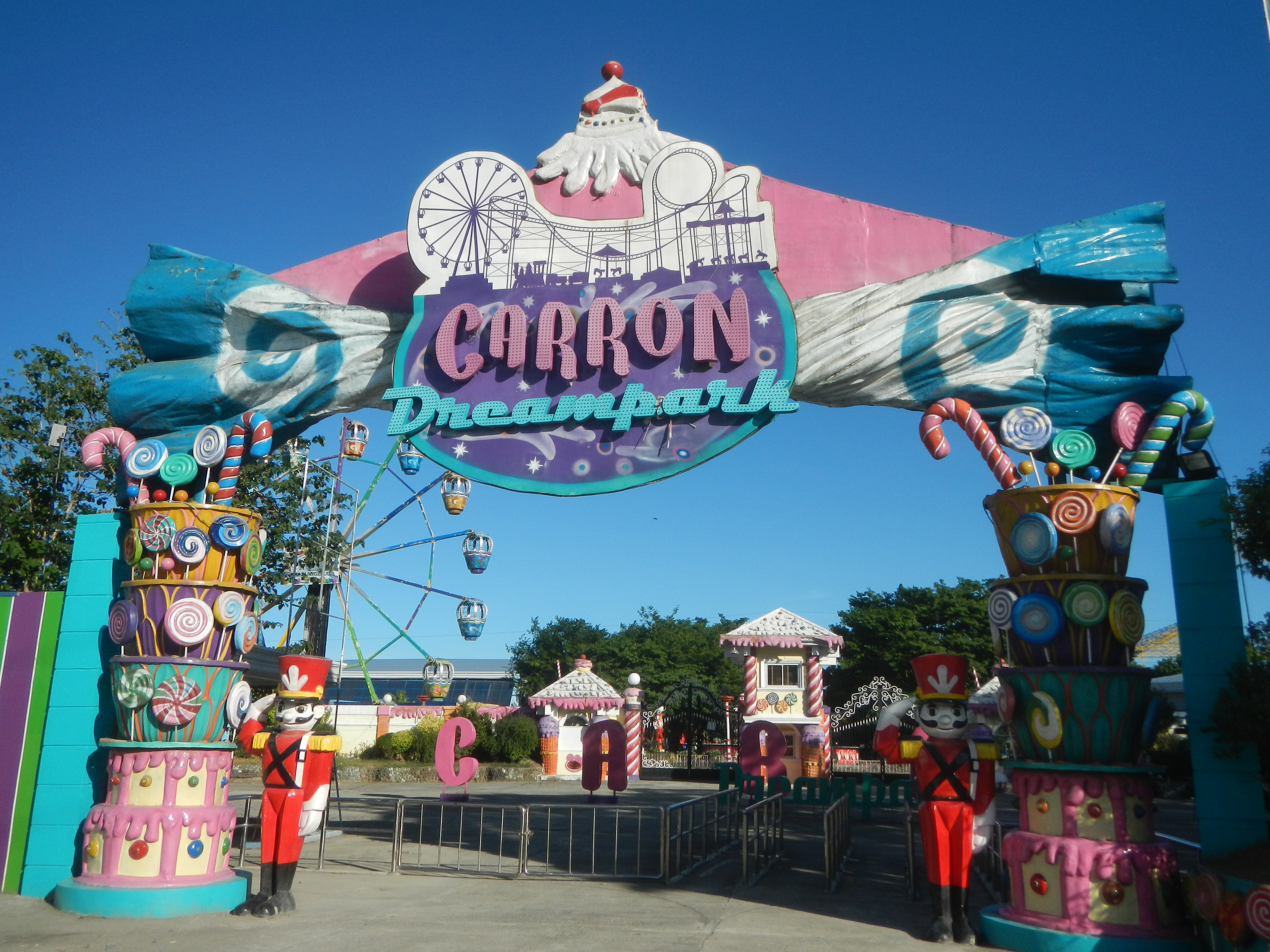
Carron Dreampark

== Education ==
The San Isidro Schools District Office governs all educational institutions within the municipality. It oversees the management and operations of all private and public, from primary to secondary schools.

=== Primary and elementary schools ===
- Alua Elementary School
- Barangka Elementary School
- Calaba Elementary School
- Eng'r. J & F. Vallarta Memorial School
- Good Shepherd Academy
- J. Victoria Montessori School
- Malapit East Elementary School
- Malapit West Elementary School
- Mangga Elementary School
- Nuestra Senora del Carmen Academy (Elementary)
- Pulo Elementary School
- San Isidro Central School
- San Roque Elementary School
- St. Isidore Christian Academy (Elementary)
- Sto. Cristo Elementary School
- Tabon Elementary School

=== Secondary schools ===
- Calaba National High School
- Pulo National High School
- Nuestra Senora del Carmen Academy (High School)
- Nueva Ecija University Science and Technology (High School)
- St. Isidore Christian Academy (High School)
- Teodoro A. Dionisio National High School

=== Higher educational institutions ===
- General de Jesus College: formerly known as General de Jesus Academy, is a private school located in the Poblacion, San Isidro. It was founded in 1946.
- Holy Rosary Colleges Foundation: private school at Calaba, San Isidro.
- Nueva Ecija University of Science and Technology, San Isidro Campus: started as a vocational course at the Wright Institute in San Isidro, where young Filipinos were trained in woodworking and basic telegraphy. This vocational course lasted until S.Y. 1927-1928 when the general secondary education course was transferred to Cabanatuan. On June 9, 1929, the school was renamed Nueva Ecija Trade School (NETS) in accordance with Vocational Education Act 3377 of 1929. The first and only vocational course being offered then was woodworking. That course was an addition to the existing secondary curriculum inherited from the Wright Institute.

== Gallery ==
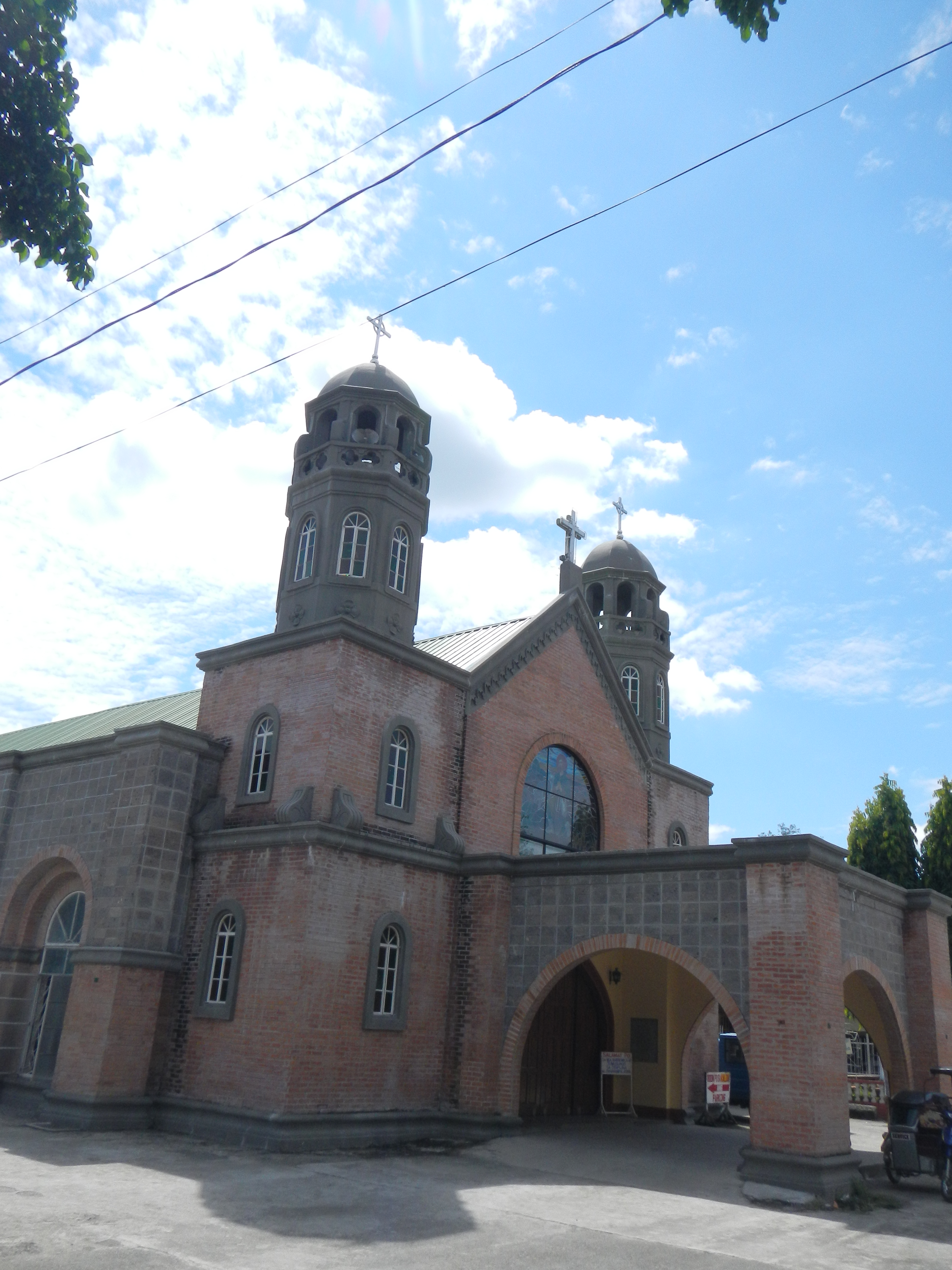
San Isidro Labrador Church

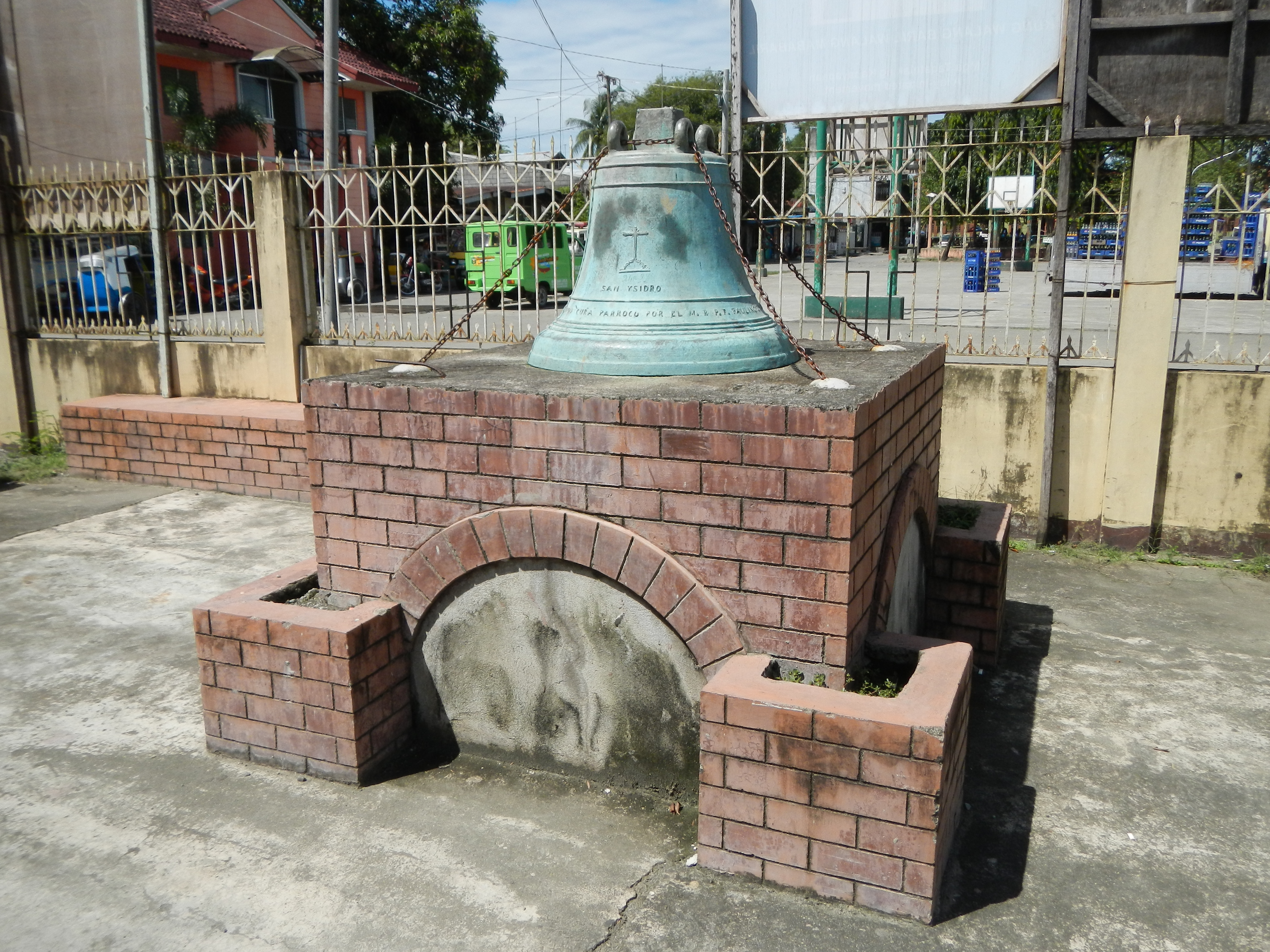
M.R.P.F. Paulino Escalada 1836 bells

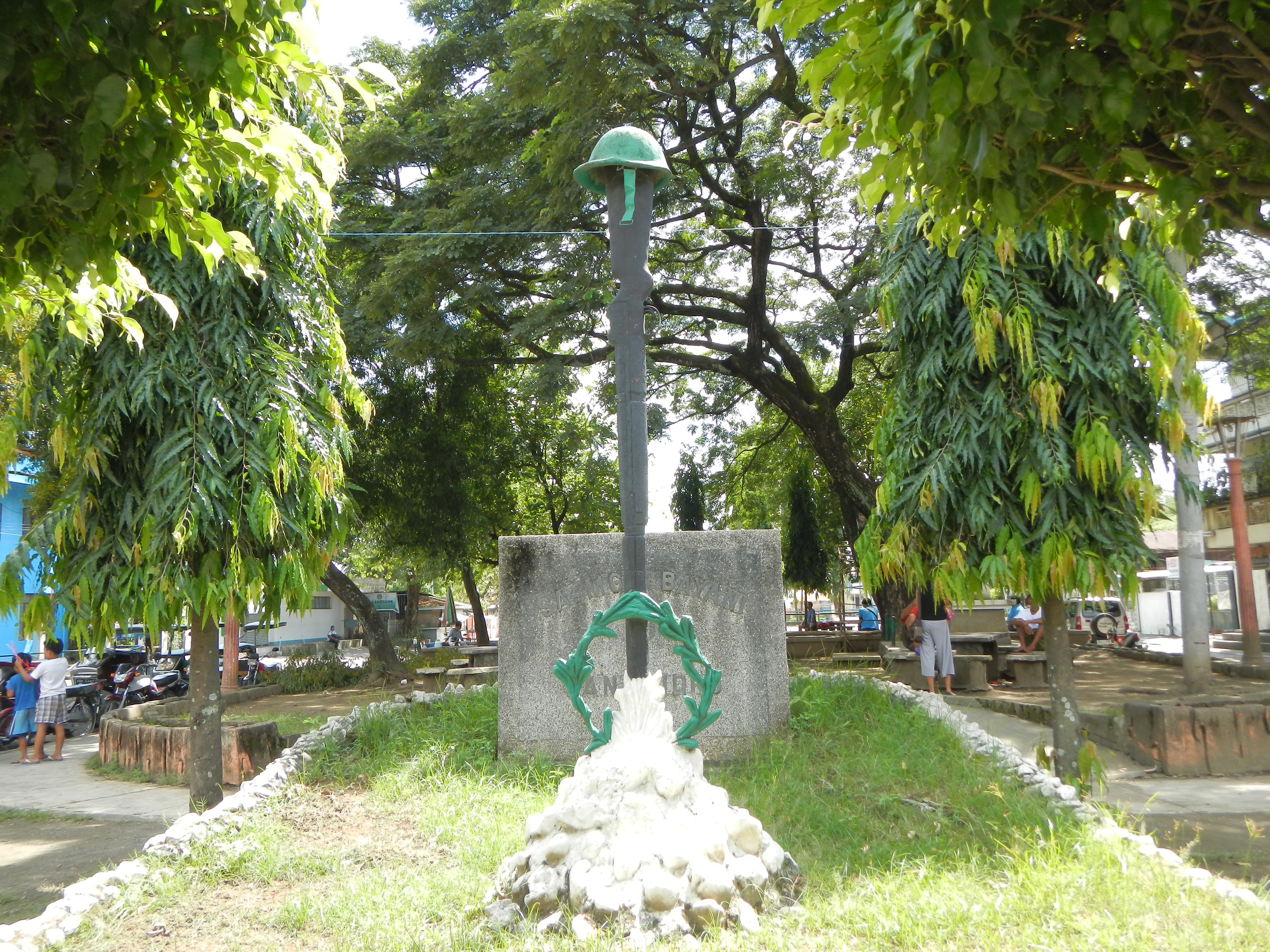
Central Park

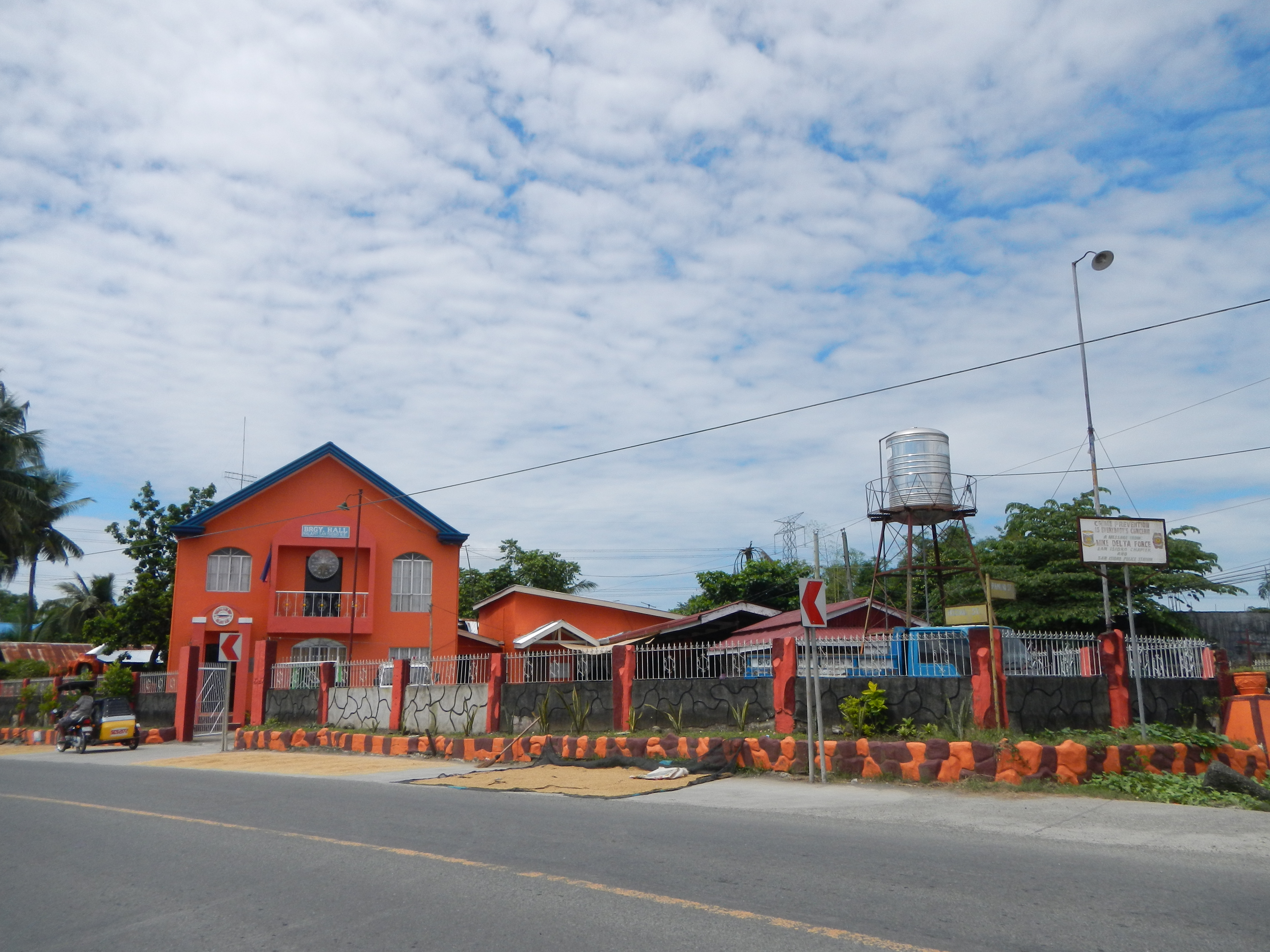
Barangay Malapit Hall

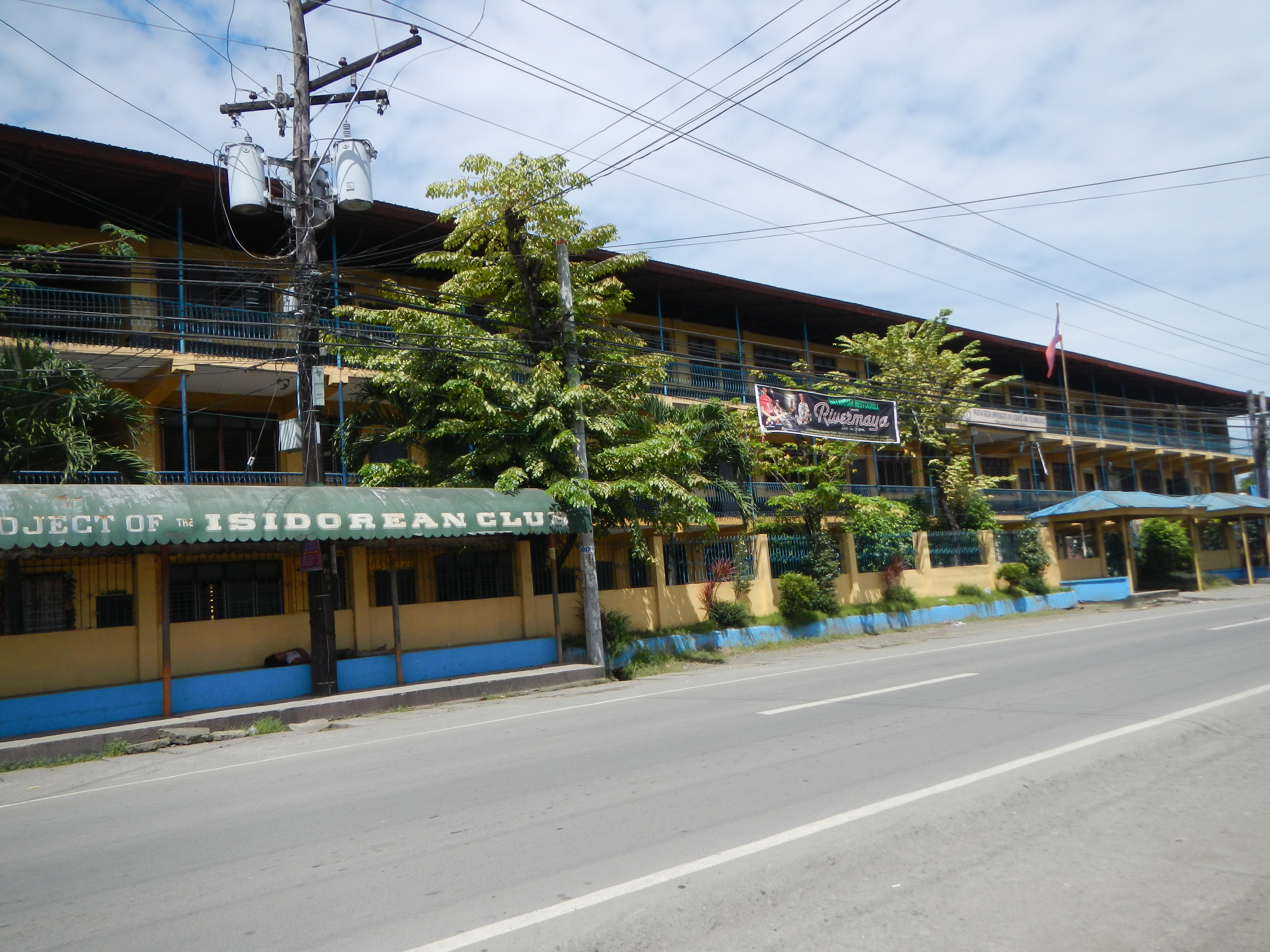
Nueva Ecija University of Science and Technology

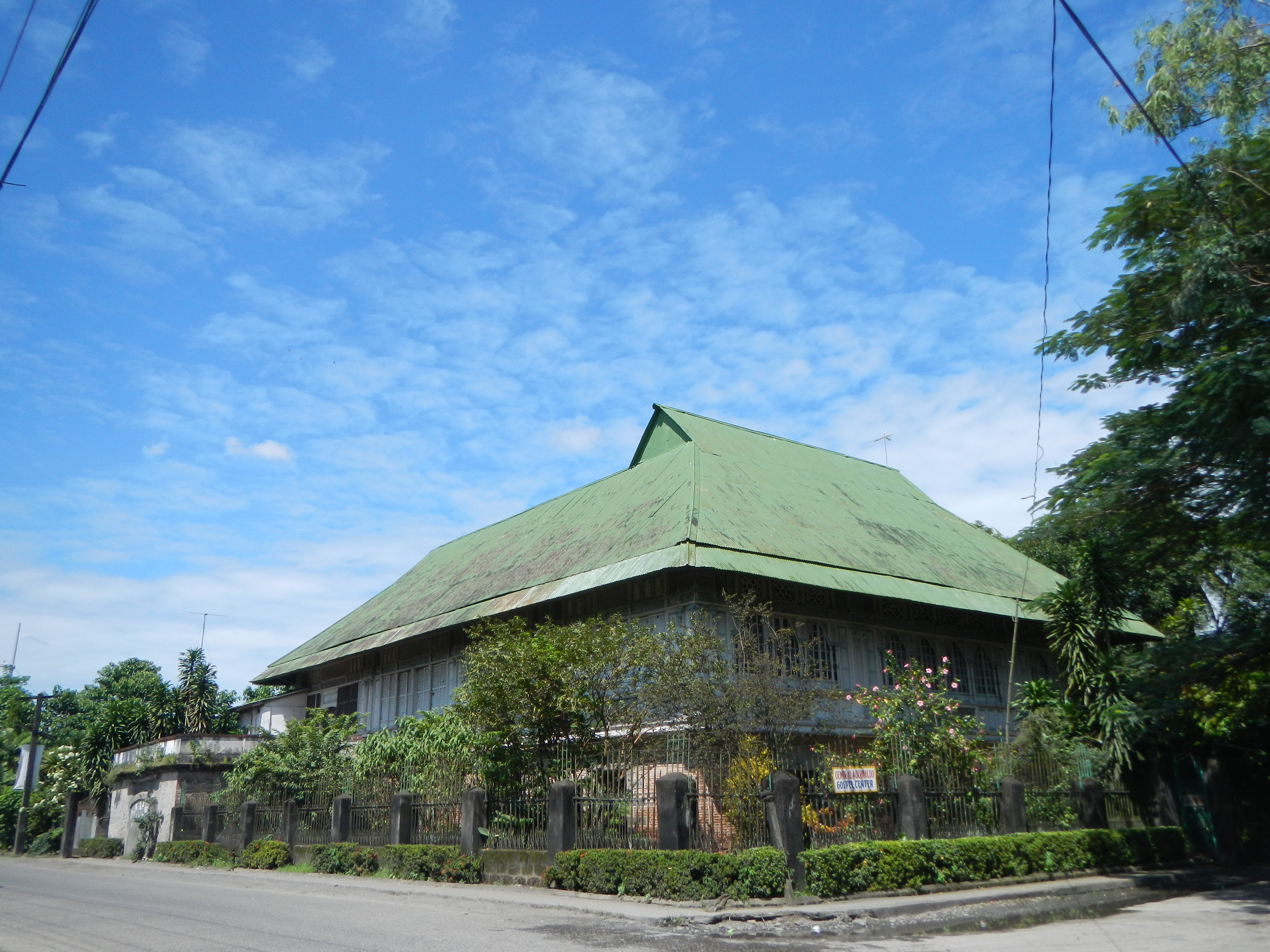
The Crispulo Sideco (also known as Kapitang Pulong) house was built in the 19th century. Built in the Floral period in the Philippine colonial architecture, ogee arches, filigreed wooden panels, grilles wrought in curlicues and floral and foliate designs abound in the house as basic structural elements or as ornaments.

| Preceded by Cabanatuan | Capital of Nueva Ecija; 1852–1912 | Succeeded by Cabanatuan |
