= Joseph Gilbert Violago =

Filipino mechanical engineer and politician (born 1970)

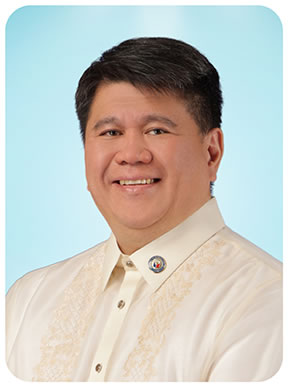
- Official portrait, 2022

Member of the House of Representatives from Nueva Ecija’s 2nd District
- In office June 30, 2022 – June 30, 2025
- Preceded by: Micaela Violago
- Succeeded by: Kokoy Salvador
- In office June 30, 2007 – June 30, 2016
- Preceded by: Eleuterio Violago
- Succeeded by: Micaela Violago

Personal details
- Born: Joseph Gilbert Francisco Violago; February 4, 1970 (age 56)
- Party: NUP (2021–present)
- Other political affiliations: Liberal (2010–2021); Lakas (2007–2010)
- Spouse: Micaela Violago
- Relatives: Kokoy Salvador (brother-in-law)
- Education: De La Salle University (BS)
- Occupation: Politician, mechanical engineer

Joseph Gilbert Francisco Violago (born February 4, 1970) is a Filipino mechanical engineer and politician. He served as representative of the 2nd District of Nueva Ecija in the House of Representatives of the Philippines from 2022 to 2025, a position he previously held from 2007 to 2016.

== Early life and education ==
Violago was born on February 4, 1970 to Eleuterio Violago and Primitiva Francisco. He studied De La Salle University with the degree of mechanical engineering.

== Political career ==
In 2007, Violago was elected as representative of the second district of Nueva Ecija after he succeeded his father. He served for three consecutive terms.

In 2022, Violago returned as representative of the second district of Nueva Ecija after he succeeded his wife until 2025.

== Personal life ==
Violago is married to Micaela Violago, also a representative of the second district of Nueva Ecija from 2016 to 2022 and sister of Kokoy Salvador.

His father, Eleuterio Violago, was a representative of the second district of Nueva Ecija (1992–1998; 2001–2007)

== Electoral history ==
Electoral history of Joseph Gilbert Violago
Year	Office	Party	Votes received				Result
Year	Office	Party	Total	%	P.	Swing	Result
2007	Representative (Nueva Ecija–2nd)	Lakas	84,291	—N/a	1st	—N/a	Won
2010	Representative (Nueva Ecija–2nd)	Lakas	144,507	77.94%	1st	—N/a	Won
2013	Representative (Nueva Ecija–2nd)	Liberal	133,155	77.72%	1st	—N/a	Unopposed
2022	Representative (Nueva Ecija–2nd)	NUP	116,099	47.79%	1st	—N/a	Won
