= Salvador Pleyto =

Filipino politician

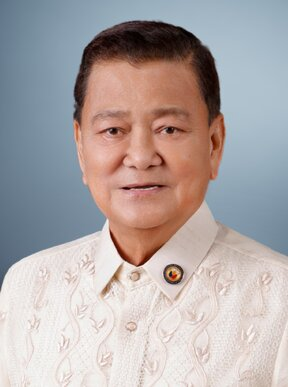
- Official portrait, 2026

Member of the Philippine House of Representatives from Bulacan's 6th congressional district
- Incumbent
- Assumed office June 30, 2022
- Preceded by: District established

Personal details
- Born: Salvador Aquino Pleyto; March 22, 1942 (age 84) Santa Maria, Bulacan, Philippines
- Party: PFP (2026–present)
- Other political affiliations: Lakas (2009–2010; 2022–2026); PDP–Laban (2021–2022)
- Spouse: Miguella Guballa Pleyto
- Children: 4
- Education: University of the Philippines Diliman (BS)
- Occupation: Politician, Engineer
- Nickname: Ador

Salvador Aquino Pleyto Sr. (born March 22, 1942), popularly known as Ador Pleyto, is a Filipino politician, engineer, and executive currently serving as the representative of the 6th district of Bulacan in the House of Representatives of the Philippines since 2022. He is a member of the Partido Federal ng Pilipinas party and previously served as Undersecretary of the Department of Public Works and Highways (DPWH).

== Early life and education ==
Salvador Aquino Pleyto Sr. was born on March 22, 1942, in Santa Maria, Bulacan, Philippines. He earned his Bachelor of Science in Engineering degree from the University of the Philippines Diliman.

== Engineering career ==
Pleyto serves as the president and CEO of S.A. Pleyto Construction Corporation.

== Political career ==
Pleyto served as Undersecretary of the Department of Public Works and Highways (DPWH), where he was involved in major infrastructure projects across the Philippines.

Pleyto began his political career in 2022 when he was elected as the representative of the newly created 6th district of Bulacan under the PDP–Laban party. He later switched to the Lakas–CMD party. As a congressman, he has focused on infrastructure development, public works, and local governance. He has also called for a new act replacing the Building Code of the Philippines. He was re-elected in 2025. He switched to the ruling Partido Federal ng Pilipinas in 2026.

== Legal issues ==
In November 2007, Pleyto was acquitted by the Supreme Court of charges of gross misconduct and dishonesty related to the alleged falsification of his Statement of Assets, Liabilities, and Net Worth (SALN) from 1999 to 2001 during his tenure as Undersecretary of the Department of Public Works and Highways.

In September 2008, Pleyto was cleared of allegations of unexplained wealth after the Sandiganbayan dismissed the government’s forfeiture case against his family, citing insufficient evidence. The ruling affirmed that the properties and assets in question were legitimately acquired over decades.

In October 2025, Pleyto was flagged by the Anti-Money Laundering Council (AMLC) for receiving funds from contractors Curlee and Sarah Discaya, who have recently been linked to anomalous flood control projects, from 2019 to 2020. As a response, he denied the accusations and called for the disclosure of the AMLC report referenced by Ombudsman Jesus Crispin Remulla, who had announced such findings.

== Personal life ==
Pleyto is married to Miguella Guballa Pleyto. They have three children: Salvador Jr., Mary Grace, and Russel, who served as the mayor of Santa Maria from 2016 to 2022.

== Electoral history ==
Electoral history of Salvador Pleyto
Year	Office	Party	Votes received				Result
Year	Office	Party	Total	%	P.	Swing	Result
2010	Representative (Bulacan–4th)	Lakas–Kampi	27,072	12.28%	2nd	—N/a	Lost
2022	Representative (Bulacan–6th)	PDP–Laban	81,307	37.68%	1st	—N/a	Won
2025	Representative (Bulacan–6th)	Lakas	164,503	100.00%	1st	—N/a	Unopposed
