= Bulacan's 6th congressional district =

House of Representatives of the Philippines legislative district

- Constituency for the House of Representatives of the Philippines
- Boundary of Bulacan's 6th congressional district in Bulacan
- Location of Bulacan within the Philippines
- Province: Bulacan
- Region: Central Luzon
- Population: 491,501 (2020)
- Electorate: 285,359 (2025)
- Major settlements: 3 LGUs: Municipalities; Angat; Norzagaray; Santa Maria
- Area: 453.44 km^{2} (175.07 sq mi)

Current constituency
- Created: 2021
- Representative: Salvador Pleyto
- Political party: PFP
- Congressional bloc: Majority

Bulacan's 6th congressional district is one of the seven congressional districts of the Philippines in the province of Bulacan. It has been represented in the House of Representatives since 2022. The district consists of municipalities in southcentral and eastern Bulacan, namely: Angat, Norzagaray, and Santa Maria. It is currently represented in the 20th Congress by Salvador A. Pleyto of the Partido Federal ng Pilipinas (PFP).

== Representation history ==
#	Member		Term of office		Congress	Party	Electoral history	Constituent LGUs
#	Image	Name	Start	End	Congress	Party	Electoral history	Constituent LGUs
=== Bulacan's 6th district for the House of Representatives of the Philippines ===
District created May 27, 2021.
1		Salvador A. Pleyto	June 30, 2022	Incumbent	19th	PDP–Laban	Elected in 2022.	2022–present Angat, Norzagaray, Santa Maria
1		Salvador A. Pleyto	June 30, 2022	Incumbent	20th	Lakas	Re-elected in 2025.	2022–present Angat, Norzagaray, Santa Maria
1		Salvador A. Pleyto	June 30, 2022	Incumbent	20th	PFP	Re-elected in 2025.	2022–present Angat, Norzagaray, Santa Maria

== Election results ==
=== 2025 ===
2025 Philippine House of Representatives election in Bulacan's 6th District
Party	Candidate	Votes	%
Lakas	Salvador Pleyto	164,503	100
Total votes		164,503	100
Lakas hold			

=== 2022 ===
2022 Philippine House of Representatives election in Bulacan's 6th District
Party	Candidate	Votes	%
PDP–Laban	Salvador Pleyto	81,307	37.67
NUP	Fred Germar	76,430	35.41
Liberal	Kaye Martinez Daly	51,491	23.86
Aksyon	Ramon Carlos Villarama	5,141	2.38
Independent	Jose Mangulabanan	828	0.38
Independent	Ernesto Padernos	595	0.27
Total votes		215,972	100
PDP–Laban win (new seat)			

== See also ==
- Legislative districts of Bulacan
