= Maria Angela Garcia =

Filipina politician (born 1968)

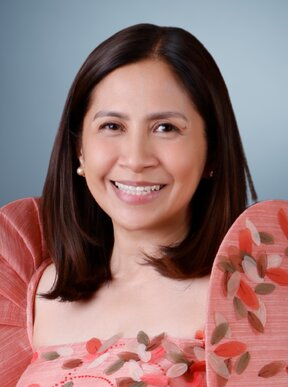
- Official portrait, 2025

Member of the Philippine House of Representatives from Bataan's 3rd District
- Incumbent
- Assumed office June 30, 2022
- Preceded by: Position created

Mayor of Dinalupihan
- In office July 1, 2013 – June 30, 2022
- Preceded by: Joel Payumo
- Succeeded by: German Santos, Jr.

Personal details
- Born: Maria Angela Sandejas; February 17, 1968 (age 58) Sampaloc, Manila, Philippines
- Party: NUP (2012–present); Partido Balikatan ng Bataan (local party)
- Relations: Albert Garcia (brother); Joet Garcia (brother)
- Parent(s): Tet Garcia (father); Victoria Sandejas (mother)
- Education: University of the Philippines Diliman (BSBA)
- Occupation: Politician

Maria Angela "Gila" Sandejas Garcia (born February 17, 1968) is a Filipina politician and a representative for Bataan's 3rd congressional district for the Philippine House of Representatives.

== Education ==
She graduated from high school and college from St. Scholastica's College and gained a degree in business administration from the University of the Philippines Diliman.

== Career ==
From 1989 to 2007, she was a board member of the Subic Bay Metropolitan Authority. She then was a consultant for the provincial government of Bataan from 2007 to 2010, and then later became the president of the League of Municipalities of the Philippines – Bataan Chapter from 2007 to 2013. She was elected as a representative under the National Unity Party (Philippines).
