= Gapan =

Component city in Nueva Ecija, Philippines

- Component city
- City of Gapan
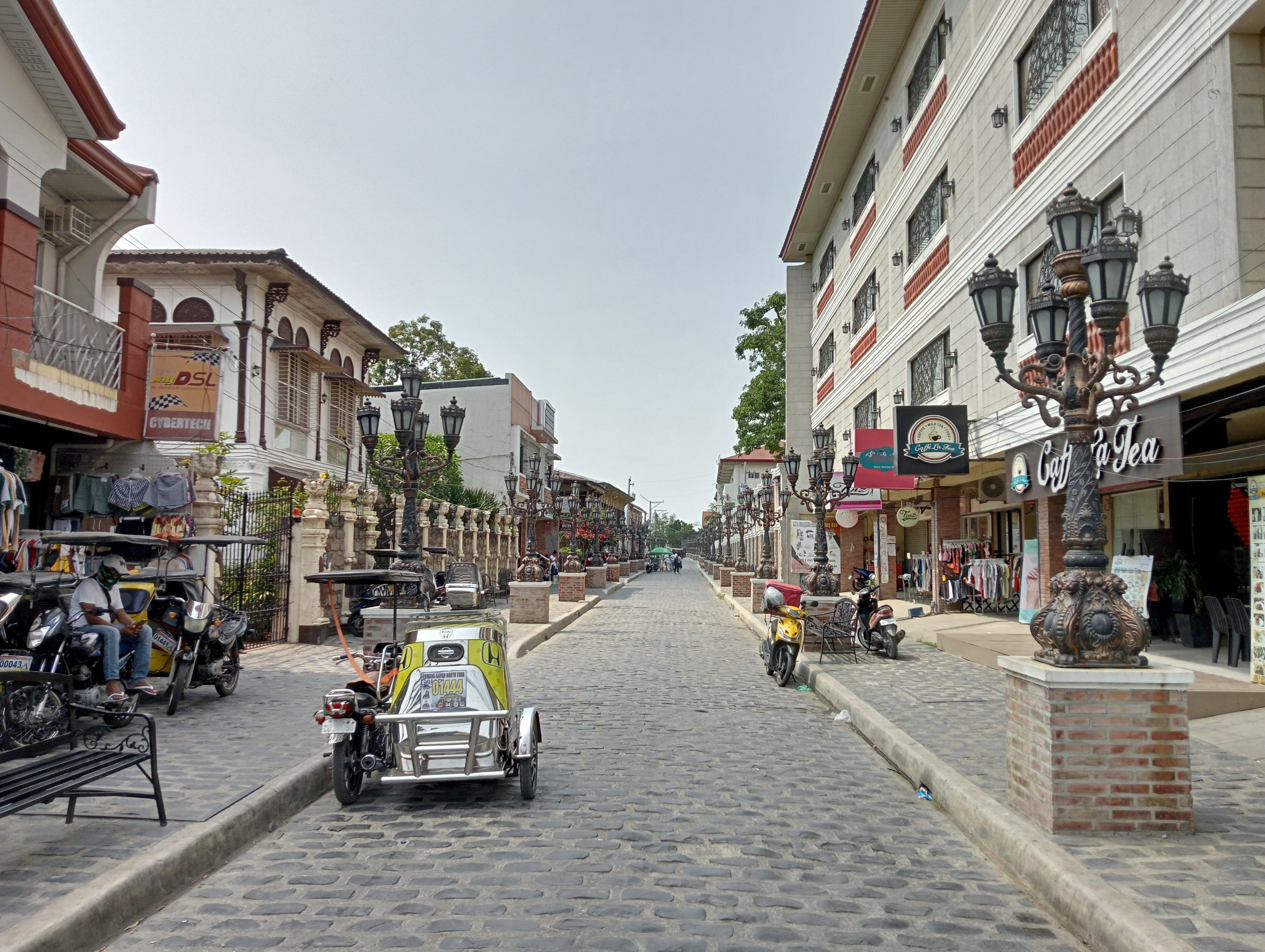
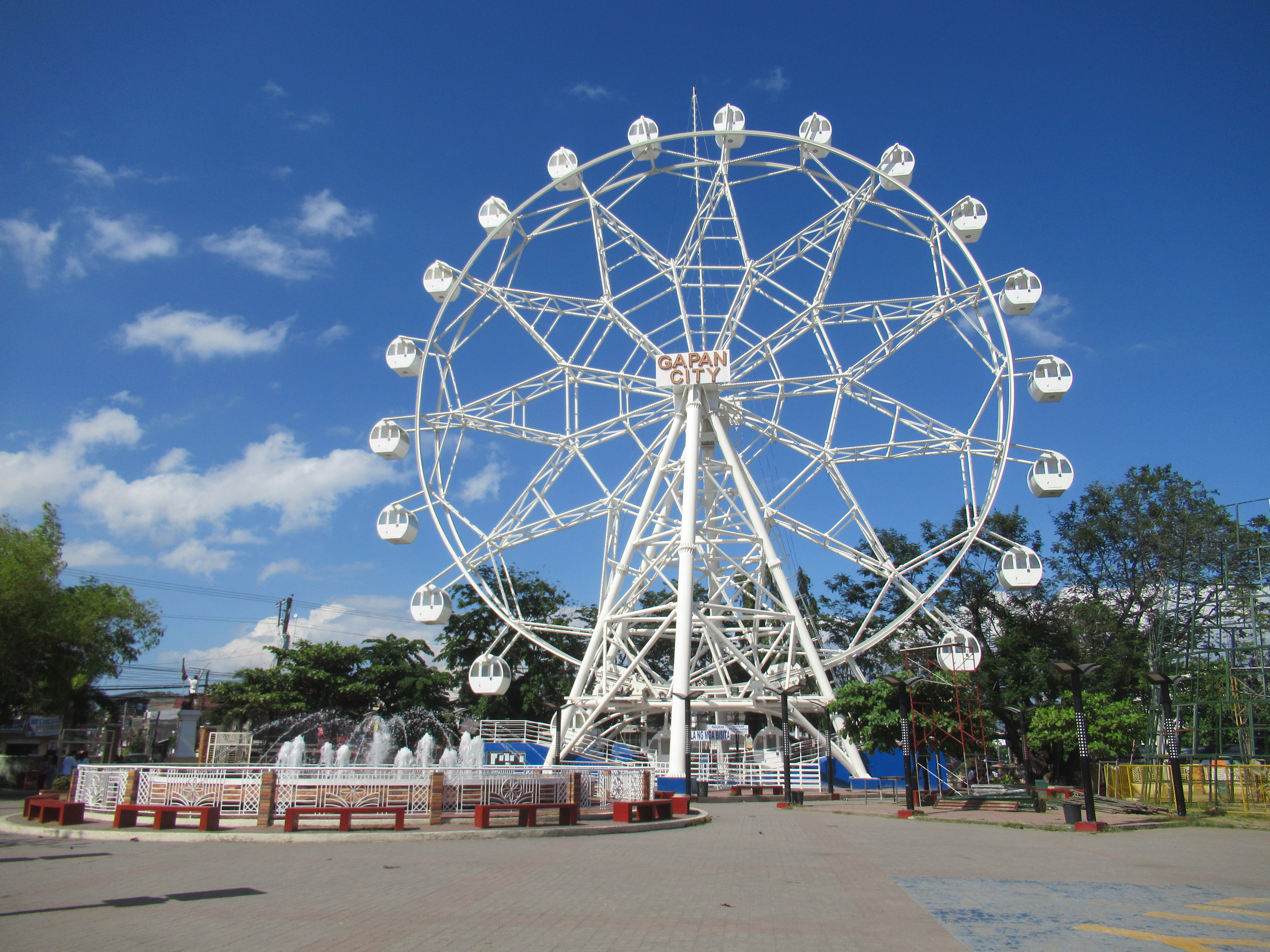
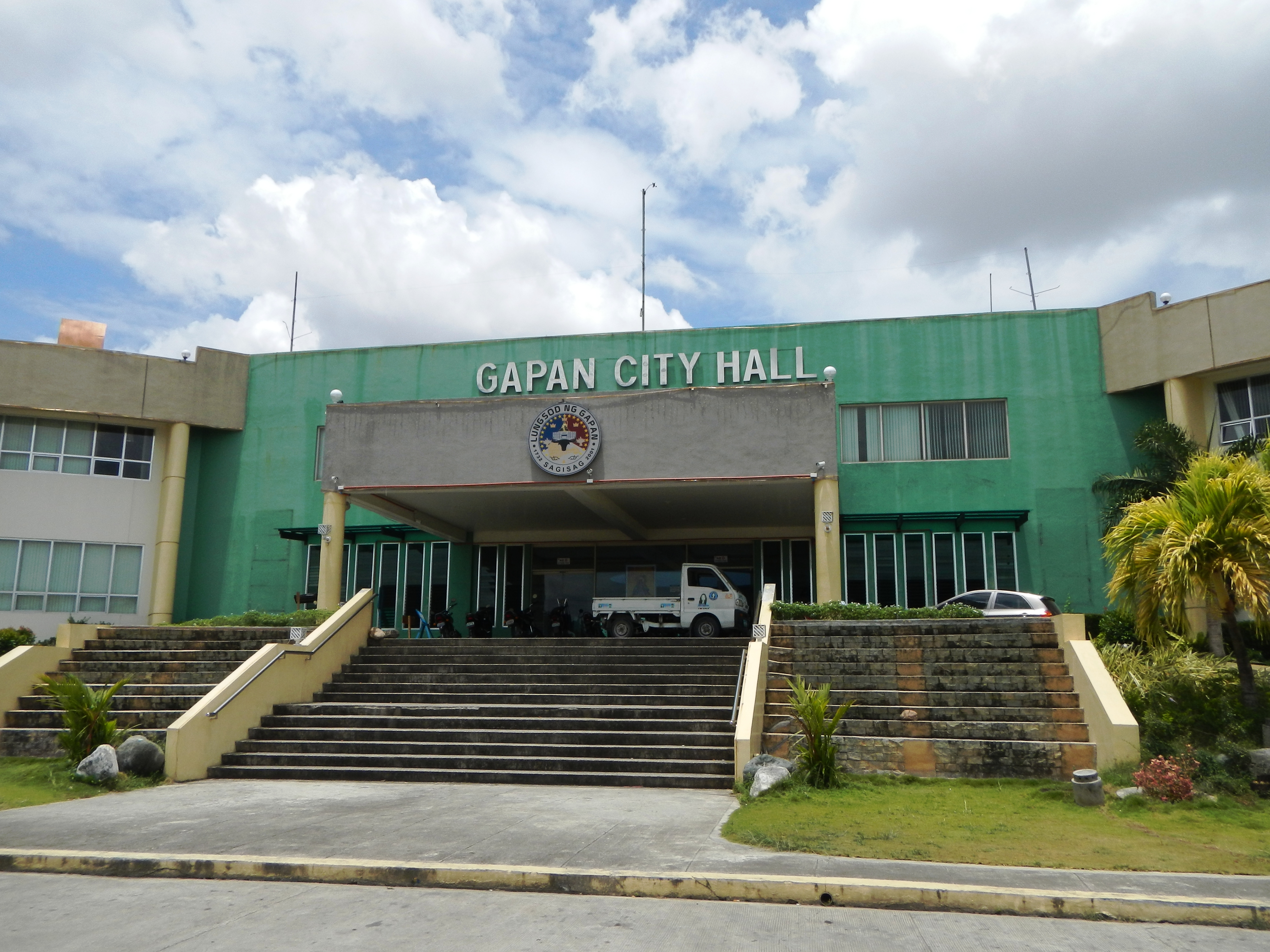
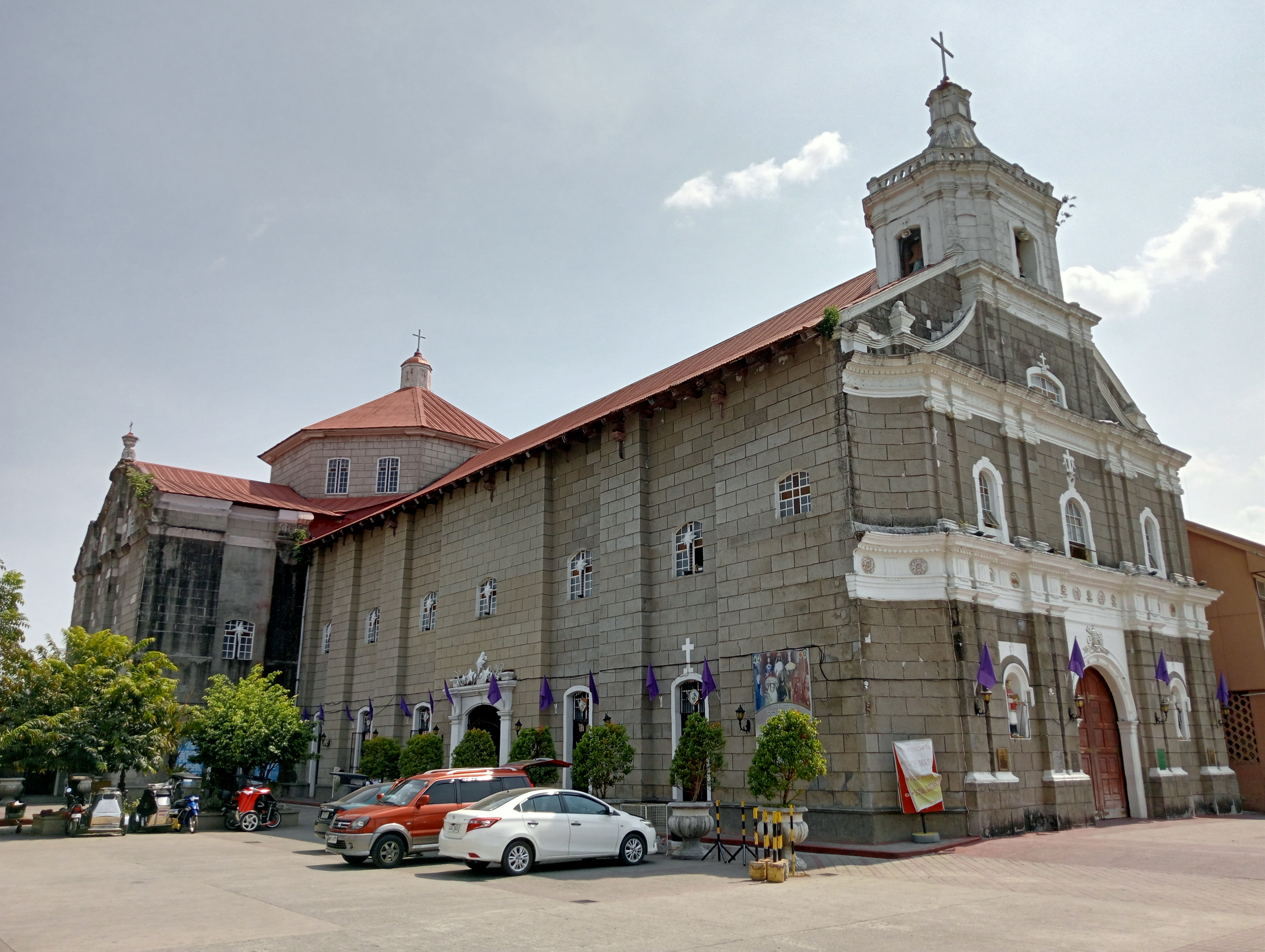
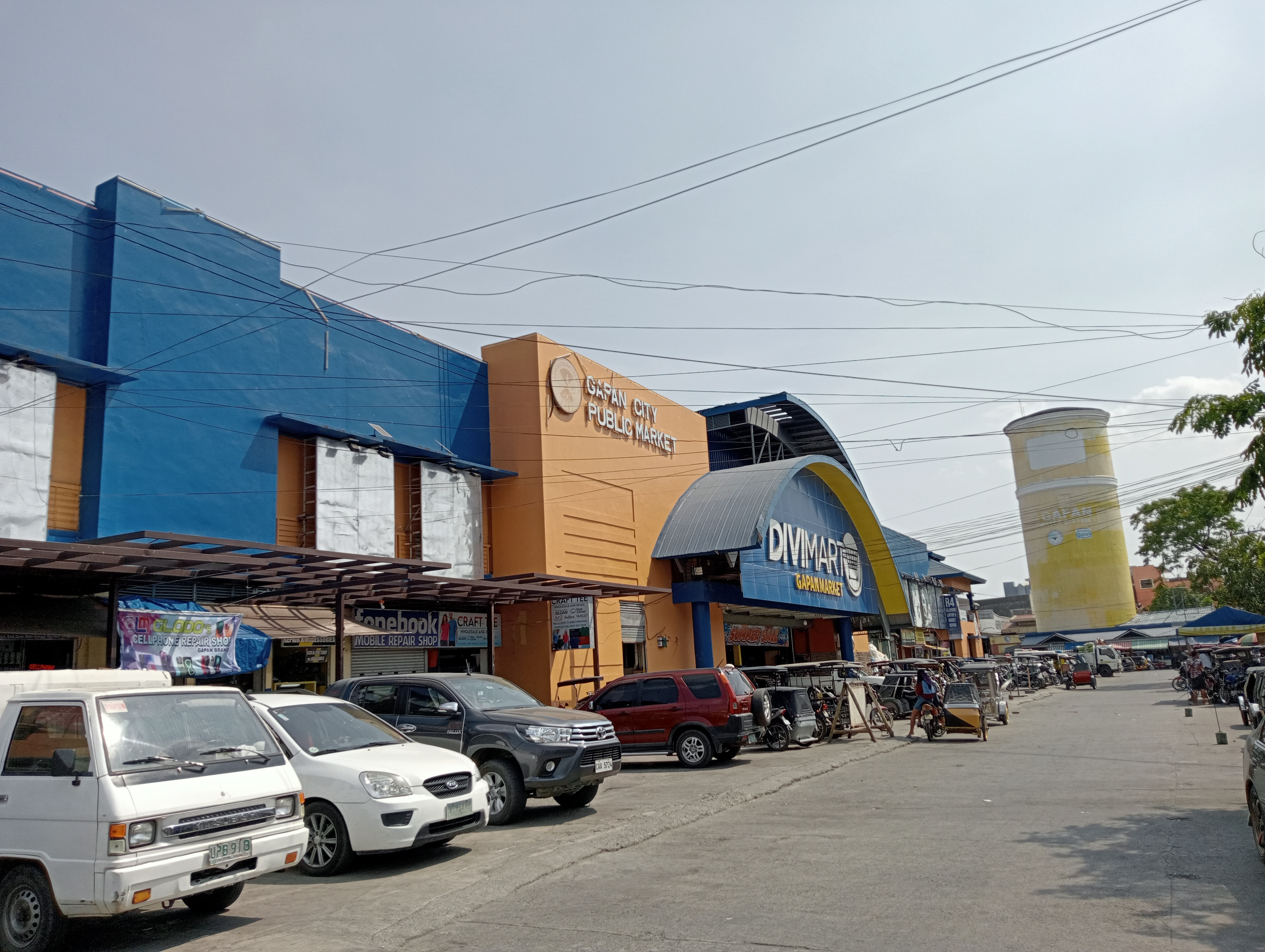
- (From top, left to right): Lumang Gapan • Gapan City Ferris Wheel • Gapan City Public Market • La Divina Pastora National Shrine • Gapan City Hall

- Seal
- Nickname: Tsinelas Capital of the Philippines
- Map of Nueva Ecija with Gapan highlighted
- Interactive map of Gapan
- Location within the Philippines
- Coordinates: 15°18′44″N 120°56′56″E
- Country: Philippines
- Region: Central Luzon
- Province: Nueva Ecija
- District: 4th district
- Founded: 1732
- Cityhood: August 25, 2001
- Barangays: 23 (see Barangays)

Government
  - Type: Sangguniang Panlungsod
  - Mayor: Emary Joy David Pascual
  - Vice Mayor: Maximus Rodrigo P. Howley
  - Representative: Emerson D. Pascual
  - City Council: Members: Jeffrey D. Bautista; Jay Mariano; Gemma Pangilinan; Nani Yu; Idol Tecson; Gerry Matias; Amy Hernandez; Tarat De Guzman; Omeng Bautista; Ser Padiernos
  - Electorate: 96,721 voters (2025)

Area
  - Total: 118.00 km^{2} (45.56 sq mi)
- Elevation: 41 m (135 ft)
- Highest elevation: 440 m (1,440 ft)
- Lowest elevation: 6 m (20 ft)

Population (2024 Census)
  - Total: 129,610
  - Density: 1,098.4/km^{2} (2,844.8/sq mi)
  - Households: 30,186
- Demonym: Gapanense/Gapanenses

Economy
  - Income class: 3rd city income class
  - Poverty incidence: 13.99% (2023)
  - Revenue: ₱ 1,065 million (2024)
  - Assets: ₱ 2,971 million (2024)
  - Expenditure: ₱ 949.4 million (2024)
  - Liabilities: ₱ 1,026 million (2024)

Service provider
  - Electricity: Nueva Ecija 1 Electric Cooperative (NEECO 1)
- Time zone: UTC+8 (PST)
- ZIP code: 3105
- PSGC: 034908000
- IDD : area code: +63 (0)44
- Native languages: Kapampangan; Tagalog; Ilocano
- Website: www.cityofgapan.gov.ph

Gapan [gɐˈpan], officially the City of Gapan (Filipino: Lungsod ng Gapan, Ilocano: Siudad ti Gapan, Kapampangan: Ciudad/Lakanbalen ning Gapan), is a component city in the province of Nueva Ecija, Philippines. According to the 2024 census, it has a population of 129,610 people.

It is nicknamed the "Footwear Capital of the North" due to the thriving footwear making industry in the city.

== History ==
=== Precolonial era ===
Historical records called the town Ibon, which in the 16th century was a town of Pampanga.

=== Spanish colonial era ===
During Spanish rule, in 1595, Gapan was reinstituted as a Catholic town by the Spanish priests Contres Tendilla, Caballo, and Salazar. This makes Gapan the oldest town in Nueva Ecija and one of the oldest in the Philippines. The town had a large jurisdiction embracing an area as far as Cabanatuan to the north (which was its barangay with the name Cabanatuan before it separated in 1750); the Sierra Madre to the east; San Miguel, Bulacan to the south; and, Candaba, Pampanga to the west.

Most of the original settlers in Gapan were Tagalogs from Bulacan and Morong (now Rizal Province) and Kapampangans. Other early settlers came from Ilocos and Tayabas (now Quezon Province). Gapan, along with Aliaga, Cabiao, San Antonio, and San Isidro, was transferred to the province of Nueva Ecija in 1848.

=== After the Philippine declaration of independence ===
After the 1898 Philippine independence, some of the town's former districts became separate towns until what remained comprised only what are now the towns of Peñaranda, General Tinio, and San Leonardo (formerly called Manikling), all of which are part of Nueva Ecija.

=== Gapan massacre ===
February 12, 1982 saw one of the prominent human rights abuses of the Marcos dictatorship in the form of the "Gapan massacre", in which armed soldiers strafed the residence of the Bautista family in the town, resulting in the death of the Bautista couple and all three of their children.

=== Cityhood ===
By virtue of Republic Act No. 9022 and its ratification in a plebiscite subsequently held on August 25, 2001, Gapan was converted into a component city of Nueva Ecija. Ernesto L. Natividad became the first city mayor of Gapan.

== Languages ==
Tagalog is the main language in Gapan. Kapampangan and Ilocano are also used.

== Geography ==
Gapan is located in the southern part of the province. It is bounded to the north by Peñaranda and San Leonardo, to the east by the Gen. Tinio, to the south by San Miguel in neighboring Bulacan province, and to the west by San Isidro.

Gapan is 23 kilometers (14 mi) from Cabanatuan, 37 kilometers (23 mi) from Palayan, and 93 kilometers (58 mi) from Manila.

=== Barangays of Gapan City, Nueva Ecija ===
Gapan is politically subdivided into 23 barangays. Each barangay consists of puroks, and some have sitios.

Name of barangay	Population
Bayanihan	6,629
Bulak	2,776
Kapalangan	6,108
Mahipon	2,821
Malimba	4,170
Mangino	13,618
Marelo	2,138
Pambuan	15,993
Parcutela	1,273
San Lorenzo	6,934
San Nicolas	12,360
San Roque	9,574
San Vicente	9,304
Santa Cruz	3,991
Santo Cristo Norte	6,234
Santo Cristo Sur	4,917
Santo Niño	5,455
Makabaclay (Makabaklay)	2,901
Balante	2,031
Bungo	2,840
Mabunga	878
Maburak	4,086
Putting Tubig	2,579
Total Population : 129,610

== Demographics ==
Population census of Gapan

Year	Pop.	±% p.a.
1903	11,278	—
1918	13,617	+1.26%
1939	23,324	+2.60%
1948	25,719	+1.09%
1960	32,514	+1.97%
1970	45,426	+3.40%

Year	Pop.	±% p.a.
1975	50,506	+2.15%
1980	60,014	+3.51%
1990	70,489	+1.62%
1995	77,735	+1.85%
2000	89,199	+2.99%
2007	98,795	+1.42%

Year	Pop.	±% p.a.
2010	101,488	+0.98%
2015	110,303	+1.60%
2020	122,968	+2.31%
2024	129,610	+1.27%

Source: Philippine Statistics Authority

== Climate ==
Climate data for Gapan, Nueva Ecija
Month	Jan	Feb	Mar	Apr	May	Jun	Jul	Aug	Sep	Oct	Nov	Dec	Year
Mean daily maximum °C (°F)	28 (82)	30 (86)	31 (88)	33 (91)	33 (91)	31 (88)	30 (86)	29 (84)	29 (84)	30 (86)	30 (86)	29 (84)	30 (86)
Mean daily minimum °C (°F)	20 (68)	20 (68)	20 (68)	22 (72)	24 (75)	24 (75)	24 (75)	24 (75)	24 (75)	23 (73)	22 (72)	21 (70)	22 (72)
Average precipitation mm (inches)	4 (0.2)	4 (0.2)	5 (0.2)	11 (0.4)	66 (2.6)	99 (3.9)	127 (5.0)	113 (4.4)	99 (3.9)	84 (3.3)	35 (1.4)	14 (0.6)	661 (26.1)
Average rainy days	2.2	1.9	3.2	5.3	16.1	20.8	23.5	22.8	22.2	16.5	8.9	3.5	146.9
Source: Meteoblue(modeled/calculated data, not measured locally)

== Economy ==
Poverty incidence of Gapan (%)

Source: Philippine Statistics Authority

=== Commercial and Trade ===
Current major sources of income within Gapan City include agriculture. As a town of Nueva Ecija, majority comes from farming, while fishponds, poultry and piggeries also contribute.

The city of Gapan holds tremendous promise not only in its natural resources but also in its potentials in agri-base industries and in footwear industries which help sustain its virtual role in agricultural and industrial production.

It also generates income in slipper making and commercial establishments. Commercial and trade activities in Gapan are further accelerated by the influx of financing lending institution and new businesses sprouting across the city's main district.

Like its sister city, Cabanatuan, Gapan also houses major shopping hubs in the province.

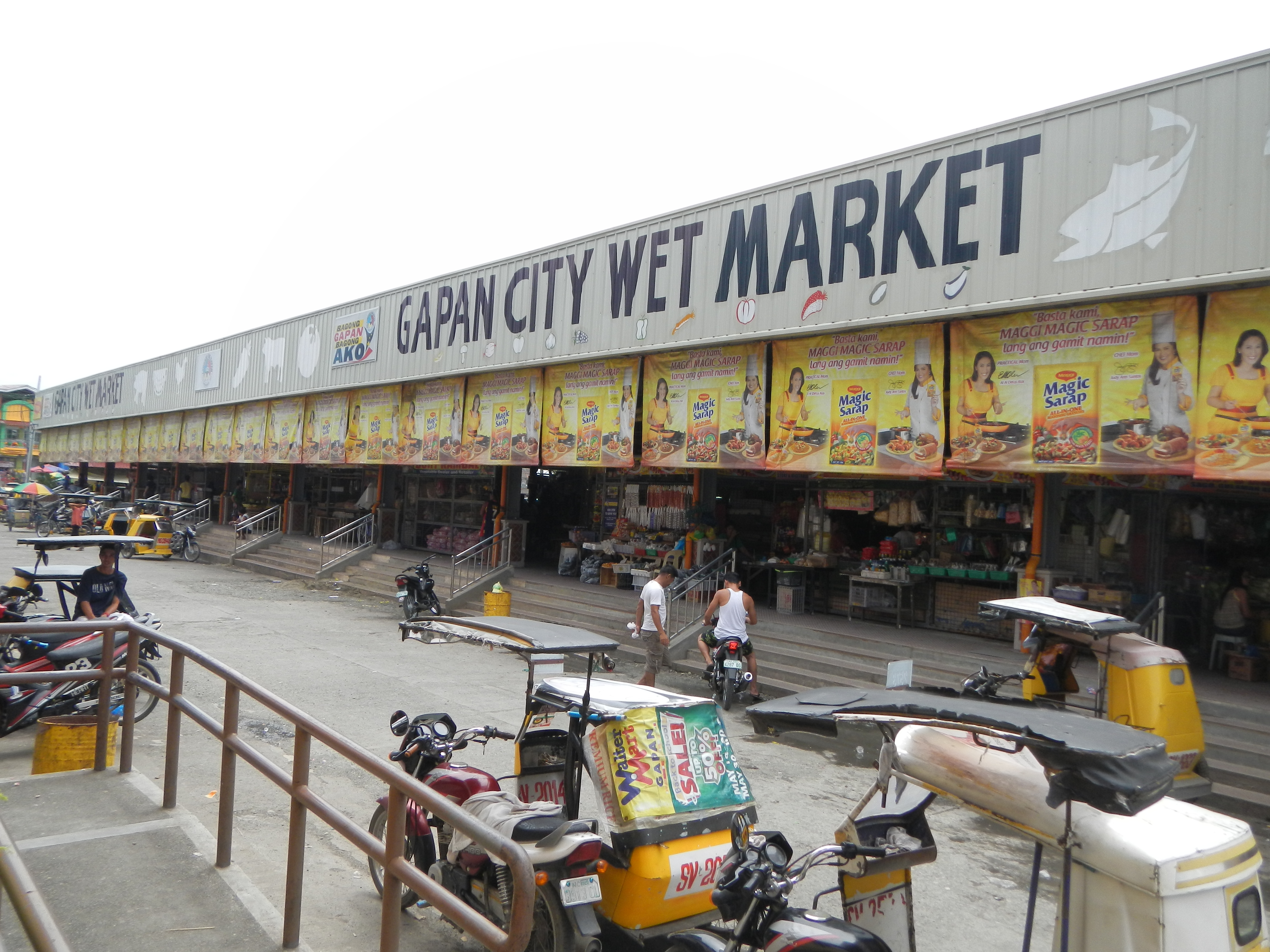
Wet market

The two major Philippine mall chains, Walter Mart and Robinsons Malls, have already established their presence in the city.

Currently, major shopping centers in the city include:

- Walter Mart Gapan
- Robinsons Gapan
- Primark Town Center Gapan

Gapan has also several local grocery, department, and hardware stores.

== Government ==
=== Local Government ===
Gapan's current seat of government, the city hall, is located at Maharlika Highway The local government structure is composed of one mayor, one vice mayor, and ten councilors. Each official is elected publicly to a 3-year term and can be re-elected up to 3 terms in succession. The day-to-day administration of the city is handled by the city administrator.

=== Elected Officials ===
Position	Name
District representative (4th Legislative District of the province of Nueva Ecija)	Emerson D. Pascual
Chief executive of the City of Gapan	Mayor Emary Joy D. Pascual
Presiding officer of the City Council of Gapan	Vice Mayor Max Pascual Howley
Members of the city council	Jeffrey D. Bautista
Members of the city council	Jay Mariano
Members of the city council	Gemma Pangilinan
Members of the city council	Nani Yu
Members of the city council	Idol Tecson
Members of the city council	Gerry Matias
Members of the city council	Amy Hernandez
Members of the city council	Tarat De Guzman
Members of the city council	Omeng Bautista
Members of the city council	Ser Padiernos

== Transportation ==
=== Public Transportation ===
Gapan serves many bus companies operating provincial and regional routes. Intercity and interprovincial buses from Manila serve the city, and are usually operated by Baliwag Transit, Inc., Five Star, Victory Liner, Genesis Transport Service Inc., and ES Transport Inc.

Jeepney operators serve routes within the province with some reaching as far to nearby towns in Nueva Ecija. Much of the city's population rely on public transportation such as tricycles and jeeps to get around the city.

=== Road Network ===
==== National Highway ====
Two main highways serve the city of Gapan: Maharlika Highway and Jose Abad Santos Avenue. Maharlika Highway (or Pan-Philippine Highway) is the main highway traversing the city where most vehicles going to Cagayan Valley pass through. It links Gapan to its nearby city of Cabanatuan and town of San Miguel in the province of Bulacan. It also allows travelers to reach towns of Sta. Rosa and San Leonardo. On the other hand, Jose Abad Santos Avenue is the highway that links Gapan to the towns of San Isidro and Cabiao, where the road continues straightforward, again turning westward then eastward, entering Pampanga, and passes through Pampanga River.

==== Expressway and Toll Roads ====
One proposed expressway will pass through Gapan if built: it would be the North Luzon East Expressway (Quezon City to Cabanatuan).

==== Penaranda-Gapan-San-Isidro-Cabiao Bypass Road ====
The city of Gapan can also be accessed through the 22-kilometer bypass road that also links other towns of Nueva Ecija, such as Peñaranda, San Isidro, and Cabiao. The entry and exit point is located in Brgy. Sto Cristo Norte.

== Tourism ==
Tourist sites in the city include:

- Lumang Gapan or Little Vigan - a recreation site of the Vigan heritage houses.
- Basilica Minor & National Shrine of Virgen La Divina Pastora - The center of Marian pilgrimages during the months of April and May and is declared by the Catholic Bishops Conference in 1986. Proclaimed as a "Minor Basilica" on April 26, 2024, by Pope Francis.
- Gapan City Plaza - the city's main plaza which includes various attractions such as a Ferris wheel, lights display, and food park.
- Casa Batik

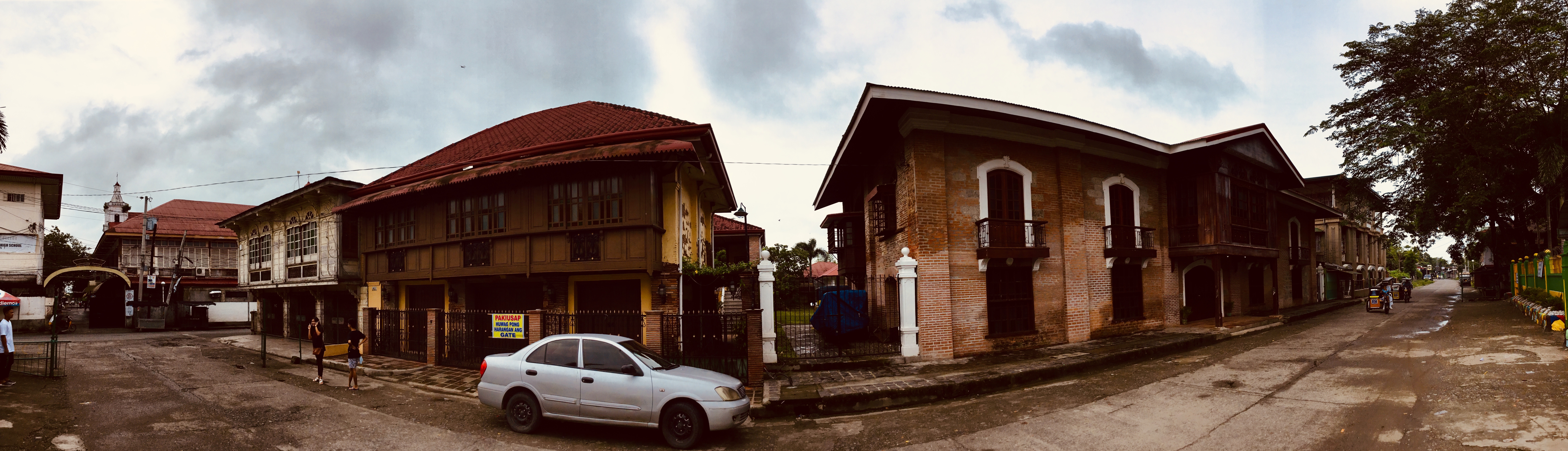
Historic center of Gapan

== Healthcare ==
- Good Samaritan General Hospital - a private hospital located at Don Simeon St, Gapan.
- Gapan District Hospital - a public hospital located at Divina Pastora Street, Divina Pastora Subdivision, Gapan.
- Batang Gapan Medical Center - an under-construction, four-storey, 132-bed capacity government hospital designed to primarily serve Nueva Ecija's fourth district including the towns of Peñaranda, General Tinio, San Leonardo, Jaen, San Antonio, Cabiao, and San Isidro.

== Education ==
Some prominent schools and colleges within the city include:

- The Great Shepherdess Montessori Center
- Divina Pastora College (DPC)
- College for Research and Technology (CRT)
- Gapan City College, formerly Nueva Ecija University of Science and Technology – Gapan Academic Extension Campus
- Gapan City College Annex - located on the old Gapan City Hall across the famous "Night Market" beside the Gapan City Plaza famous for its ferris wheel
- Gapan City Technical School
- Provincial Manpower Training Center (Technical School)
- Kinect Academy Inc.
- Glorious Hope Academy
- City College of Technology & Trade Inc.
- Microtech Institute of Trade Inc.

== Notable people ==
Some notable personalities who hail from Gapan include:

- Nida Blanca - actress
- Eula Valdez - actress
- Ryza Cenon - actress
- Rio Locsin - actress
- Emerson Pascual – representative, Nueva Ecija's 4th district
- Coleen Perez - actress
- Vic Silayan - actor
- Frankie Evangelista - former TV Patrol news anchor
- Joe Taruc - DZRH news anchor
- Juan Liwag - former senator of the Philippines
- Cielo Magno - economist, former Finance Undersecretary for Fiscal Policy and Monitoring.
- Mariano Llanera - revolutionary general of the battle cry of Nueva Ecija in Cabiao, Nueva Ecija
- General Pantaleon Valmonte - capitan municipal of Gapan who, together with General Mariano Llanera, capitan municipal of Cabiao, launched the "First Cry of Nueva Ecija" against the Spanish rule on September 2, 1896
- Josepina "Josie" Padiermos Fitial - former First Lady of the Northern Mariana Islands
- Juan Feleo - peasant leader and politician
- Rene Ramirez – auxiliary bishop of Melbourne.
- Mario Parial - multi-awarded painter, sculptor and photographer
- Sedfrey Ordoñez - lawyer; former Justice secretary
- Jayzam Manabat – famous vlogger, part of the YouTube duo JaMill with Camille Trinidad.

== Sister cities ==
- Cabanatuan, Nueva Ecija
- Cabiao, Nueva Ecija

== Gallery ==
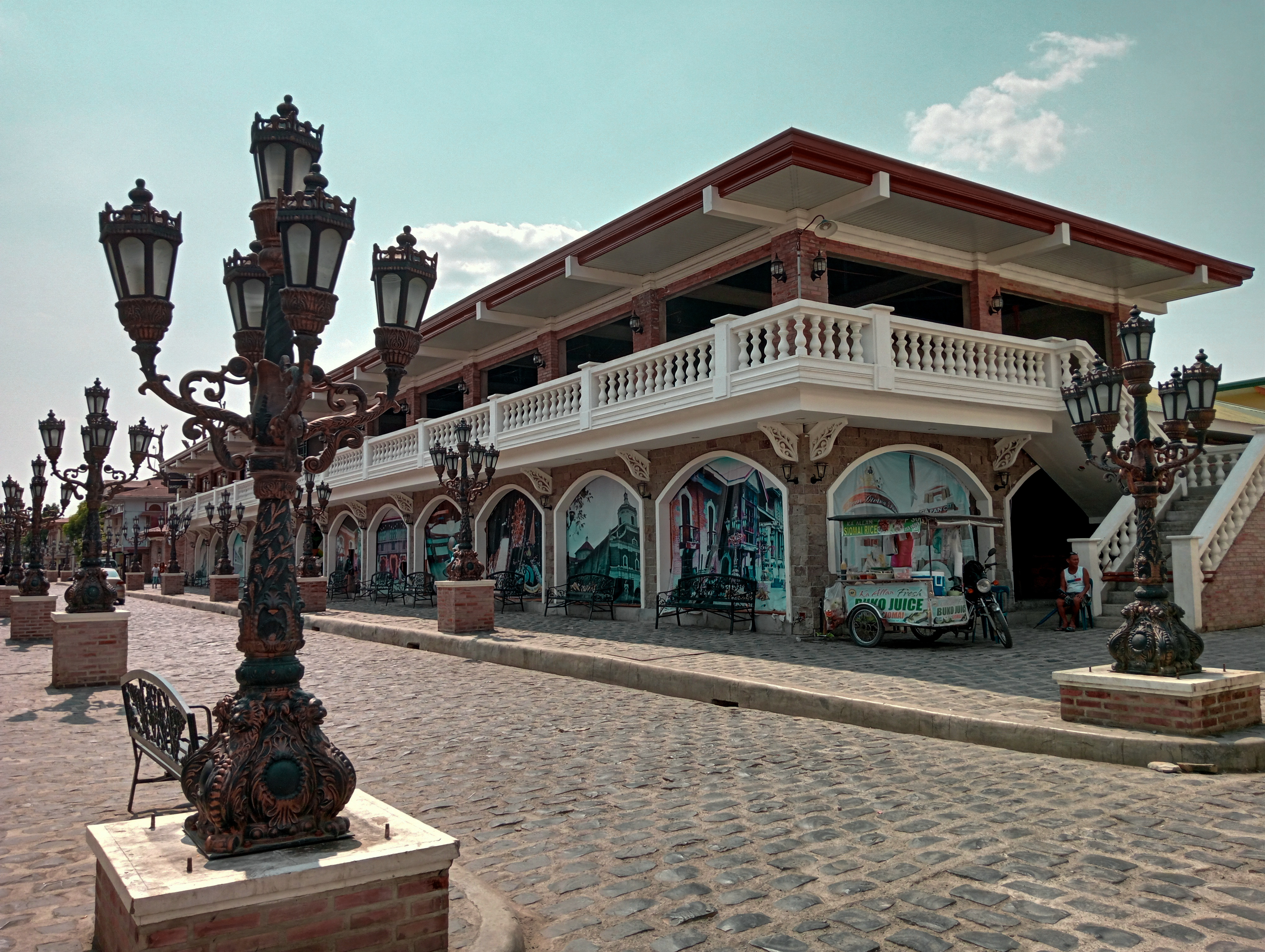
Lumang Gapan (Little Vigan)

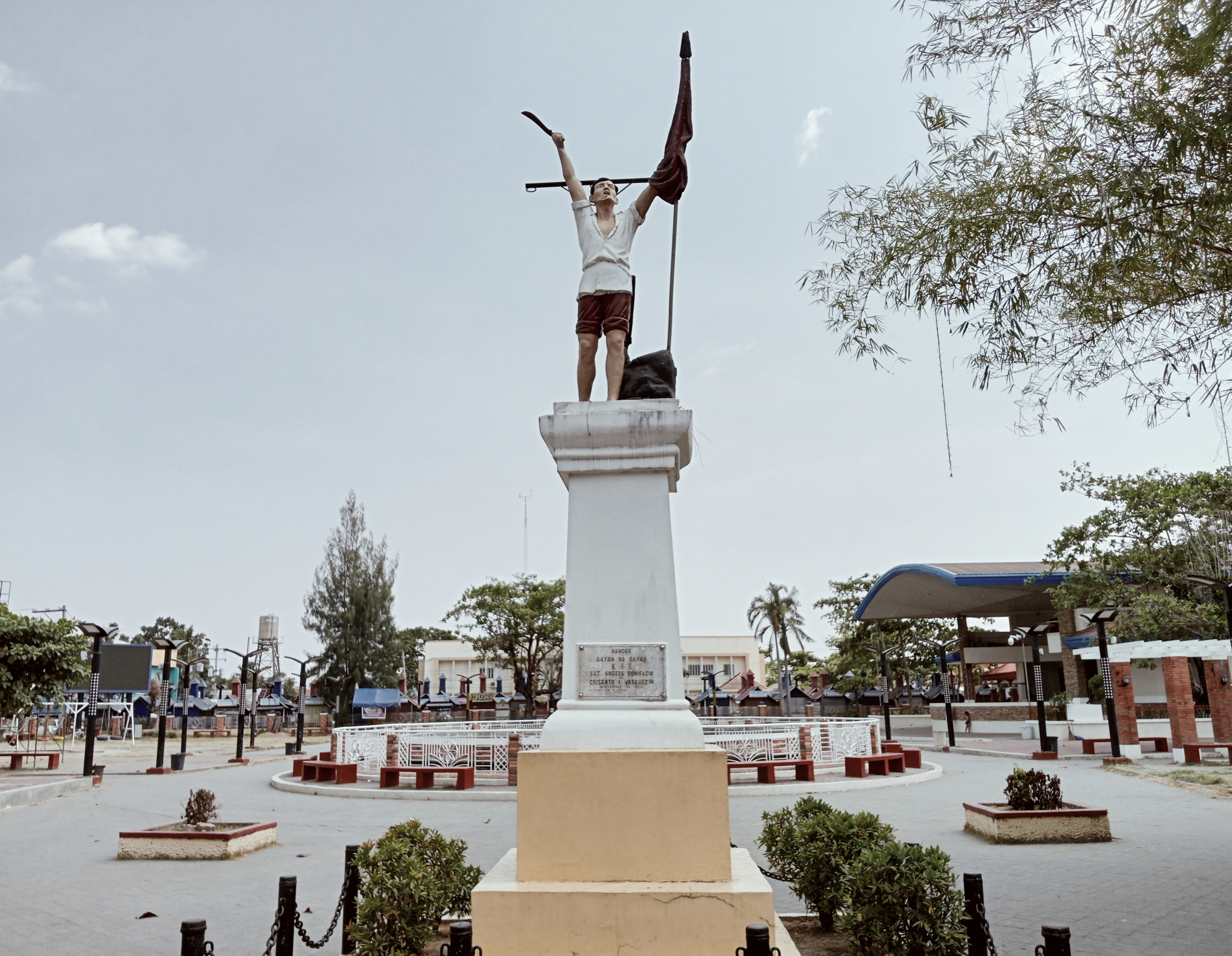
Gapan City Plaza

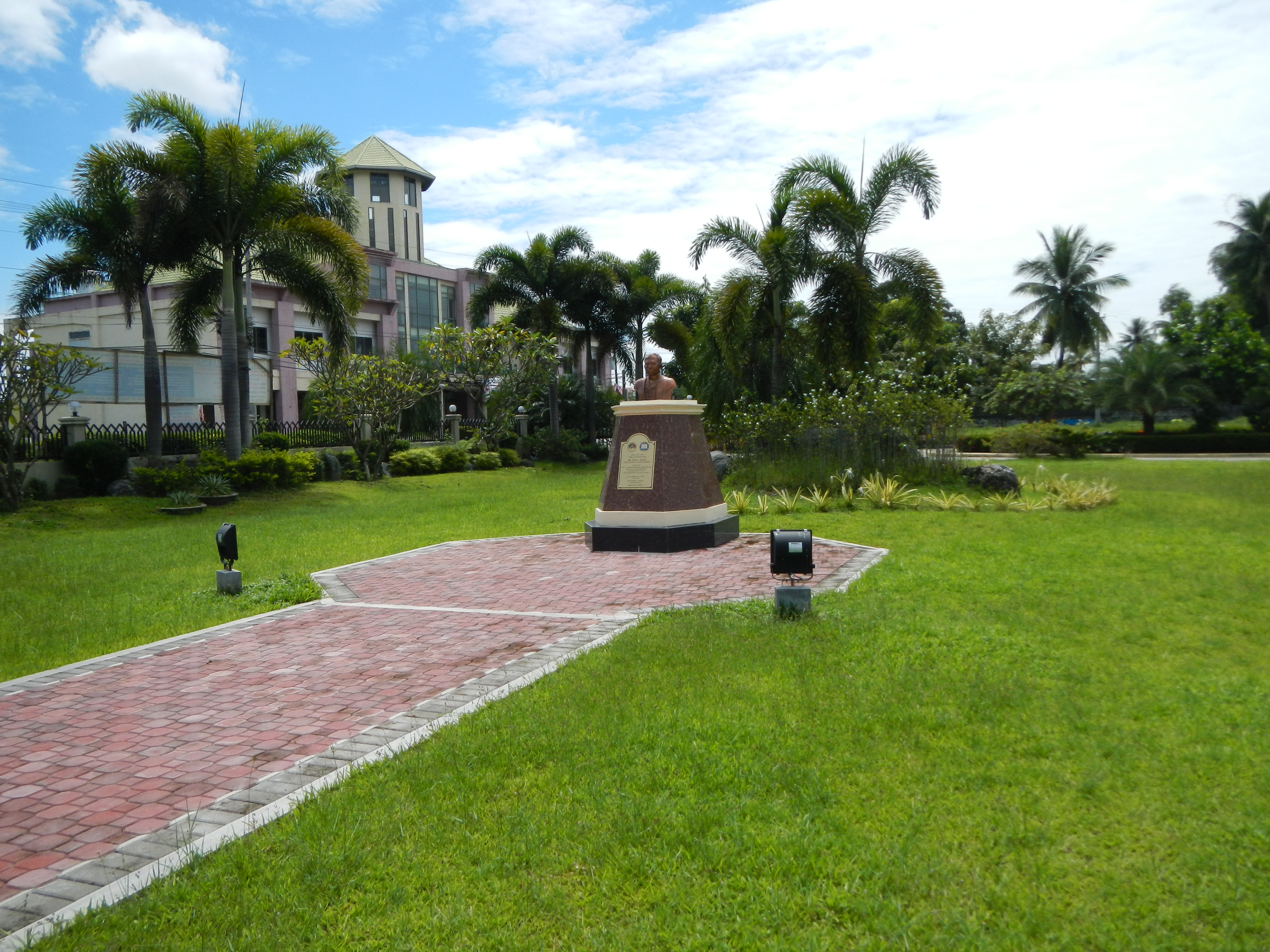
City park

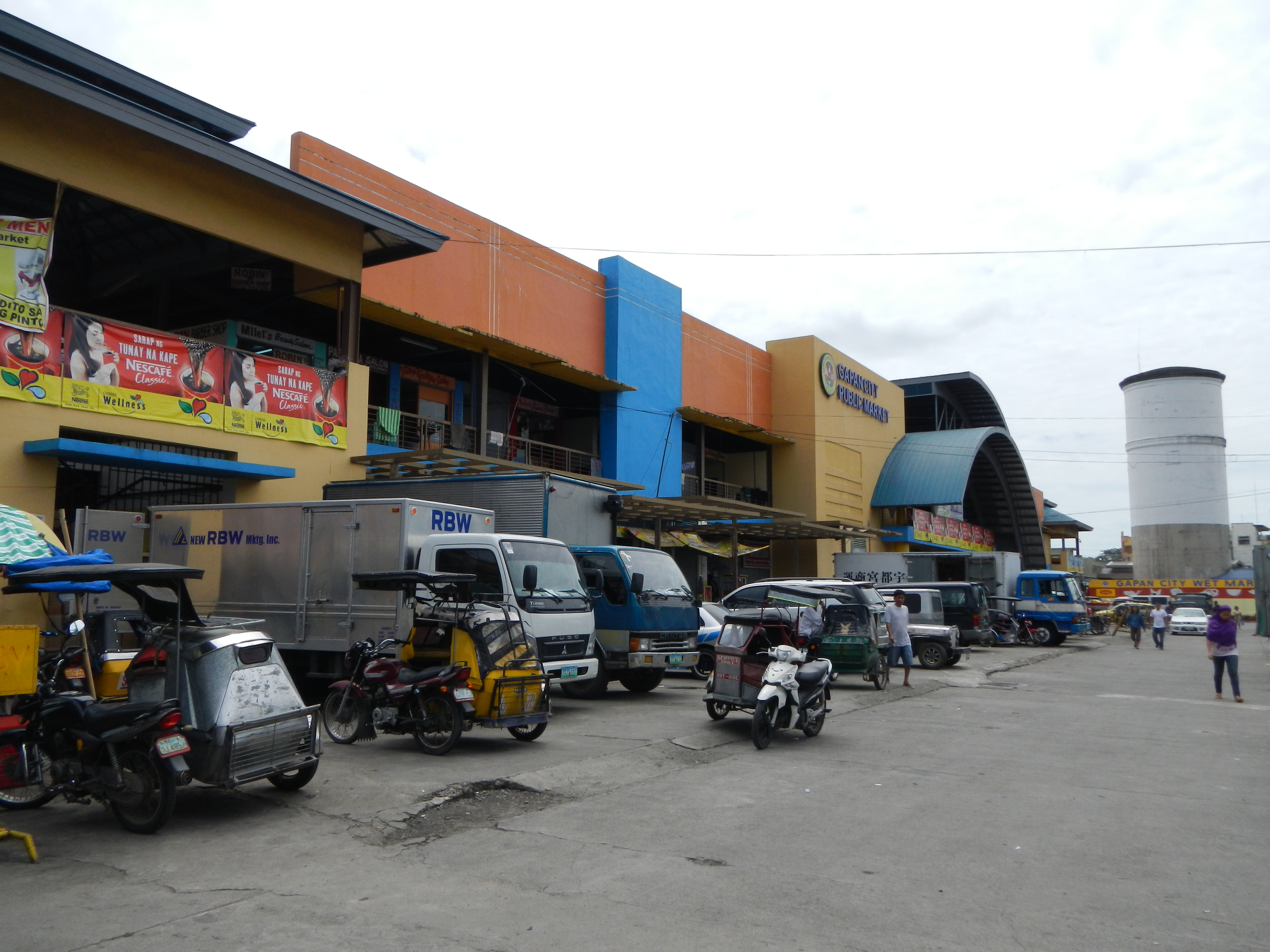
Dry market and the Water District
