= Emerson Pascual =

Filipino politician and businessman (born 1972)

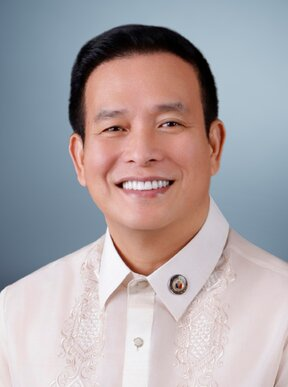
- Official portrait, 2025

Member of the House of Representatives from Nueva Ecija’s 4th district
- Incumbent
- Assumed office June 30, 2022
- Preceded by: Maricel Natividad Nagaño

Mayor of Gapan
- In office June 30, 2016 – June 30, 2022
- Vice Mayor: Inocencio Bautista Jr.
- Preceded by: Maricel Natividad Nagaño
- Succeeded by: Emary Joy Pascual

Personal details
- Born: Emerson David Pascual; October 19, 1972 (age 53) Gapan, Nueva Ecija, Philippines
- Party: NUP (2026–present)
- Other political affiliations: Lakas (2022–2026); Unang Sigaw (2018–2021); PDP–Laban (2016–2022)
- Occupation: Politician, businessman

Emerson "Emeng" David Pascual (born October 19, 1972) is a Filipino politician and businessman. He is currently serving as representative of the 4th District of Nueva Ecija in the House of Representatives of the Philippines since 2022. He previously served as Mayor of Gapan from 2016 to 2022.

== Political career ==
=== Barangay politics ===
Pascual entered politics when he was barangay captain on Pambuan in Gapan.

=== Mayor of Gapan (2016–2022) ===
In 2016 elections, Pascual was elected as mayor of Gapan for two consecutive terms.

=== House of Representatives (2022–present) ===
In 2022 elections, Pascual became a representative of the fourth district of Nueva Ecija.

== Personal life ==
Pascual is the son of Rodrigo "Boy" Pascual, a former barangay captain and Cristina "Bebe" David-Pascual. His sister, Emary Joy Pascual, is the current mayor of Gapan since 2022.

== Electoral history ==
Electoral history of Emerson Pascual
Year	Office	Party		Votes received				Result
Year	Office	Local	National	Total	%	P.	Swing	Result
2016	Mayor of Gapan	—N/a	PDP–Laban	28,961	—N/a	1st	—N/a	Won
2019	Mayor of Gapan	Unang Sigaw	PDP–Laban	43,056	—N/a	1st	—N/a	Unopposed
2022	Representative (Nueva Ecija–4th)	—N/a	PDP–Laban	177,046	53.55%	1st	—N/a	Won
2025	Representative (Nueva Ecija–4th)	—N/a	Lakas	197,350	57.32%	1st	—N/a	Won

House of Representatives of the Philippines
Preceded by Maricel Natividad Nagaño	Member of the House of Representatives from the 4th District of Nueva Ecija; 2022–present	Incumbent
Political offices
Preceded by Maricel Natividad Nagaño	Mayor of Gapan; 2016–2022	Succeeded by Emary Joy Pascual
