= Nueva Ecija's 4th congressional district =

Legislative district of the Philippines

- Constituency for the House of Representatives of the Philippines
- Boundary of the 4th congressional district in Nueva Ecija

- Location of Nueva Ecija within the Philippines
- Province: Nueva Ecija
- Region: Central Luzon
- Population: 582,181 (2020)
- Electorate: 403,655 (2022)
- Major settlements: 8 LGUs: Cities; Gapan; Municipalities; Cabiao; General Tinio; Jaen; Peñaranda; San Antonio; San Isidro; San Leonardo
- Area: 1,351.76 km^{2} (521.92 sq mi)

Current constituency
- Created: 1987
- Representative: Emerson D. Pascual
- Political party: NUP
- Congressional bloc: Majority

Nueva Ecija's 4th congressional district is one of the four congressional districts of the Philippines in the province of Nueva Ecija. It has been represented in the House of Representatives since 1987. The district consists of the city of Gapan and adjacent municipalities in southern Nueva Ecija, namely Cabiao, General Tinio, Jaen, Peñaranda, San Antonio, San Isidro and San Leonardo. It is currently represented in the 20th Congress by Emerson D. Pascual of the National Unity Party (NUP).

== Representation history ==
#	Image	Member	Term of office		Congress	Party	Electoral history	Constituent LGUs
#	Image	Member	Start	End	Congress	Party	Electoral history	Constituent LGUs
=== Nueva Ecija's 4th district for the House of Representatives of the Philippines ===
District created February 2, 1987.
1		Nicanor G. de Guzman Jr.	June 30, 1987	August 7, 1990	8th	LnB	Elected in 1987. Resigned following conviction for gun smuggling.	1987–present Cabiao, Gapan, General Tinio, Jaen, Peñaranda, San Antonio, San Isidro, San Leonardo
1		Nicanor G. de Guzman Jr.	June 30, 1987	August 7, 1990	8th	BALANE	Elected in 1987. Resigned following conviction for gun smuggling.	1987–present Cabiao, Gapan, General Tinio, Jaen, Peñaranda, San Antonio, San Isidro, San Leonardo
2		Victorio A. Lorenzo	June 30, 1992	June 30, 1995	9th	Lakas	Elected in 1992.	1987–present Cabiao, Gapan, General Tinio, Jaen, Peñaranda, San Antonio, San Isidro, San Leonardo
3		Julita Lorenzo Villareal	June 30, 1995	June 30, 2001	10th	LDP	Elected in 1995.	1987–present Cabiao, Gapan, General Tinio, Jaen, Peñaranda, San Antonio, San Isidro, San Leonardo
3		Julita Lorenzo Villareal	June 30, 1995	June 30, 2001	11th	Lakas	Re-elected in 1998.	1987–present Cabiao, Gapan, General Tinio, Jaen, Peñaranda, San Antonio, San Isidro, San Leonardo
4		Raul L. Villareal	June 30, 2001	June 30, 2004	12th	NPC	Elected in 2001.	1987–present Cabiao, Gapan, General Tinio, Jaen, Peñaranda, San Antonio, San Isidro, San Leonardo
5		Rodolfo W. Antonino	June 30, 2004	June 30, 2013	13th	KAMPI	Elected in 2004.	1987–present Cabiao, Gapan, General Tinio, Jaen, Peñaranda, San Antonio, San Isidro, San Leonardo
5		Rodolfo W. Antonino	June 30, 2004	June 30, 2013	14th	Lakas	Re-elected in 2007.	1987–present Cabiao, Gapan, General Tinio, Jaen, Peñaranda, San Antonio, San Isidro, San Leonardo
5		Rodolfo W. Antonino	June 30, 2004	June 30, 2013	15th	NUP	Re-elected in 2010.	1987–present Cabiao, Gapan, General Tinio, Jaen, Peñaranda, San Antonio, San Isidro, San Leonardo
6		Magnolia Antonino Nadres	June 30, 2013	June 30, 2019	16th	NUP	Elected in 2013.	1987–present Cabiao, Gapan, General Tinio, Jaen, Peñaranda, San Antonio, San Isidro, San Leonardo
6		Magnolia Antonino Nadres	June 30, 2013	June 30, 2019	16th	UNA	Elected in 2013.	1987–present Cabiao, Gapan, General Tinio, Jaen, Peñaranda, San Antonio, San Isidro, San Leonardo
6		Magnolia Antonino Nadres	June 30, 2013	June 30, 2019	17th	NUP	Re-elected in 2016.	1987–present Cabiao, Gapan, General Tinio, Jaen, Peñaranda, San Antonio, San Isidro, San Leonardo
7		Maricel Natividad Nagaño	June 30, 2019	June 30, 2022	18th	PRP	Elected in 2019.	1987–present Cabiao, Gapan, General Tinio, Jaen, Peñaranda, San Antonio, San Isidro, San Leonardo
7		Maricel Natividad Nagaño	June 30, 2019	June 30, 2022	18th	Unang Sigaw	Elected in 2019.	1987–present Cabiao, Gapan, General Tinio, Jaen, Peñaranda, San Antonio, San Isidro, San Leonardo
8		Emerson D. Pascual	June 30, 2022	Incumbent	19th	Lakas	Elected in 2022.	1987–present Cabiao, Gapan, General Tinio, Jaen, Peñaranda, San Antonio, San Isidro, San Leonardo
8		Emerson D. Pascual	June 30, 2022	Incumbent	20th	NUP	Re-elected in 2025.	1987–present Cabiao, Gapan, General Tinio, Jaen, Peñaranda, San Antonio, San Isidro, San Leonardo

== Election results ==
=== 2025 ===
2025 Philippine House of Representatives elections
Party	Candidate	Votes	%
Lakas	Emerson "Emeng" Pascual	197,350	58.27
Sigaw	Maricel Natividad Nagaño	146,964	43.39
Total votes		338,094	100
Lakas gain from PRP			

=== 2022 ===
2022 Philippine House of Representatives elections
Party	Candidate	Votes	%
PDP–Laban	Emerson "Emeng" Pascual	177,046	53.54
Sigaw	Maricel Natividad Nagaño	153,599	46.45
Total votes		330,645	100
PDP–Laban gain from PRP			

=== 2019 ===
2019 Philippine House of Representatives elections
Party	Candidate	Votes	%
PRP	Maricel Natividad Nagaño	137,829	
NUP	Magnolia Rosa Antonino	125,666	
Independent	Bongtong Punongbayan	1,769	
Total votes			100
PRP gain from NUP			

=== 2016 ===
2016 Philippine House of Representatives elections
Party	Candidate	Votes	%
UNA	Magnolia Rosa Antonino	159,299	
Liberal	Pol Interior	69,916	
Independent	Virgilio Bote	6,874	
Independent	Montano Cayanan	2,262	
Total votes		238,351	100
UNA gain from Liberal			

=== 2013 ===
2013 Philippine House of Representatives elections
Party	Candidate	Votes	%
NUP	Magnolia Antonino-Nadres	121,494	53.42
BALANE	Orlando Nagaño	39,372	17.31
NPC	Julita Villareal	29,118	12.80
Liberal	Aurora Sonia Lorenzo	19,067	8.38
Margin of victory		82,122	36.11%
Invalid or blank votes		18,384	8.08
Total votes		227,435	100.00
NUP hold			

== See also ==
- Legislative districts of Nueva Ecija
