= Bataan's 3rd congressional district =

House of Representatives of the Philippines legislative district

- Constituency for the House of Representatives of the Philippines
- Map Location of Bataan within the Philippines
- Province: Bataan
- Region: Central Luzon
- Population: 334,847 (2020)
- Electorate: 223,643 (2025)
- Major settlements: 4 LGUs: Municipalities; Bagac; Dinalupihan; Mariveles; Morong
- Area: 696.82 km^{2} (269.04 sq mi)

Current constituency
- Created: 2021
- Representative: Maria Angela Garcia
- Political party: NUP
- Congressional bloc: Majority

Bataan's 3rd congressional district is one of the three congressional districts of the Philippines in the province of Bataan. It has been represented in the House of Representatives since 2022. The district consists of western Bataan municipalities of Bagac, Dinalupihan, Mariveles and Morong. It is currently represented in the 20th Congress by Maria Angela Garcia of the National Unity Party (NUP), who is the district's first representative since its creation.

== Representation history ==
#	Image	Member	Term of office		Congress	Party	Electoral history	Constituent LGUs
#	Image	Member	Start	End	Congress	Party	Electoral history	Constituent LGUs
=== Bataan's 3rd district for the House of Representatives of the Philippines ===
District created June 24, 2021.
1		Maria Angela Garcia	June 30, 2022	Incumbent	19th	NUP	Elected in 2022.	2022–present Bagac, Dinalupihan, Mariveles, Morong
1		Maria Angela Garcia	June 30, 2022	Incumbent	20th	NUP	Re-elected in 2025.	2022–present Bagac, Dinalupihan, Mariveles, Morong

== Election results ==
=== 2025 ===
Candidate	Party	Votes	%
Maria Angela Garcia (incumbent)	National Unity Party	144,517	87.51
Ernesto Manalo	Independent	20,627	12.49
Total		165,144	100.00
Valid votes		165,144	88.87
Invalid/blank votes		20,683	11.13
Total votes		185,827	100.00
Registered voters/turnout		223,643	83.09
National Unity Party hold			
Source: Commission on Elections

=== 2022 ===
2022 Philippine House of Representatives election in the Bataan's 3rd district
Party	Candidate	Votes	%
NUP	Maria Angela Garcia	102,488	58.25
PDSP	Angel Peliglorio Jr.	73,465	41.75
Total votes		175,953	100.00
NUP win (new seat)			

== See also ==
- Legislative districts of Bataan
