= Immaculate Heart of Mary School, Bulacan =

Roman Catholic school in Bulacan, Philippines

Location
- Lourdes Grotto Compound, San Jose del Monte, Bulacan, Philippines
- Coordinates: 14°47′38″N 121°03′57″E

Information
- Type: Catholic High School
- Motto: "My God and My All"
- Established: 1992
- School district: Diocese of Malolos
- Principal: Sr. Lydia O. Cañon, SFSC (as of 2021-Present)
- Faculty: <20
- Enrollment: <200 (as of 2016-17)
- Student to teacher ratio: max. 1:30
- Colors: White, Blue, Red
- Athletics conference: MADICSA, BULPRISA, PRISCA, CSJODEMPRISA

Immaculate Heart of Mary School, Bulacan (IHMS, Bulacan) is a Catholic school owned and managed by the Franciscan Sisters of the Sacred Heart whose apostolate is the sanctification and formation of children and young people through educational apostolate. It is located inside the Basilica of Lourdes Grotto Compound at the City of San Jose del Monte, Bulacan. The land for the school site was a donation from the Guanzon Family.

The community of sisters and 30 lay members of the Immaculatinian Learning Community is taking care of the nearly 200 students from Kinder to High School including the Orphanage (Father Simpliciano of the Nativity).

== History ==
- 1977 - The arrival of the first five (5) Franciscan Sisters of the Sacred Hearts from Italy headed by Mother Flora Zippo, who at present is the Provincial Delegate to the Philippines.
- 1979 - The first Immaculate Heart of Mary School was established in Parañaque. This became the Main when it has its first branch in Bulacan.
- 1989 - The arrival of the first group of Sisters in Grotto to manage an orphanage headed by Sr. Estrella Villaran.
- 1992 - Mary Immaculate Learning Center opened with its Nursery, Kinder, Prep and Grade One with Sr. Lydia Cañon as its Educational Consultant. The DepEd permit was granted to the Elementary Department.
- 1993 - The opening of Grade Two with Sr. Alma Mangahas as its First Principal.
- 1994 - The opening of the Grade Three with Sr. Francesca Bailosis as its Second Principal.
- 1996 - The school obtained Government Recognition and Permit.
- 1998 - The first Commencement Exercises in the Grade School Department with 20 graduates.
- The completion of the school's main building with its canteen, library, science laboratory, computer center, eleven spacious classrooms and administrative offices.
- The Immaculate Heart of Mary Park was put up by the PTA Ex-Board S.Y. 1996-1998.
- The High School Department opened with 26 first year students and with the implementation of the New Secondary Education Curriculum intended to provide general education.
- The name of the school was changed to Immaculate Heart of Mary School, Bulacan with Sr. Mary Edna G. Liamzon as its Third Principal.
- 1999 - The opening of the Second Year class.
- The four-year computer program of the Fourth-R was introduced from Grade III to High School for the improvement and upgrading of Computer Education.
- 2000 - On the Occasion of the Great Jubilee of the Lord, the Third Year class was opened with Sr. Arminda D. Hobrero as its Fourth Principal.
- 2001 - The opening of the Fourth Year class.
- The graduation of the First batch of High School.
- 2002 - The start of the construction of the school stage.
- The renovation of the basketball court was started by the PTA board S.Y. 2002-2003.
- 2003 - The putting up of the Speech and Language laboratory.
- 2004 - Speech classes in the Elementary and High School department.
- Upgrading of all computer units and adding 10 units of computers.
- 2006 - The opening of the S.Y. 2006-2007 with Sr. Monica U. Navarro, former Principal of IHMS in Bacon, Sorsogon, as its Fifth Principal.
- The school obtained two (2) dozen of brand new computers and replaced the old ones used in the computer center and administrative offices.
- 2007 - The school celebrated its Crystal 15th Foundation Anniversary with a week-long celebration.
- The first set of ImmAlumni officers were elected, coming from the high school graduates of S.Y. 2006-2007.
- The school published its first and own school paper: Immazette .
