= Akta Lakota Museum and Cultural Center =

Lakota culture museum in Chamberlain, South Dakota

Aktá Lakota Museum and Cultural Center
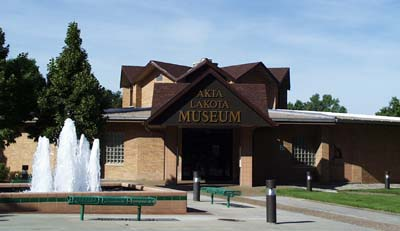

- Location within South Dakota Location within the United States
- Established: 1991
- Location: 1301 N Main St, Chamberlain, South Dakota
- Coordinates: 43°49′32″N 99°19′28″W
- Director: Dixie Thompson
- Website: aktalakota.org

The Aktá Lakota Museum & Cultural Center is a private, non-profit educational and cultural outreach program of St. Joseph's Indian School, Chamberlain, South Dakota, United States. The museum was established in May 1991 to honor and preserve the Lakota culture for the students at St. Joseph’s Indian School and to foster among people who visit an appreciation of the culture.

The mission of the Aktá Lakota Museum is to promote the knowledge and understanding of the cultures of Northern Plains Native Americans through the preservation of historical and contemporary works of art. The Aktá Lakota Museum has one of South Dakota’s most comprehensive collections of Northern Plains Native American artwork and historical artifacts.

== History ==
In May 1991, the museum opened its doors, housed in an octagon-shaped building featuring 14,000 square feet (1,300 m^{2}) of exhibition space, which was originally constructed in 1968 as classroom space for St. Joseph's Indian School. The museum is influenced by Lakota philosophy including using the four cardinal directions of the medicine wheel: East ("Camp Circle") represents Lakota culture prior to Euro-American contact and exhibits explain historical relationships between tribes and bands; South ("Two Worlds Meet") details the arrival of Euro-American explorers, missionaries, traders and settlers in the early 1800s; West ("Broken Promises") represents interactions with the US Government and the formation of reservations; and North ("Continuity and Change") showcases the adaptation of the Lakota as their culture continues on.

In 2013, a section was added to document the history and accomplishments of staff and students in the Tokéya Uŋkí Nájiŋpi lit. 'We Stood Here in the Beginning' Historical & Alumni Center. In 2014, the museum added the Medicine Wheel Garden exhibit to their west side. There is no admission fee to enter the museum.

== Collection ==
The museum has around 2,500 objects in their collection. They have a number of Lakota artifacts dating back to the 1800s from the surrounding area as well as contemporary works by Native artists. They own six works by Dakota artist Oscar Howe with their most prominent of his work being the Indian Christ woven in tapestry by Grete Bodegaard Heikes which is located in the Our Lady of the Sioux Chapel. Also in their collection are the works of Dyani White Hawk, Arthur Amiotte, Keith BraveHeart, and Robert Penn, a protégé of the late Oscar Howe.
