= Chamberlain Indian School =

Chamberlain Indian School was an American Indian boarding school in Chamberlain, South Dakota, located on the east bank of the Missouri River. It was among 25 off-reservation boarding schools opened by the federal government by 1898 in the plains region. It was administered by the Bureau of Indian Affairs and operated until 1908

After the school closed, the federal government transferred it to the Catholic Church for use as a college. The Diocese of Sioux Falls used the former boarding school as Columbus College. A new facility was established in Sioux Falls, and the college was closed here in 1923. Given economic strains, Columbus College closed in Sioux Falls in 1929.

In 1927, the Catholic Priests of the Sacred Heart, an order based in Wisconsin, bought the buildings and property of the former Chamberlain School to establish the private St. Joseph's Indian School at the site. It is still in operation and serves primarily Lakota students.

== History ==
Chamberlain Indian School was opened in 1898, one of 25 off-reservation schools established by the federal government in the plains region. Its goal was to assimilate Native American children into mainstream white American culture. At this time, the children were not permitted to speak native languages or practice their religion. They were given Christian names, had their hair cut, and were forced to wear European-style clothing.

Because of the isolated location, the school was planned to encompass a farm, so that food and livestock could be raised there for school purposes. But the farmland associated with the school was poor and could not provide enough produce. In addition, students suffered from a high rate of communicable diseases. The annual report for 1908 listed 20 instructors for 185 pupils.

In 1909 the school closed. Students who had come here from Crow Creek Indian Reservation and Lower Brule Indian Reservation were transferred to the Rapid City Indian School, another off-reservation boarding school.

Congress authorized granting the Chamberlain School facilities to the Catholic Church for "college purposes". Thomas O'Gorman, Bishop of Sioux Falls, South Dakota, had requested transfer of the school in order to establish a prep school, high school and college here for Catholic males. It was the only Catholic college in the state for males. Columbus College was operated here by the Clerics of St. Viator until 1921. The college was moved to another facility at Sioux Falls, and this facility was closed again.

In 1927, the government sold the former Chamberlain buildings and land to the Priests of the Sacred Heart, a Catholic institute who established St. Joseph's Indian School here. This order is based in Wisconsin. They still operate the school, which serves boarding students.

== Chamberlain Superintendents/directors ==
- John Flinn (1901)
- S. A. M. Young (1908)

== Enrollment ==
- 1905: 173
- 1908: 185
- 1909: 190

== Notable students ==
- Zintkala Nuni
