= Sioux San Hospital =

- Indian Health Service

Geography
- Location: Rapid City, South Dakota, United States
- Coordinates: 44.074350°N 103.271669°W

History
- Constructed: 1898
- Opened: 1933
- Closed: 1960s

Links
- Lists: Hospitals in South Dakota

The Rapid City Indian Health Service Hospital formerly known as The Sioux San Hospital is an Indian Health Service hospital located in Rapid City, South Dakota. It was built in 1898 as a boarding school for Native Americans and turned into a sanitarium in 1933.

== History ==
=== Boarding school ===
Located in the west side of Rapid City, South Dakota, it started out as a boarding school known as the Rapid City Indian School in 1898. Members of the Sioux, Cheyenne, Shoshone, Arapaho, Crow, and Flathead tribes were forced into the government institution to be taught how to assimilate into European American culture and language. Abuse, neglect, and death were prominent. Runaways were caught and dragged back to the school. It was closed in 1933.

=== Sanitarium ===
The building remained empty for many years until the outbreak of tuberculosis in the early 1900s. The building was then converted into a massive hospital called the Sioux Sanitarium for Native American TB patients in 1939. These years were the worst in its history, as documented by Madonna Swan, a Lakota woman who was held at the sanitarium between 1944 and 1950. Unlike sanitaria for white people, which offered restorative environments and experimental treatments, Sioux San was a place where Native Americans went to die. The patients were rarely allowed outdoors, and were often served contaminated food. After the patenting of streptomycin, the hospital closed in the 1960s.

=== Present state ===
The building remained empty for several years. The hospital still has numerous unmarked graves around the campus, not only of the TB patients, but also of Native American children. In 1966, after Native elders and community members agitated for better treaty-guaranteed health services, the building was reopened as an Indian Health Service clinic.

In 2009, for the first time, the hospital temporarily cancelled all regular appointments due to an overload of H1N1 patients. In 2016, Congress appropriated $117 million to renovate the hospital, and plans were proceeding to demolish some of the historic buildings.
