= Franciscan Sisters of the Sacred Heart =

Roman Catholic religious congregation for women

Coordinates: 41°31′11.65″N 87°50′25.37″W

The Franciscan Sisters of the Sacred Heart is a Roman Catholic religious congregation of women based in Frankfort, Illinois, and located in the Catholic Diocese of Joliet, Illinois. The Sisters serve in healthcare, education, religious education, parish and diocesan ministries and ministry to the poor.

Following the Rule of Saint Francis of Assisi and as members of the Third Order Regular, they are women dedicated to sharing their lives in prayer, community and ministry. Their founder, Father Wilhelm Berger, defined their ministries as works of neighborly love.

== History ==
=== Founding ===
In 1866, Sister Coletta Himmelsbach and three other women in Seelbach, which was then part of the Grand Duchy of Baden, (now part of Germany), accepted the challenge to serve the poor, the sick, and the aging of their village. From this small group, the Congregation now known as the Franciscan Sisters of the Sacred Heart emerged. In 1868 they opened a chapel at their first Motherhouse at Trettenhoff, near Seelbach, which they had purchased to accommodate their growing program and number of members. The Sisters cared for the sick in their homes and nursed victims of smallpox and typhoid fever, which increased in the social disruption during and after the Franco-Prussian War. They also provided education to the young and opened their convent doors to care for orphans and the elderly. Additionally, they worked on the battlefield during the war to nurse and treat the wounded.

During the period of the Kulturkampf in the 1870s, anti-Catholic feeling rose in Germany as Bismarck worked to establish a more secular government. The Sisters faced pressure to disband or migrate. While they were discerning their course of action, Rev. Dominic Duehmig, who had established himself in the United States, invited the Sisters to that country. Consequently, they began to migrate in 1876.

=== United States of America ===
On May 17, 1876, four Sisters set sail for the United States, settling in Avilla, Indiana, within the Diocese of Fort Wayne. Shortly thereafter, 23 other Sisters from Baden joined them. Mother Anastasia Bischler was elected as their first General Superior. Archbishop Patrick Feehan of Chicago approved their Constitutions on March 10, 1888. The Religious Institute was granted Pontifical status on July 16, 1898.

Because of expanding ministries, the Motherhouse was transferred to Joliet, Illinois, in 1883. In 1893, they established Mercy Hospital in Burlington, Iowa.

They worked in education, ministries to the poor, and in healthcare. In the late 1920s, for instance, some Franciscan Sisters moved to Chamberlain, South Dakota, where they assisted Priests of the Sacred Heart in running St. Joseph's Indian School, founded in 1927 primarily to serve Lakota students and families from nearby reservations. As of 2021, the school continues to serve Native Americans in the region, with about 220 students annually in grades K–8. The Sisters also established missions in South America.

In 1964 the Motherhouse moved to Frankfort, Illinois, where it is still located. The sisters have run many healthcare facilities, such as the Queen of Angels Hospital (1926–1989) in Los Angeles, California, which partnered with another institution in a new facility.

=== Today ===
The group is founded on Franciscan values of poverty, humility, contemplation, and continual conversion. Their varied ministries include education, healing and service. They live communally in convents located in Illinois, Indiana, Kentucky, and California, as well as in the Amazon basin area of Brazil, South America.
