= Rapid City Indian School =

Native American school in South Dakota, United States

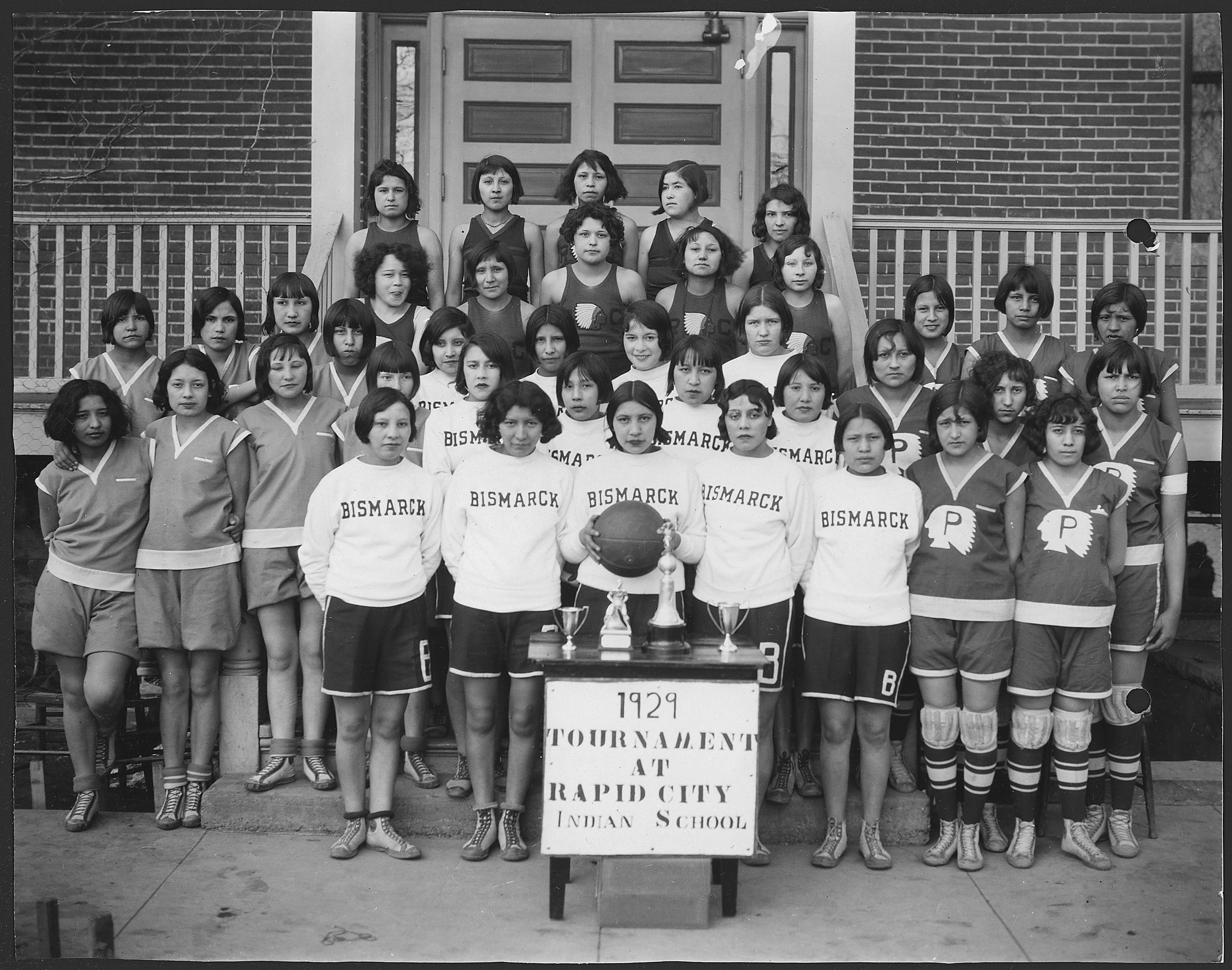
- From 1929, the girls' Rapid City basketball team are in the top two rows.

Location
- Rapid City, South Dakota; United States; 44.077964°N 103.272049°W

Information
- Type: Boarding school
- Established: 1898
- Closed: 1933
- Enrollment: 650

The Rapid City Indian School was located in Rapid City, South Dakota, and has since been converted into both an asylum and a hospital known as the Sioux San Hospital. The school opened 1898 as part of the federal government's off-reservation boarding school movement for Native Americans and was shut down in 1933 to become a tuberculosis center. The hospital in the past few years has been listed on the market and is currently being considered for demolition, even though local tribes had tried to claim back the land in the past.

== Indian boarding schools ==
These schools were put in place by the government for two main reasons: to require the mastery of English and to "civilize" the Indians. There were roughly 100 Indian boarding schools that the US government operated, often forcing children away from their families for schooling. Twenty-five of these schools were off-reservation boarding schools in 1900, holding 7,430 students. Every day was filled with strict schedules and specific activities for girls and boys, home-making skills for the former and carpentry for the latter. Some students were forced against their will to go, others were in poverty and the boarding schools were a way out, and others wanted education and to meet other people from different tribes. Reports on these Indian boarding schools are largely negative, with most students found to be "malnourished, overworked, harshly punished and poorly educated." While the conditions at the schools were often terrible, they were often regarded as better than the certain poverty that most children faced at home in their reservations.

== Rapid City school years ==
Three reservations were close enough to the school to enroll students: the Pine Ridge, Rosebud, and Cheyenne River reservations. Towards the 1900s, approximately 650 children went to Rapid City Indian School from Wyoming, Montana, and western South Dakota. Indian police around the different reservations would make sure that students came to school each day, including an escort for a child if they had missed school the day before. The first superintendent, Ralph P. Collins, made controversy with reservation officials by travelling around to different reservations to recruit children to the school then forcing them all to travel by wagon to Rapid City, taking away students from the on-reservation schools. His tactics were criticized as many opponents viewed this as similar to the slave trade, causing the commissioner of Indian Affairs, Francis E. Leupp, to ban recruiters going to reservations in 1908. In 1909, students enrolled at the Chamberlain Indian School in South Dakota who had come from the Crow Creek and Lower Brule Indian Reservation were transferred to Rapid City. The early 1900s to 1930s showed many families wanting to keep their families together, prompting the school to keep their lower grades available to keep up enrollment, as many boarding schools split up the younger elementary grades from the older grades. Some students and families who decided to have their children attend Rapid City decided so based on the extensiveness of the course catalog and due to the fact that the parents or relatives of these students gained jobs at the school.

Rapid City ran a very strict program. Their techniques stemmed from military drills and discipline, requiring students to walk in straight lines, walk in an orderly fashion, be at their dormitories during certain times of the day, and only allowing rowdiness during recess. The teacher-student ratio was extremely low, resulting in a lax of discipline with teachers stretched so thin during the day. However, teachers were able to enforce their power over the students through verbal abuse and humiliation, fueling students to run away as a way to enforce their own power over the administration.

Regarding student health, nutrition at the school increased after World War I, while health care was never adequate in checking for or in preventing diseases and illnesses. Many families were wary of sending their children to the school for health reasons, for example some parents refused to send back their children in 1911 after two children died the previous school year. The school didn't offer very much nutrition or variety in meals, and hunger from measly meals resulted in some students trying to run away. As for disease, boarding schools became a main source of infection and transmission. Some believed the children learning more hygienic habits would result in a decline of sickness, yet many children passed different forms of the flu and colds between each and brought them home to the reservations.

The Rapid City school required uniforms like other federal off-reservation schools. Students received dress clothes, school clothes, and working clothes, and, with money the students earned and under strict regulation, could occasionally purchase their own clothes. Female students had a hard time affording to dress with the times and to have acceptable clothing, as for many families paying for these clothes was enough to pay for a full set of home furniture.

The curriculum at the school focused on English, as all Indian boarding schools did. Other focuses in the curriculum included vocational jobs, such as blacksmiths and the dairy industry for boys, and classroom work. Girls education focused on clothes' making and household chores, mainly focusing on learning to clean different objects and areas. Rapid City followed the model of other urban schools at the time by having two teachers to teach 80 students in 1898 and by 1916, only employing four teachers for the whole school.

== Closure and aftermath ==
The school was closed in 1933 to become a tuberculosis sanatorium, named Sioux Sanatorium or "Sioux San," splitting up the families within the school by taking younger students to a different boarding school and the older students to another. The land was split into three lots owned by the federal government, with the Sioux San Hospital being the last remaining structure of the school. In 2014, sixteen tribes from South Dakota, North Dakota, and Nebraska requested that the land be turned back over to tribal care because the land is listed as a plot of spiritual land guaranteed to the Sioux Nation under the 1868 Treaty of Fort Laramie.

== See also ==
- American Indian boarding schools
- Cheyenne River Reservation
- Pine Ridge Reservation
- Rosebud Reservation
- Treaty of Fort Laramie (1868)
- United States Indian Police
- Sioux San Hospital
