= Madonna Swan =

- Born: September 12, 1928; Cheyenne River Sioux Reservation, South Dakota, U.S.
- Died: 1993 (aged 64–65)

Madonna Mary Swan-Abdalla (September 12, 1928 – 1993) was a Lakota woman best known for her autobiographical narrative, Madonna Swan: A Lakota Woman's Story, as told through the author Mark St. Pierre.

== Early life and education ==
Swan was born on the Cheyenne River Indian Reservation to Lakota parents in 1928. She was the fifth child of ten, of which only five survived to adulthood. Her father gave her the Lakota name Makoka Winge’ Win (lit. 'Goes Around The World Woman'). Her parents, James Hart Swan and Lucy Josephine High Pine-Swan, were born around the turn of the 20th century. James completed education at both Chilocco Indian Agricultural School, an Indian school in Oklahoma, where he would have been taught a skilled trade geared toward agriculture, and two years at Haskell Indian College, which was the equivalent to a junior college.

For the first five years of her life, the Swan family lived with Madonna's paternal great-uncle, known as Grandpa Puts On His Shoes, or Grandpa Puts for short. The family preserved traditional Lakota beliefs and customs of the traditional Indian lifestyle.

Swan attended Immaculate Conception, a Catholic boarding school in Stephan, South Dakota. She expressed great pleasure in attending school and played on the basketball team. In the fall of 1943, Swan learned that some of her classmates had tuberculosis (TB). Several girls died from what was termed "quick consumption".

== Tuberculosis treatment ==
In fall 1944, Swan was officially diagnosed with tuberculosis (Lakota: chanhu sica, lit. 'bad lung'), which was highly stigmatized. The Lakota considered it akin to a social disease, and homes that had a person with TB living in them were quarantined, and a red tag was attached to them. The tag was later removed when the person with TB died or went to the sanatorium. At the time, tuberculosis was treated with isolation in sanatoria and artificial pneumothorax, or lung compression.

=== Sioux Sanatorium ===
In December 1944, Madonna Swan was taken to the Sioux Sanatorium in Rapid City. During her many years there, Swan was treated for her TB through lung compression, which was thought to kill the bacterium that caused tuberculosis. Bean bags were placed on her chest while she lay flat on her back for hours on end. Another important part of the treatment regime for TB was enforced rest, together with a proper diet and a well-regulated hospital life. These were not, unfortunately, available to those at Indian sanatoria. The living conditions at Indian sanatoria were not favorable to recovery. The food was unvaried and substandard and infested with rodents and their droppings according to Madonna Swan's telling.

Although the drug streptomycin had been shown to kill mycobacterium tuberculosis, it was not available to patients at Indian sanatoria, at the time of Madonna Swan's confinement. Both the poor living conditions and the lack of medicine were common, as health care for the American Indian was substandard due to discrimination.

In the sixth year of her confinement in the sanatorium, Madonna's younger brother Orby, who also had tuberculosis, died. He had begged his sister to have their parents take him home from the sanatorium so that he could die at home. He was taken home and died later the same day. After being denied the opportunity to attend her brother's funeral, and with the thought of dying in the sanatorium, she left the sanatorium without permission and returned to her family home. Facing the threat of quarantine, her father refused to return Madonna to the Indian sanatorium. Instead, he wrote to an old school friend, Henry Standing Bear, who advised them to see a doctor in Pierre and gain admittance to the "white" TB sanatorium, Sanator, at Custer, South Dakota. The authorities denied her admittance to Sanator, telling them to return to the Sioux San. Madonna's father would not accept this denial and sought an audience with the governor of South Dakota, Judge Sigurd Anderson. Anderson, who considered himself somewhat of a pioneer for human rights, arranged for Madonna to be admitted to Sanator.

=== Sanator ===
Madonna was admitted to Sanator—the South Dakota Tuberculosis Sanatorium, in the community of Sanator—in September 1950. She found this hospital very different. The grounds around the building were landscaped with trees and flowers, and patients were allowed to wear their own clothing and walk around the grounds. Her doctor, Dr. W. L. Meyers, vowed to Madonna's parents that he would do everything in his power to help their daughter. The initial treatment was to pump air into the abdomen, and after that proved to be unsuccessful, they tried pumping air into her back to collapse the bad lung, which also failed. They next tried an operation called a phrenic which would permanently collapse her infected lung, which also failed to kill the TB.

After attending a conference on tuberculosis, Meyers learned of a procedure that was new in the United States. This operation required the removal of ribs and the upper lobe of her more infected lung, followed by another operation to remove the rest of the lung. Madonna Swan was one of the first patients to undergo this new procedure and much was learned about the treatment of TB from her experiences. Following the successful removal of lung and ribs, they were able to treat her remaining lung with an antibiotic designed to kill the TB bacteria (INH, Isoniazid).

With the removal of all of her ribs on one side, Madonna was paralyzed from her neck through her left arm and was unable to sit up. Battling depression, fitted with a brace to provide support, Madonna made a long and arduous recovery, gradually regaining sensation. While recovering she learned from reading and practice in the Sanator classroom how to repair jewelry. She received certification in horology (watch/clock repair).

== Later life ==
In 1953, more than ten years from first onset of symptoms of TB, Madonna was finally declared cured. She worked at Sanator as a receptionist and later left to work at repairing jewelry, watches and clocks. Her father died in 1953.

In 1956, she married Jay Abdalla, who was an army friend of her brother, Kermit. Together, Madonna and Jay raised Austin Paul, the son of her sister. Madonna became an aide in the Head Start program and later a teacher. She earned her Graduate Equivalency Diploma (General Educational Development - GED) in 1967. Although she completed 136 credit hours at the college level, Swan never earned a undergraduate degree due to her frail health. She took great pride in the accomplishments of her "son" Austin Paul, who graduated from college in 1979.

Madonna Swan-Abdalla was selected as the North American Indian Woman of the Year by her tribal sisters at Cheyenne River in 1983.
