= St. Joseph's Indian School =

Location
- near Chamberlain, South Dakota
- Coordinates: 43.8267°N 99.3234°W

Information
- Religious affiliation: Roman Catholic (Dehonian Fathers)
- Established: 1927; 99 years ago
- Founder: Fr. Henry Hogebach, SCJ
- President: Mike Tyrell
- Chairperson: Terry Johnson
- Athletics conference: Lakota Nation Invitational; Dakota Oyate Challenge.
- Sports: Archery, Basketball, Bowling
- Website: https://www.stjo.org/

St. Joseph's Indian School is an American Indian boarding school, run by the Congregation of the Priests of the Sacred Heart just outside the city of Chamberlain, South Dakota, on the east side of the Missouri River. The school, located in the Roman Catholic Diocese of Sioux Falls and named after Saint Joseph, is operated by a religious institute of pontifical right that is independent of the diocese. The school is within two hours of three reservations of the Lakota people: the Cheyenne River Indian Reservation, the Lower Brule Indian Reservation and the Crow Creek Indian Reservation, whose children comprise the majority of students at the school. The Akta Lakota Museum and Cultural Center is located on the campus and is owned by the school.

The school opened with 53 students in 1927. It was founded by Fr. Henry Hogebach, SCJ, who was a Catholic priest from Germany and a member of the Congregation of the Priests of the Sacred Heart. The provincial headquarters of the Congregation in the United States is in Hales Corners, Wisconsin, near Milwaukee. The institute owns and operates the mission school upon the site of two earlier education facilities: the Chamberlain Indian School operated here from 1898 to 1909, under the federal government. That year the school was closed and the facility was transferred to the Catholic Church for "college purposes". The Diocese of Sioux Falls operated Columbus College, a high school and college for Catholic boys, at this location until 1921, when the college was moved to Sioux Falls, South Dakota.

In 2020, St. Joseph's Indian School (kindergarten through eighth grade, K–8) served 221 students. The school also has a high school program where older students continue to live on campus but attend the public school in Chamberlain for classes.

St. Joseph's conducts fundraising to maintain operations that are free for the students. However, the administration's fundraising tactics were criticized in the 2010s by national media and Native American leaders as misleading. In 2009–2010, nearly one dozen former students sued the school, the Sacred Heart institute, and the Diocese of Sioux Falls for alleged sexual abuse by priests at the school. As noted, the Diocese of Sioux Falls has no authority over the school or the Institute, and has been excluded as the suit progresses.

== History ==
=== 1898–1923: Prior schools ===
In 1898 the Chamberlain Indian School was founded by the federal government in the town of that name in South Dakota, on the east bank of the Missouri River. It was operated to educate and assimilate Native American children from the Lakota reservations, and ran in that capacity until 1909. The facility was sold to the Catholic Church, as represented by Thomas O'Gorman, bishop of the Diocese of Sioux Falls, South Dakota. That year he opened Columbus College, a combined prep-school, high school, and the only Catholic college for boys in the state. It was operated by the Clerics of Saint Viator. In 1921 the college was moved to the larger city of Sioux Falls. The facilities in Chamberlain closed in 1923.

=== 1920s–1970s ===
In the early 1920s, some parents on the Lakota reservations expressed interest in gaining additional educational opportunities for their school-age children. In 1922 some Lakota asked the Catholic Church to establish a school on the Cheyenne River reservation. Priests of the Sacred Heart (referred to as the Dehonians) established a mission in the area in 1923, and worked to organize a school. They found they needed to have the school operation based in Chamberlain in order to have a reliable water supply from the Missouri River.

The Dehonians, who had been founded in 1888 in France, purchased the former complex of Columbus College in 1927. (Note: Note: The institute says that it established the school in 1928. (See http://dehoniansusa.org/vocations/meet-our-members/)) Led by Henry Hogebach, they opened St. Joseph's Indian School with 53 students. Hogebach had immigrated to the United States from Germany in 1923, where he first joined four other Catholic priests for training in Washington, DC, for missions in South Dakota. Hogebach served as the school's first superior and conducted missionary work among the Lakota for ten years before being transferred to the community house in Ste. Marie, Illinois.

In 1927 Hogebach cited Roman Catholic priest Father Edward J. Flanagan's orphanage Boys Town as his model for the school. By 1934 the Argus-Leader reported an enrollment of "120 pupils, from 5 to 17 years old", "made up of mostly orphans from the seven North and South Dakota reservations."

By 1929 Franciscan Sisters, based in Illinois, started assisting at St. Joseph's School. In the school's second year, they took in an orphan baby, cared for by the Sisters, who later became a student at the school.

Through the early- to mid-20th century, federal policy required Native American children to be educated toward assimilation, primarily in Indian boarding schools. Many boarding schools were staffed by religious organizations, and Protestants and Catholics evangelized their faith. At the schools, students were largely required to speak English into the 1970s and to practice some form of Christianity.

=== 1970s–present ===
During the mid to late 20th century, Native Americans organized to regain more sovereignty over their lands and families, with the right to educate their children near home and in their own cultures. A Senate report (known as the Kennedy Report) in 1969 detailed the failings of the BIA's system of education. Federal policy changed over the next several years to provide more sovereignty and independence to federally recognized tribes. Legislation was passed in 1975 authorizing them to contract with the BIA and to manage educational funds for schools they operated. Many tribes took over mission schools located on their reservations, or established new schools for K-12 on their reservations to ensure their children could be educated at home and in their culture. As an independent off-reservation school, St. Joseph's operates with monies it can raise.

The issue of choice and agency by the parents can be considered dependent on both parental living conditions, and on the information they receive about these schools. When interviewed by St. Joseph's alumna Kathie Marie Bowker in her dissertation, The Boarding School Legacy: Ten Contemporary Lakota Women Tell Their Stories, six former students from St. Joseph's, who attended during their primary school years, have said they were given prewritten text to copy for letters they sent home to their parents:

The women who attended St. Josephs Indian School reported that they could not tell their parents of the abuse in letters because all letters were written for them. They stated that when they wrote letters home they were required to copy text from a classroom blackboard. These letters contained generic phrases and this is what was mailed home to parents. This explains why parents thought their students were doing fine at the boarding school, as their letters stated they were.

Women in this study also reported poverty and rural isolation being a primary reason for being sent to boarding school, that they were too far away from any bus routes to other schools, that they came from large families that were struggling to support them, and that, "they thought we were safe with the nuns and priests."

In 2018, the Sacred Heart institute had 100 priests in South Dakota and some served with the institute on three of the state's nine reservations: Cheyenne River Sioux Tribe, Lower Brule Sioux Tribe and the Crow Creek Sioux Tribe. These reservations are within two hours of St. Joseph's School and thus, the institute primarily serves Native American youth and their families. In January 2020, Mary Farrow of the Catholic News Agency responded to reporting of past practices and assimilation pressures by Priests of the Sacred Heart and Franciscan Sisters who served at the school. She interviewed Clare Willrodt, director of communications and outreach for St. Joseph’s, who said that St Joseph's staff and affiliates do not forcibly remove Lakota children from their homes, but that parents and families of students decide whether to send them to the school. Farrow adds that the school now encourages some study of Lakota culture and language, at the school, engaging in active inculturation of Catholicism rather than assimilation to an arbitrary standard. Programs and events at the school include Native American-related cultural activities.

As of January 2020, the school served 221 children in grades K-8, who lived in family-style housing. Some students of high school age are allowed to continue living there after graduating, where they attend the local public high school in Chamberlain. The school conducts considerable tutoring, has small class sizes, and provides individualized attention to aid students. The school offers educational, residential and counseling programs. It also has a transition committee to work with students to prepare them for life after graduation. In a 2019 reunion, a panel of six alumni "commended the preparation they received for post-high school life from St. Joseph's Indian School Transitions program, which consciously works with students in the upper high school grades to teach studying, budgeting, meal preparation, independent living, and more."

Since 1976 the school has offered a bookmobile program. During 2020, due to the Covid-19 pandemic, the program distributed books to South Dakota communities instead of loaning them. Its current collection includes Native American books by Native American authors. They also operate a thrift store that collects and distributes donated items to the Eagle Butte, Wanblee, Okreek, Fort Thompson, Martin, Kyle, Allen, Mission, and Potato Creek communities.

== Facilities ==
The school suffered a major fire in 1931 that damaged the main building, which included the kitchen and other support facilities for the boarding school. Classes had to be held in temporary quarters until the structure was rebuilt.

In 1956 the Our Lady of the Sioux Chapel was constructed on campus. When it was refurbished in 1985, the school commissioned stained glass windows from artist Ron Zeilinger to represent seven sacred rites in Lakota practice: vision seeking, purification by use of a sweat lodge, the Sun Dance, keeping of the soul, and others. Behind the altar hangs a tapestry known as the Indian Christ, adapted from a painting of that name by nationally recognized artist Oscar Howe (Crow Creek Sioux). His original painting is displayed in the Akta Lakota Museum.

=== Akta Lakota Museum ===
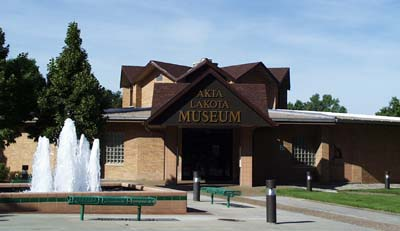
The Akta Lakota Museum

In 1991 the school opened the Akta Lakota Museum and Cultural Center in a former school building on campus as part of its education outreach. The Lakota name means "to honor the people". The building has 14,000-square feet of display space and shows a variety of art, artifacts and other materials about Lakota culture. It includes a gallery where local artists can sell their work.

=== Staffing ===
None of the Priests of the Sacred Heart at the school have been Native American, according to Leonard Pease, Vice Chairman of the Crow Creek Sioux. The school's president Michael Tyrell said that as of 2014, nine percent of the staff were Native Americans; that staffing includes teachers, counselors, house parents, custodians, residential training, accounting, and family outreach.

== Alleged abuse ==
In 2010, a lawsuit filed against St. Joseph's reached the South Dakota Supreme Court. In it, eight former students alleged abuse by specific named priests and staff at the school in the 1970s, when the students were minors. One of the alleged abuser priests has since died.

Originally, the suits included the Diocese of Sioux Falls as a defendant, but the diocese has no authority over the religious institutes that ran several Indian boarding and mission schools in South Dakota including Priests of the Sacred Heart at St. Joseph's.

The Sacred Heart institute has been named as defendants in several other sex abuse cases. Other religious organizations that operated Indian mission schools in the territory of the Diocese of Sioux Falls have also been sued for alleged abuse that occurred at these places. Prosecuting the cases has in some instances been difficult as decades have passed since some of the alleged abuses occurred and some of the named perpetrators have died. Lower court rulings have addressed whether the cases can proceed despite this.

In 2010, the South Dakota legislature passed HB1104, an amendment to its childhood sexual abuse bill that barred "anyone 40 or older from recovering damages from anyone but the actual perpetrator of sexual abuse." The bill was created by Steven Smith, an attorney for St Joseph's representing them against similar abuse allegations. In regards to the school's attorney creating the bill to protect his client's interests, Representative Steve Hickey (District 9), said, "I consider how this went down to be scandalous and shameful. Who are we kidding, that fact greatly reinforces a church cover-up of abuses seen here and documented extensively elsewhere". He later tried to repeal the bill, but was unsuccessful.

The passage of the bill meant that the religious institutes and schools were protected from suits for abuses allegedly perpetrated by their members against children attending these schools in the mid-20th century. According to David Clohessy, executive director of SNAP (Survivors Network of those Abused by Priests), South Dakota was an outlier in states by passing a bill that gave protection to the organizations that had covered up abuse and protected perpetrators. Recognizing that it may take decades for survivors of child abuse to come forward, other states have loosened statutes of limitation related to these crimes.

In order to provide a legal option for its citizens after passage of HB1104, the Sisseton Wahpeton Oyate's tribal court passed a statue that would allow tribal members to file civil claims related to sexual abuse in tribal court. This statute is the first of its kind in the country. As attorney Vito De La Cruz notes, "All tribes have criminal child-sex-abuse statutes, but this is the first civil one and allows plaintiffs whose cases have been dismissed in other jurisdictions to file in tribal court".

In January 2012 the South Dakota Supreme Court ruled that it would hear the lawsuit against Priests of the Sacred Heart for alleged abuses at St. Joseph's and not apply HB1104 retroactively to their cases. Although the Institute is based near Milwaukee, Wisconsin, the Roman Catholic Diocese of Milwaukee does not have any authority over it. The religious order operates independently, as have others that have run mission and boarding schools throughout Indian country.

In a 2015 interview for the National Catholic Reporter, Zigmund Hollow Horn of the Cheyenne River Lakota told Vinnie Rotandaro of being abused during his eight years at the St. Joseph's. He said his father had sent him there at age 5; his mother had died in childbirth and Hollow Horn had been in quarantine for tuberculosis. Hollow Horn said that the children, in addition to chores and schoolwork, "went to church three times a day, constantly, day in, day out". Rotondaro summarized, "Standing in the pews, away from their family, their culture banished and condemned, some children would faint". Hollow Horn continued:

And when they faint, there's no mercy. They just drag you out, take you to the back of the pews somewhere, and they slap you up, wake you up, give you water or whatever. … Then they take you back again, put you in your pew. Classmates were regularly hit or whipped with a belt. The older classmates would hold you down. They had to hold you down. That's an order. They got us when we were young. I used to speak my native tongue when I went down there, and I can't even talk now. They beat it out of me. If you spoke your language, they held you down, put a bar of soap in your mouth.

== Fundraising issues ==
In the 2010s, St. Joseph's School was investigated for several issues related to its fundraising practices. In 2013 the school failed to meet the BBB Wise Giving Alliance standards for charity accountability. In 2014, the fundraising practices of St. Joseph's School were investigated by CNN. Native American leaders complained that the school's solicitations could be classified as "poverty porn" and that they stressed only the social ills of Indian country. CNN quoted Leonard Pease, Chairman of the Crow Creek Sioux, who said "...a school run by non-Indians is raising a fortune off of racial stereotypes..."

The school has sent out frequent mass mailings to raise funds, featuring sales of dreamcatchers made in China to raise money, and emotional letters of appeal that claimed to tell students' stories. However, Leonard Pease says there are no Native children by those names from the communities St. Joseph's says they are from. CNN described these appeals as "fictitious pleas for help." The school's spokespeople admitted the letters and children are not real but insisted, "Those are real stories, but it would be hard to pin them on any one child". Additionally, the school ignores requests by recipients of their mailings that the mailings be discontinued.

According to an interview with President Tyrell of the school by Indian Country Today in November 2014, the Better Business Bureau (BBB) described the school's fundraising letters from children as "misleading appeals". Also, President Tyrell said that the BBB had earlier criticized the school for soliciting funds based on not having enough money to heat the school. At the time, the school appeared to have millions of dollars available for such needs.

In 2014 the school's attorney reportedly told Indian Country Today that they would end use of such student letters in fundraising. But in 2017, the school reportedly made $51 million from donors, and the next year continued to mail out thousands of so-called student letters seeking charitable donations. As of November 2018, the school continued this direct mail campaign. They have also been criticized for the mass mailings based on expense: Kimberly Palmer of US News considers this to be an expensive fund raising method. As of 2026, the mailings with fundraising pleas and dreamcatchers continue.

== See also ==
- Civilizing mission
- Cultural assimilation of Native Americans
- Indian boarding schools
- Poverty porn
- Stereotypes of Native Americans
