= Seal of Bulacan =

Philippines provincial symbol

- Armiger: Bulacan
- Shield: Tierced per fess: on chief Azure two hills proper, above them a pair of clouds Argent; on fess Bleu celeste the Barasoain Church proper upon ground Vert; and on base Gules three sampaguita flowers proper
- Motto: Province of Bulacan
- Other elements: bamboo

The Seal of Bulacan is one of the official symbols of the province of Bulacan in the Philippines, established under Act No. 2711, on 10 March 1917.

== Description ==
On the chief of the shield of seal of Bulacan is an image of the hills of Kakarong and Biak-na-Bato in the municipalities of Pandi and San Miguel, respectively. These hills were the location where the Bulacan-based republics are proclaimed; the Kakarong Republic and the Republic of Biak-na-Bato. The main color is blue, matching the shade of the Philippine flag, symbolizing peace, truth, and justice.

The Barásoain Church can be found on the fess of the shield. The church was the site of the First Philippine Congress, which was convened in 1898, and the declaration of the First Philippine Republic in the same year.

The three sampaguita (Jasminum sambac) flowers on the lower portion of the shield represent the three republics claimed in Bulacan—Kakarong (1896), Biak-na-Bato (1897), and the Philippine Republic (1898). The lower part of the shield is red, matching the shade of red on the flag of the Philippines, which symbolizes patriotism and valor.

The shield is surrounded by bamboo, which represents the spears and lances used by the Katipuneros during the Philippine Revolution. These were believed to be made from a type of bamboo known in Tagalog as anos, bukawe, or kawayang bansot (lit. "stunted bamboo"; Schizostachyum lima). The bamboo also symbolizes the resilience of the province's inhabitants.

The words PROVINCE OF BULACAN and OFFICIAL SEAL are present in the seal. "1578" can also be optionally placed on top of the shield to represent the foundation year of the province.
