= Chamberlain Manganese Deposits =

Location
- Location: South Dakota, United States

Production
- Products: Manganese

The Chamberlain Manganese Deposits are located in north-central United States near Chamberlain, South Dakota. The Chamberlain Deposits represent one of the largest manganese reserves in the United States having estimated reserves of 2 billion tons of manganese ore grading 0.6% manganese metal. Although plentiful, the grade is so low in concentration that manganese recovery is not economically feasible.
