= Bulacan =

Province in Central Luzon, Philippines

- Province
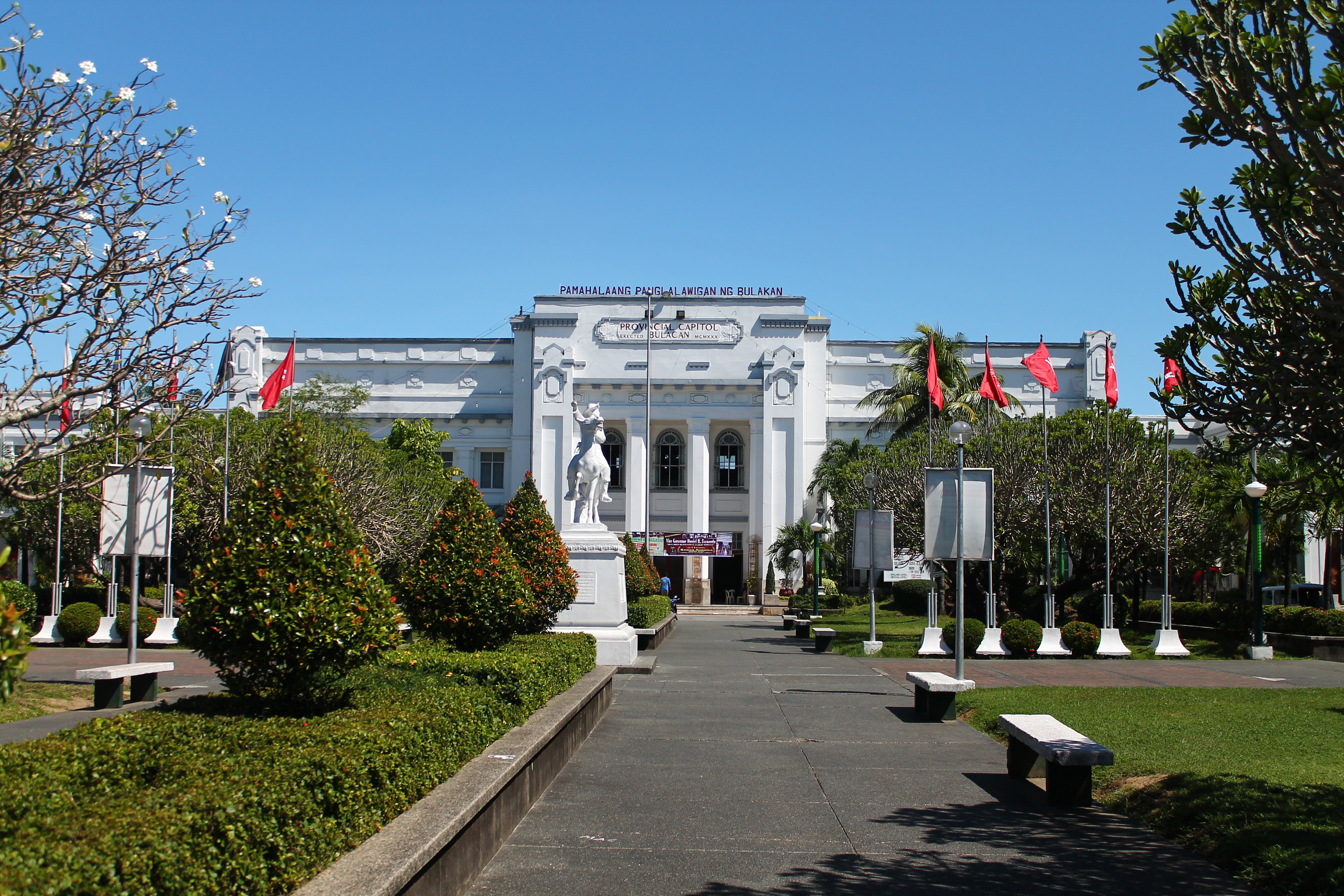
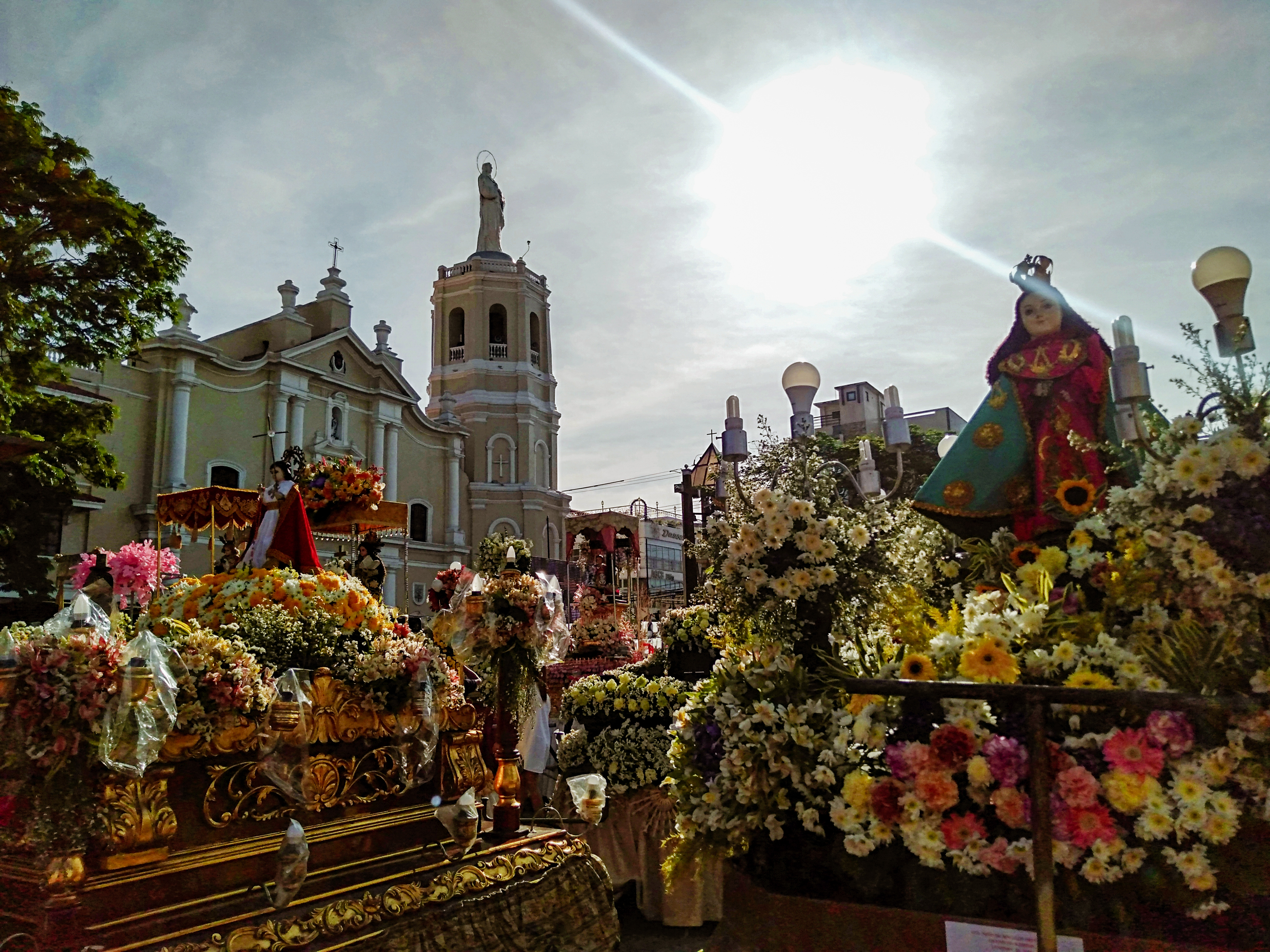
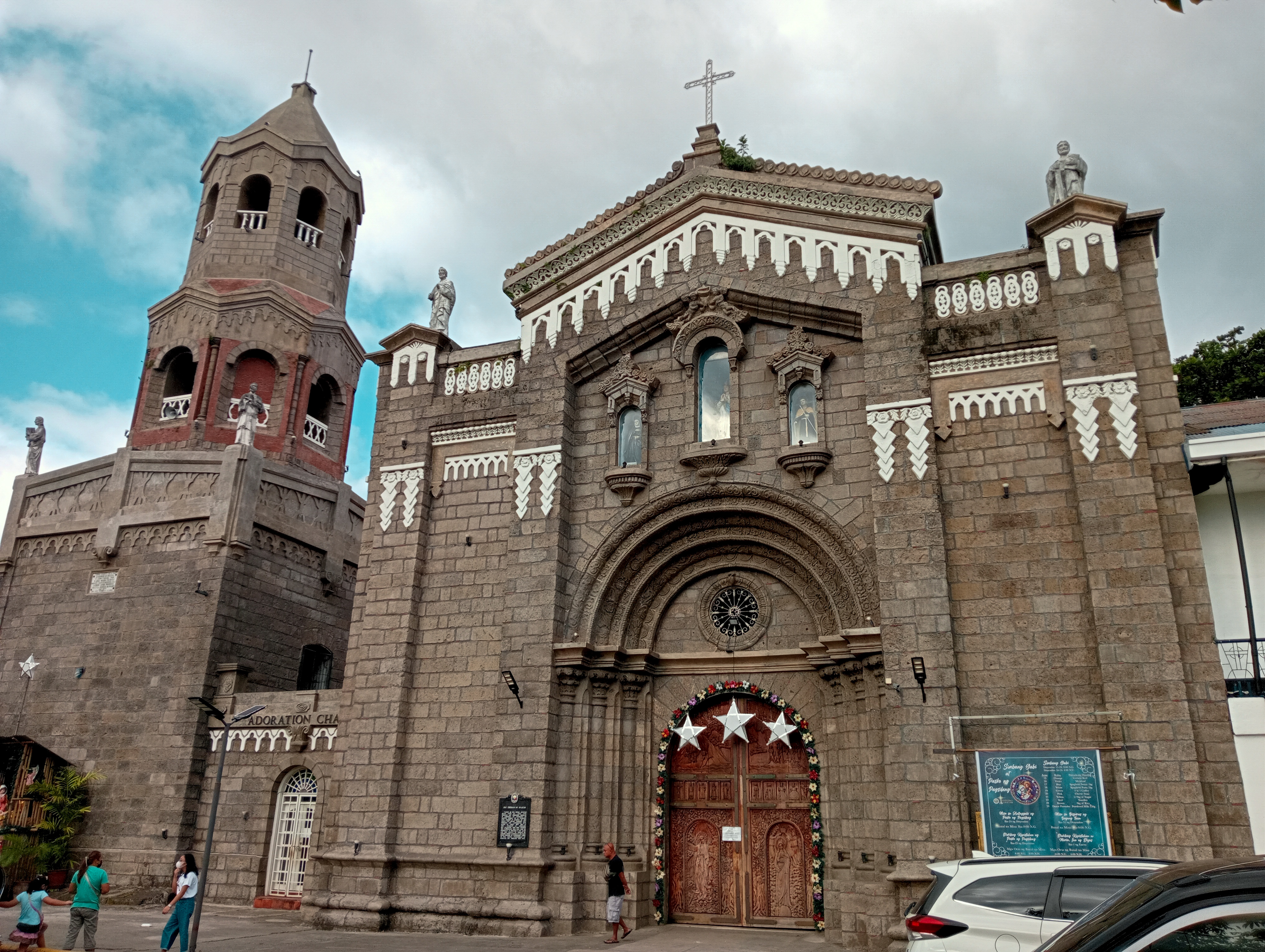
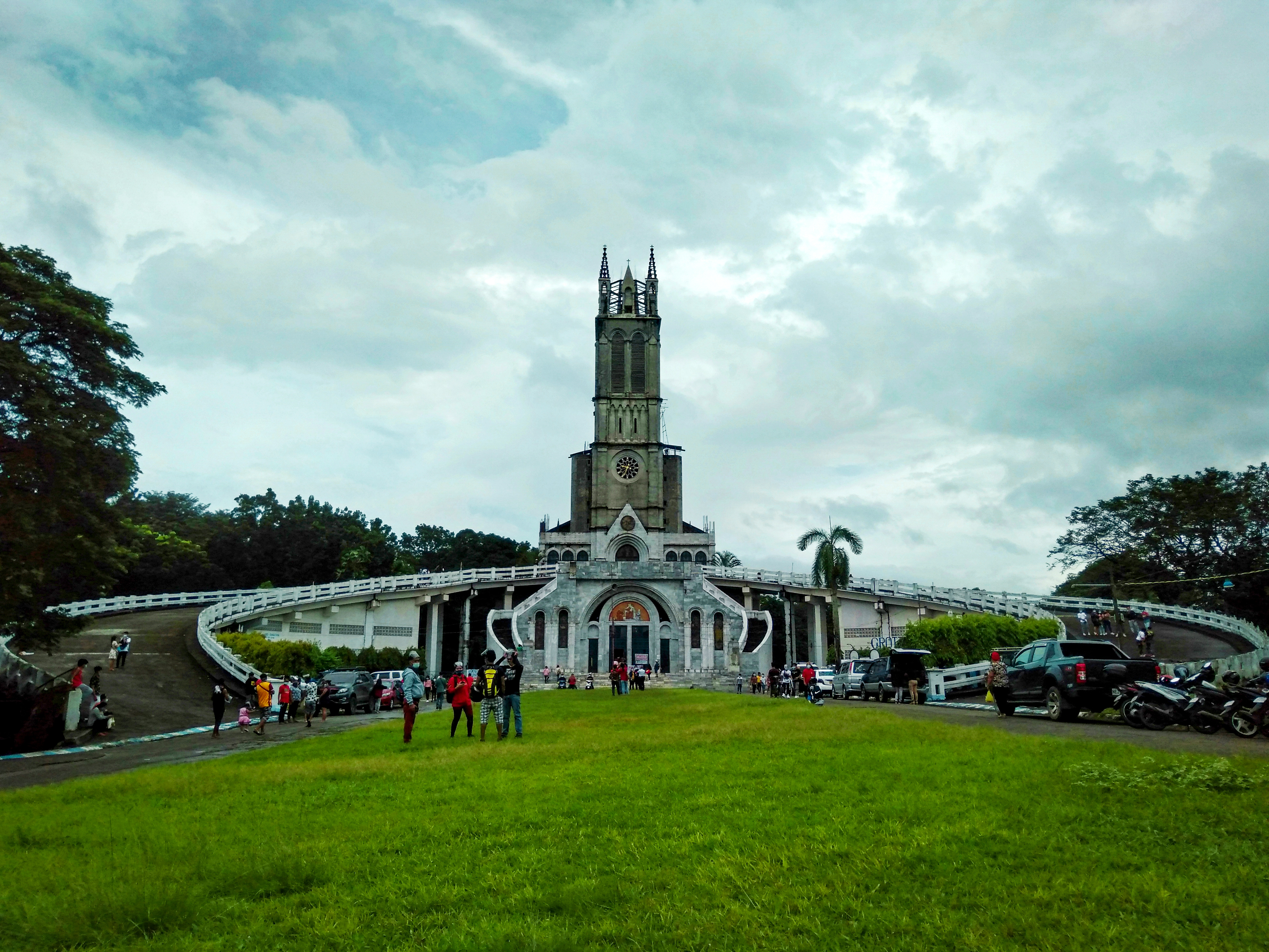
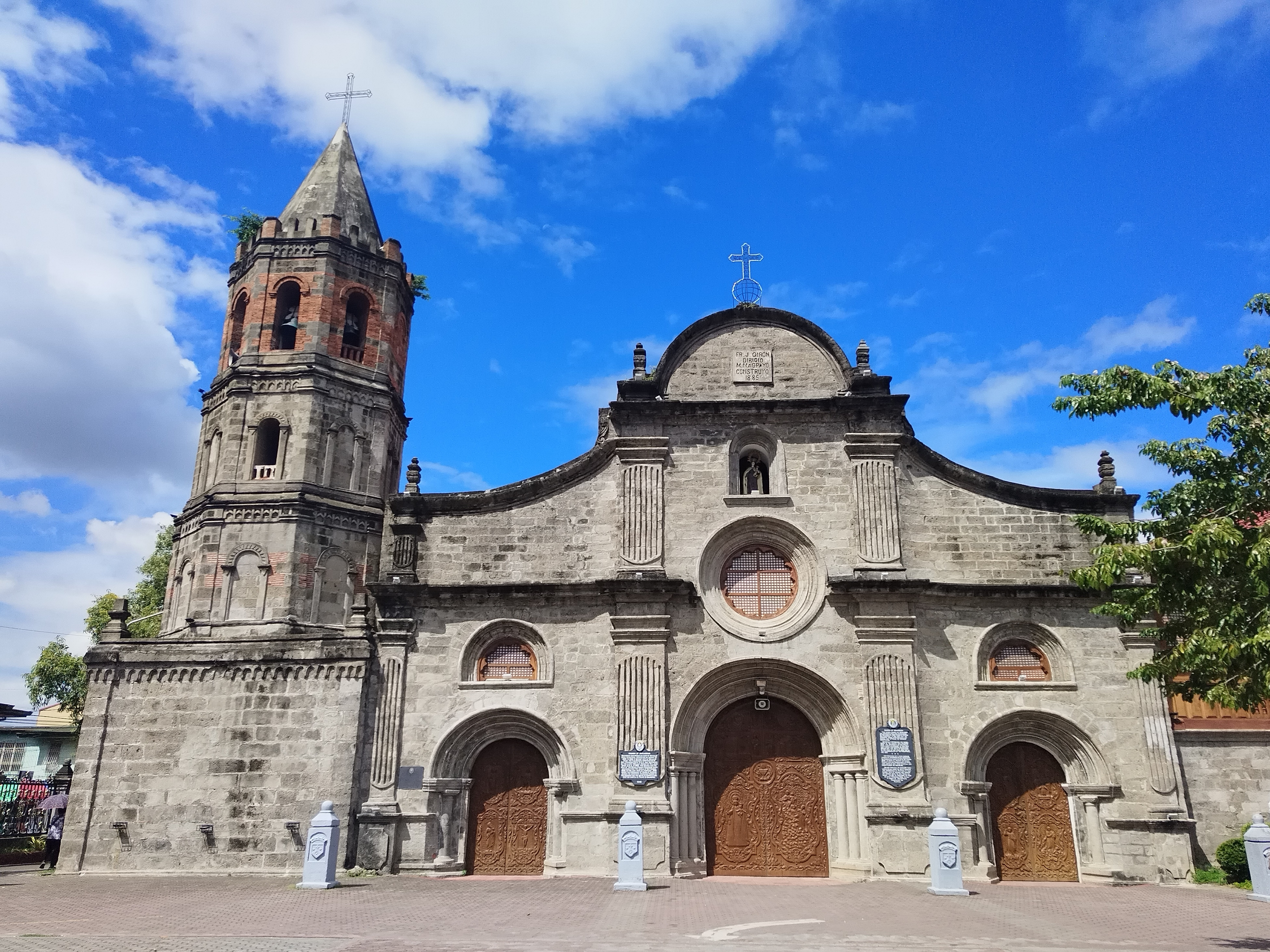
- From the top, left to right: Bulacan Provincial Capitol, Malolos Cathedral, Bulakan Church, Philippine Arena, Our Lady of Lourdes Grotto Shrine, Barasoain Church

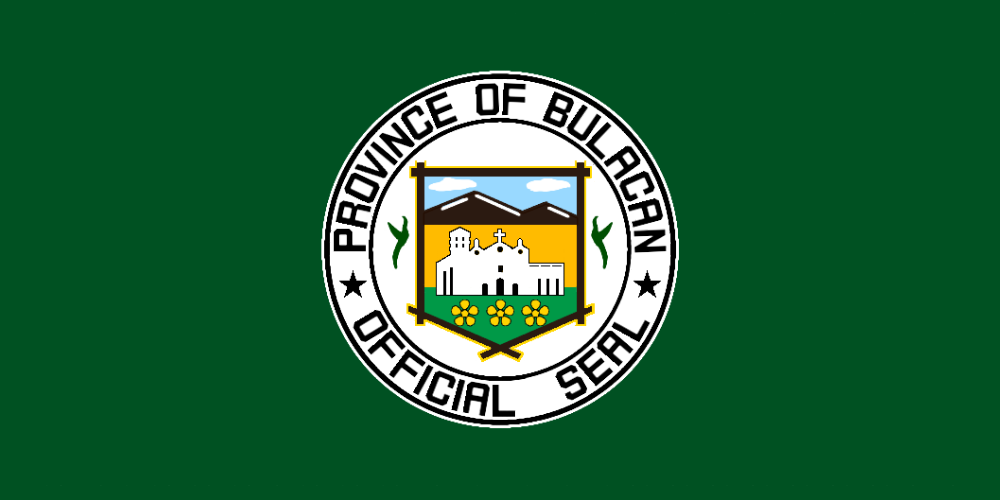
- Flag Seal
- Nicknames: We, the South of Central Luzon; Metro Manila Greater Area; Cradle of the Nation's Noble Heroes
- Motto(s): Dakilang Bulacan (English: "Great Bulacan")
- Anthem: Himno ng Bulacan (English: "Hymn of Bulacan")
- Location in the Philippines
- Interactive map of Bulacan
- Coordinates: 15°00′N 121°05′E
- Country: Philippines
- Region: Central Luzon
- Founded: August 15, 1578
- Capital: Malolos
- Largest city: San Jose del Monte

Government
  - Governor: Daniel R. Fernando (NUP)
  - Vice Governor: Alexis C. Castro (NUP)
  - Legislature: Bulacan Provincial Board
  - Electorate: 2,173,026 voters (2025)

Area
  - Total: 2,796.10 km^{2} (1,079.58 sq mi)
  - Rank: 46th out of 82
- Highest elevation (Mount Oriod): 1,188 m (3,898 ft)

Population (2024 census)
  - Total: 3,876,806
  - Rank: 2nd out of 82
  - Density: 1,386.50/km^{2} (3,591.03/sq mi)
  - Rank: 4th out of 82
  - Households: 920,608
- Demonyms: Bulakenyo (m/n); Bulakenya (f); Bulacanense

Divisions
  - Independent cities: 0
  - Component cities: 4: Baliwag; Malolos; Meycauayan; San Jose del Monte
  - Municipalities: 20: Angat; Balagtas; Bocaue; Bulakan; Bustos; Calumpit; Doña Remedios Trinidad; Guiguinto; Hagonoy; Marilao; Norzagaray; Obando; Pandi; Paombong; Plaridel; Pulilan; San Ildefonso; San Miguel; San Rafael; Santa Maria
  - Barangays: 569
  - Districts: Legislative districts of Bulacan; Legislative district of San Jose del Monte

Economy
  - Income class: 1st provincial income class
  - Poverty incidence: 6% (2023)
  - Revenue: ₱ 8,881 million (2024)
  - Assets: ₱ 15,477 million (2024)
  - Expenditure: ₱ 7,433 million (2024)
  - Liabilities: ₱ 2,159 million (2024)
- Time zone: UTC+8 (PHT)
- PSGC: 031400000
- IDD : area code: +63 (0)44
- ISO 3166 code: PH-BUL
- Ethnic groups: Tagalog (90%); Kapampangan (8%); Pangasinan (1%); Others (0.9%)
- Spoken languages: Tagalog; Kapampangan; Filipino; English
- Website: www.bulacan.gov.ph

Bulacan, officially the Province of Bulacan (Tagalog: Lalawigan ng Bulacan), is a province in the Philippines located in the Central Luzon region. Its capital is the city of Malolos. Bulacan was established on August 15, 1578, and part of the Metro Luzon Urban Beltway Super Region. This province is a part of the Greater Manila Area.

It has 572 barangays in 20 municipalities and four component cities (Baliwag, Malolos the provincial capital, Meycauayan, and San Jose del Monte the largest city). Bulacan is located immediately north of Metro Manila. Bordering Bulacan are the provinces of Pampanga to the west, Nueva Ecija to the north, Aurora and Quezon to the east, and Metro Manila and Rizal to the south. Bulacan also lies on the north-eastern shore of Manila Bay.

In the 2024 census, Bulacan had a population of 3,876,806 people, the most populous in Central Luzon and the third most populous in the Philippines, after Cebu and Cavite. Bulacan's most populated city is San Jose del Monte, the most populated municipality is Santa Maria, while the least populated is Doña Remedios Trinidad yet the largest municipality in terms of area.

In 1899, the historic Barasoain Church in Malolos was the birthplace of the First Philippine Republic, sometimes described as the first constitutional democracy in Asia.

On November 7, 2018, the Provincial Government of Bulacan bagged its fourth Seal of Good Local Governance award. The SGLG award is a progressive assessment system that gives distinction to remarkable governance performance.

== Etymology ==
The name Bulacan was named after the town Bulakan which is derived from the Tagalog word bulak, which means cotton in the English language. It is due to the abundance of cotton plant growing in the region.

== History ==
=== Spanish colonial period ===
The conquest of the area comprising present-day Bulacan traces to the first years of the Spanish in the Philippines. Upon the defeat of the Macabebe and Hagonoy forces led by Bambalito in the Battle of Bangkusay on June 3, 1571, Martín de Goiti to proceeded north, first to Lubao in September 1571.

Two months later, on November 14, 1571, Goiti reached Malolos and Calumpit, respectively, and it was reported to Adelantado Miguel Lopez de Legazpi, the first Governor-General of the Philippines. Adelantado established Calumpit and Malolos as an encomienda entrusted to Sargento Juan Moron (Morones in other documents) and Don Marcos de Herrera. These two conquistadores were one of the first group of conquerors accompanied by Legaspi who have arrived in the Islands in 1565.

On April 5, 1572, the encomiendas of Calumpit and Malolos were unified and co-administered by Moron and Herrera. Also in that year, Alcaldia de Calumpit was formed in which the areas of Macabebe, Candaba, Apalit in Pampanga, and the settlements of Meyto, Panducot, Meysulao, and Malolos. On December 28, 1575, Governor-General Francisco Sande ordered to include Hagonoy in Calumpit.

In 1575, Bulakan was established as a visita of Tondo, and it is not part of Calumpit as the boundary between Tondo and Calumpit was marked in Mambog River and placed the statue of Our Lady of Visitacion (patroness of Calumpit) was erected. It was gone and recreated in 1997 upon the re-establishment of the Roman Catholic Parish of Our Lady of Presentacion in Malolos.

On April 30, 1578, the town of Bulakan was officially established by the Augustinians, with Fray Diego Vivar as its first prior, and the convent was dedicated to San Agustin; when this was changed to Our Lady of Assumption is uncertain. It was reported that the western part of present-day Bulacan was to be very well-populated and rich. There is no documentation of the exact year and date when the Alcaldia de Calumpit was dissolved nor of the exact foundation year of the province of Bulacan. It has only been documented that Malolos (then part of Calumpit in 1572) was first to appear as part of Alcaldia de Bulacan in 1582. It may be assumed that the reorganization of encomiendas occurred between 1580 and 1582 at the time of Governor-General Gonzalo Ronquillo de Peñalosa.

The same document, also from the 1582 Relacion de las Islas Filipinas by Miguel de Loarca, reports that Alcaldia de Calumpit had jurisdiction in the areas of Calumpit (the capital), Capalangan, Cabangbangan and Hagonoy, which made up the Alcaldia's villages. Then Loarca mentioned that Alcaldia de Bulacan had Bulakan (its capital), Malolos, Caluya, Guguinto, Binto and Catanghalan (instead of Meycauayan) as its encomiendas, which formerly had one alcalde (mayor), though Loarca wrote that Alcaldia de Bulacan was formed in 1580 at the time of Peñalosa.

According to the document of Governor-General Luis Pérez Dasmariñas in the Account of the Encomiendas for the King of Spain furnished on June 21, 1591, the Alcaldia of Bulacan was part of La Pampanga with the Encomiendas subject to it such as the Encomiendas of Malolos (3,600 persons), Binto (2,000 persons), Guiguinto (2,000 persons), Caluya (2,800 persons), Mecabayan (2,800 persons) and Bulacan identified as " capital" and residence of "alcalde mayor" with 4,800 persons. In the same 1591 document, it was mentioned that "Calumpit y Hagonoy" belonged to Juan Moron with 12,800 persons, 2 Augustinian Convents, and 1 Alcalde Mayor of its own.

However, the establishment and development of the southern part of present-day Bulacan were not simultaneous and identified with the West. In 1578, the Order of Friars Minor, headed by Juan de Plasencia and Diego Oropesa, arrived in the area called Toril (now part of Meycauayan) and their headquarters. Also in 1578, Plasencia established the Town of Meycauayan. Its pueblos were first only settlements of the Old Meycauayan, founded by Franciscan

The province of Bulacan is on the island of Luzon and is one of the most important Alcadias de Termino. Civilly and politically it corresponds to the Audiencia y capitanía general de Filipinas and spiritually belongs to the Archbishop of Manila. Franciscan friars Juan Plasencia and Fray Diego de Oropesa founded Meycauayan in 1578, and for a time it was the capital of the province of Meycauayan (which differs from Western Bulacan, administered by Augustinian Order since 1572). The Meycauayan people were able to flourish and became so rich that their sons were six of the best in the then-Province of Meycauayan. These were the towns of Bocaue, Polo, San Jose del Monte, Santa Maria de Pandi, Obando and Marilao).

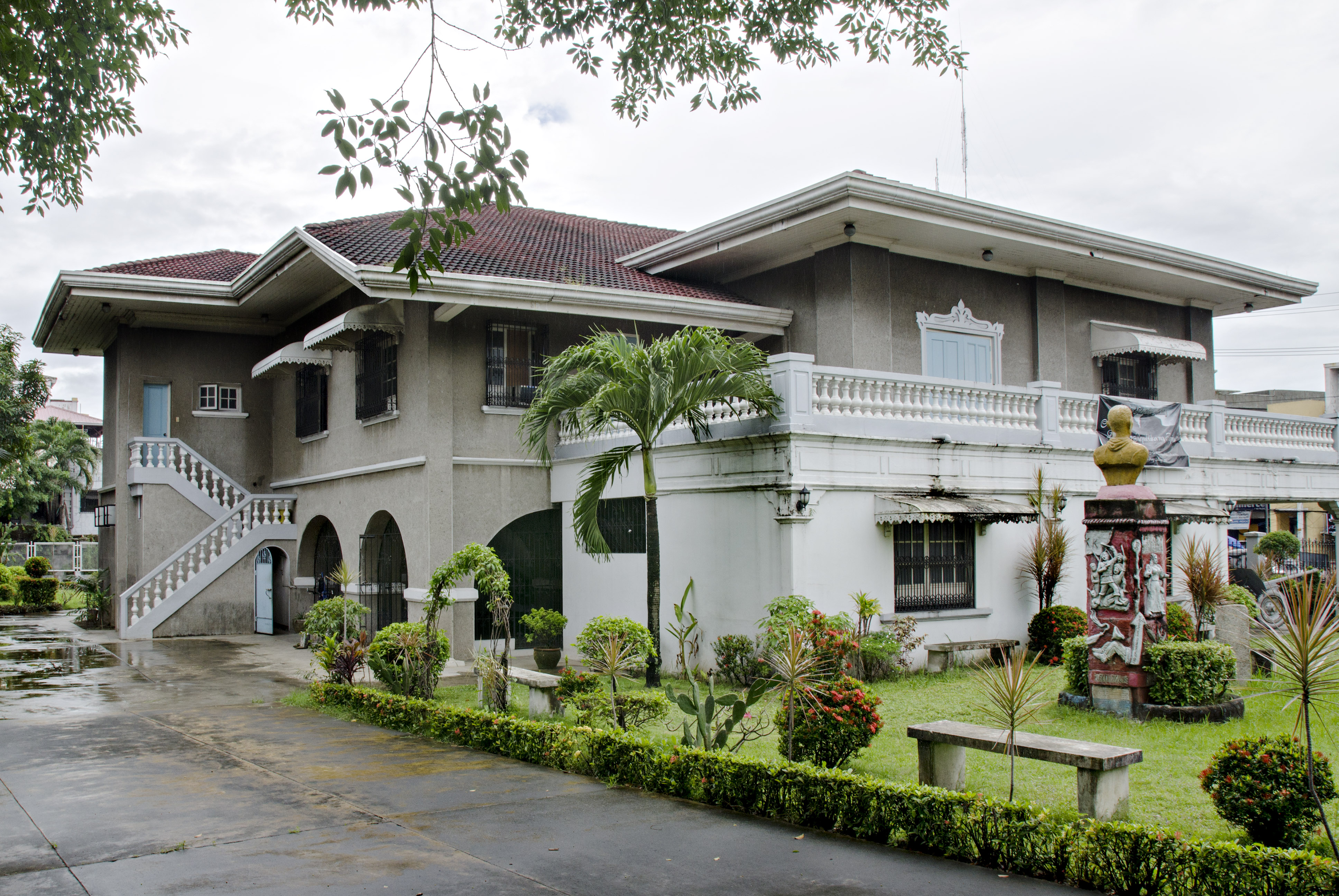
The Casa Real de Malolos. Served as the office and residency of the Governor of Malolos.

During the General Visitation of October 5, 1762, by Don Simón de Anda y Salazar, the province was headed by Capitan Don Jose Pasarin, alcalde mayor of the province. 1795–96, Don Manuel Piñon was the alcalde mayor.

In the same year, British occupation of Manila happened, and many Tagalog refugees from Manila & north areas of Cavite escaped to Bulacan and to neighboring Nueva Ecija, where the original Kapampangan settlers welcomed them. Bulacan, along with Nueva Ecija, was natively Kapampangan when Spaniards arrived. Majority of Kapampangans sold their lands to the newly-arrived Tagalog settlers and others intermarried with and assimilated to the Tagalog, which made Bulacan dominantly Tagalog.

In 1774, authorities from Bulacan, Tondo, Laguna Bay, and other areas surrounding Manila reported with consternation that discharged soldiers and deserters (from Mexico, Spain and Peru) were providing Indios military training for the weapons that had been disseminated all over the territory during the British war.

By the end of the 1700s, Bulacan had 16,586 native families and 2,007 Spanish Filipino families who were mestizos. By 1818, the census noted an increase of tributes or families totalling to around 50,441 tributes or families, of which there were 6 Spanish families who were settlers from Spain, and 164 were new Spanish-Filipino Mestizo families (with the old 2,007 Spanish-Filipino mestizo families having been absorbed into the native category), 3 converted Negroes (Blacks) families, and 7 newly Christianized Chinese-Filipino families.

Of the new Spanish-Filipino families, these were their number and places of residency: 11 at Polo, 16 at Meycauayan, 28 at Marilao, 88 at Bocaue, 17 at Santa Maria de Pandi, and 10 at San Rafael.

According to the "Guia de 1839", Bulacan province on the island of Luzon, Philippines, was governed by a mayor and consisted of 19 pueblos, 36,394 tributes and 181,970 souls. D. Felipe Gobantes, Alcalde of the province of Bulacan erected a stone column in the plaza of Bulacan in Memory of Fr. Manuel Blanco O.S.A. who died on April 1, 1845.

In 1848, when the boundaries of Pampanga were changed, the region, which includes the important town of San Miguel de Mayumo and neighboring places that were formerly part of Pampanga, was adjudicated to Bulacan. Bulacan also had claims on the present-day eastern portion of Rizal, northern portion of Santa Maria, Laguna, and western portion of General Nakar and Real in Quezon (formerly Tayabas).

==== The Philippine Revolution ====
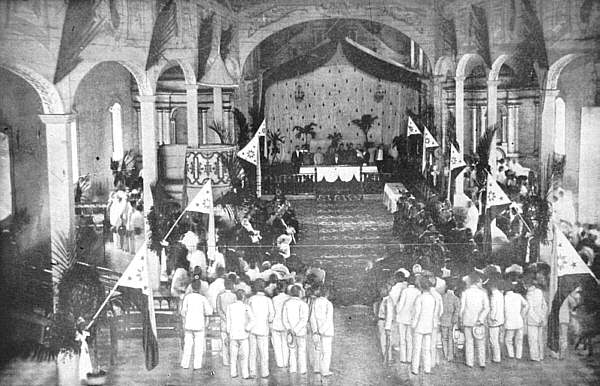
Opening of the Malolos Congress (1898)

In an earlier period during 1890, Malolos was a hot spot of Liberal Ilustrados, notably the "20 Women of Malolos", who exerted pressure for education under Filipino professors. However, the first phase of the revolution ceased in 1897 with the signing of the Pact of Biak-na-Bato in San Miguel. Under its terms, the leaders of the revolution were to go to Hong Kong and reside there. Under the illusory peace created by the pact, the end of 1897 saw greater determination on the part of the Filipinos to carry on the revolutionary struggle.

In early 1898, the provinces of Zambales, Ilocos, Pampanga, Bulacan, Laguna, Pangasinan, Nueva Ecija, Tarlac, and Camarines rose again. In Central Luzon, a revolutionary government was organized under General Francisco Macabulos, a Kapampangan revolutionary leader of La Paz, Tarlac.

Pandi was, in 1896-97, with the "Kakarong Republic", the early epicenter of revolutionary fevor. Despite its defeat in the Battle of Kakarong de Sili, the memory of the Kakarong defenders still remain as part of the history and heritage of Bulacan as the first organized revolutionary government established in the era of the Revolution.

=== American colonial period ===
The Americans established a local Philippine government in the Philippines when they held the first municipal election in the country in Baliwag on May 6, 1899. At the beginning of the American rule, 1899–1900, Malolos became the headquarters of the Military Governor of the Philippines at Casa Real. On February 27, 1901, the Philippine Commission officially transferred the seat of government to Malolos, and the Casa Real de Malolos was the seat of the Provincial Governor from 1900 to 1930 until the completion of the capitol building at Guinhawa, Malolos.

=== Japanese occupation ===
In 1942, at the height of World War II, the Japanese Imperial Army occupied Bulacan and made Casa Real de Malolos its headquarters. In 1945, combined Filipino and American forces and local guerrillas attacked the Japanese Imperial Forces and liberated Bulacan.

After the war, Bulacan was embroiled in the Hukbalahap Rebellion. In February 1945, Huk Squadron 77 composed of 109 veteran guerillas was surrounded, shot, and buried in a mass grave in Malolos.

=== Martial law era ===
The beginning months of the 1970s marked a period of turmoil and change in the Philippines, as well as in Bulacan. During his bid to be the first Philippine president to be re-elected for a second term, Ferdinand Marcos launched an unprecedented number of foreign debt-funded public works projects. This caused the Philippine economy took a sudden downwards turn known as the 1969 Philippine balance of payments crisis, which in turn led to a period of economic difficulty and a significant rise of social unrest.

With only a year left in his last constitutionally allowed term as president, Ferdinand Marcos placed the Philippines under Martial Law in September 1972 and thus retained the position for fourteen more years. This period in Philippine history is remembered for the Marcos administration's record of human rights abuses, particularly targeting political opponents, student activists, journalists, religious workers, farmers, and others who fought against the Marcos dictatorship.

By this time, the social unrest of the pre-martial law period and the Marcos' violent responses to the protests of the time led many of the Philippines' youth, who previously held moderate positions calling for political reform, to be radicalized. Some were convinced to joined the newly-formed New People's Army as a last desperate way to resist Marcos' authoritarianism. On June 21, 1982, a group of young activists opposing the Marcos dictatorship tried to help farmers form a local chapter of Alyansa ng Magbubukid sa Gitnang Luzon (AMLG). They were arrested by armed soldiers from the 175th Philippine Constabulary Company and were found dead the following day in San Rafael, Bulacan. The name of the so-called Bulacan Martyrs was added to the Bantayog ng mga Bayani's 'Wall of Remembrance' in 2012.

The case of the Bulacan Martyrs also demonstrates how the Marcos dictatorship affected local communities, particularly those involved in organizing farmers. The five young activists were arrested in Pulilan in June 1982 while meeting to discuss their organizing efforts and were subsequently found dead in San Rafael. Their deaths prompted church and human rights groups in Bulacan to campaign for justice, showing how opposition to the dictatorship extended beyond major cities and into rural communities.

=== Move of Valenzuela to Metro Manila ===
Through Presidential Decree № 824, Bulacan was partitioned on November 7, 1975, to form the National Capital Region. The municipality of Valenzuela (formerly Polo) was excised to form the new region, while the other 25 towns remained in Bulacan.

==== Issues concerning the foundation date ====
To determine the tentative date of Bulacan's foundation and to trace its roots from colonial period, efforts and research conducted by Jaime Veneracion, Reynaldo Naguit of the Center for Bulacan Studies, and Isagani Giron of the Samahang Pangkasaysayan ng Bulacan (Sampaka) shows that Bulacan was identified as a visita of Tondo in 1578.

With regards to exact date of foundation of Bulacan as a province, Veneracion correlated it with the Spanish practice of dedicating the founding of a pueblo to the feast of a patron saint. In the case of Bulacan it is the Nuestra Señora de la Asuncion, which is also the patron saint of Bulakan town, the first capital of the province. Officially, the province of Bulacan was created under Act 2711 on March 10, 1917.

== Geography ==
Bulacan covers a total area of 2,796.10 square kilometers (1,079.58 sq mi) occupying the southeastern section of the Central Luzon region. The province is bounded by Nueva Ecija (San Isidro, Gapan, General Tinio) on the north, Aurora (Dingalan) on the northeast, Quezon (General Nakar) on the east, Rizal (Rodriguez) on the southeast, Metro Manila (Valenzuela City, Malabon, Navotas, Caloocan and Quezon City) on the south, Manila Bay on the southwest, and Pampanga (Candaba, San Luis, Apalit, Macabebe, Masantol) on the west.

Several rivers irrigate the province of Bulacan; the largest one is that of Angat. Angat River passes through the towns of Norzagaray, Angat, Bustos, San Rafael, Baliwag, Plaridel, Pulilan, and Calumpit. It flows thence into the Pampanga River, goes out again, washes Hagonoy, and loses itself in the mangroves. The banks of these rivers are very fertile and are covered with trees.

=== Terrain ===
Bulacan lies in the southern portion of the fertile plains of Central Luzon. The area is drained by the Angat and Pampanga rivers. The Sierra Madre mountain range forms the highlands of Bulacan in the east and is a protected area known as the Angat Watershed Forest Reserve. Angat Lake, which was formed by the Angat Dam is located in that area. The highest point in the province at 1,206 meters (3,957 ft) is Mount Oriod, part of the Sierra Madre.

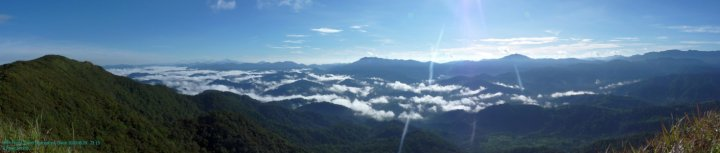
The Sierra Madre Mountain Range as seen near Mount Oriod's summit

=== Climate ===
November to April is generally dry while wet for the rest of the year. The northeast monsoon (amihan) prevails from October to January bringing in moderated and light rains. From February to April, the east trade winds predominate but the Sierra Madre (Philippines) mountain range to the east disrupts the winds resulting to a dry period. From May to September, the southwest monsoon (habagat).

The hottest month is May with an average temperature of 29.7 °C (85.5 °F) while the coldest is February with an average temperature of 25.1 °C (77.2 °F).

Climate data for Bulacan
Month	Jan	Feb	Mar	Apr	May	Jun	Jul	Aug	Sep	Oct	Nov	Dec	Year
Mean daily maximum °C (°F)	30.5 (86.9)	31.5 (88.7)	33.1 (91.6)	34.5 (94.1)	34 (93)	32.6 (90.7)	32 (90)	31.2 (88.2)	31.4 (88.5)	31.6 (88.9)	31.4 (88.5)	30.5 (86.9)	32.0 (89.7)
Mean daily minimum °C (°F)	21.6 (70.9)	21.8 (71.2)	22.9 (73.2)	24.1 (75.4)	25 (77)	25 (77)	24.6 (76.3)	24.8 (76.6)	24.3 (75.7)	24 (75)	23.5 (74.3)	22.3 (72.1)	23.7 (74.6)
Average rainy days	5	3	4	5	13	20	22	22	22	17	15	8	156
Source: Storm247

=== Administrative divisions ===
Bulacan is subdivided into 20 municipalities and 4 cities. As the population is concentrated in the southern half of the province, so are the legislative districts.

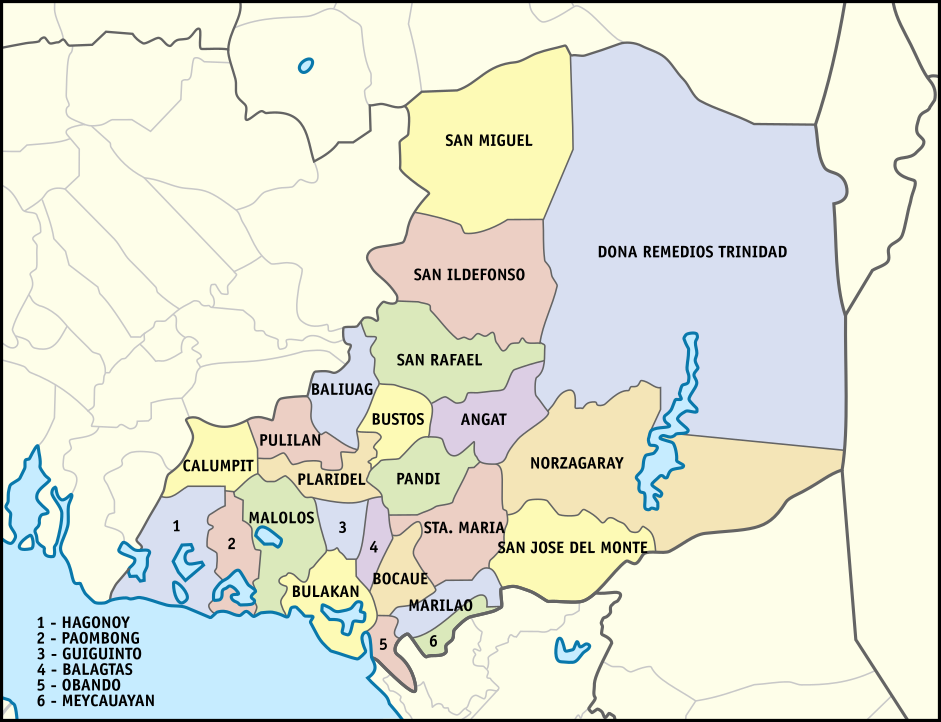
Political divisions

- † Provincial capital and component city
- ∗ Component city
- Municipality

City or municipality		District	Population			±% p.a.	Area		Density		Barangay	Coordinates^{[A]}
			(2020)		(2015)		km^{2}	sq mi	/km^{2}	/sq mi		
Angat		6th	1.8%	65,617	59,237	1.97%	61.59	23.78	1,100	2,800	16	14°55′58″N 121°01′55″E
Balagtas		5th	2.1%	77,018	73,929	0.78%	28.66	11.07	2,700	7,000	9	14°49′11″N 120°54′22″E
Baliwag (Note: Also traditionally spelled as "Baliuag," the name was standardized as "Baliwag" in the cityhood charter, Republic Act No. 11929, which lapsed into law and was subsequently ratified by 75.75% of voters in 2022.)	∗	2nd	4.5%	168,470	149,954	2.24%	45.05	17.39	3,700	9,600	27	14°57′31″N 120°53′49″E
Bocaue		5th	3.8%	141,412	119,675	3.23%	31.87	12.31	4,400	11,000	19	14°47′59″N 120°55′35″E
Bulakan		1st	2.2%	81,232	76,565	1.13%	72.90	28.15	1,100	2,800	14	14°47′39″N 120°52′46″E
Bustos		2nd	2.1%	77,199	67,039	2.72%	69.99	27.02	1,100	2,800	14	14°57′06″N 120°55′08″E
Calumpit		1st	3.2%	118,471	108,757	1.64%	56.25	21.72	2,100	5,400	29	14°54′54″N 120°45′49″E
Doña Remedios Trinidad		3rd	0.8%	28,656	22,663	4.57%	932.96	360.22	31	80	8	14°58′19″N 121°03′48″E
Guiguinto		5th	3.1%	113,415	99,730	2.48%	27.50	10.62	4,100	11,000	14	14°49′41″N 120°52′42″E
Hagonoy		1st	3.6%	133,448	129,807	0.53%	103.10	39.81	1,300	3,400	26	14°50′04″N 120°44′00″E
Malolos	†	Lone District	7.0%	261,189	252,074	0.68%	67.25	25.97	3,900	10,000	51	14°50′26″N 120°48′42″E
Marilao		4th	6.9%	254,453	221,965	2.63%	33.74	13.03	7,500	19,000	16	14°45′26″N 120°56′52″E
Meycauayan	∗	4th	6.1%	225,673	209,083	1.46%	32.10	12.39	7,000	18,000	26	14°44′10″N 120°57′26″E
Norzagaray		6th	3.7%	136,064	111,348	3.89%	309.77	119.60	440	1,100	13	14°54′25″N 121°02′47″E
Obando		4th	1.6%	59,978	59,197	0.25%	52.10	20.12	1,200	3,100	11	14°42′45″N 120°56′06″E
Pandi		5th	4.2%	155,115	89,075	5.56%	31.20	12.05	5,000	13,000	22	14°51′48″N 120°57′21″E
Paombong		1st	1.5%	55,696	53,294	0.84%	46.34	17.89	1,200	3,100	14	14°49′53″N 120°47′15″E
Plaridel		2nd	3.1%	114,432	107,805	1.14%	32.44	12.53	3,500	9,100	19	14°53′06″N 120°51′33″E
Pulilan		1st	2.9%	108,836	97,323	2.15%	39.89	15.40	2,700	7,000	19	14°54′08″N 120°52′03″E
San Ildefonso		3rd	3.1%	115,713	104,471	1.97%	128.71	49.70	900	2,300	36	15°04′41″N 120°56′23″E
San Jose del Monte	∗	SJDM 2 LD	17.6%	651,813	574,089	2.45%	105.53	40.75	6,200	16,000	59	14°48′35″N 121°02′49″E
San Miguel		3rd	4.6%	172,073	153,882	2.15%	231.40	89.34	740	1,900	49	15°08′45″N 120°58′27″E
San Rafael		3rd	2.8%	103,097	94,655	1.64%	152.43	58.85	680	1,800	34	15°01′31″N 120°55′59″E
Santa Maria		6th	7.8%	289,820	256,454	2.36%	90.92	35.10	3,200	8,300	24	14°49′13″N 120°57′38″E
Total				3,708,890	3,292,071	2.30%	2,783.69	1,074.79	1,300	3,400	569	(see GeoGroup box)
1. Coordinates mark the city/town center, and are sortable by latitude.

== Demographics ==
The population of Bulacan in the 2024 census was 3,876,806 people, making it the second most populous province in the country, only behind from Cavite, which is also located in Luzon. It had a density of 1,400 inhabitants per square kilometer or 3,600 inhabitants per square mile, the country's 4th highest for a province.

On May 1, 2010, the province had 2,924,433 inhabitants with an annual population growth rate of 2.73 from the year 2000 to 2010, There were 588,693 households in the province with an average size of 4.8 persons. Bulacan had a median age of 23 years in 2007.

Population census of Bulacan

Year	Pop.	±% p.a.
1903	215,559	—
1918	239,969	+0.72%
1939	319,339	+1.37%
1948	394,642	+2.38%
1960	514,346	+2.23%
1970	737,975	+3.67%

Year	Pop.	±% p.a.
1975	899,529	+4.05%
1980	1,096,046	+4.03%
1990	1,505,219	+3.22%
1995	1,784,441	+3.24%
2000	2,234,088	+4.94%
2007	2,822,216	+3.28%

Year	Pop.	±% p.a.
2010	2,924,433	+1.30%
2015	3,292,071	+2.28%
2020	3,708,890	+2.54%
2024	3,876,806	+1.07%

Source: Philippine Statistics Authority

=== Languages and ethnicities ===
As it is part of the Tagalog cultural sphere (Katagalugan), Tagalog is the predominant language of Bulacan. The Tagalog dialect spoken in Bulacan resembles a poetic form of speech. Some inhabitants also speak Kapampangan, especially in areas close to the border of Pampanga. Bulacan Tagalog itself contains many loanwords of Kapampangan origin. Like as mentioned above, Bulacan was natively Kapampangan when Spaniards arrived, but when British invaded Manila, the province became dominantly Tagalog after many Tagalog refugees from Manila and northern areas of Cavite escaped to Bulacan, where the original Kapampangan settlers welcomed them and assimilated to them. Many place names of Kapampangan origin are evident in the province, like Malolos, Baliwag, Guiguinto, Pandi, Quingwa (former name of Plaridel), & San Miguel de Mayumo. Three municipalities (San Miguel, Doña Remedios Trinidad, and Norzagaray) and one city (San Jose del Monte) are the homelands of the Alta Kabulowan (also known as Dumagat people), the first inhabitants of Bulacan, whose language is also called Alta Kabulowan. Their language is currently endangered due to a present influx of Tagalog speakers. Being bordered by Metro Manila from its south, people from farther provinces settled in Bulacan, resulting in minor but significant usage of non-native languages in the province such as Cebuano, Hiligaynon, Waray, Maranao, Maguindanaon, Tausug, Ilocano, Pangasinan and Bicolano.

San Jose del Monte, Santa Maria, Malolos, Marilao, San Miguel and Norzagaray bear the highest numbers of English speakers in the province.

=== Religion ===
==== Catholicism ====
Roman Catholic (89.44%) is the predominant religion in the province. Malolos City is the seat of the Roman Catholic Diocese of Malolos, with its mother church, the Minor Basilica and Cathedral of the Immaculate Conception. On March 21, 2021, Sta. Maria Church was also granted the status of Minor Basilica by Pope Francis. It became Bulacan's second Minor Basilica and the 18th in the Philippines.

==== Islam ====
Here, most Muslims are converts, especially from Roman Catholicism, who are called Balik Islam. In mid-2015, nearly a hundred people from a village in Hagonoy municipality declared their conversion to Islam. They were guided by Ustadz Mohammed Yousef Pamintuan, from an Balik Islam organization there.

==== Others ====
Other Christian groups include the second largest religion Iglesia ni Cristo (4.01%),MCGI, Evangelicals (1.53%), Jehovah's Witnesses (0.37%), Bible Baptist Church (0.30%), Muslims (0.21%), Seventh-day Adventists (0.21%), and Aglipayans (0.17%), and other small numbers of Christians and non-Christian groups are also present.

== Economy ==
Poverty incidence of Bulacan (%)

Source: Philippine Statistics Authority

=== Industries ===
The province of Bulacan is steadily becoming industrialized due to its proximity to Metro Manila. Many corporations put up industrial plants and site in Bulacan. Some of the businesses and industries include agribusiness; aquaculture; banking; business process outsourcing; cement bag making; ceramics; construction; courier; electronics; education; food/food processing; furniture; garments; gifts, houseware & decors; home appliance assembly; hospitals; hotels, resorts and restaurants; information and communications technology; insurance; jewelry; leather and leather tanning; manpower; marble; pharmaceutical manufacturing; printing press; pyrotechnics and fireworks manufacturing; realty/real property development; school & office supply manufacturing; shoe manufacturing; textile; trade; transport services; travel and tours.

=== Agribusiness and aquaculture ===
The rural areas still mostly depend on agriculture and aquaculture as a source of income. Some of the major crops are rice, maize, vegetables, and fruits such as mangoes. An orchid farm is operating at Golden Bloom Orchids at Barangay Maguinao in San Rafael, Bulacan. The fisheries of Bulacan, aside from fishponds and rivers, include Bustos Dam and waterlogged areas. Major species cultured include bangus, tilapia, prawn, and catfish. This made Bulacan a leading province in bangus production based on reports of the Bureau of Agricultural Statistics (BAS).

=== Banking and finance ===
Bulacan is served by all major banks with more than 200 banks doing business in the province. The entrepreneurial culture is supported by the strong cooperative movement with total assets of over ₱2 billion.

=== Industrial estate and parks ===
This is a partial list of industrial sites in the province:

- First Bulacan Industrial City—Malolos City
- Intercity Industrial Estate—Wakas, Bocaue
- Bulacan Agro-Industrial Subdivision—Calumpit
- Bulacan Metro Warehouse (BMW) Center—Guiguinto
- Horizon IT Park—San Jose del Monte
- Meycauayan Industrial Subd. I, II, III & IV—Meycauayan
- Meridian Industrial Compound—Meycauayan
- Muralla Industrial Project—Meycauayan
- First Valenzuela Industrial Compound—Meycauayan
- Sterling Industrial Park Phase I, II, III & IV—Meycauayan
- Grand Industrial Estate—Plaridel
- Sapang Palay Industrial Estates—San Jose del Monte
- Agus Development Corporation—Santa María
- Bulacan ICT Park—Marilao
- Golden City Business Park—Wakas, Bocaue
- Sterling Industrial Park—Marilao

=== Income ===
Bulacan received the top place for "LGU's with Highest Gross Income" (₱1,717,600,000.00) and "Top Spender by LGU's" (₱1,349,420,000.00), and third (3rd) among the "Top Provinces with Generated Biggest Net Income" (₱368,180,000.00) according to the 2006 Annual Financial Report - Local Governments of the Commission on Audit. The first time to top the perennial top placer, which was the Province of Cebu.

The province received the top place for "LGU's with Highest Gross Income" (₱1,807,600,000.00), second (2nd) in "Top Spender by LGU's" (₱1,372,160,000.00), and third (3rd) among the "Top Provinces with Generated Biggest Net Income" (₱434,830,000.00) according to the 2007 Annual Financial Report - Local Governments of the Commission on Audit.

Based on the Commission on Audit's 2008 Annual Financial Report for Local Governments, the province's total gross income had increased to ₱1,965,633,000.00 (including the subsidies and extra items). Its expenses had also increased to ₱1,641,325,000.00, which brings a total net income of ₱324,308,000.00.

This is the list of the top income earners in Bulacan from 2014 and 2017:

Total Annual Income

Rank	Cities	Total Income year 2014	Total Income year 2017
1	San Jose del Monte City	P913,235,378.58	P1,656,795,493.51
2	Meycauayan City	P1,040,417,057.25	P1,261,753,000.00
3	Malolos City	P728,233,425.91	P1,073,664,634.88

Rank	Municipalities	Total Income year 2014	Total Income year 2017
1	Marilao	P492,923,864.65	P691,361,404.62
2	Santa Maria	P469,519,504.09	P666,262,372.88
3	Baliwag	P355,134,474.37	P491,540,000.00
4	Norzagaray	P339,826,359.28	P457,591,188.80
5	Guiguinto	P287,155,107.85	P399,459,000.00
6	Pulilan	P254,593,126.17	P383,603,000.00
7	San Ildefonso	P226,765,458.99	P371,289,000.00
8	San Miguel	P235,223,130.45	P347,990,000.00
9	Bocaue	P231,525,019.23	P336,319,000.00
10	Plaridel	P218,805,468.98	P313,338,000.00
11	San Rafael	P178,775,463.41	P274,630,000.00
12	Hagonoy	P203,642,317.97	P274,586,000.00
13	Calumpit	P200,183,699.45	P273,760,000.00
14	Balagtas	P181,458,744.82	P249,167,000.00
15	Pandi	P123,422,786.80	P208,845,000.00
16	Doña Remedios Trinidad	P149,367,450.83	P206,990,000.00
17	Bulakan	P128,183,549.07	P177,234,438.12
18	Angat	P123,431,253.48	P170,725,000.00
19	Bustos	P117,241,848.39	P167,142,535.59
20	Obando	P107,619,189.23	P145,157,000.00
21	Paombong	P90,292,081.91	P123,699,191.88

=== Local Products ===
"Tatak Bulakenyo Program" was launched in 2004, conceptualized to stimulate economic activity in the province and sustain the anti-poverty thrust of the government through the promotion of entrepreneurship. The program's beneficiaries are potential micro, small and medium-sized enterprises in the province.

Tatak Bulakenyo Products comprises sabutan bags, buntal hats, beverages, and even jams such as tomato jam.

== Government ==
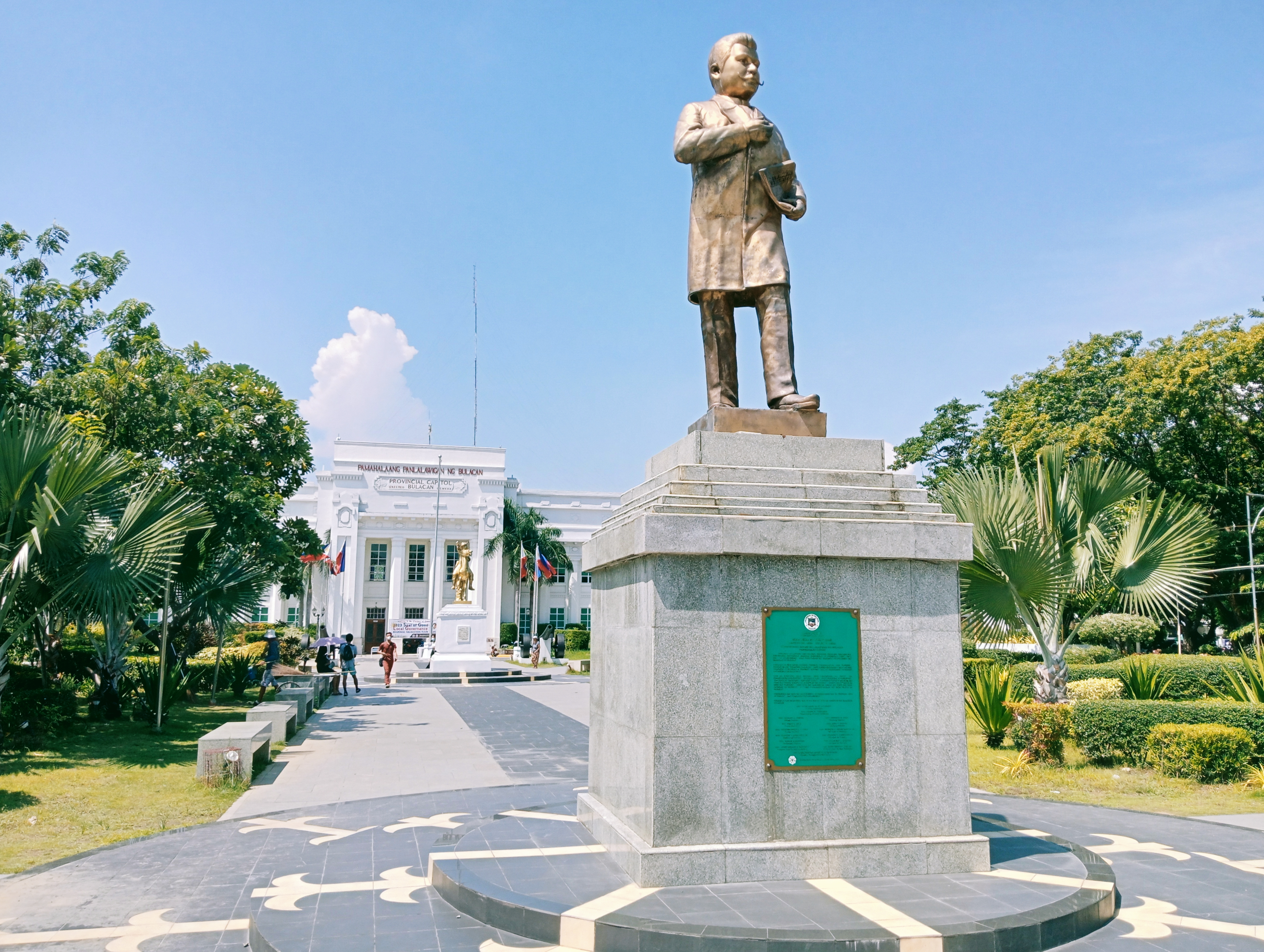
Marcelo H. del Pilar monument overviewing the Bulacan Provincial Capitol building

Current provincial government officials (2025-2028):

- Governor: Daniel R. Fernando (NUP)
- Vice-Governor: Alexis C. Castro (NUP)

Sangguniang Panlalawigan Members

1st District

- Michael M. Aquino (NUP)
- Romina D. Fermin (Independent)

2nd District

- Atty. Erlene Luz V. Dela Cruz (NUP)
- Lee Edward V. Nicolas (NUP)

3rd District

- Romeo V. Castro Jr. (NUP)
- Raul A. Mariano (NUP)

4th District

- Anna Kathrina M. Hernandez (PFP)
- William R. Villarica (PFP)

5th District

- Richard A. Roque (NUP)
- Cezar L. Mendoza (NUP)

6th District

- Renato D. De Guzman Jr. (Lakas)
- Arthur A. Legaspi (Lakas)

Lone District of City of San Jose del Monte

- Enrique A. Delos Santos Jr. (NUP)
- Efren C. Bartolome (NUP)

Ex-Officio Members

- Fortunato Angeles (President, Liga ng mga Barangay)
- Josef Andrew Mendoza (President, PCL)
- Casey Tyrone Howard (President, Panlalawigang Pederasyon ng Sangguniang Kabataan)
- Liberato Sembrano (Representative, IPMR)

== House of Representatives ==
District	Representative	Party	Term	Bloc
1st	Danilo D. Domingo	NUP	2	Majority
2nd	Augustina Dominique C. Pancho	NUP	2	Majority
3rd	Mark Cholo I. Violago	PFP	1	Majority
4th	Linabelle Ruth R. Villarica	PFP	2	Majority
5th	Agatha Paula A. Cruz	PFP	1	Majority
6th	Salvador A. Pleyto	PFP	2	Majority
Lone, CSJDM	Arturo B. Robes	Lakas	1	Majority

== Transportation ==
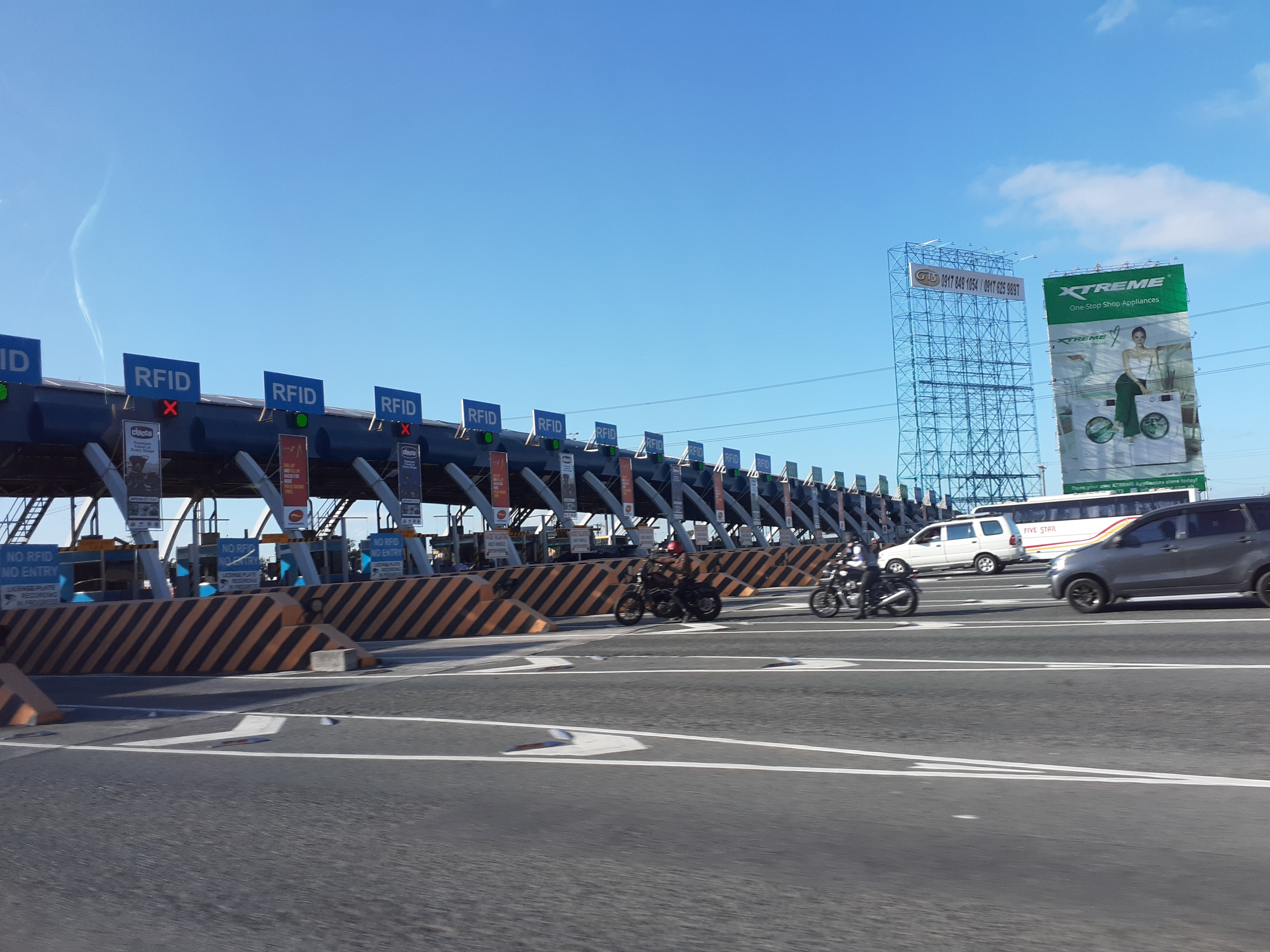
Bocaue Toll Plaza of the North Luzon Expressway

Bulacan is dubbed as "The Gateway to the Northern Philippines". The province is linked with Metro Manila primarily through the North Luzon Expressway and Manila North Road (better known as the MacArthur Highway) which crosses the province into Pampanga and western part of Northern Luzon (western Central Luzon, Ilocos and Cordillera Administrative Region). While taking the Cagayan Valley Road in Guiguinto, the road leads to Nueva Ecija and to the eastern part of Northern Luzon (eastern Central Luzon and Cagayan Valley Region). Bulacan will be accessed by the future C-6 Road connecting the provinces of Rizal and Cavite and the cities of Taguig, Parañaque and Muntinlupa in Metro Manila.

The proposed North Luzon East Expressway (NLEE) is the future expressway link between Metro Manila and the provinces of Bulacan and Nueva Ecija. It will also serve as a new alternate route of motorists coming from Manila going to Aurora and Cagayan Valley region.

The MacArthur Highway traverses the province from north to south. Most major towns can be reached through the North Luzon Expressway. A good number of motor vehicles owned largely by private individuals provide mobility to Bulacan's populace. Aside from five main highways that traverse the province, all roads are widely dispersed throughout Bulacan.

Bus terminals of Baliwag Transit Inc., Golden Bee Transport and Logistics Corp., California Bus Line, Sampaguita Liner, and Royal Eagle are in Baliwag, Balagtas and Hagonoy. The main bus lines of Philippine Rabbit, Victory Liner, Aladdin Transit that originates from their main terminals in Manila, Pasay and Quezon City and travels northward to cities and towns in Pampanga, Tarlac, and Zambales, pass through Bulacan via the Tabang exit. Other bus companies that travel to Bulacan include ES Transport Corp. (Earth Star Transportation), Baliwag Transit, First North Luzon, Five Star, Agila Bus Transport, Sta Monica Transport Corp TSC, NSDC Buenasher Lines (Del Carmen), Shannen And Pauline Bus Co., Phil. Corinthian, Marsan, Mayamy, RJ Express. Bulacan is the home of its pride, one of the biggest bus lines in Luzon, the Baliwag Transit Inc. which headquarters in Baliwag, Bulacan hence it's named.

Public transportation within the province, like in most of the urban areas in the Philippines, is facilitated mostly using inexpensive jeepneys and buses. Tricycles are used for short distances.

A construction of Philippine National Railways (PNR) North-South Commuter Railway (NSCR) system is on track, and officials say the remnants of old PNR stations built in Bulacan province in 1892 will be preserved. The ruins of the station in Guiguinto town, Bulacan province, will be among the structures that will be preserved. The structures in the city and in the towns of Balagtas, Guiguinto, Malolos, and Calumpit would also be renovated to complement the design of the new railway stations.

Junn Magno, PNR general manager, said 10 structures left standing from the old stations would be restored to give a glimpse of the PNR's history.

The San Miguel Corporation's proposed Bulacan Airport, dubbed as New Manila International Airport, involves the construction of a brand-new international airport and is being positioned as an alternative to the congested NAIA in Manila. It has also been seen that the four million tourists that visit the country yearly will be tripled once the airport project proposal pushes through.

== Education ==
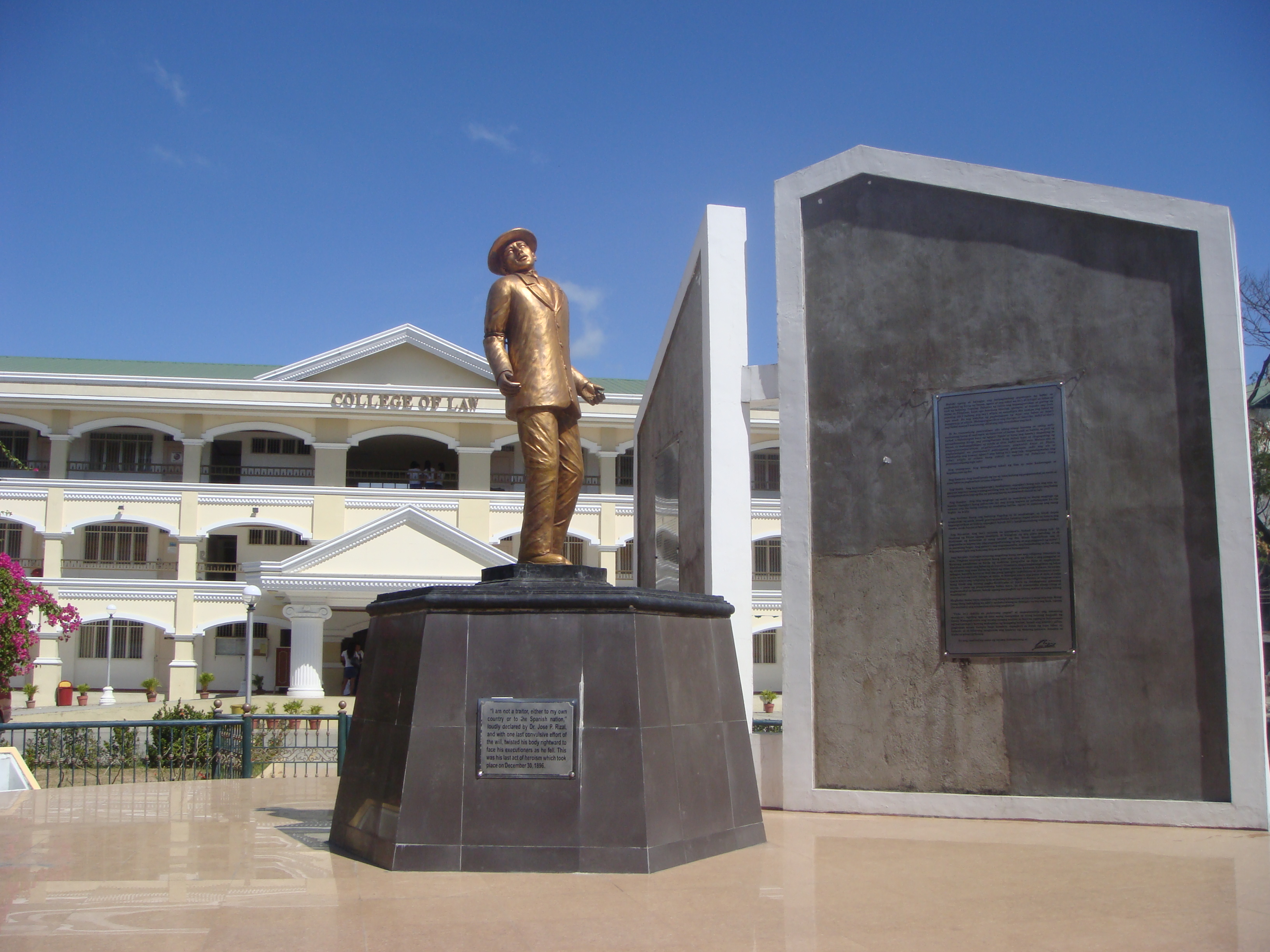
College of Law (Bulacan State University)

The province is home to several nationally recognized public and private educational institutions such as Baliuag University (First school granted full autonomy in Region 3), the Bulacan State University (Main & Satellite Campuses), the Bulacan Polytechnic College (Malolos, Bocaue, Pandi, Angat, San Miguel, San Rafael, Obando & City of San Jose del Monte Campus), Bulacan Agricultural State College (San Ildefonso & DRT Campus), Polytechnic University of the Philippines (Santa Maria Extension Campus and Pulilan Campus), La Consolacion University Philippines and Centro Escolar University (Malolos Campus). On the other hand, National University, a non-sectarian Manila-based university, has established its first campus outside Metro Manila in the city of Baliwag, and Baliuag Polytechnic College, a public non-sectarian institution in the city of Baliwag.

Emille Joson's Bulacan Tourism Commercial:

In 2010, Internationally Acclaimed Filmmaker Emille Joson, a proud Bulekanya, selected Bulacan as the backdrop for tourism project at Colegio De San Juan De Letran Manila, showcasing her niece Daniela Barlan, along with the Bulacan Culture and injected some fairy tale style. The promotional campaign became a viral and winning admirations of many Bulakenyos, including prominent politicians.

=== Primary and intermediate ===
There are currently four schools divisions under the Department of Education:

- Bulacan (Province)
- City of Malolos
- City of San Jose del Monte
- City of Meycauayan

Bulacan has 475 public Elementary schools: 383 under the Department of Education (DepEd) Schools Division of Bulacan, 52 under the Division of City Schools of San Jose del Monte, and 38 under the Division of City Schools of Malolos.

=== Secondary ===
Bulacan has 68 public high schools, national and provincial: 43 under the Department of Education (DepEd) Schools Division of Bulacan, 18 under the Division of City Schools of San Jose del Monte, 3 under the Division of City Schools of Malolos, and 4 under the Division of City Schools of Meycauayan.

=== Private schools ===
There are numerous privately owned (by individual or group) and church-operated schools located in the province.

The Immaculate Conception School for Boys and the Immaculate Conception School of Malolos are both under the Diocese of Malolos, with the incumbent Bishop of Malolos as president. Also under the Diocese is the Immaculate Conception Seminary. Others are under the direction of religious orders and congregations such as the La Consolacion University Philippines (Augustinian Sisters of Our Lady of Consolation), St. Paul College of Bocaue and St. Paul University at San Miguel (Congregation of the Sisters of St. Paul of Chartres) and the Holy Spirit Academy of Malolos (Sister Servants of the Holy Spirit). The Immaculate Heart of Mary School was established in 1992 with student enrollment less than 200 (as of 2016–17). The Colegio de San Pascual Baylon (formerly St. Pascual Institution) which is established in 1913 and currently managed by the Dominican Sisters of St. Joseph.

There are also schools under other denominations such as the Bulacan Ecumenical School and Bulacan Ecumenical Kindergarten (United Methodist Church).

Private schools in the province are members of the Bulacan Private Schools Association (BULPRISA) While in the City of San Jose del Monte private schools are organized by City of San Jose del Monte Private Schools Association (CSanPRISA). In Malolos, private schools are organized as Malolos City Private Schools Association (MACIPRISA). In Meycauayan, private schools are organized as Meycauayan City Private Schools Association (MEYCIPRISA). In Marilao, private schools are organized as Association of Private Schools in Marilao (APRISM).

=== Bulacan University and Collegiate Athletic Association ===
On April 15, 2024, Daniel Fernando, Chairman of Bulacan University and Collegiate Athletic Association (BUCAA) with Alex Castro led the opening ceremony of the Basketball tournament, with 32 competing teams and the Cheerdance competition at the Baliwag Star Arena. Joko Diaz with Mark Herras and Gab Lagman played basketball as All star goodwill tour visitors in the exhibition game.

== See also ==
- List of radio stations in Bulacan
- Roman Catholic Diocese of Malolos
- Malolos Cathedral
