= Chamberlain, South Dakota =

Chamberlain Makȟáthipi (Lakota)
- City
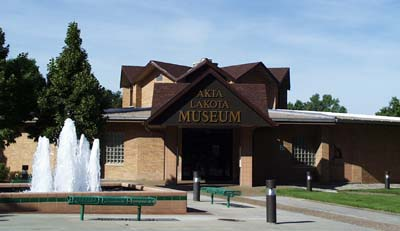
- Akta Lakota Museum, 2003
- Motto: "One day just isn't enough..."
- Location in Brule County and the state of South Dakota
- Coordinates: 43°48′20″N 99°19′42″W
- Country: United States
- State: South Dakota
- County: Brule
- Founded: 1881

Government
  - Mayor: Monte Claussen

Area
  - Total: 5.68 sq mi (14.70 km^{2})
  - Land: 4.48 sq mi (11.60 km^{2})
  - Water: 1.20 sq mi (3.10 km^{2})
- Elevation: 1,404 ft (428 m)

Population (2020)
  - Total: 2,473
  - Density: 552.1/sq mi (213.16/km^{2})
- Time zone: UTC−6 (Central (CST))
  - Summer (DST): UTC−5 (CDT)
- ZIP codes: 57325-57326
- Area code: 605
- FIPS code: 46-11220
- GNIS feature ID: 1265153
- Website: www.cityofchamberlain.com

Chamberlain is a city in Brule County, South Dakota, United States. It is located on the east bank of the Missouri River, at the dammed section of the Lake Francis Case, close to where it is crossed by Interstate 90.

The population of Chamberlain was 2,473 at the 2020 census. It is the county seat of Brule County.

Chamberlain is home to the South Dakota Hall of Fame, and the 50-foot tall Dignity statue is nearby.

== History ==
Chamberlain was named after Selah Chamberlain, a railroad director of the Chicago, Milwaukee and St. Paul Railway, as it was established by European Americans in relation to the construction of the railroad. The city is called "earth dwelling" in Lakota.

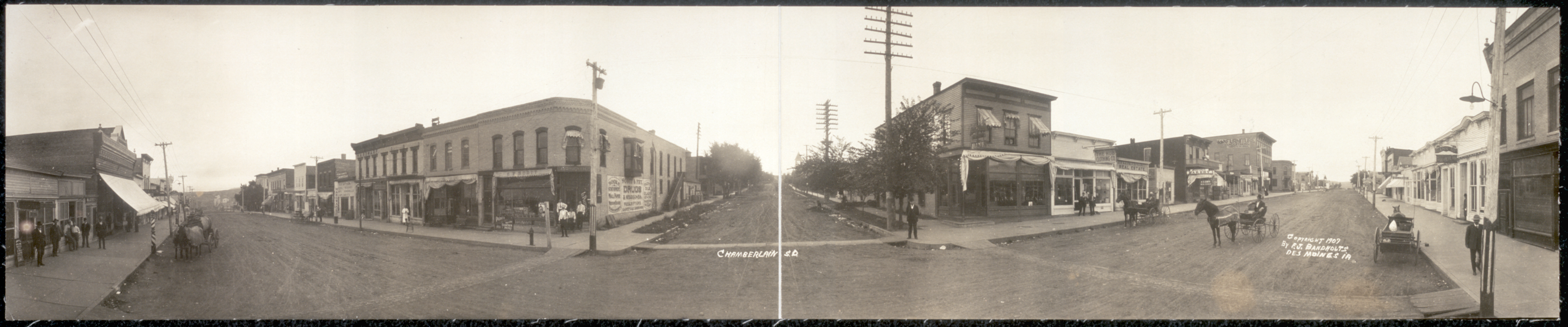
Chamberlain, 1907

== Geography ==
According to the United States Census Bureau, the city has a total area of 7.84 square miles (20.31 km^{2}), of which 6.64 square miles (17.20 km^{2}) is land and 1.20 square miles (3.11 km^{2}) is water.

=== Climate ===
Climate data for Chamberlain 5 S, South Dakota (1991−2020 normals, extremes 1980−present)
Month	Jan	Feb	Mar	Apr	May	Jun	Jul	Aug	Sep	Oct	Nov	Dec	Year
Record high °F (°C)	68 (20)	75 (24)	88 (31)	93 (34)	100 (38)	111 (44)	113 (45)	112 (44)	105 (41)	98 (37)	87 (31)	73 (23)	113 (45)
Mean maximum °F (°C)	53.1 (11.7)	59.8 (15.4)	74.2 (23.4)	82.9 (28.3)	90.2 (32.3)	95.0 (35.0)	102.1 (38.9)	99.7 (37.6)	95.4 (35.2)	86.2 (30.1)	71.6 (22.0)	56.4 (13.6)	103.5 (39.7)
Mean daily maximum °F (°C)	29.0 (−1.7)	33.8 (1.0)	45.4 (7.4)	57.4 (14.1)	69.0 (20.6)	79.6 (26.4)	87.0 (30.6)	85.2 (29.6)	76.9 (24.9)	61.7 (16.5)	45.9 (7.7)	32.7 (0.4)	58.6 (14.8)
Daily mean °F (°C)	19.0 (−7.2)	23.1 (−4.9)	33.9 (1.1)	45.1 (7.3)	56.9 (13.8)	67.7 (19.8)	74.2 (23.4)	72.2 (22.3)	63.4 (17.4)	49.0 (9.4)	34.6 (1.4)	23.0 (−5.0)	46.8 (8.2)
Mean daily minimum °F (°C)	9.0 (−12.8)	12.3 (−10.9)	22.3 (−5.4)	32.9 (0.5)	44.8 (7.1)	55.9 (13.3)	61.5 (16.4)	59.3 (15.2)	49.9 (9.9)	36.2 (2.3)	23.3 (−4.8)	13.2 (−10.4)	35.0 (1.7)
Mean minimum °F (°C)	−13.0 (−25.0)	−8.5 (−22.5)	1.8 (−16.8)	18.6 (−7.4)	31.6 (−0.2)	44.2 (6.8)	51.0 (10.6)	49.1 (9.5)	35.1 (1.7)	19.9 (−6.7)	5.3 (−14.8)	−7.6 (−22.0)	−17.7 (−27.6)
Record low °F (°C)	−30 (−34)	−34 (−37)	−19 (−28)	1 (−17)	24 (−4)	32 (0)	46 (8)	39 (4)	24 (−4)	4 (−16)	−13 (−25)	−30 (−34)	−34 (−37)
Average precipitation inches (mm)	0.54 (14)	0.60 (15)	1.08 (27)	2.65 (67)	3.51 (89)	4.27 (108)	2.82 (72)	3.02 (77)	2.28 (58)	1.97 (50)	0.81 (21)	0.53 (13)	24.08 (612)
Average snowfall inches (cm)	7.3 (19)	8.0 (20)	7.2 (18)	6.8 (17)	0.0 (0.0)	0.0 (0.0)	0.0 (0.0)	0.0 (0.0)	0.0 (0.0)	1.4 (3.6)	5.1 (13)	7.5 (19)	43.3 (110)
Average precipitation days (≥ 0.01 in)	5.8	5.9	6.2	9.5	11.2	11.4	8.8	8.3	7.3	7.4	5.4	6.0	93.2
Average snowy days (≥ 0.1 in)	4.4	4.3	3.8	2.0	0.0	0.0	0.0	0.0	0.0	0.6	2.8	4.7	22.6
Source: NOAA

== Demographics ==
Historical population
Census	Pop.	Note	%±
1890	939		—
1900	874		−6.9%
1910	1,275		45.9%
1920	1,303		2.2%
1930	1,364		4.7%
1940	1,626		19.2%
1950	1,912		17.6%
1960	2,598		35.9%
1970	2,626		1.1%
1980	2,258		−14.0%
1990	2,347		3.9%
2000	2,338		−0.4%
2010	2,387		2.1%
2020	2,473		3.6%
U.S. Decennial Census

=== 2020 census ===
As of the 2020 census, Chamberlain had a population of 2,473 and a median age of 43.0 years; 22.6% of residents were under the age of 18 and 23.0% were 65 years of age or older. For every 100 females there were 88.5 males, and for every 100 females age 18 and over there were 86.6 males age 18 and over.

0.0% of residents lived in urban areas, while 100.0% lived in rural areas.

There were 1,011 households in Chamberlain, of which 28.3% had children under the age of 18 living in them. Of all households, 39.7% were married-couple households, 19.8% were households with a male householder and no spouse or partner present, and 33.3% were households with a female householder and no spouse or partner present. About 36.5% of all households were made up of individuals and 15.6% had someone living alone who was 65 years of age or older.

There were 1,169 housing units, of which 13.5% were vacant. The homeowner vacancy rate was 1.2% and the rental vacancy rate was 9.4%.

Racial composition as of the 2020 census
Race	Number	Percent
White	1,803	72.9%
Black or African American	31	1.3%
American Indian and Alaska Native	426	17.2%
Asian	25	1.0%
Native Hawaiian and Other Pacific Islander	2	0.1%
Some other race	16	0.6%
Two or more races	170	6.9%
Hispanic or Latino (of any race)	78	3.2%

=== 2010 census ===
As of the census of 2010, there were 2,386 people, 1,040 households, and 588 families living in the city. The population density was 359.5 inhabitants per square mile (138.8/km^{2}). There were 1,142 housing units at an average density of 172.0 per square mile (66.4/km^{2}). The racial makeup of the city was 81.9% White, 0.3% African American, 14.8% Native American, 0.2% Asian, 0.1% from other races, and 2.8% from two or more races. Hispanic or Latino of any race were 1.5% of the population.

There were 1,040 households, of which 28.3% had children under the age of 18 living with them, 41.9% were married couples living together, 12.9% had a female householder with no husband present, 2.7% had a male householder with no wife present, and 43.4% were non-families. 36.9% of all households were made up of individuals, and 15% had someone living alone who was 65 years of age or older. The average household size was 2.17 and the average family size was 2.87.

The median age in the city was 41.8 years. 24.1% of residents were under the age of 18; 6.9% were between the ages of 18 and 24; 22.7% were from 25 to 44; 28.7% were from 45 to 64; and 17.6% were 65 years of age or older. The gender makeup of the city was 45.7% male and 54.3% female.

=== 2000 census ===
As of the census of 2000, there were 2,338 people, 942 households, and 550 families living in the city. The population density was 360.8 inhabitants per square mile (139.3/km^{2}). There were 1,044 housing units at an average density of 161.1 per square mile (62.2/km^{2}). The racial makeup of the city was 86.83% White, 0.60% African American, 10.18% Native American, 0.38% Asian, 0.04% Pacific Islander, 0.13% from other races, and 1.84% from two or more races. Hispanic or Latino of any race were 0.68% of the population.

There were 942 households, out of which 29.0% had children under the age of 18 living with them, 45.3% were married couples living together, 10.0% had a female householder with no husband present, and 41.6% were non-families. 36.2% of all households were made up of individuals, and 15.2% had someone living alone who was 65 years of age or older. The average household size was 2.27 and the average family size was 3.01.

In the city the population was spread out, with 26.9% under the age of 18, 6.8% from 18 to 24, 27.2% from 25 to 44, 21.5% from 45 to 64, and 17.5% who were 65 years of age or older. The median age was 38 years. For every 100 females, there were 86.0 males. For every 100 females age 18 and over, there were 82.6 males.

As of 2000, the median income for a household in the city was $34,487, and the median income for a family was $43,500. Males had a median income of $29,545 versus $22,009 for females. The per capita income for the city was $17,018. About 4.4% of families and 12.0% of the population were below the poverty line, including 3.9% of those under age 18 and 25.9% of those age 65 or over.

== Economy ==
- Chamberlain Manganese Deposits

== Education ==
It is located in the Chamberlain School District.

St. Joseph's Indian School is located just outside the city.

== Infrastructure ==
=== Transportation ===
Chamberlain is served by the Chamberlain Municipal Airport, as well as the following three highways:

- I-90 (Interstate 90)
- I-90 BL (Interstate 90 Business Loop)
- SD 50 (South Dakota Highway 50)

== See also ==
- List of cities in South Dakota
