= Pandi =

Pandi may refer to:

- Pandi, Bulacan, Philippines
- Pandi, Cundinamarca, Colombia
- Pandi (film), a 2008 Indian Tamil-language film
- Pandi (legendary creature), a creature of medieval bestiary
- Pandi (mascot), a symbol of the 2018 Summer Youth Olympics
- Pandi Melam, an Indian classical percussion concert or ensemble
- PANDI, sponsor for the Indonesian internet country code .id

== People ==
- Pandi (actor), Indian actor
- Pandi Geço (1913–1994), Albanian geographer
- Pandi Gëllçi, Albanian volleyball coach
- Pandi Laço (born 1964), Albanian journalist, songwriter, presenter and scenarist
- Pandi Lestaluhu (born 1997), Indonesian association footballer
- Pandi Raidhi (1931–1999), Albanian actor

== See also ==
- Pandey, a surname
- Pandy
