= Pandey (disambiguation) =

Pandey is a North Indian and Nepalese surname.

Pandey may also refer to:

- Pande family, Nepalese political aristocratic dynasty
- Pandey Aur Pandey, an Indian television series
- Pandeyganj metro station, Lucknow, Uttar Pradesh, India
- Mangal Pandey: The Rising, a 2005 Indian film
- Laxman Pandey, a fictional character portrayed by Atul Kulkarni in the 2006 Indian film Rang De Basanti

== See also ==
- Panday (disambiguation)
- Pandi (disambiguation)
