= Padanaram (disambiguation) =

Padanaram is a village in Massachusetts, United States.

Padanaram may also refer to:

- Padanaram, Indiana, an intentional community in Indiana, United States
- Padan-aram or Paddan Aram, the part of Aram that lay in the Euphrates River valley in the Bible
- Padanaram, Angus, a location in Scotland, U.K.

== See also ==
- Paadasaram, a 1978 Indian Malayalam-language film
