= Pandey =

Pandey, Pande, Panday or Pandya or pandaya-palaiya(Hindi) (Nepali) is primarily a Hindu Brahmin surname commonly found in India and Nepal. The term is used to refer to an individual with specialized knowledge in any of the domains of Hinduism, particularly the Vedas. In Hindi, in addition to being a surname, pāṇḍe is used to denote Pandit or expert and derived from the Sanskrit term Pandita.

== Notable people ==
- Aditya Pande, (born 1976) Indian contemporary artist
- Alok Pandey (born 1989), Indian actor
- Ananya Panday (born 1998), Indian actress
- Arjan Pandey (born 1994), Nepali singer
- Basdeo Panday (1933–2024), 5th Prime Minister of Trinidad and Tobago from 1995 to 2001
- B. D. Pande (1917–2009), former governor of Punjab and West Bengal
- Bhim Bahadur Pande (1915–1992), Nepalese aristocrat, diplomat and historian, awarded title of Sardar
- Brij Bihari Pandey, Indian political leader
- Chhavi Pandey (born 1994), Indian actress and anchor
- Chittu Pandey (1865–1946), Freedom fighter from Baliya
- Chunky Panday (born 1962), Bollywood film star
- Dalbhanjan Pande (died 1846), Nepalese politician, military officer and senior minister from Gora Pande clan
- Damodar Pande (1752–1804), Mulkaji (Prime Minister) of Kingdom of Nepal; Son of Kaji Kalu Pande
- Ganesh Pandey, first Kaji of Gorkha Kingdom
- Ghanshyam Pande (1781–1830), religious leader, commonly known as Swaminarayan; believed to be a deity by followers
- Govind Chandra Pande (1923–2011), Indianhistorian
- Gyanendra Pandey (cricketer) (born 1972), Indian cricketer
- Kabinga Pande (born 1952), Minister of Foreign Affairs, Zambia
- Kalu Pande (born Vamshidhar Pande, 1713–1713); Kaji of Gorkha Kingdom, one of the Nepalese military leaders of Unification of Nepal, leader of aristocratic Pande family of Nepal
- Kedar Pandey (1920–1982), politician, Chief Minister of Bihar
- Kedar Nath Pandey (1943–2022), Indian politician and leader of Communist Party of India
- Rahul Sankrityayan (Kedarnath Pandey, 1893–1963), polyglot writer, Padma Bhushan, Sahitya Academy Award winner
- Mahendra Bahadur Pandey (born 1948), Nepali politician
- Mangal Pandey (died 1857), Indian soldier who played a key part in the events immediately preceding the outbreak of the Great Rebellion of 1857
- Manish Pandey (born 1989), Indian cricketer
- Manish Raj Pandey (born 1970), Nepalese cricketer
- Manoj Kumar Pandey (1975–1999), Indian Army officer from 11th Gorkha Rifles; winner of Param Vir Chakra, India's highest bravery award
- Mike Pandey, Indian wildlife film maker
- Mrinal Pande (born 1946), Indian journalist, editor, columnist
- Neeraj Pandey (born 1973), Bollywood film director, writer & producer
- Nirmal Pandey (1962–2010), Bollywood actor from Nainital in Uttarakhand
- Nitesh Pandey (born 1973), Indian TV/films actor
- Pandey Ganpat Rai (1809–1858), Indian revolutionary, rebel leader and zamindar
- Piyush Pandey, advertising executive, Mumbai, India
- Poonam Pandey (born 1991), Bollywood actor, Mumbai, India
- Pradeep Pandey, Indian film actor
- Prem Chand Pandey (born 1945), scientist and founder director, NCAOR-Indian Antarctic Program
- Prithvi Bahadur Pande, Chairman of Nepal Investment Mega Bank Limited
- Rahul Pandey, Indian playback singer
- Raj Mangal Pande (1920–1993), politician, former Central HRD Cabinet Minister, Government of India
- Rajkumar R. Pandey (born 1972), Indian film director, producer, music composer and screenwriter
- Rana Jang Pande (1789–1843) (Mukhtiyar), Prime Minister of Nepal, Son of Kaji Damodar Pande
- Ranajit Pande, Nepalese Mulkaji from aristocratic Pande family
- Rangaraj Pandey (born 1975), Tamil journalist, political analyst, actor, TV anchor
- Rati Pandey (born 1982), Indian actress and anchor
- Ravish Kumar (full name Ravish Kumar Pandey, born 1974), Journalist at NDTV
- Ritesh Pandey (born 1981), Indian politician
- Ritesh Pandey (singer) (born 1991), Indian singer
- Rohini Pande, American economist
- Sandeep Pandey (born 1965), Indian social activist
- Santosh Pandey (Uttar Pradesh politician) (born 1975)
- Santosh Pandey (Chhattisgarh politician) (born 1967)
- Saroj Pandey (born 1968), Indian politician and member of the Bharatiya Janata Party
- Shikha Pandey (born 1989), Indian female cricketer
- Sudip Pandey (died 2025), Indian film actor and producer
- Sunil Pandey, Indian politician
- Surendra Pandey (born 1958), Nepali politician
- Tansen (Ramtanu Pandey), one of navratnas of Akbar and scholar of ragas and India's great musician
- Tarkeshwar Pandey (1910–1989), former Indian Member of Parliament
- V. C. Pande (1932–2005), former Cabinet Secretary and former governor, Bihar and Arunachal Pradesh
- Vamsharaj Pande (1739–1785), Dewan (Prime Minister) of Kingdom of Nepal
- Vijay Kumar Pandey, Nepali media personality
- Vijay S. Pande (born 1970), Trinidadian–American protein biochemist
- Vinod Pande, Indian film maker and author
- Members of Pande family

== See also ==
- Brahmin communities
- Deshpande
- Panday (disambiguation)
- Pandi (disambiguation)

== Books ==
- Pradhan, Kumar L. (2012). Thapa Politics in Nepal: With Special Reference to Bhim Sen Thapa, 1806–1839. New Delhi: Concept Publishing Company. ISBN 9788180698132.
- Regmi, Mahesh Chandra (1995), Kings and political leaders of the Gorkhali Empire, 1768–1814, Orient Longman, p. 83, ISBN 9788125005117
- Pradhan, Kumar L. (2001). Brian Hodgson at the Kathmandu residency, 1825–1843. Spectrum Publications. ISBN 9788187502159.
- Joshi, Bhuwan Lal; Rose, Leo E. (1966), Democratic Innovations in Nepal: A Case Study of Political Acculturation, University of California Press
