= Pandeism (disambiguation) =

Pandeism is a religious construct incorporating elements of pantheism and deism.

Pandeism may also refer to:

- Pandeism (Godfrey Higgins), a secret cult hypothesized by several eighteenth century religionists
- Pandeism has occasionally been used as a synonym for Omnism, a philosophy which deems all religions to be equal paths to the truth

== See also ==
- Pandey (disambiguation)
