= List of United Kingdom locations: Pab-Pap =

The United Kingdom

This is part of the list of United Kingdom locations: a gazetteer of place names in the United Kingdom showing each place's locality and geographical coordinates.

== Pab ==
Location	Locality	Coordinates (links to map & photo sources)	OS grid reference
Pabail Iarach	Western Isles	58.19°N 06.23°W	NB5131
Pabay	Highland	57.27°N 05.85°W	NG677270
Pabay Mòr	Western Isles	58.23°N 06.94°W	NB101380
Pabbay (South Uist)	Western Isles	57.15°N 07.32°W	NF781196
Pabbay (Harris)	Western Isles	57.77°N 07.23°W	NF892878
Pabbay (Barra Isles)	Western Isles	56.85°N 07.57°W	NL602876
Pabo	Conwy	53.28°N 03.80°W	SH8078

== Pac ==
Location	Locality	Coordinates (links to map & photo sources)	OS grid reference
Pachesham Park	Surrey	51.31°N 00.33°W	TQ1659
Packers Hill	Dorset	50.88°N 02.41°W	ST7110
Packington	Leicestershire	52.72°N 01.46°W	SK3614
Packmoor	City of Stoke-on-Trent	53.08°N 02.21°W	SJ8654
Packmores	Warwickshire	52.28°N 01.59°W	SP2865
Packwood	Warwickshire	52.35°N 01.75°W	SP1773
Packwood Gullet	Warwickshire	52.36°N 01.76°W	SP1674

== Pad ==
Location	Locality	Coordinates (links to map & photo sources)	OS grid reference
Padanaram	Angus	56.64°N 02.94°W	NO4251
Padbury	Buckinghamshire	51.96°N 00.95°W	SP7230
Paddington	Cheshire	53.39°N 02.55°W	SJ6389
Paddington	City of Westminster	51.51°N 00.18°W	TQ2681
Paddlesworth (Folkestone)	Kent	51.10°N 01.12°E	TR1939
Paddlesworth (Snodland)	Kent	51.33°N 00.41°E	TQ6862
Paddock	Kent	51.21°N 00.84°E	TQ9950
Paddock	Kirklees	53.64°N 01.81°W	SE1216
Paddockhaugh	Moray	57.60°N 03.34°W	NJ2058
Paddockhill	Cheshire	53.30°N 02.28°W	SJ8179
Paddock Wood	Kent	51.17°N 00.38°E	TQ6744
Paddolgreen	Shropshire	52.88°N 02.74°W	SJ5032
Padfield	Derbyshire	53.46°N 01.97°W	SK0296
Padgate	Cheshire	53.40°N 02.55°W	SJ6390
Padham's Green	Essex	51.64°N 00.36°E	TQ6497
Padiham	Lancashire	53.79°N 02.32°W	SD7933
Padog	Conwy	53.04°N 03.73°W	SH8451
Padside	North Yorkshire	54.02°N 01.75°W	SE1659
Padside Green	North Yorkshire	54.02°N 01.75°W	SE1659
Padson	Devon	50.75°N 04.04°W	SX5697
Padstow	Cornwall	50.53°N 04.95°W	SW9175
Padworth	Berkshire	51.38°N 01.11°W	SU6266
Padworth Common	Berkshire	51.37°N 01.11°W	SU6264

== Pag ==
Location	Locality	Coordinates (links to map & photo sources)	OS grid reference
Paganhill	Gloucestershire	51.74°N 02.23°W	SO8405
Page Bank	Durham	54.71°N 01.64°W	NZ2335
Page Moss	Knowsley	53.41°N 02.87°W	SJ4291
Page's Green	Suffolk	52.24°N 01.13°E	TM1465
Pagham	West Sussex	50.76°N 00.75°W	SZ8897
Paglesham Churchend	Essex	51.60°N 00.77°E	TQ9293
Paglesham Eastend	Essex	51.59°N 00.79°E	TQ9492

== Pai ==
Location	Locality	Coordinates (links to map & photo sources)	OS grid reference
Paignton	Devon	50.42°N 03.56°W	SX8960
Pailton	Warwickshire	52.42°N 01.31°W	SP4781
Painleyhill	Staffordshire	52.89°N 01.95°W	SK0333
Painscastle	Powys	52.10°N 03.22°W	SO1646
Painshawfield	Northumberland	54.93°N 01.90°W	NZ0660
Pains Hill	Surrey	51.24°N 00.01°E	TQ4151
Painsthorpe	East Riding of Yorkshire	54.01°N 00.76°W	SE8158
Painswick	Gloucestershire	51.77°N 02.20°W	SO8609
Painter's Forstal	Kent	51.28°N 00.85°E	TQ9958
Painter's Green	Hertfordshire	51.84°N 00.15°W	TL2718
Painters Green	Wrexham	52.95°N 02.74°W	SJ5040
Painthorpe	Wakefield	53.63°N 01.53°W	SE3115
Paintmoor	Somerset	50.87°N 02.93°W	ST3409
Pairc (Park)	Western Isles	58.01°N 06.54°W	NB315119
Pairc Shiaboist	Western Isles	58.31°N 06.68°W	NB2646
Paisley	Renfrewshire	55.83°N 04.42°W	NS4863

== Pak ==
Location	Locality	Coordinates (links to map & photo sources)	OS grid reference
Pakefield	Suffolk	52.44°N 01.72°E	TM5390
Pakenham	Suffolk	52.26°N 00.81°E	TL9267

== Pal ==
Location	Locality	Coordinates (links to map & photo sources)	OS grid reference
Palace Fields	Cheshire	53.31°N 02.69°W	SJ5480
Pale Green	Essex	52.05°N 00.40°E	TL6542
Palehouse Common	East Sussex	50.94°N 00.11°E	TQ4918
Palestine	Hampshire	51.15°N 01.62°W	SU2640
Paley Street	Berkshire	51.47°N 00.76°W	SU8676
Palfrey	Walsall	52.57°N 01.98°W	SP0197
Palgrave	Suffolk	52.35°N 01.09°E	TM1178
Pallaflat	Cumbria	54.49°N 03.56°W	NX9912
Pallington	Dorset	50.71°N 02.31°W	SY7891
Pallion	Sunderland	54.90°N 01.42°W	NZ3757
Pallister	Middlesbrough	54.56°N 01.21°W	NZ5119
Palmarsh	Kent	51.05°N 01.03°E	TR1333
Palmer Moor	Derbyshire	52.89°N 01.80°W	SK1333
Palmersbridge	Cornwall	50.56°N 04.55°W	SX1977
Palmers Cross	Staffordshire	52.60°N 02.17°W	SJ8801
Palmers Cross	Surrey	51.15°N 00.54°W	TQ0240
Palmer's Flat	Gloucestershire	51.77°N 02.61°W	SO5809
Palmer's Green	Kent	51.14°N 00.40°E	TQ6841
Palmers Green	Enfield	51.62°N 00.12°W	TQ3093
Palmerstown	The Vale Of Glamorgan	51.41°N 03.25°W	ST1369
Palmersville	North Tyneside	55.02°N 01.54°W	NZ2970
Palmstead	Kent	51.18°N 01.08°E	TR1647
Palnackie	Dumfries and Galloway	54.88°N 03.84°W	NX8256
Palterton	Derbyshire	53.20°N 01.29°W	SK4768

== Pam ==
Location	Locality	Coordinates (links to map & photo sources)	OS grid reference
Pamber End	Hampshire	51.31°N 01.12°W	SU6158
Pamber Green	Hampshire	51.32°N 01.14°W	SU6059
Pamber Heath	Hampshire	51.35°N 01.12°W	SU6162
Pamington	Gloucestershire	51.99°N 02.08°W	SO9433
Pamphill	Dorset	50.79°N 02.01°W	ST9900
Pampisford	Cambridgeshire	52.11°N 00.17°E	TL4948

== Pan ==
Location	Locality	Coordinates (links to map & photo sources)	OS grid reference
Pan	Isle of Wight	50.68°N 01.29°W	SZ5088
Panborough	Somerset	51.20°N 02.76°W	ST4745
Panbride	Angus	56.50°N 02.70°W	NO5735
Pancakehill	Gloucestershire	51.79°N 01.91°W	SP0611
Pancrasweek	Devon	50.81°N 04.42°W	SS2905
Pancross	The Vale Of Glamorgan	51.41°N 03.38°W	ST0469
Pandy (Bryn-crug)	Gwynedd	52.59°N 04.03°W	SH6202
Pandy (Dolgellau)	Gwynedd	52.73°N 03.89°W	SH7217
Pandy (Llanuwchllyn)	Gwynedd	52.84°N 03.67°W	SH8729
Pandy	Monmouthshire	51.89°N 02.97°W	SO3322
Pandy	Powys	52.62°N 03.62°W	SH9004
Pandy (Ceiriog Valley)	Wrexham	52.90°N 03.20°W	SJ1935
Pandy (Hanmer)	Wrexham	52.98°N 02.86°W	SJ4243
Pandy'r Capel	Denbighshire	53.03°N 03.37°W	SJ0850
Pandy Tudur	Conwy	53.16°N 03.72°W	SH8564
Panfield	Essex	51.89°N 00.51°E	TL7325
Pangbourne	Berkshire	51.47°N 01.09°W	SU6376
Panhall	Fife	56.11°N 03.12°W	NT3092
Panks Bridge	Herefordshire	52.12°N 02.55°W	SO6248
Pannal	North Yorkshire	53.95°N 01.54°W	SE3051
Pannal Ash	North Yorkshire	53.96°N 01.55°W	SE2952
Pannel's Ash	Essex	52.04°N 00.55°E	TL7542
Panpunton	Shropshire	52.34°N 03.05°W	SO2872
Panshanger	Hertfordshire	51.80°N 00.18°W	TL2513
Pant	Denbighshire	53.05°N 03.19°W	SJ2052
Pant	Flintshire	53.25°N 03.30°W	SJ1374
Pant	Gwynedd	52.84°N 04.65°W	SH2131
Pant	Merthyr Tydfil	51.76°N 03.36°W	SO0608
Pant	Powys	52.58°N 03.40°W	SJ0500
Pant	Shropshire	52.79°N 03.08°W	SJ2722
Pant (Rhosllannerchrugog)	Wrexham	52.99°N 03.05°W	SJ2945
Pant (Gresford)	Wrexham	53.08°N 02.97°W	SJ3555
Pantasaph	Flintshire	53.26°N 03.26°W	SJ1675
Pantdu	Neath Port Talbot	51.60°N 03.77°W	SS7791
Panteg	Ceredigion	52.23°N 04.27°W	SN4562
Panteg	Torfaen	51.68°N 02.99°W	ST3199
Pantersbridge	Cornwall	50.48°N 04.60°W	SX1568
Pant Glas	Gwynedd	52.99°N 04.28°W	SH4747
Pant-glas	Shropshire	52.88°N 03.08°W	SJ2732
Pant Mawr	Powys	52.42°N 03.70°W	SN8482
Pantmawr	Cardiff	51.52°N 03.24°W	ST1481
Panton	Lincolnshire	53.28°N 00.24°W	TF1778
Pant-pastynog	Denbighshire	53.13°N 03.43°W	SJ0461
Pantperthog	Gwynedd	52.61°N 03.86°W	SH7404
Pantside	Caerphilly	51.66°N 03.14°W	ST2197
Pant-y-Caws	Carmarthenshire	51.90°N 04.70°W	SN1426
Pant-y-crug	Ceredigion	52.38°N 03.98°W	SN6578
Pant-y-dwr	Powys	52.35°N 03.49°W	SN9874
Pant-y-ffridd	Powys	52.60°N 03.25°W	SJ1502
Pantyffynnon	Carmarthenshire	51.78°N 04.00°W	SN6211
Pantygasseg	Torfaen	51.692°N 03.084°W	ST2599
Pantymwyn	Flintshire	53.16°N 03.21°W	SJ1964
Pant-y-pyllau	Bridgend	51.52°N 03.55°W	SS9282
Pant-yr-awel	Bridgend	51.57°N 03.55°W	SS9287
Pant y Wacco	Flintshire	53.27°N 03.29°W	SJ1476
Panxworth	Norfolk	52.66°N 01.45°E	TG3413

== Pap ==
Location	Locality	Coordinates (links to map & photo sources)	OS grid reference
Papa	Shetland Islands	60.12°N 01.35°W	HU361374
Papa Little	Shetland Islands	60.32°N 01.39°W	HU335606
Papa Stour	Shetland Islands	60.33°N 01.70°W	HU162607
Papa Stronsay	Orkney Islands	59.15°N 02.58°W	HY664297
Papa Westray	Orkney Islands	59.35°N 02.89°W	HY491523
Papcastle	Cumbria	54.66°N 03.39°W	NY1031
Papermill Bank	Shropshire	52.82°N 02.66°W	SJ5525
Papigoe	Highland	58.44°N 03.06°W	ND3851
Papil	Shetland Islands	60.06°N 01.35°W	HU3631
Papley	Northamptonshire	52.48°N 00.38°W	TL1089
Papplewick	Nottinghamshire	53.05°N 01.19°W	SK5451
Papworth Everard	Cambridgeshire	52.25°N 00.12°W	TL2863
Papworth St Agnes	Cambridgeshire	52.26°N 00.15°W	TL2664
