= Pandy =

A pandy is a Welsh name for a fulling mill, and may refer to:

== Places in Wales ==
- Pandy, Bryn-crug, a location in Gwynedd
- Pandy, Dolgellau, a location in Gwynedd
- Pandy, Llanuwchllyn, a location in Gwynedd
- Pandy, Conwy, an electoral ward near Llanfairfechan, Conwy
- Pandy Tudur, a village in Conwy
- Pandy, Monmouthshire, a village near Abergavenny
- Pandy, Powys, a village in Powys
- Pandy, Ceiriog Valley, a village between Glyn Ceiriog and Llanarmon Dyffryn Ceiriog
- Pandy, Gwersyllt, a village near Gresford and Wrexham
- Pandy, Hanmer, a hamlet near Halghton, English Maelor, Wrexham

== Other uses ==
- András Pándy (1927–2013), Belgian-Hungarian serial killer
- Pandy Paws, a character from Gabby's Dollhouse

== See also ==
- Andy Pandy, a British children's television series
- Pandya dynasty, ancient Indian dynasty of southern India
- Pandya (surname), Indian surname
- Pandi
