= Panday =

Panday or Ang Panday may refer to:

- Panday (comics), a Philippine comics character created by Carlo J. Caparas and Steve Gan
  - Ang Panday (1980 film), a series of fantasy films from the Philippines, starring Fernando Poe, Jr.
  - Panday (2005 TV series), a TV series produced by ABS-CBN
  - Ang Panday (2009 film), a film produced by GMA Films
  - Ang Panday 2, a sequel for Panday; a film produced by GMA Films
    - Panday Kids, a sequel to the 2009 GMA film
  - Ang Panday (2016 TV series), a TV series produced by TV5
  - Ang Panday (2017 film), seventh installment of the film series distributed by Star Cinema, and produced by CCM Productions and Viva Films.
- "Ang Panday" (song), single from 2017 film

== People with the name or surname ==
- Panday Pira (1488–1576), Filipino blacksmith acknowledged as "The First Filipino Cannon-maker"

A variation of the Pandey surname

- Pandey, a surname found among the Hindu Brahmin communities of India and both the Brahmin and Chhetri communities of Nepal
  - Pande family, a noble dynasty of Nepal also spelled as Panday
  - Ananya Panday, Indian actress, daughter of Chunky
  - Basdeo Panday, former Prime Minister of Trinidad and Tobago, of Indian origin
  - Chunky Panday, Indian actor, son of Sharad
  - Mickela Panday, Trinidad politician, daughter of Basdeo
  - Sharad Panday, India cardiologist

== See also ==
- Pandey (disambiguation)
