= Padham's Green =

Hamlet in Essex, England

Coordinates: 51.653°N 0.379°E

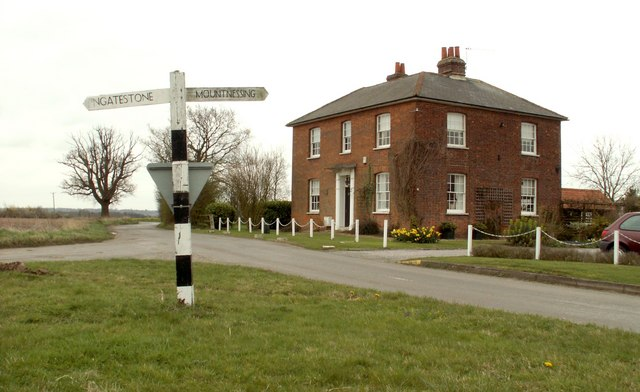

- Location within Essex
- Civil parish: Mountnessing
- District: Brentwood
- Shire county: Essex
- Region: East
- Country: England
- Sovereign state: United Kingdom
- Post town: Ingatestone
- Postcode district: CM4

Padham's Green is a hamlet in the Brentwood district, in the English county of Essex. It is near the town of Ingatestone. It is assumed to be a manorial name, deriving from the family of William de Perham.
