= Bhim Bahadur Pande =

Nepalese diplomat (1914–1992)

Sardar Bhim Bahadur Pande Kshatri
- सरदार भीम बहादुर पाँडे क्षत्री
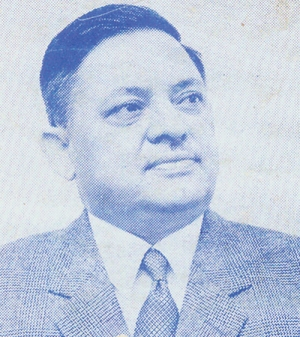
- Sardar Bhim Bahadur Pande Kshatri

Nepalese Ambassador to India
- In office 21 May 1969 – 24 May 1972
- Preceded by: Jharendra Narayan Singh
- Succeeded by: Krishna Bom Malla

Personal details
- Children: 5 sons; Late General Sagar Bahadur Pande, General. Pawan Bahadur Pande, Himalaya Bahadur Pande, Prithvi Bahadur Pande, Dr.Shanta Bahadur Pande

Bhim Bahadur Pande (1914−1992)(Nepali: भीमबहादुर पाँडे) was a Nepalese diplomat, bureaucrat and historian. He served as Nepalese Ambassador to India from May 21, 1969 to May 24, 1972. Sardar Bhim Bahadur also served to Juddha Shumsher Jang Bahadur Rana during his youth. He helped out to industrialize the Nepalese Tarai. He later wrote a book about challenges of industrialization in Terai called Tyas Bakhat Ko Nepal. He was a member of representative group of Nepal in the 1950 Indo-Nepal Treaty of Peace and Friendship. He wrote in the same book about the prejudiced and dominant behaviour of Indian authority on signing the Treaty. He also wrote about tyranny of Rana dynasty in the Nepalese literature and education sector.

Pandé was first Nepalese Ambassador to Germany, who took office on July 5, 1965. He served in this capacity until March 8, 1969. He also wrote book on genealogy of his ancestral Pande dynasty called Rastra Bhaktiko Jhalak: Panday Bamsa ko Bhumika. He has five sons including banker Prithvi Bahadur Pande who is chairman of Nepal Investment Bank.

== Notable works ==
- Tyas Bakhat Ko Nepal
- Rastrabhakti Ko Jhalak
