= Palmersbridge =

Hamlet in Cornwall, England

Coordinates: 50.570°N 4.554°W

- Location within Cornwall
- OS grid reference: SX192776
- Unitary authority: Cornwall
- Ceremonial county: Cornwall
- Region: South West
- Country: England
- Sovereign state: United Kingdom

Palmersbridge is a hamlet on the A30 main road northeast of Bolventor in Cornwall, England, UK.
