= Pantersbridge =

Hamlet in Cornwall, England

Coordinates: 50.483°N 4.598°W

Pantersbridge: Cornish: Pons Yesu
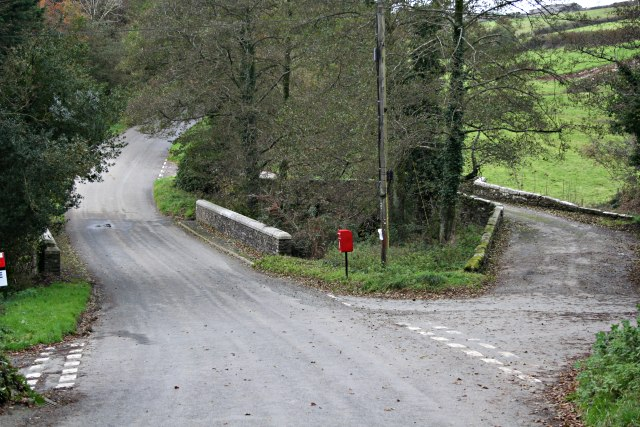
- The two road bridges at Pantersbridge (the old bridge on the right was built in the 15th century)

- Location within Cornwall
- OS grid reference: SX158680
- Civil parish: St Neot
- Unitary authority: Cornwall
- Ceremonial county: Cornwall
- Region: South West
- Country: England
- Sovereign state: United Kingdom

Pantersbridge (Cornish: Pons Yesu, meaning Jesus Bridge)is a hamlet in the parish of St Neot, Cornwall, England, UK. It is about one mile south of Warleggan on the road from St Neot to Cardinham and on the River Warleggan. Early spellings of the name include Pontyesu in 1241 and Ponteisu, circa 1250, Pontewysy in 1359, becoming Pontwise Bridge, or Pontowise bridge by 1613.
