= José Olaguer Feliú =

Philippine-born Spanish military officer and politician

José Olaguer Feliú y Ramírez
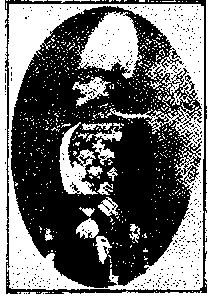

Minister of War of Spain
- In office 8 March 1922 – 15 July 1922
- Monarch: Alfonso XIII
- Prime Minister: José Sánchez Guerra y Martínez
- Preceded by: Juan de la Cierva y Peñafiel
- Succeeded by: José Sánchez-Guerra y Martínez

Personal details
- Born: October 25, 1857 Manila, Captaincy General of the Philippines
- Died: November 21, 1929 (aged 72) Madrid, Spain
- Spouse: Josefina García
- Awards: Cross of Maria Christina Grand Cross of the Military Merit Cross of Charles III; Laureate Cross of Saint Ferdinand; Gran Cross of San Hermenegildo

Military service
- Years of service: 1876-1927
- Rank: Lieutenant General
- Commands: Captain General of Catalonia
- Battles/wars: Philippine Revolution: Battle of Kakarong de Sili

José Olaguer Feliú y Ramírez (October 25, 1857 – November 21, 1929) was a Spanish lieutenant general, Minister of War and politician.

== Biography ==
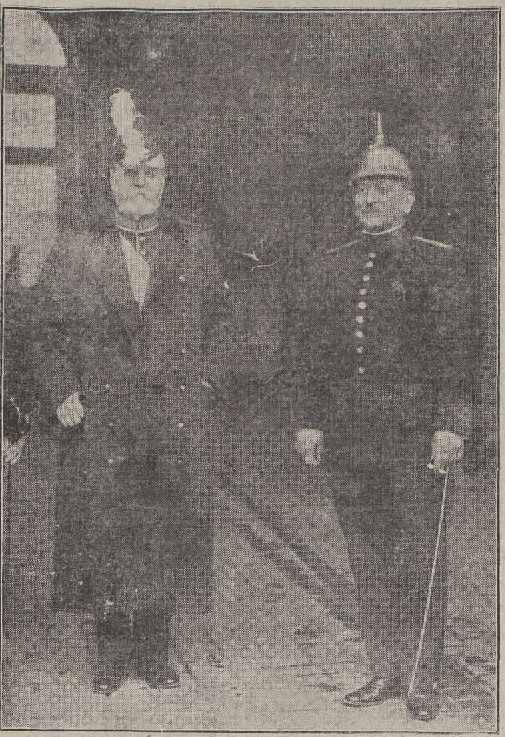
Prime Minister Sánchez Guerra (left) with Gen. José Olaguer Feliú (right), appointed as the new Spanish Minister of War in March 1922.

Olaguer Feliú was born on October 25, 1857, in Manila, but both parents were Spanish of Catalan origin. In 1876 he entered the Academy of the General Staff.

In 1882 he was promoted to lieutenant and served in different places in Spain.

In 1890 he went to the Philippines with the rank of commandant. He was director of the School of Arts and Crafts in Manila.

Olaguer Feliú took an active part in numerous military operations during the Philippines Campaign. He participated in the Battle of Kakarong de Sili in the island of Luzon on January 1, 1897, where the Commandant Olaguer Feliu achieved victory with only 600 men against 6.000 indigenous fighters katipuneros. As a result he was promoted to the rank of lieutenant colonel and was awarded the prestigious Laureate Cross of Saint Ferdinand.

Feliú was then appointed as Chief of Staff to the Commanding Officer of Luzon.

A year later he was promoted to the rank of colonel in recognition of his performance in operations in the province of Zambales.

Following the outbreak of the war with the United States, Olaguer Feliú remained in Manila where he performed distinguished services during the siege and blockade during the Battle of Manila. As Deputy Chief of Staff of the Captaincy General of Manila, Olaguer Feliú was one of the senior officers who participated in the surrender of the city.

In 1898 he returned to mainland Spain with the rank of Colonel and in 1902 was appointed as chief of staff of the Captaincy General of Galicia.

In 1910 he was promoted to the rank of Brigade General and was appointed as Chief of Staff of the Second Region, a position he held until 1915. Then he was promoted to divisional general and given command of the Second Division.

In 1912 Brigadier-General Feliú was awarded the Grand Cross of the Order of Military Merit.

In 1916 he was awarded the Grand Cross of the Royal and Military Order of San Hermenegildo.

In 1917 he was appointed Military Governor of Cádiz, taking up command of the Ninth Division the same year.

In 1918 Olaguer Feliú was received as an academic member of the Royal Hispanic-American Academy of Cadiz.

In 1921 he was promoted to the rank of lieutenant general and assumed the command of the Captaincy General of Catalonia until 1922, where he was replaced by Lieutenant General Miguel Primo de Rivera, 2nd Marquis of Estella

In March 1922, Lieutenant-General Jose Olaguer Feliú was appointed as Minister of War by José Sánchez Guerra, Prime Minister of Spain.

Olaguer Feliú occupied the position of Minister of War during one of the most difficult and turbulent periods in modern Spanish military and political history: firstly the Moroccan campaign exacerbated by the hesitation of the government, after the events of the Disaster of Annual in July 1921; and on the other hand the actions of the military defenses boards (political juntas organised amongst the officer corps of the Spanish Army). All of these occurred in the middle of intense press and parliamentary debate about the report known as the Expediente Picasso (concerning responsibility for the Annual disaster). He resigned in July 1922.

Then he was appointed Captain General of the Fifth Region of Aragon.

In August 1923 Olaguer Feliú became Director General of Carabineros of Spain, where he improved the service conditions of the personnel of this frontier guard/customs force. Amongst other reforms he reduced the daily working hours to twelve hours. He organised the expansion and improvement of the Colleges of the Carabineros (training academy). Feliú arranged for the repair of existing barracks asd well as the construction of new buildings; as well as the creation of schools for the children of Carabineros. These improvements were undertaken at a time of budgetary constraints imposed by the Government, in spite of opposition from within both the Carabineros and Army hierarchy. Finally He increased the number of vacancies in the Alfonso XIII Orphans College of El Escorial and tripled the number of orphan students in the Pastoras Sisters College of Madrid.

In 1924 he was awarded the Grand Cross of Christ by the Government of Portugal.

On 14 December 1925 he was appointed as a member of the Army Review Board for Generals, Colonels (Junta Classificadora de Ascensos de Generales, Coroneles y asimilados del Ejército in Spanish).

In 1927 Olaguer Feliú was elected as State Representative and as Representative of National Life Activities, for the National Consultative Assembly, remaining in this position until 1928.

In 1927 by order of His Majesty the King, Lieutenant General José Olaguer Feliú retired as Director General of Carabineros and passed into the first reserve.

On November 21, 1929, Olaguer Feliú died in Madrid.
