= Prithvi Bahadur Pande =

Nepalese banker

Prithvi Bahadur Pandé
- पृथ्वीबहादुर पाँडे

Founder & Chairman of Nepal Investment Mega Bank Limited

Founding Director of Himalayan Bank Limited
- In office non incumbent

Personal details
- Parent: Bhim Bahadur Pande (father)

Prithvi Bahadur Pandé (Nepali: पृथ्वीबहादुर पाँडे) is the chairman of Nepal Investment Mega Bank Limited (NIMB). He is one of the most renowned bankers of Nepal, a pioneer in the commercial banking sector. He started the Himalayan Bank in 1992, Nepal's first commercial bank, opening up the commercial banking sector for all to follow. After this success he took over the French managed Indo-Suez Bank and successfully operated it for more than 15 years. He was an employee of Nepal Rastra Bank and had worked as director of Rastriya Banijya Bank and founding director of Himalayan Bank Limited before leading Nepal Investment Bank in 2001 through foreign investment. On 23rd General Assembly of Nepal Bankers Association(NBA), he was felicitated for making a remarkable contribution for the development of Nepalese banking sector. He is also Chairman of Chhaya Center, which is a multi-stored commercial building located in Thamel, hosting the world-renowned Marriott Group's Aloft Hotels, a five star hotel in Thamel.

== Family ==
He was born as third son to diplomat-historian Sardar Bhim Bahadur Pande and Chhaya Devi and is the eighth descendant of Kaji of Gorkha Kingdom, Kalu Pande. He is married to Pratima Rajya Lakshmi Rana, the eldest daughter of the First Governor of Nepal, Himalaya Shumsher Jung Bahadur Rana. Right now he serves as chairman of Nepal Investment Mega Bank after successful merger between Nepal Investment Bank Limited and Mega Bank.

He completed his Chartered Accountancy degree from Delhi in 1978.
