= Pandi Gëllçi =

Albanian volleyball coach

Pandi Gëllçi is a notable Albanian volleyball coach of the women team of Skenderbeu. His team was the only rival of Dinamo Tirana team in the 1980s, when Dinamo often reached the European final four of the Women's CEV Champions League.
