= Balagtas, Bulacan =

Municipality in Bulacan, Philippines

Balagtas Bigaa
- Municipality
- Municipality of Balagtas
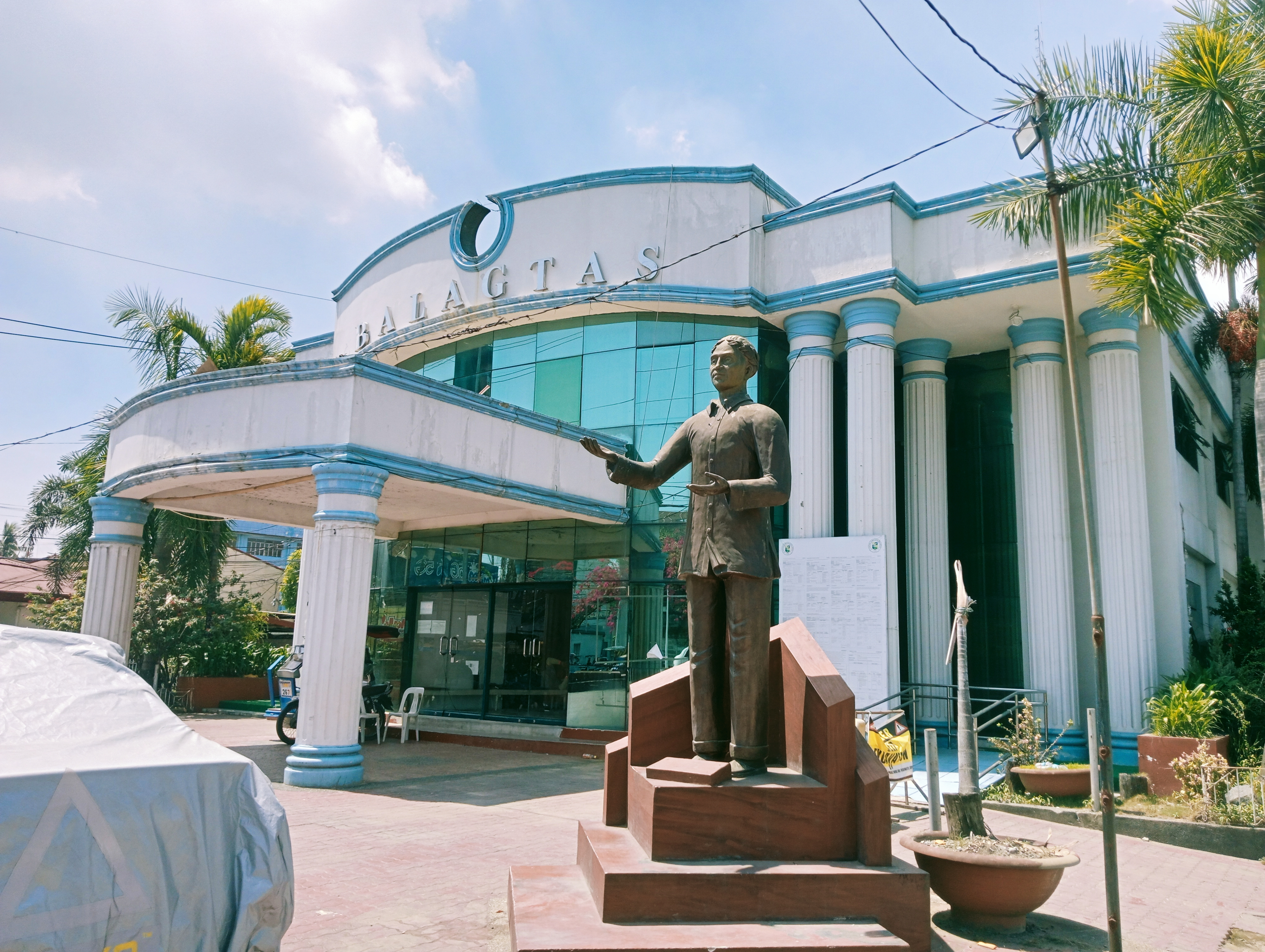
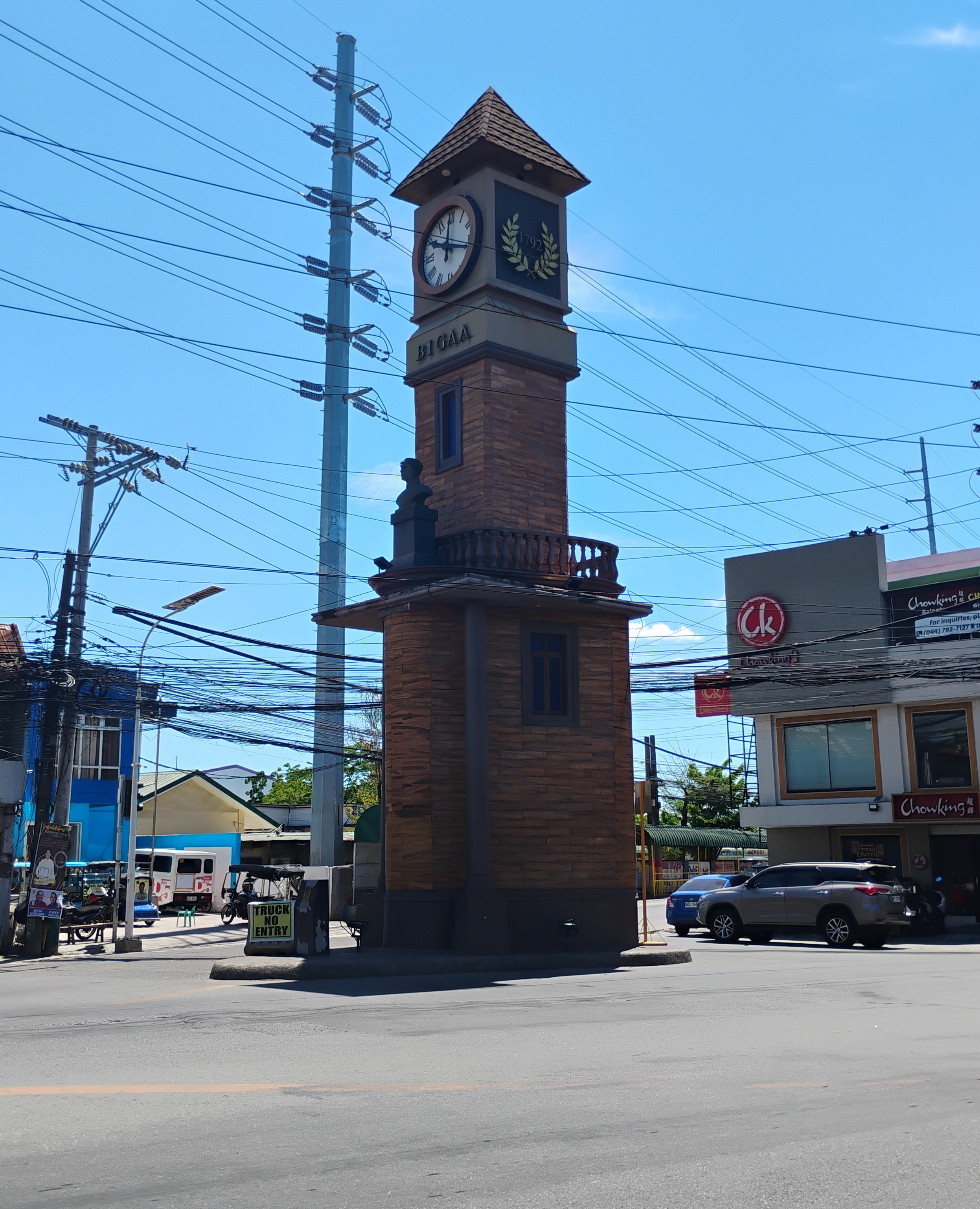
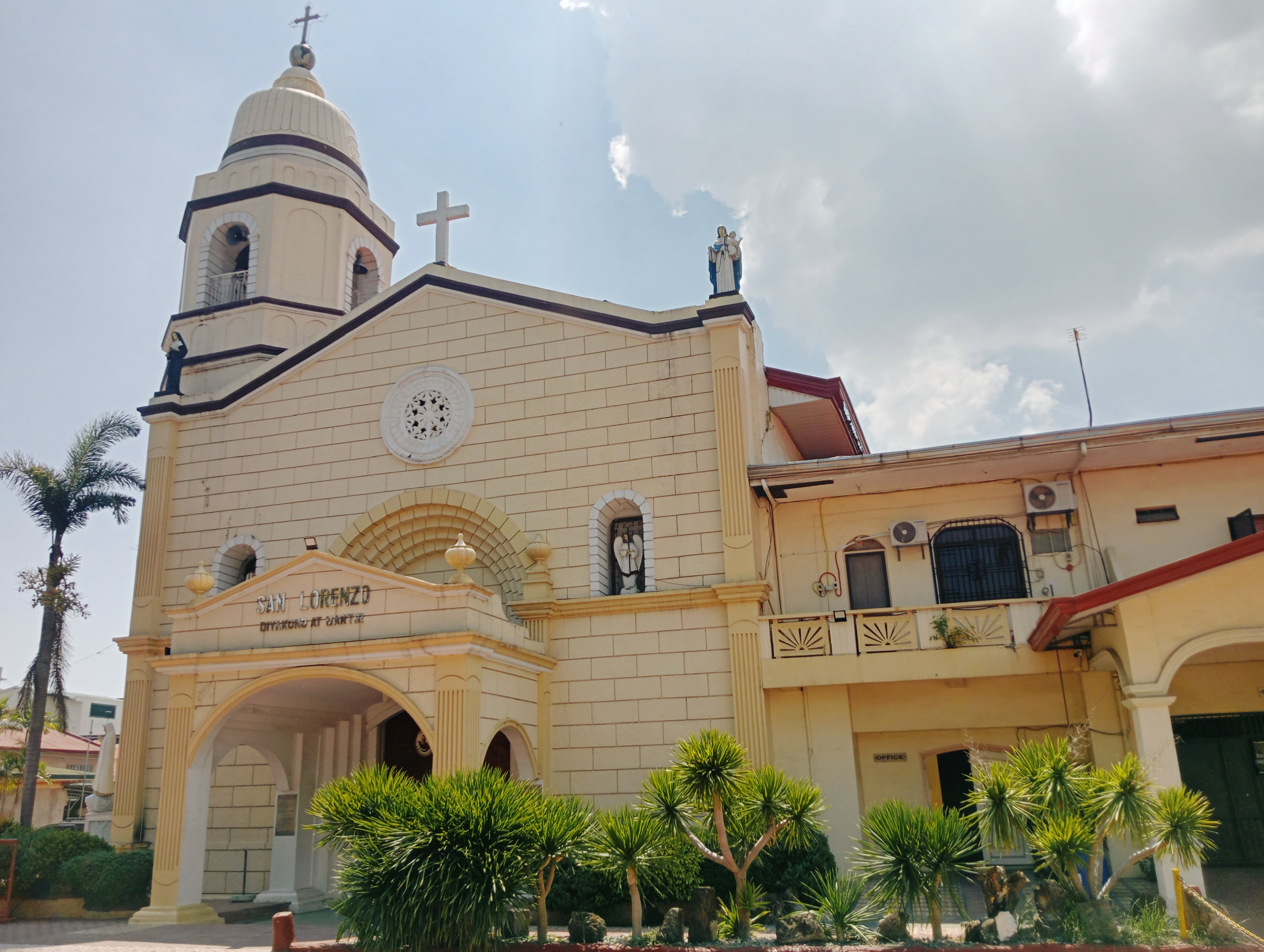
- Old Balagtas Municipal Hall Balagtas Clock Tower Saint Lawrence Deacon & Martyr Parish Church

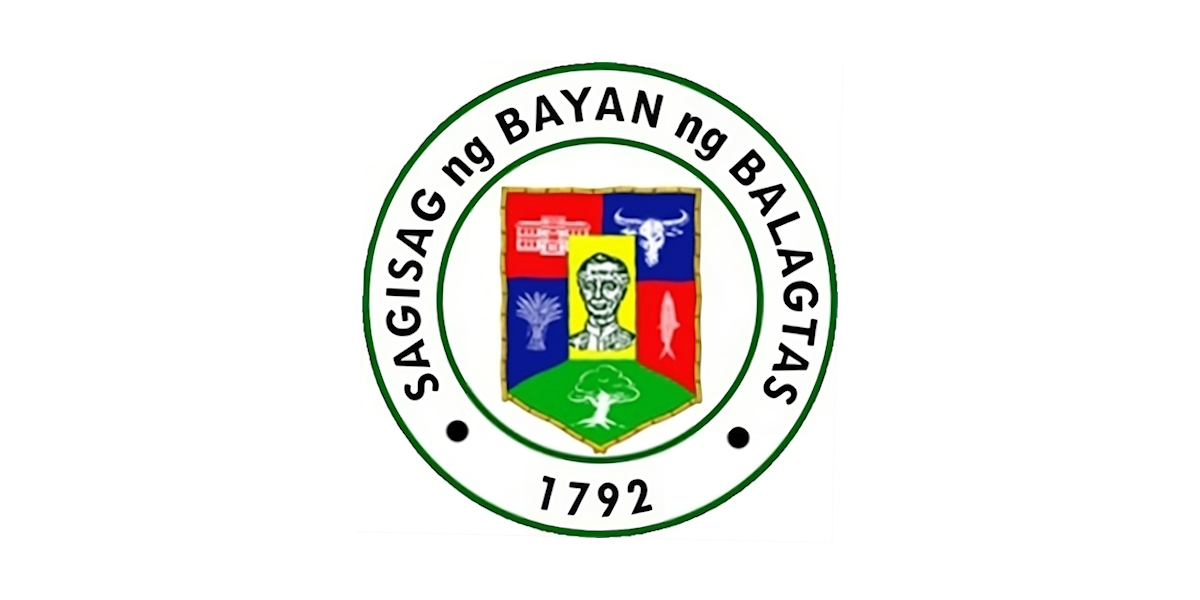
- Flag
- Nickname: Bayan ng Makata
- Motto(s): Sulong Na, Bagong Balagtas
- Anthem: Balagtas Hymn
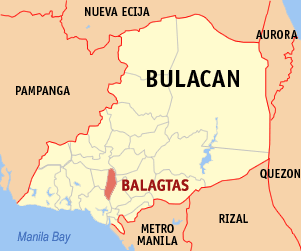
- Map of Bulacan with Balagtas highlighted
- Interactive map of Balagtas
- Location within the Philippines
- Coordinates: 14°48′52″N 120°54′30″E
- Country: Philippines
- Region: Central Luzon
- Province: Bulacan
- District: 5th district
- Founded: 1596
- Renamed: June 18, 1966
- Named for: Francisco Balagtas
- Barangays: 9 (see Barangays)

Government
  - Type: Sangguniang Bayan
  - Mayor: Adrian J. Santiago (PFP)
  - Vice Mayor: Mikee Jane P. Gonda (PFP)
  - Representative: Agatha Paula A. Cruz (Lakas-CMD)
  - Municipal Council: Members: Babby L. Estrella; Ian S. De Guzman; Esmeraldo I. Magbitang Jr.; Charles Louie B. Galvez; Alberto L. Santiago; Jeffrey J. Ventura; Gerald S. Vergara; Gilbert L. Galvez
  - Electorate: 55,008 voters (2025)

Area
  - Total: 28.66 km^{2} (11.07 sq mi)
- Elevation: 8.0 m (26.2 ft)
- Highest elevation: 33 m (108 ft)
- Lowest elevation: −3 m (−9.8 ft)

Population (2024 census)
  - Total: 80,221
  - Density: 2,799/km^{2} (7,250/sq mi)
  - Households: 19,461
- Demonym(s): Balagtaseño (Male); Balagtaseña (Female)

Economy
  - Income class: 1st municipal income class
  - Poverty incidence: 11.72% (2023)
  - Revenue: ₱ 420.4 million (2024)
  - Assets: ₱ 840.2 million (2024)
  - Expenditure: ₱ 403.7 million (2024)
  - Liabilities: ₱ 200.3 million (2024)

Utilities
  - Electricity: Meralco
- Time zone: UTC+8 (PST)
- ZIP code: 3016
- PSGC: 0301402000
- IDD : area code: +63 (0)44
- Native languages: Tagalog

Balagtas ([bɐlɐgˈtas]), officially the Municipality of Balagtas (Tagalog: Bayan ng Balagtas), is a municipality in the province of Bulacan, Philippines. According to the 2024 census, it has a population of 80,221 people.

== Etymology ==
The town was formerly known as Bigaa ([bigaˈʔa]) and it was renamed in honor of Filipino poet Francisco Balagtas who was born and raised in Bigaa.

== History ==
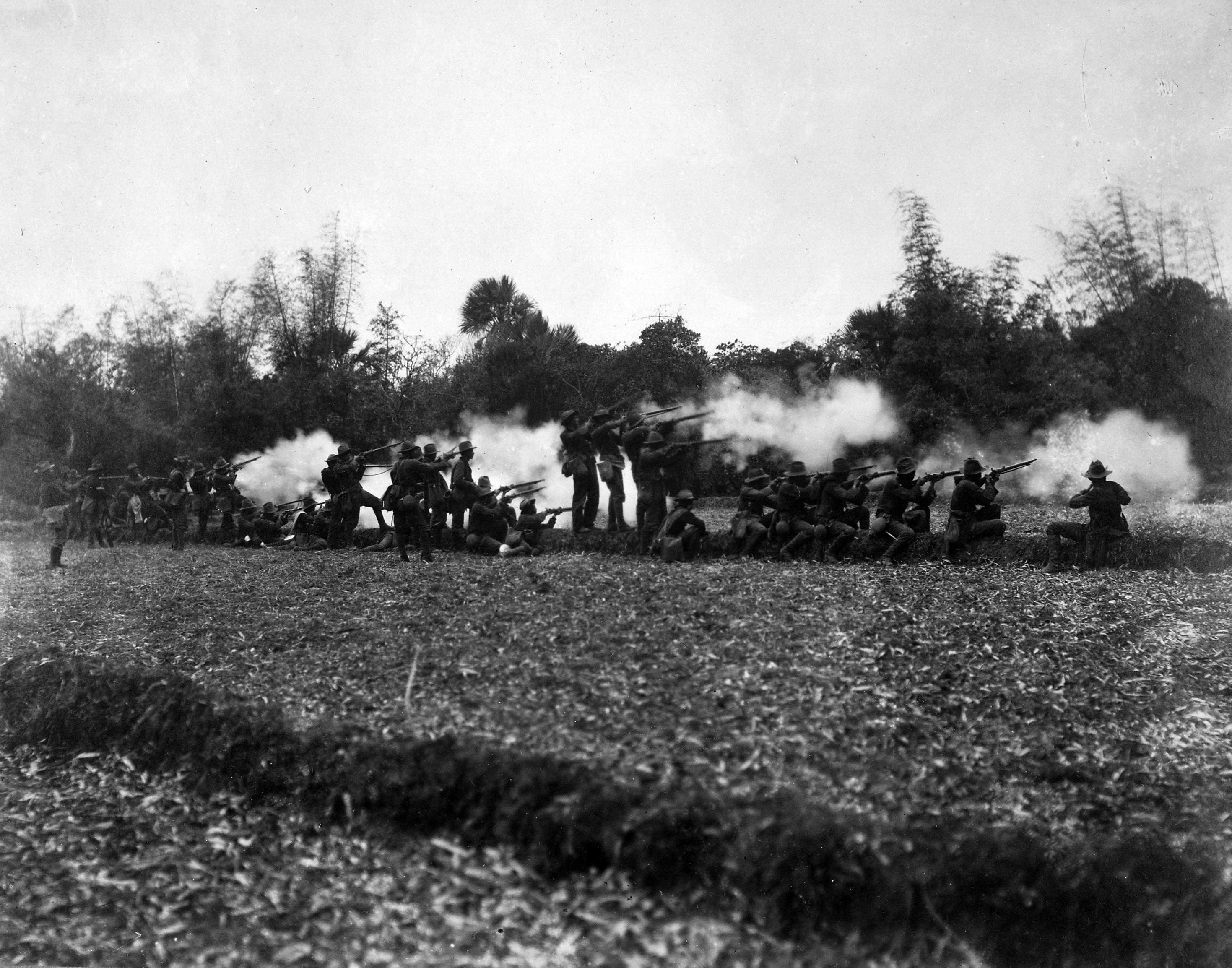
American infantry firing at Filipino insurgents at Bigaa, 1899

Originally known as Caruya/Caluya as per the historical records regarding the early years of the establishment of Bulacan Province, Caruya was one of the encomiendas of the vast region La Pampanga falls under the Alcalde Mayor of Bulacan. Encomienda de Caruya was Encomienda of the King of Spain which appeared in Miguel de Loarca's Relacion de las Isla Filipinas in 1582 and the Report of Governor-General Luis Pérez Dasmariñas of June 21, 1591, document. The propagation of Catholic instructions in Caruya initially belonged to Bulakan Convent and was directly administered by the Alcalde Mayor of Bulacan, but it was transferred to the Malolos Convent on an uncertain date.

Bigaa was one of the ancient towns of the province - together with Calumpit, which was founded in 1571 (became Town in 1575); Bulakan, which was founded in 1575 (became Town in 1578); Meycauayan, which was founded in 1578; Malolos, which was founded in 1571 (became Town in 1580); and, Binto, which was founded in 1581 (a former visita of Malolos became Town renamed as Binto y Quingua 1602). The Catalogo of 1591 indicates the existence of Guiguinto y Caruyan with 4,800 souls and it was administered by a religious from Bulacan Convent. In 1608 Historia de la Provincia Agustiana mentioned Caruyan as pueblo and convent. The Catalogo of 1612 says that Caruyan had 2 sacerdos, 800 Tributos, 2,400 Almas. (Historia de La Provincia Agustiana del Santisimo Nombre de Jesus de Filipinas Vol.1 of Isacio Rodriguez OSA)

On other data, the Center for Bulacan Studies in their "La Primera Provincia" published in 2010 p. 138 mentioned that Bigaa came from Malolos as its matrix with an independence date of 1621. It could be assumed that Bigaa was later transferred to Malolos Cathedral Convent in uncertain date but La Primera did not mention that Bigaa originally came from Bulakan town but instead in Malolos.

A long time before the construction of the church at Wawa, the original location of the town center where the hermitage and the base of Spanish instruction in Bigaa were at Barrio Dalig where Sitio Caruyan was located.

It is very unclear when Caruya was formally organized into an administrative town with its own Gobernadorcillo. It was renamed Bigaa sometime in the 1700s. Bigaa suggests a kind of plant which is Taro o Gabi.

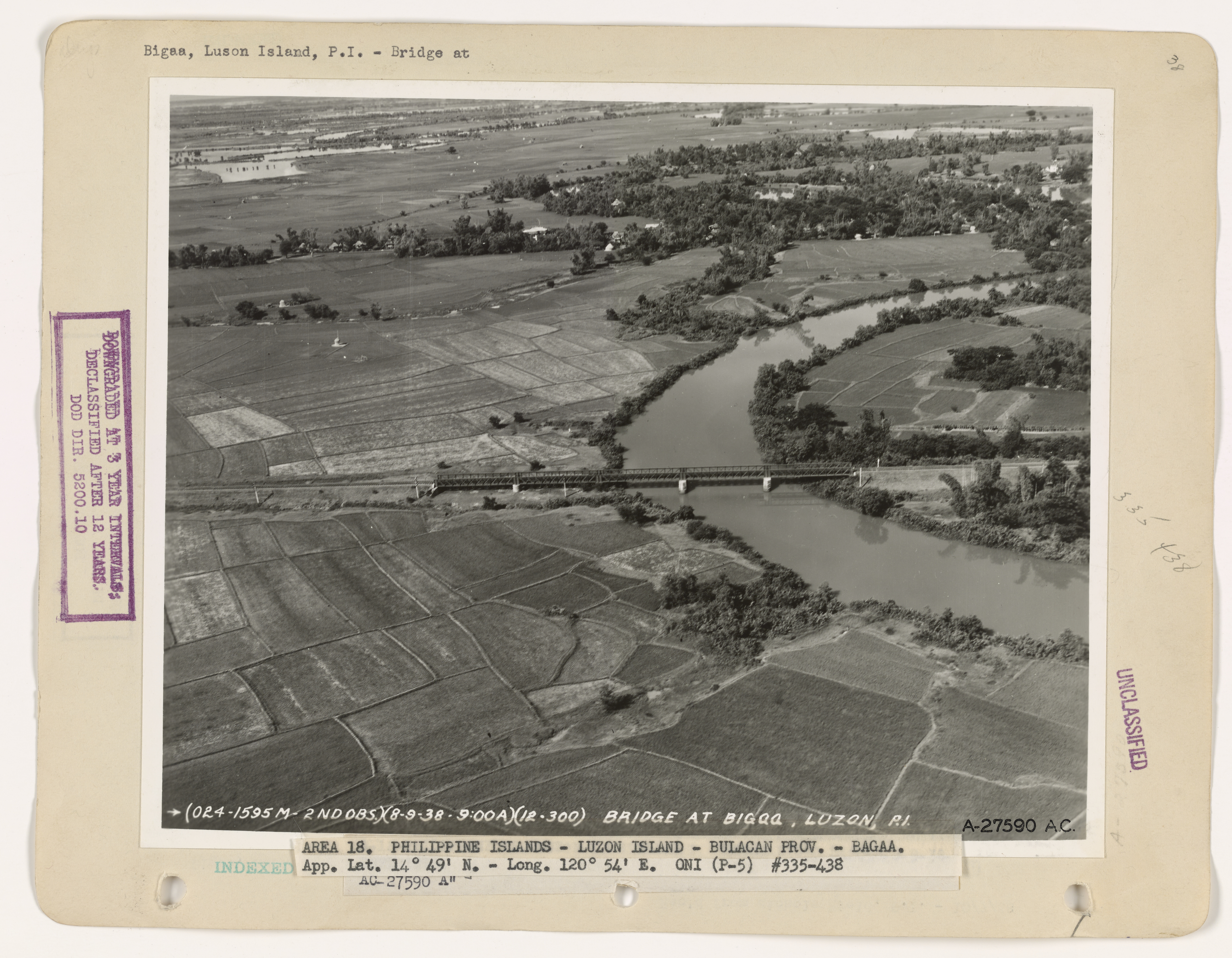
Portion of Bigaa in 1938

During the Philippine revolution the "insurrectos" and the "Guardia civiles". Many people died, further decimating the town, which has suffered from a cholera epidemic and nearly wiped out the population 20 years before. When the Americans established civil government in 1903, Bigaa and Bocaue were integrated with each other and in 1911, it was separated again and in the same year, the former Hacienda de Pandi, which included in the geographical jurisdiction of Town of Bigaa. In 1946, during the tenure of Bigaa Mayor Manuel Santos, Pandi was detached from Bigaa shortly after the Philippines gained political freedom from the United States and Pandi was established as a municipal entity by virtue of legislative fiat.

== Geography ==
Balagtas was part of the 1st district until 1972 and 2nd district along with Baliwag, Bocaue, Bustos, Guiguinto, and Pandi from 1987 to 2022. It was moved to 5th district along with Bocaue, Guiguinto, and Pandi. With the continuous expansion of Metro Manila, Balagtas is part of Manila's built up area which reaches San Ildefonso, Bulacan in its northernmost part.

The municipality is 30 kilometers (19 mi) from Manila and is 15 kilometers (9.3 mi) from Malolos City.

The MacArthur Highway bisects the municipality of Balagtas as this national road cuts northward to the Cagayan Valley. At the southern approach of the town from Manila is a concrete bridge that crosses the Balagtas River. The river, navigable by banca and motor boats, empties into Manila bay after snaking through the town of Bulacan to the West which provides Balagtas' townsfolk with fish, shrimp, and other fresh water food.

At the foot of the bridge, along the highway towards the North, is the town hall. In front of the town hall is a park where the monument of its hero, Francisco "Balagtas" Baltazar is located. The town hall is surrounded by Spanish colonial type houses. Two hundred meters from the municipal hall is the barrio of Panginay, the birthplace of Francisco Balagtas, for whom also "Balagtasan", a form of debate in versified Tagalog, was named. In 1946 the Historical Society of the Philippines placed a marker at the birthplace of Balagtas. In reverence to the hero's deeds, the official name of Bigaa was changed to Balagtas through the legislative act sponsored by then Congressman, Teodulo Natividad.

=== Barangays ===
Balagtas is politically subdivided into 9 barangays, as shown in the matrix below. Each barangay consists of puroks and some have sitios.

PSGC	Barangay	Population			±% p.a.	
		2024		2010		
031402002	Borol 2nd	9.0%	7,243	7,801	▾	−0.51%
031402003	Borol 1st	12.7%	10,190	10,179	▴	0.01%
031402004	Dalig	2.4%	1,949	1,832	▴	0.43%
031402005	Longos	3.5%	2,779	2,607	▴	0.44%
031402007	Panginay	15.7%	12,578	12,461	▴	0.06%
031402008	Pulong Gubat	9.6%	7,701	4,141	▴	4.36%
031402009	San Juan	12.7%	10,158	9,238	▴	0.65%
031402010	Santol	21.3%	17,050	12,465	▴	2.18%
031402011	Wawa	6.2%	4,985	4,716	▴	0.38%
	Total		80,221	65,440	▴	1.41%

=== Climate ===
Climate data for Balagtas, Bulacan
Month	Jan	Feb	Mar	Apr	May	Jun	Jul	Aug	Sep	Oct	Nov	Dec	Year
Mean daily maximum °C (°F)	29 (84)	30 (86)	32 (90)	34 (93)	33 (91)	31 (88)	30 (86)	29 (84)	29 (84)	30 (86)	30 (86)	29 (84)	31 (87)
Mean daily minimum °C (°F)	20 (68)	20 (68)	21 (70)	23 (73)	24 (75)	25 (77)	24 (75)	24 (75)	24 (75)	23 (73)	22 (72)	21 (70)	23 (73)
Average precipitation mm (inches)	7 (0.3)	7 (0.3)	9 (0.4)	21 (0.8)	101 (4.0)	152 (6.0)	188 (7.4)	170 (6.7)	159 (6.3)	115 (4.5)	47 (1.9)	29 (1.1)	1,005 (39.7)
Average rainy days	3.3	3.5	11.1	8.1	18.9	23.5	26.4	25.5	24.5	19.6	10.4	6.4	181.2
Source: Meteoblue

== Demographics ==
Population census of Balagtas
Year	Pop.	±% p.a.
1903	8,000	—
1918	9,875	+1.41%
1939	12,037	+0.95%
1948	8,085	−4.33%
1960	10,280	+2.02%
1970	17,109	+5.22%
1975	21,422	+4.61%
1980	28,654	+5.99%
1990	42,658	+4.06%
1995	49,210	+2.71%
2000	56,945	+3.18%
2007	62,684	+1.33%
2010	65,440	+1.58%
2015	73,929	+2.35%
2020	77,018	+0.87%
2024	80,221	+0.98%
Source: Philippine Statistics Authority

In the 2020 census, the population of Balagtas, Bulacan, was 77,018 people, with a density of 2,700 inhabitants per square kilometer or 7,000 inhabitants per square mile.

== Economy ==
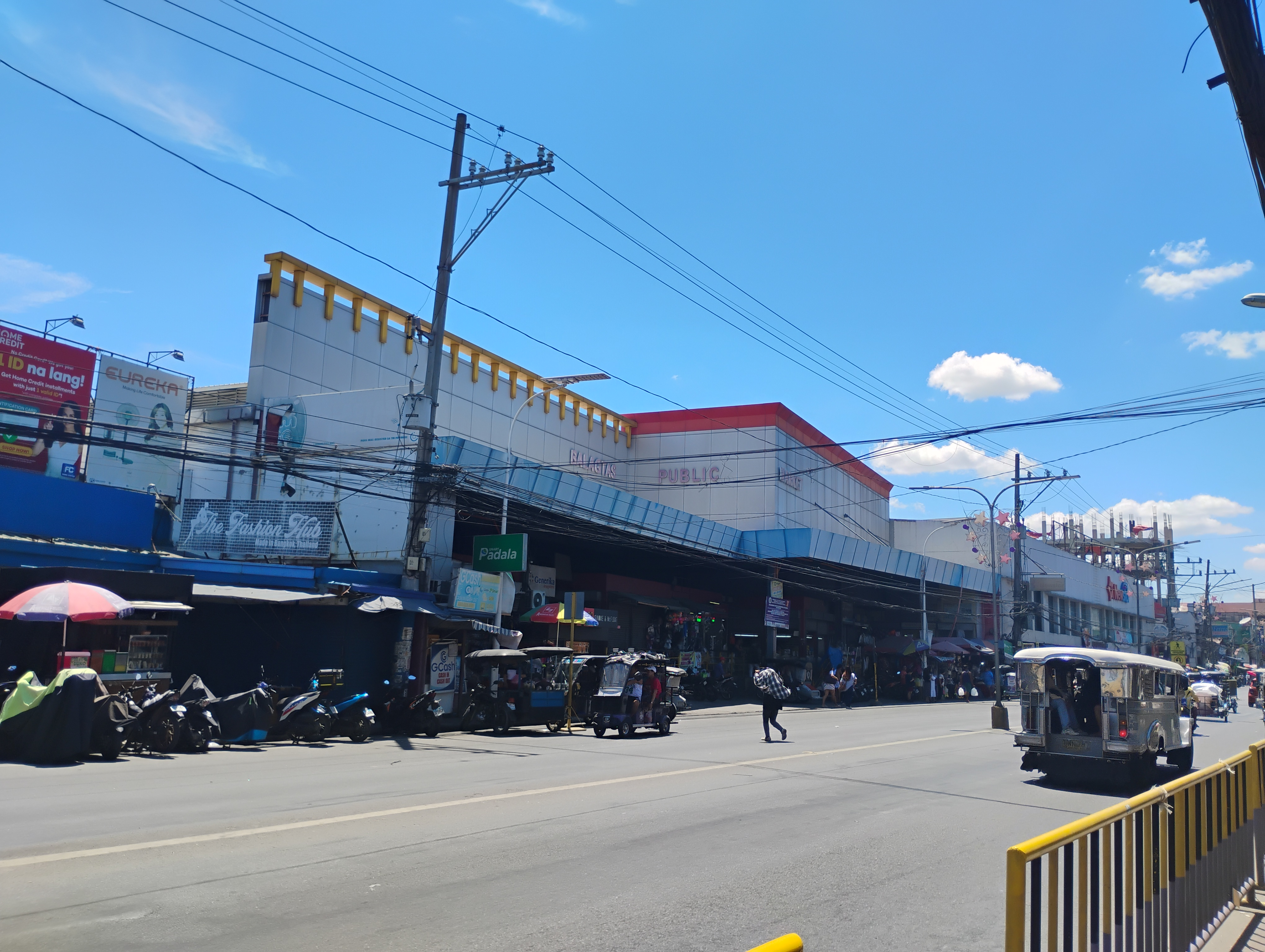
Balagtas Public Market

Poverty incidence of Balagtas (%)

Source: Philippine Statistics Authority

Major Industries

- Ceramics/Pottery
- Furniture
- Garments
- Gifts/Houseware/Decors
- Metalcraft
- Poultry

Major Products

- Furniture/Agricultural Products
- Balot and Penoy Industry
- Recruitment Agency
- Fruit Dealership
- Tilapia
- Tricycle Parts

Future Developments

- Construction of the Balagtas Station of North–South Commuter Railway
- Construction of St. Lawrence of Balagtas Medical Center

== Government ==
=== Local government ===
Former seal of Balagtas, Bulacan

2025-2028 Balagtas, Bulacan Officials
Position	Name	Party
Mayor	Adrian J. Santiago	PFP
Vice Mayor	Mikee Jane P. Gonda	PFP
Councilors	Babby L. Estrella	NUP
Councilors	Ian S. De Guzman	PFP
Councilors	Esmeraldo I. Magbitang Jr.	PFP
Councilors	Charles Louie B. Galvez	NUP
Councilors	Alberto L. Santiago	PFP
Councilors	Jeffrey J. Ventura	PFP
Councilors	Gerald S. Vergara	PFP
Councilors	Gilbert L. Galvez	NUP
Ex Officio Municipal Council Members
ABC President	TBD	Nonpartisan
SK Federation President	TBD	Nonpartisan

== Education ==
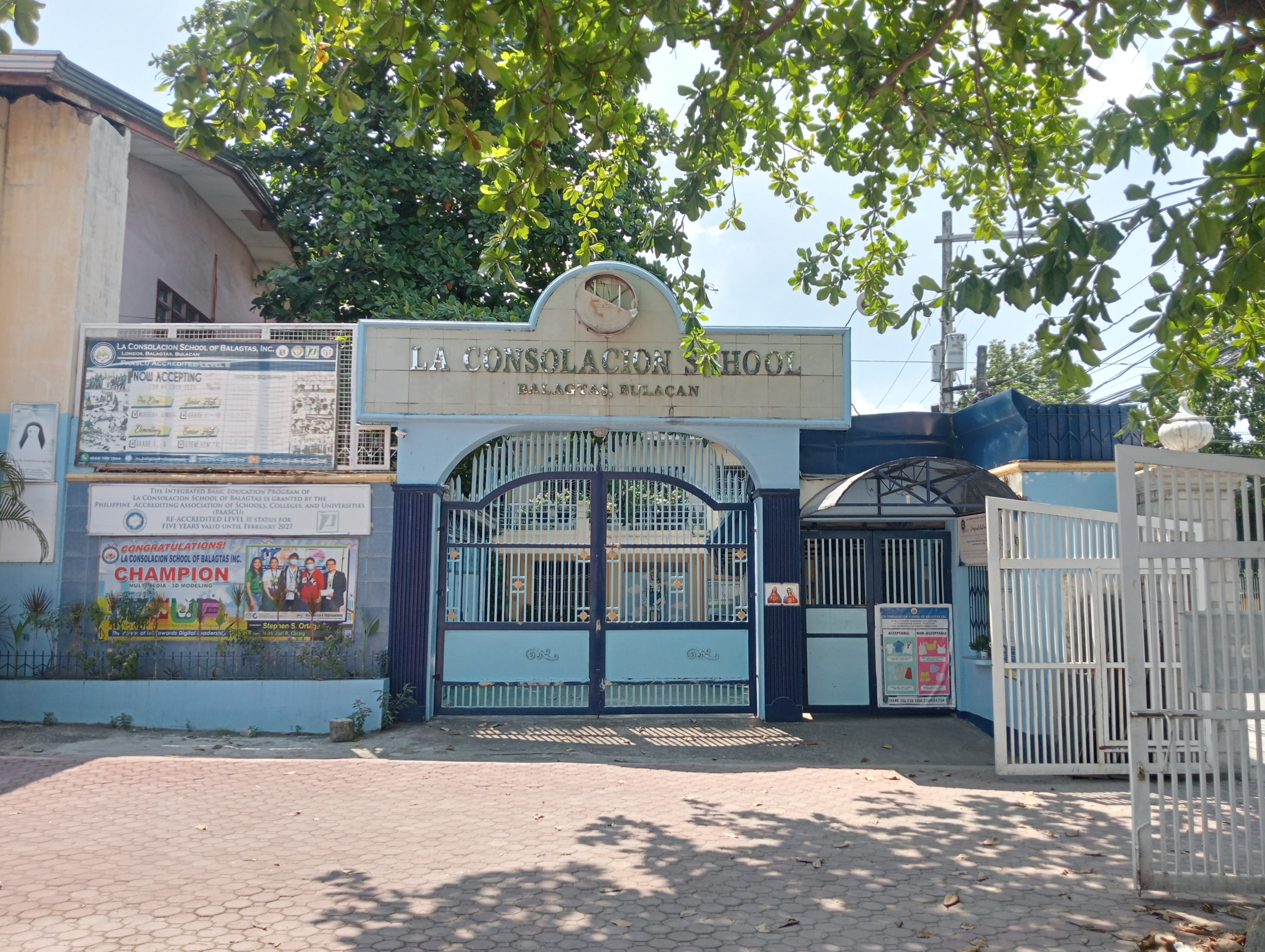
La Consolacion School (Run by the Augustinian Sisters of Our Lady of Consolation)

The Balagtas Schools District Office governs all educational institutions within the municipality. It oversees the management and operations of all private and public, from primary to secondary schools.

=== Primary and elementary schools ===
- A - Z Country Day School
- Balagtas Central School
- Balagtas Heights Elementary School
- Balagtas Montessori School
- Borol 1st Elementary School
- Borol 2nd Elementary School
- Children's Mindware School
- Dalig Elementary School
- Early Values Kiddie Center
- Escuelahan de San Juan Montessori
- Francisco Balagtas Memorial School
- Garden Angels Integrated School
- International Christian Academy
- La Consolacion School
- Longos Elementary School
- M.C. Rivera Elementary School
- Northville VI Elementary School
- Panginay Unida Christian School
- San Juan Elementary School
- Santol Elementary School
- Sulok Elementary School

=== Secondary schools ===
- Balagtas National Agricultural High School
- Balagtas National Agricultural High School - Annex Campus I
- Colegio de Roma
- College of St. Lawrence
- Gat. Francisco Balagtas High School
- Golden Minds Colleges
- Immaculate Conception International Education Systems, Inc.
- Jubilant Youngster Academy

=== Higher educational institutions ===
- Bulacan Agricultural State College - Balagtas Technical Vocational College Campus
- Our Lady of Manaoag Montessori College
- STI College - Balagtas, Bulacan

== Notable personalities ==
- Francisco Balagtas, poetry
- Regine Velasquez, Multi-awarded singer, asia song bird vocal voice, actress and record producer
- Dakila F. Castro, Lawyer

== Gallery ==
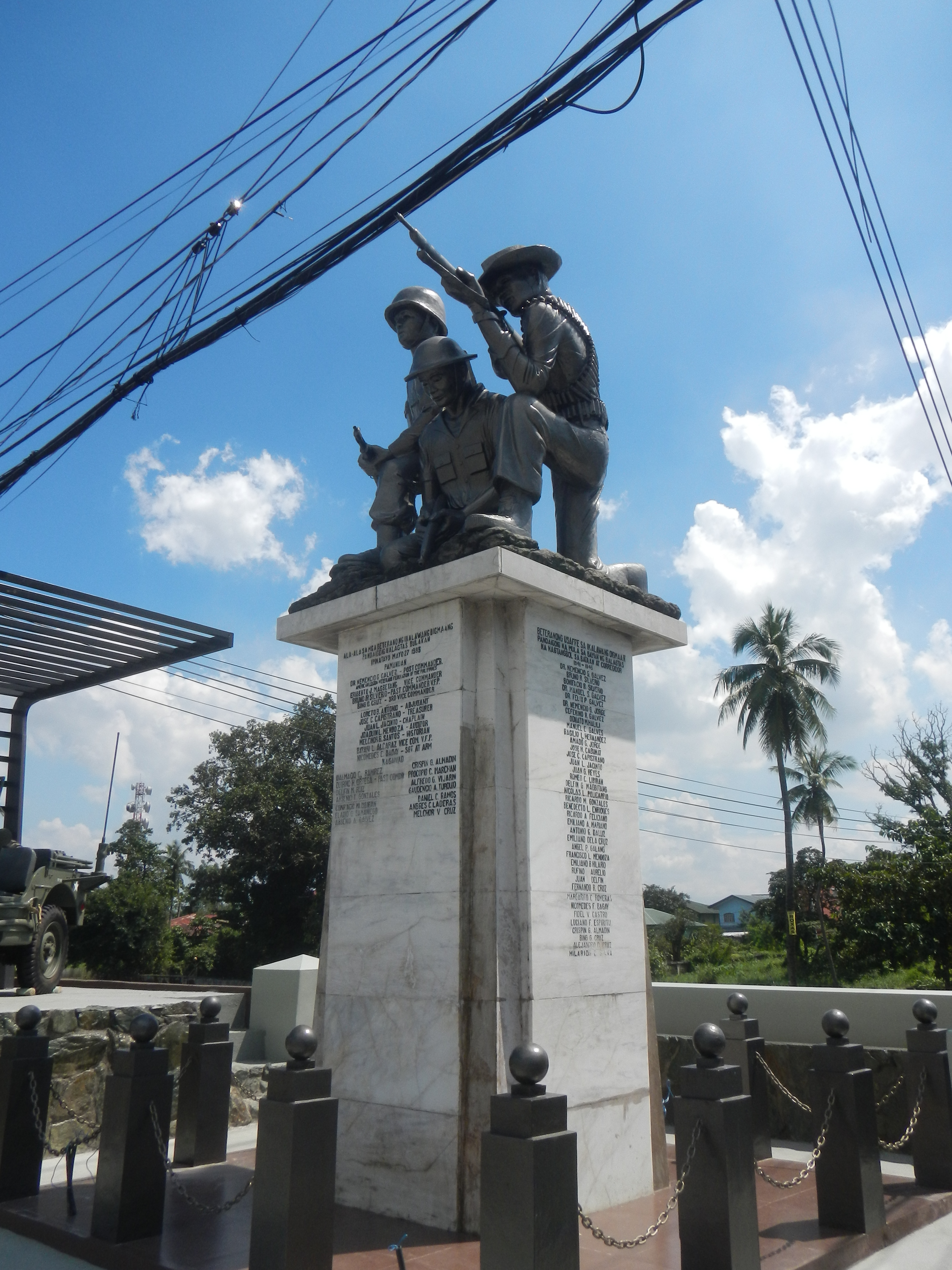
World War 2 USAFFE Veterans of Balagtas Marker (Old Municipal hall building)

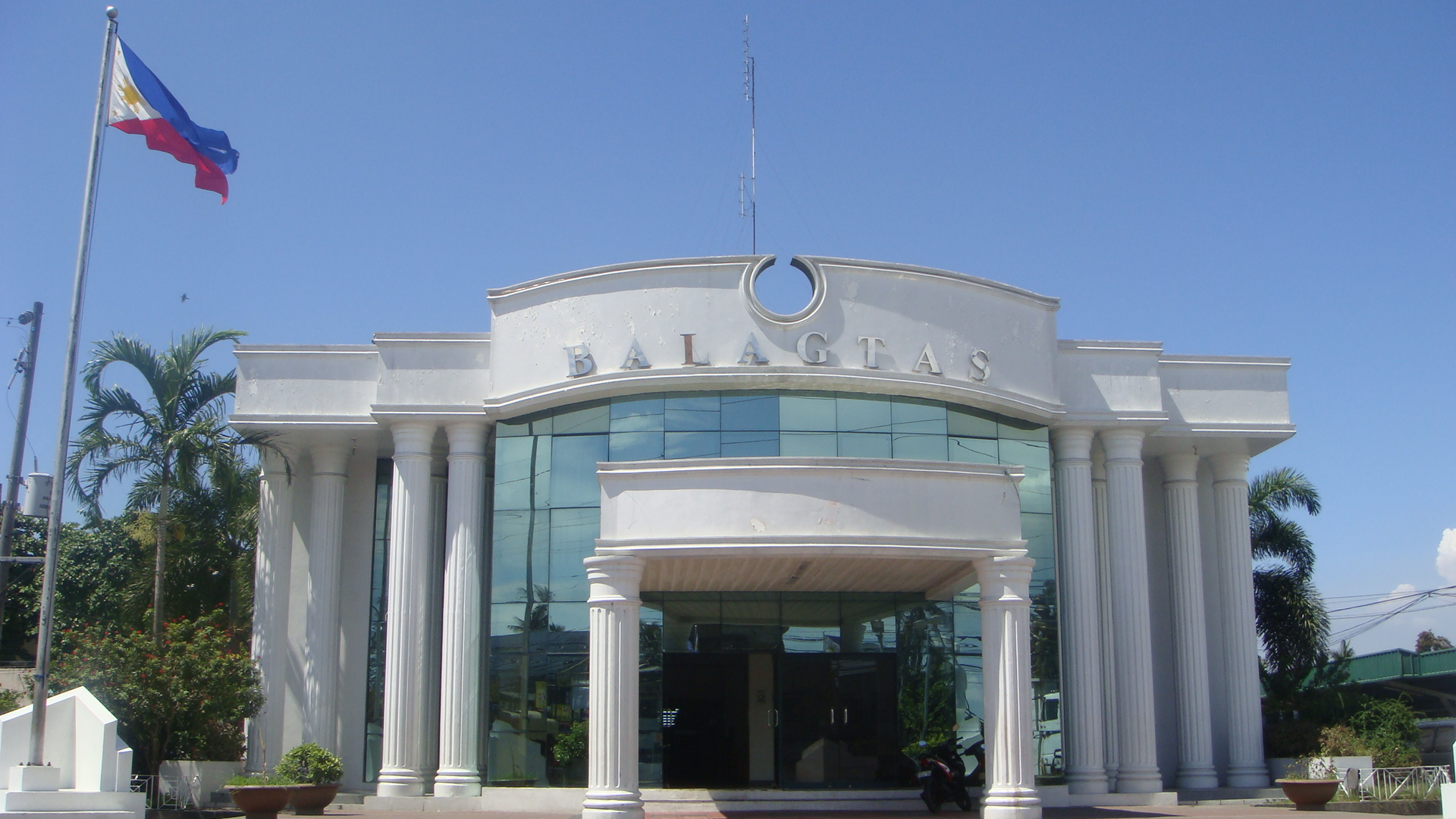
The old Municipal hall building of Balagtas

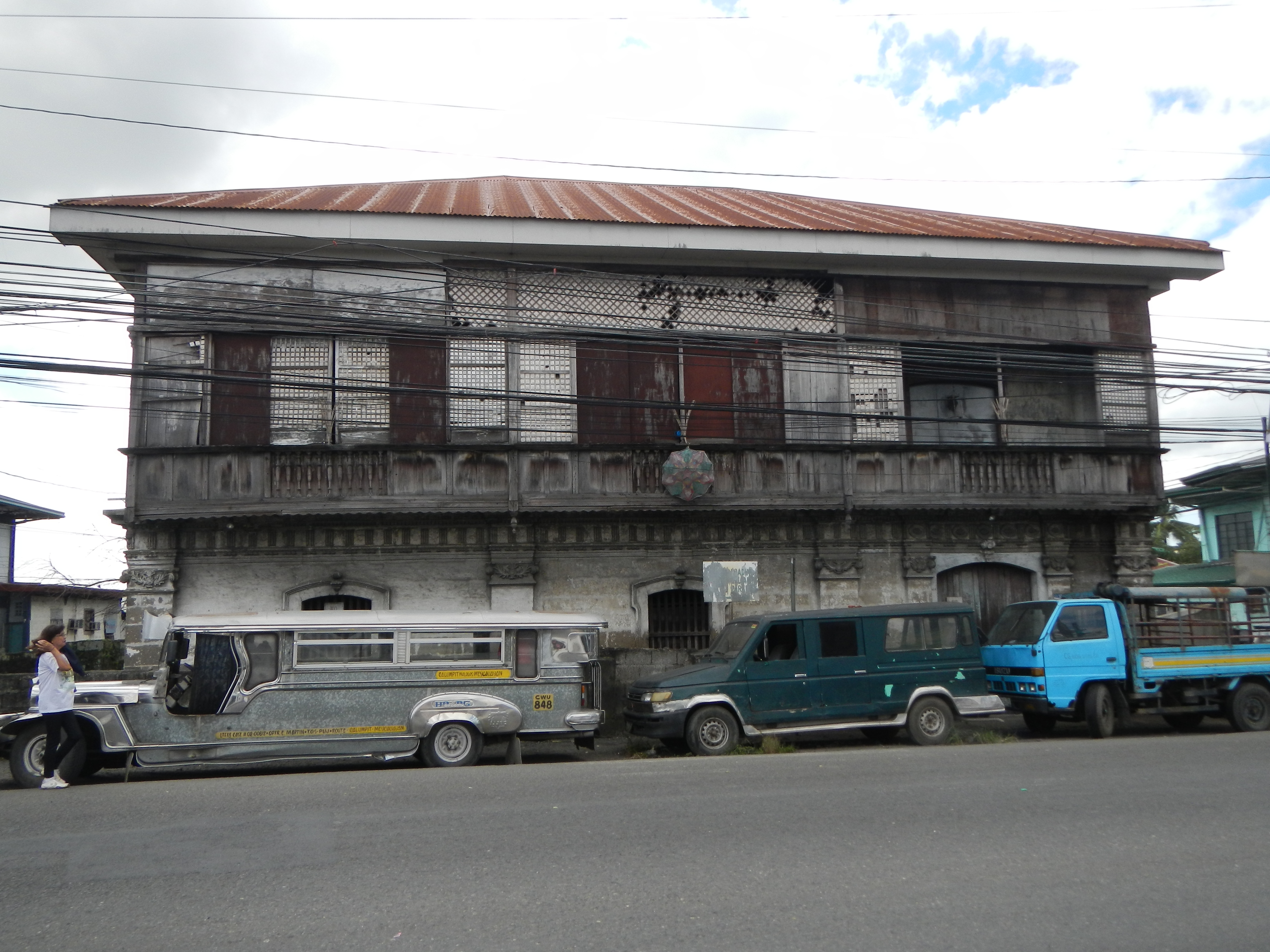
Constantino Bahay na Bato Ancestral House

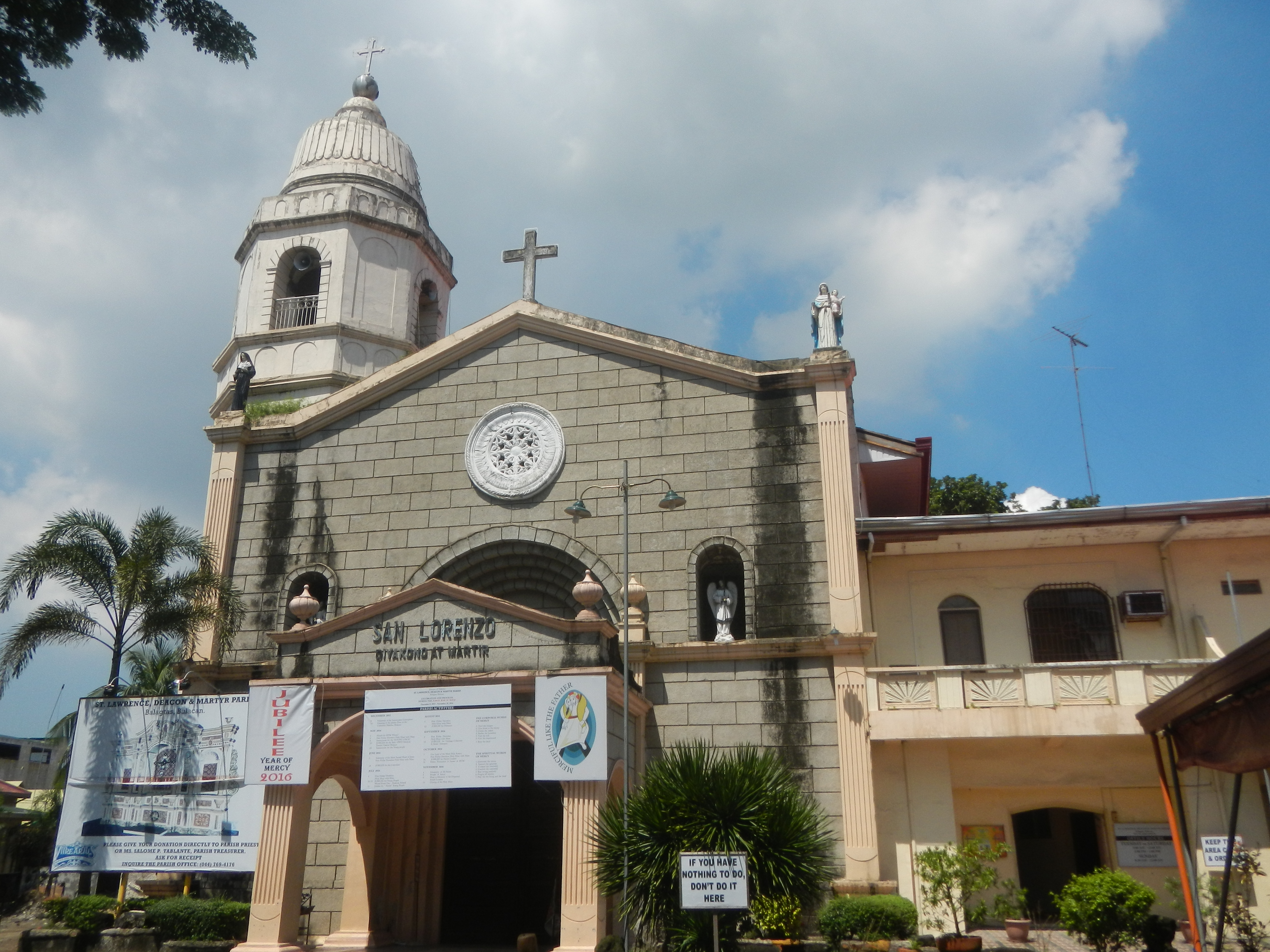
The Parish church of St. Lawrence, Deacon and Martyr (Barangay Wawa)

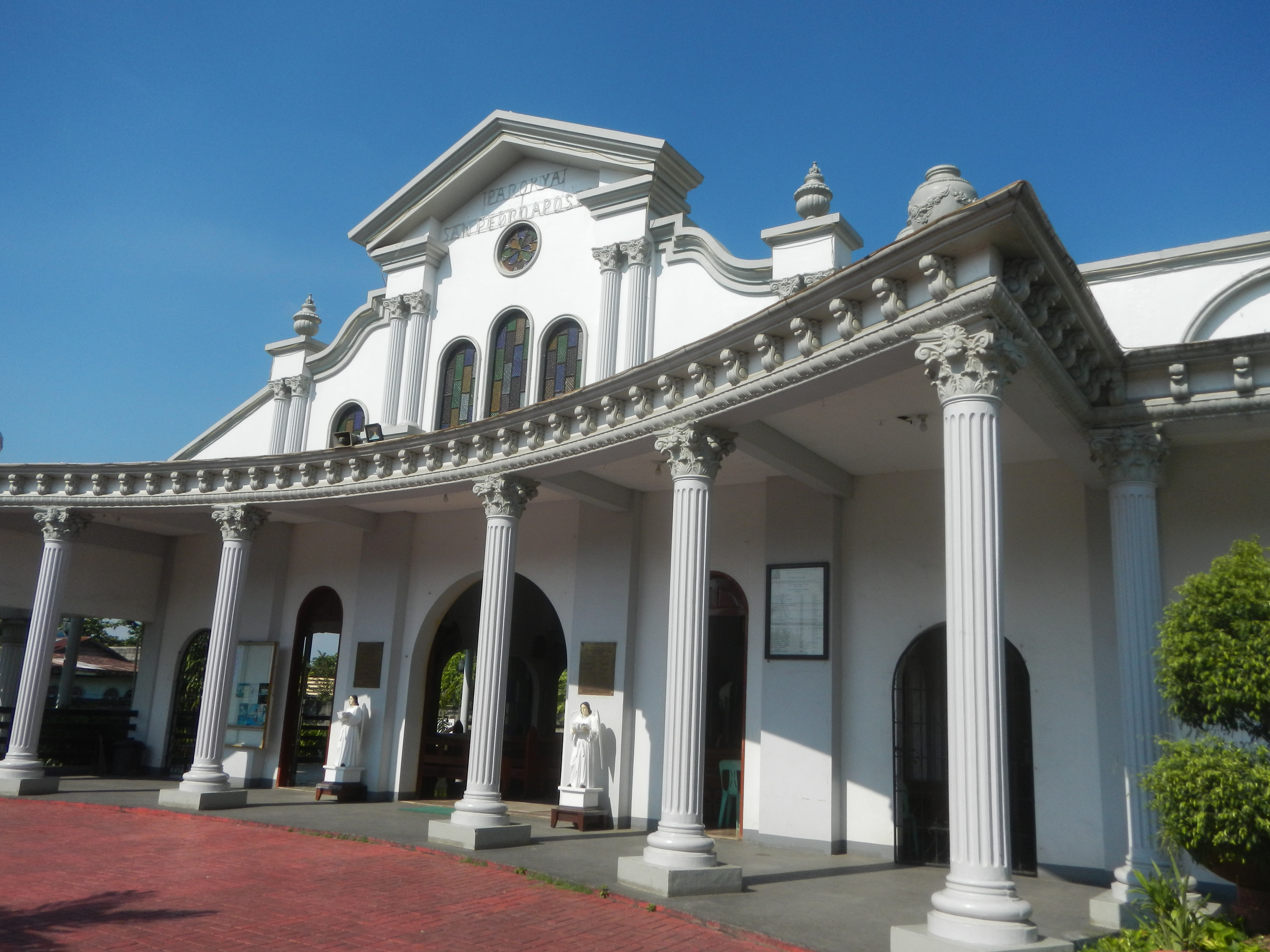
The Parish church of St. Peter the Apostle (Barangay Borol 2nd)

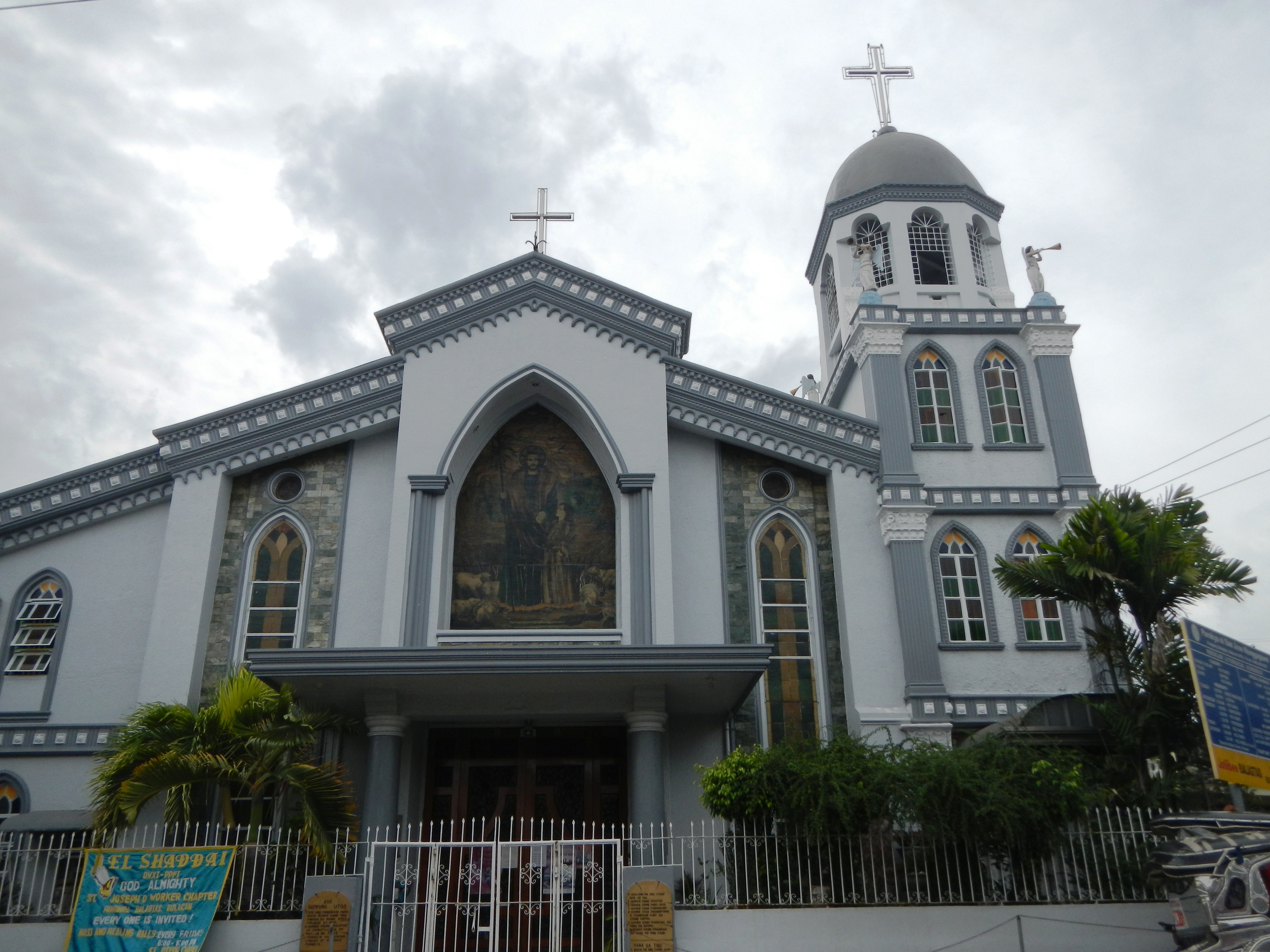
The Parish church of St. Joseph the Worker (Barangay Panginay)

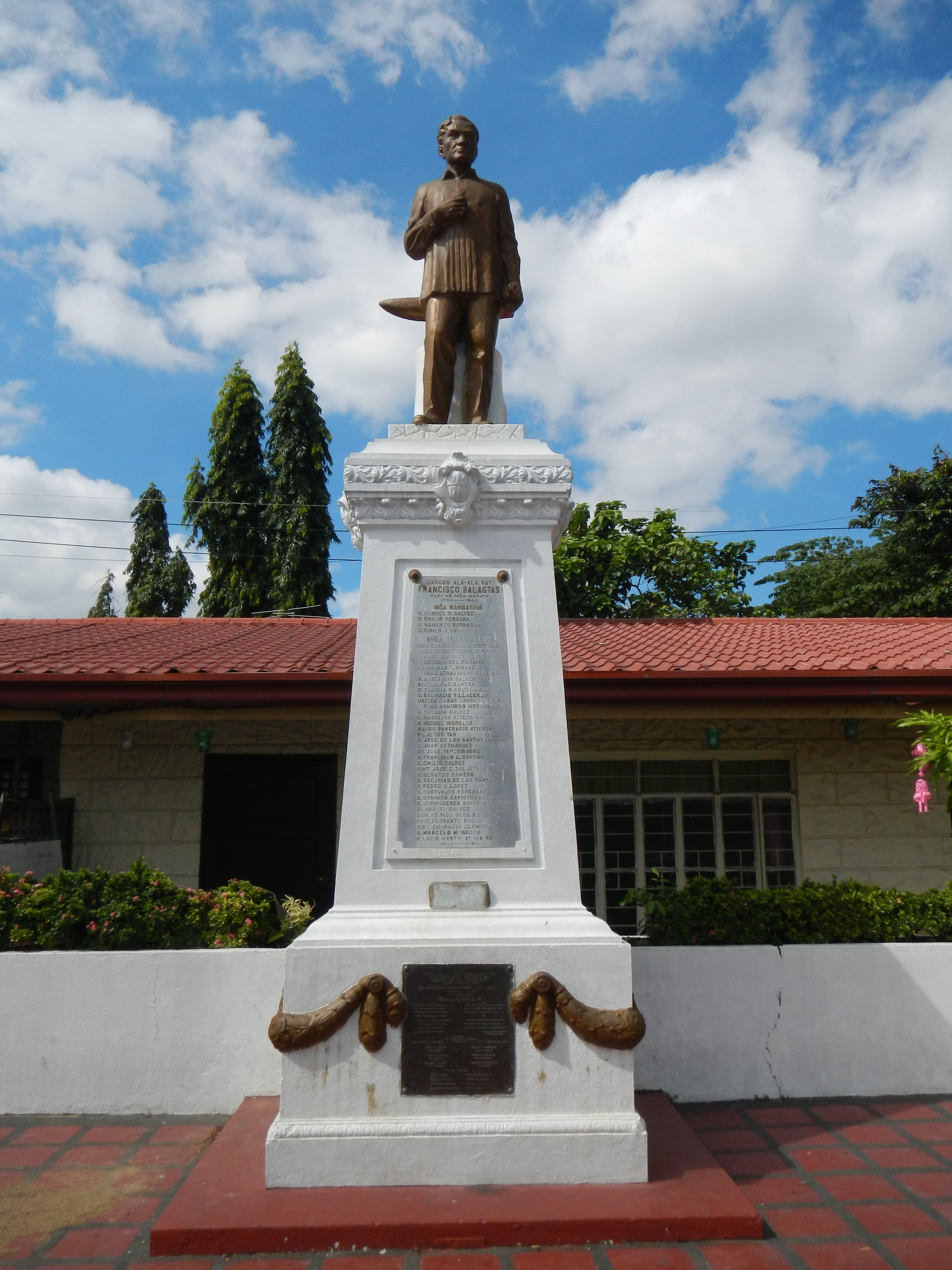
Monument of Francisco Balagtas (Francisco Balagtas Memorial Elementary School)

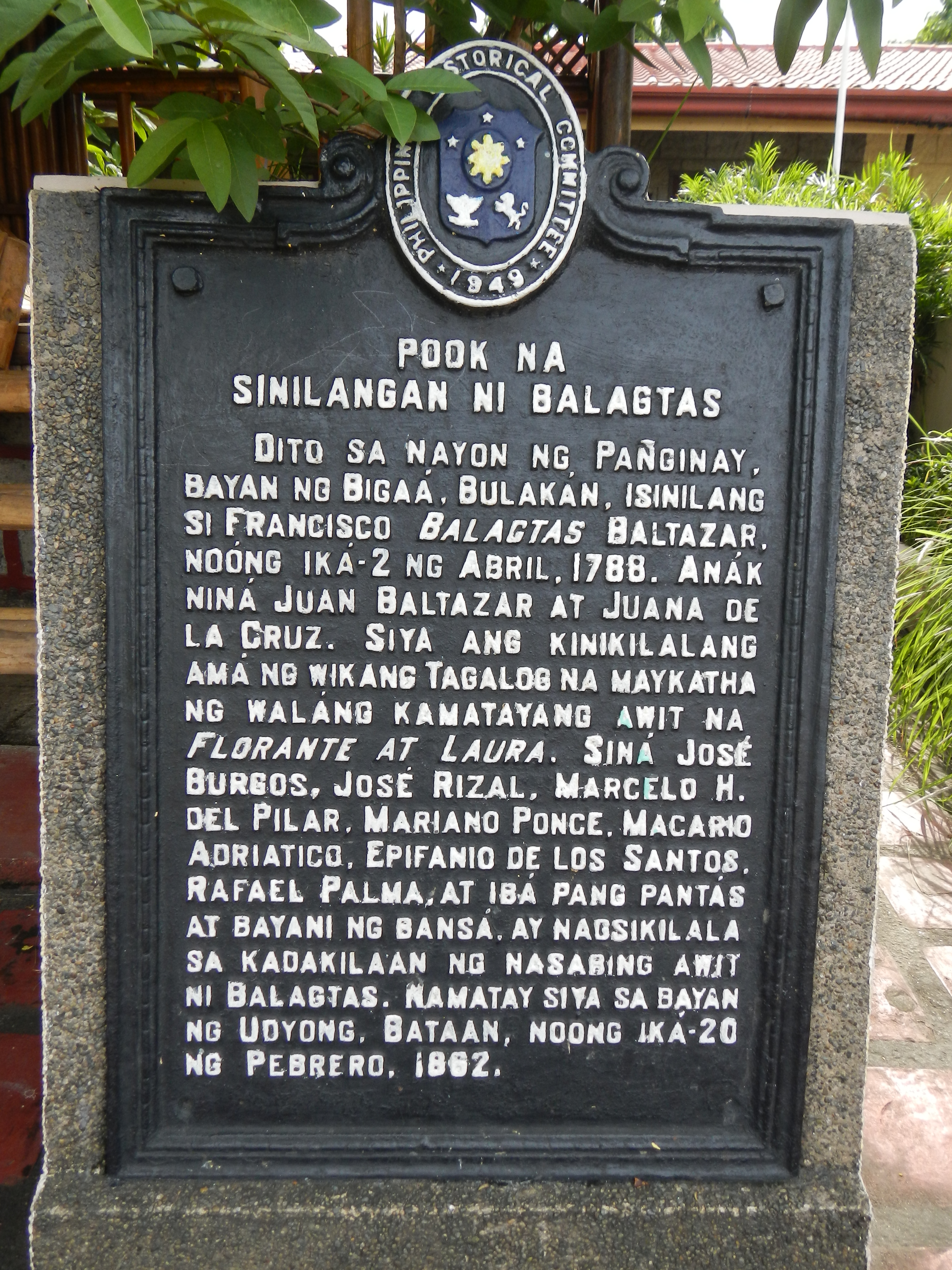
Commemorative marker of Francisco Balagtas' birthplace

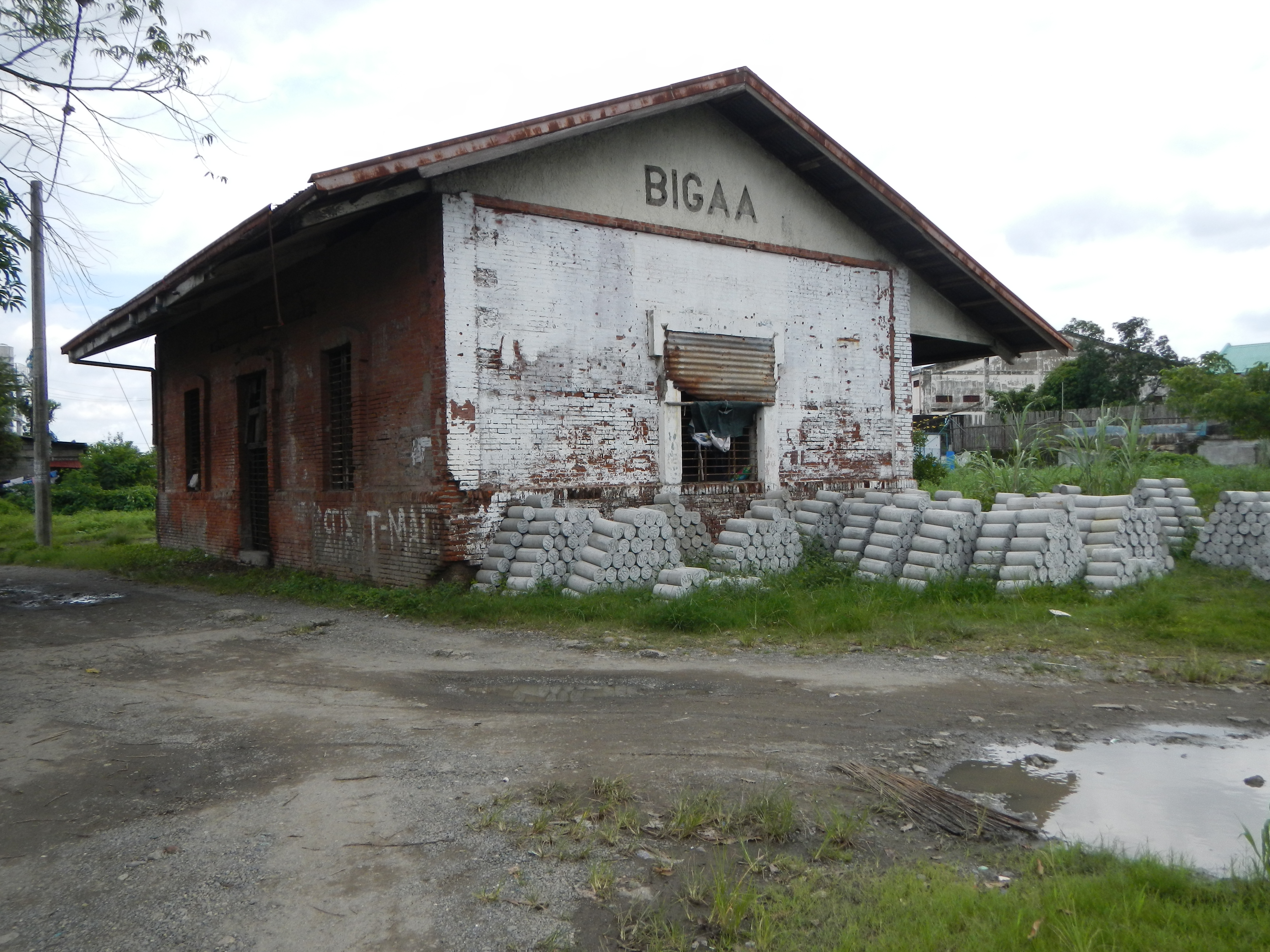
Old Bigaa Train Station

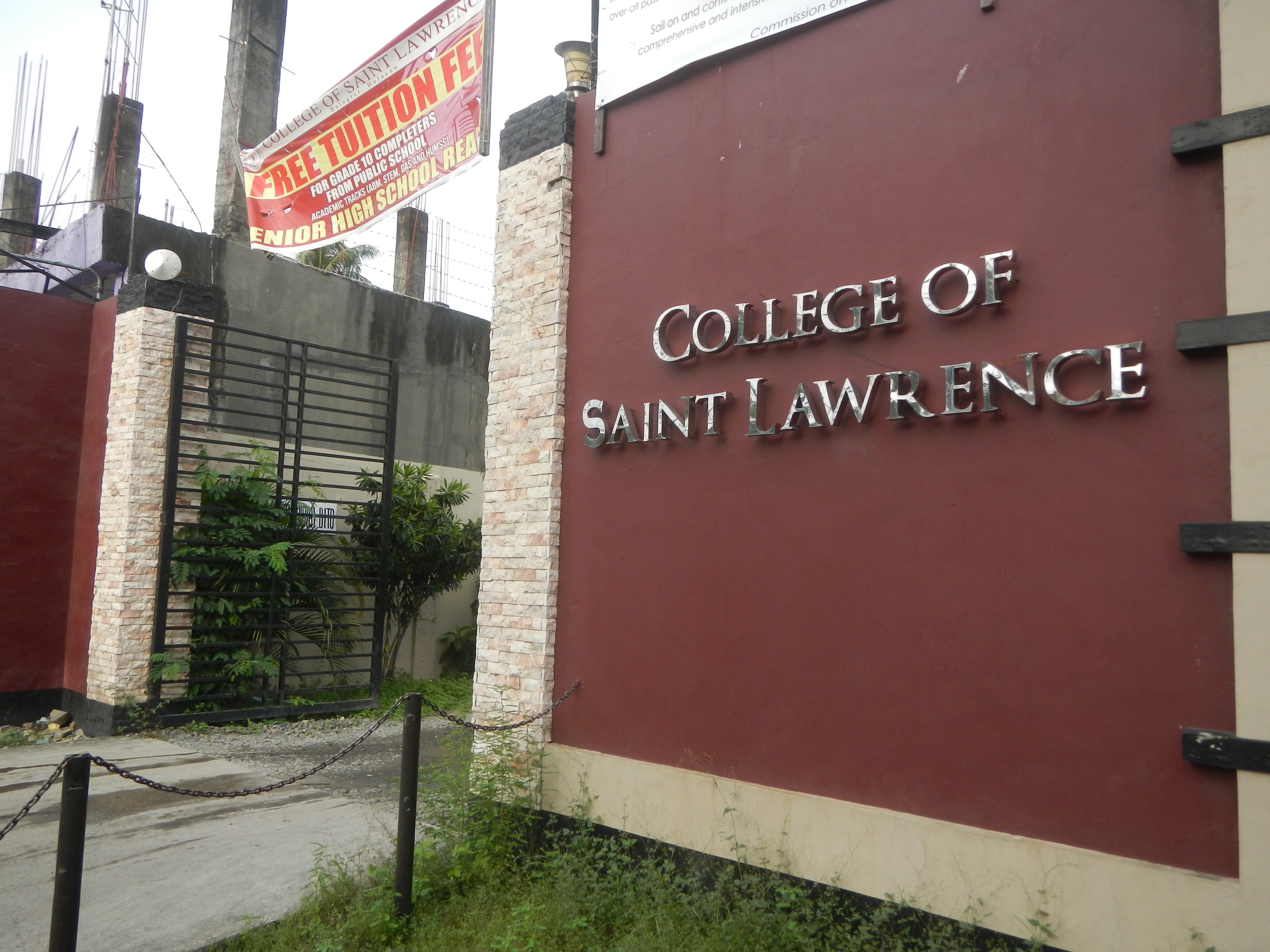
College of Saint Lawrence (Formerly St. Lawrence Academy)

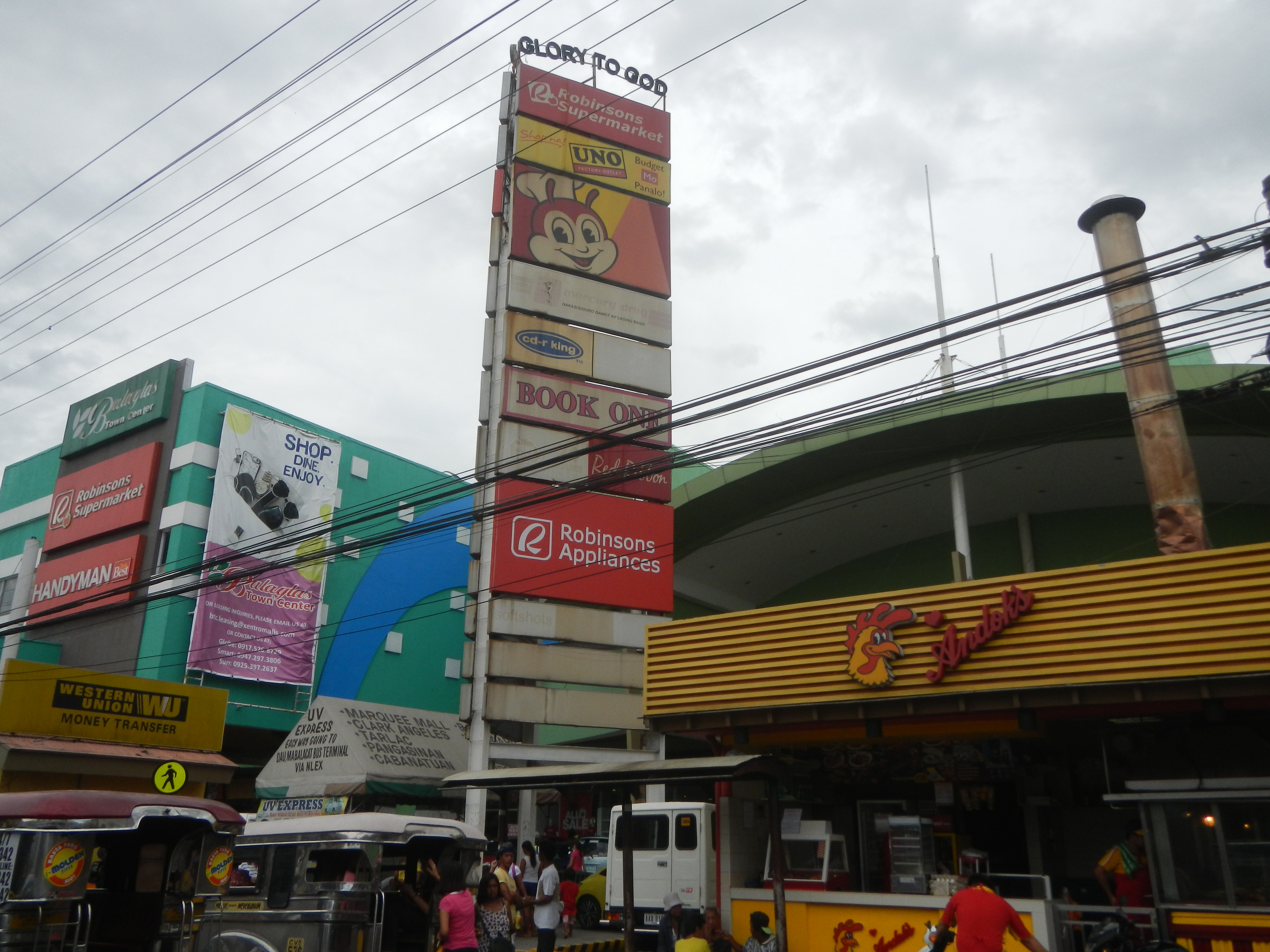
Balagtas Town Center

== See also ==
- List of renamed cities and municipalities in the Philippines
