= Ambrosio Cruz Jr. =

Filipino accountant and politician (born 1947)

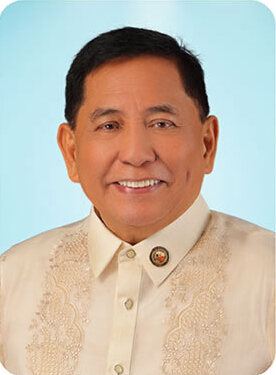
- Official portrait, 2022

Mayor of Guiguinto
- Incumbent
- Assumed office June 30, 2025
- Vice Mayor: Eliseo Santos Jr.
- Preceded by: Agay Cruz
- In office June 30, 2013 – June 30, 2022
- Vice Mayor: Banjo Estrella (2013–2019); Eliseo Santos Jr. (2019–2022)
- Preceded by: Isagani Pascual
- Succeeded by: Agay Cruz
- In office June 30, 1998 – June 30, 2007
- Succeeded by: Isagani Pascual

Member of the House of Representatives from Bulacan's 5th District
- In office June 30, 2022 – June 30, 2025
- Preceded by: District established
- Succeeded by: Agay Cruz

Personal details
- Born: Ambrosio Cruz Cruz Jr. December 16, 1947 (age 78) Malolos, Bulacan, Philippines
- Party: Lakas (until 2009; 2022–present)
- Other political affiliations: PDP–Laban (2021–2022); NUP (2018–2021); Liberal (2009–2012; 2015–2018); PMP (2012–2015); KAMPI (2007–2008)
- Spouse: Prescila Aguilar
- Children: 3, including Agay
- Education: University of the East (BS)
- Occupation: Politician, accountant
- Nickname: Boy Cruz

Ambrosio Cruz Cruz Jr. (born December 16, 1947), popularly known as Boy Cruz, is a Filipino accountant and politician who currently serving as mayor of Guiguinto since 2025, a position he previously served from 2013 to 2022 and from 1998 to 2007. He served as a representative of the 5th District of Bulacan in the House of Representatives of the Philippines from 2022 to 2025.

== Early life and education ==
Ambrosio Cruz Jr., nicknamed "Boy Cruz," was born on December 16, 1947 in Malolos, Bulacan and raised in Guiguinto, Bulacan. He finished accountancy at the University of the East.

== Political career ==
=== Mayor of Guiguinto (1998–2007) ===
In 1998, Cruz began his political career when he was a mayor of Guiguinto for three consecutive terms.

=== 2007 House of Representatives bid ===
In 2007, Cruz ran for congressman of the 2nd district of Bulacan under the Kabalikat ng Malayang Pilipino but he lost to incumbent representative Pedro Pancho.

=== 2010 House of Representatives bid ===
In 2010, Cruz ran again for congressman of the 2nd district of Bulacan under the Liberal Party but he lost again to incumbent representative Pedro Pancho.

=== Mayor of Guiguinto (2013–2022) ===
In 2013, Cruz was elected as the mayor of Guiguinto, a position he held until 2022. During his tenure, he focused on local development, infrastructure, and public services.

=== House of Representatives (2022–2025) ===
In 2022, Cruz was elected as the representative of the 5th district of Bulacan in the House of Representatives of the Philippines, running under the PDP–Laban party. As a congressman, he has prioritized legislation aimed at improving education, healthcare, and economic development in his district.

In July 2022, Cruz switched his political affiliation to Lakas–CMD, joining the party to strengthen his legislative agenda and align with national political developments.

=== Mayor of Guiguinto (2025–present) ===
In 2025, Cruz returned as mayor of Guiguinto after he succeeded his daughter.

== Personal life ==
He comes from a family with a strong political background in the province. Cruz is married to Prescila Aguilar and has three children including Agay Cruz, who currently serves as representative of the 5th district of Bulacan. The Cruz family is well-known in Bulacan for their contributions to local governance and community development.

== Electoral performance ==
=== 2025 ===
2025 Guiguinto mayoral election
Party	Candidate	Votes	%
Lakas	Ambrosio Cruz Jr.	47,775	100
Total votes		47,775	100
Lakas hold			

=== 2022 ===
2022 Philippine House of Representatives elections
Candidate	Party	Votes	%
Ambrosio Cruz Jr.	PDP–Laban	128,065	53.15
Arnel Alcaraz	National Unity Party	112,899	46.85
Total		240,964	100.00
Total votes		260,637	–
Registered voters/turnout		291,581	89.39
PDP–Laban gain			
Source: Commission on Elections

=== 2019 ===
2019 Guiguinto mayoral election
Party	Candidate	Votes	%
NUP	Ambrosio Cruz Jr.	33,139	64.07
PDP–Laban	Banjo Estrella	18,577	35.92
Total votes		51,716	100
NUP hold			

=== 2016 ===
2016 Guiguinto mayoral election
Party	Candidate	Votes	%
Liberal	Ambrosio Cruz Jr.	25,932	53.11
NPC	Gani Pascual	22,891	46.89
Total votes		48,832	100
Liberal hold			

=== 2013 ===
2013 Guiguinto mayoral election
Party	Candidate	Votes	%
PMP	Ambrosio Cruz Jr.	21,800	54.04
Liberal	Gani Pascual	18,540	45.96
Total votes		40,340	100
PMP gain from Liberal			

=== 2010 ===
2010 Philippine House of Representatives elections
Candidate	Party	Votes	%
Pedro Pancho (incumbent)	Lakas–Kampi–CMD	145,133	53.99
Ambrosio Cruz Jr.	Liberal Party	118,489	44.07
Jaime Villafuerte	Independent	5,215	1.94
Total		268,837	100.00
Valid votes		268,837	96.06
Invalid/blank votes		11,017	3.94
Total votes		279,854	100.00
Lakas–Kampi–CMD hold			
Source: Commission on Elections

=== 2007 ===
2007 Philippine House of Representatives elections
Party	Candidate	Votes	%
Lakas	Pedro Pancho	110,829	
KAMPI	Ambrosio Cruz Jr.	102,373	
PMP	Jaime Villafuerte	2,881	
Independent	Crisanta Salvador	842	
Invalid or blank votes			
Total votes			
Lakas hold			
