= Bulacan's 5th congressional district =

House of Representatives of the Philippines legislative district

- Constituency for the House of Representatives of the Philippines
- Boundary of Bulacan's 5th congressional district in Bulacan
- Location of Bulacan within the Philippines
- Province: Bulacan
- Region: Central Luzon
- Population: 486,960 (2020)
- Electorate: 291,581 (2022)
- Major settlements: 4 LGUs: Municipalities; Balagtas; Bocaue; Guiguinto; Pandi
- Area: 119.23 km^{2} (46.03 sq mi)

Current constituency
- Created: 2021
- Representative: Agatha Paula A. Cruz
- Political party: PFP
- Congressional bloc: Majority

Bulacan's 5th congressional district is one of the seven congressional districts of the Philippines in the province of Bulacan. It has been represented in the House of Representatives since 2022. The district consists of municipalities in central Bulacan, namely Balagtas, Bocaue, Guiguinto, and Pandi and does not have any provincial boundaries. It is currently represented in the 20th Congress by Agay Cruz of the Partido Federal ng Pilipinas (PFP).

== Representation history ==
| # | Member | | Term of office | | Congress | Party | Electoral history | Constituent LGUs |
| # | Image | Name | Start | End | Congress | Party | Electoral history | Constituent LGUs |
|---|---|---|---|---|---|---|---|---|
=== Bulacan's 5th district for the House of Representatives of the Philippines ===
District created May 27, 2021 from Bulacan's 2nd district.
| 1 | | Ambrosio C. Cruz Jr. | June 30, 2022 | June 30, 2025 | 19th | PDP–Laban | Elected in 2022. | 2022–present Balagtas, Bocaue, Guiguinto, Pandi |
| 1 | | Ambrosio C. Cruz Jr. | June 30, 2022 | June 30, 2025 | 19th | Lakas | Elected in 2022. | 2022–present Balagtas, Bocaue, Guiguinto, Pandi |
| 2 | | Agatha Paula A. Cruz | June 30, 2025 | Incumbent | 20th | Lakas | Elected in 2025. | 2022–present Balagtas, Bocaue, Guiguinto, Pandi |
| 2 | | Agatha Paula A. Cruz | June 30, 2025 | Incumbent | 20th | PFP | Elected in 2025. | 2022–present Balagtas, Bocaue, Guiguinto, Pandi |

== Election results ==
=== 2025 ===
| Candidate | Party | Votes | % |
|---|---|---|---|
| Agay Cruz | Lakas–CMD | 188,973 | 85.11 |
| Vic Fernando | Independent | 33,051 | 14.89 |
| Total | | 222,024 | 100.00 |
| Registered voters/turnout | | 317,655 | – |
| Lakas–CMD hold | | | |
Source: Commission on Elections

=== 2022 ===
2022 Philippine House of Representatives election in Bulacan's 5th District
| Party | Candidate | Votes | % |
|---|---|---|---|
| PDP–Laban | Ambrosio Cruz Jr. | 128,065 | 53.14 |
| NUP | AAA Alcaraz | 112,899 | 46.85 |
| Total votes | | 240,964 | 100 |
| PDP–Laban win (new seat) | | | |

== See also ==
- Legislative districts of Bulacan
