= Tina Pancho =

Filipino politician (born 1964)

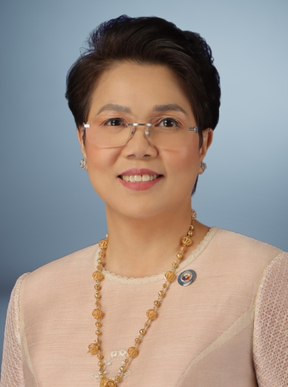
- Official portrait, 2025

Member of the Philippine House of Representatives from Bulacan's 2nd District
- Incumbent
- Assumed office June 30, 2022
- Preceded by: Gavini Pancho

Personal details
- Born: Augustina Dominique Cruz Pancho; August 4, 1964 (age 62) Philippines
- Profession: Politician

Augustina Dominique Cruz Pancho (born August 4, 1964), also known as Tina Pancho or Ditse Tina, is a Filipino politician serving as the representative of Bulacan's 2nd District in the House of Representatives of the Philippines since 2022. She succeeded her brother, Gavini "Apol" Pancho, in the position.

== Background ==
Pancho is nicknamed "Ditse Tina," with "Ditse" meaning "second eldest sister" in Hokkien. She has described the moniker as not only a familial endearment but also a reflection of her approach to public service.

== Legislative Work ==
In the 19th Congress of the Philippines, Pancho has been noted as a principal author of several bills. These include measures on:

- granting incentives for businesses adopting rainwater harvesting technology,
- establishing "Public Schools of the Future in Technology,"
- strengthening the procedure for voter registration and enabling online registration systems.

== Personal life ==
She is the daughter of former Rep. Pedro M. Pancho, and the sister of former Rep. Gavini C. Pancho, both from the 2nd District of Bulacan.
