= Bulacan's 2nd congressional district =

House of Representatives of the Philippines legislative district

- Constituency for the House of Representatives of the Philippines
- Boundary of Bulacan's 2nd congressional district in Bulacan
- Location of Bulacan within the Philippines
- Province: Bulacan
- Region: Central Luzon
- Population: 360,101 (2020)
- Electorate: 224,922 (2022)
- Major settlements: 3 LGUs: City; Baliwag; Municipalities; Bustos; Plaridel
- Area: 266.71 km^{2} (102.98 sq mi)

Current constituency
- Created: 1907
- Representative: Augustina Dominique C. Pancho
- Political party: NUP
- Congressional bloc: Majority

Bulacan's 2nd congressional district is one of the seven congressional districts of the Philippines in the province of Bulacan. It has been represented in the House of Representatives of the Philippines since 1916 and earlier in the Philippine Assembly from 1907 to 1916. The district consists of the city of Baliwag and the municipalities of Bustos and Plaridel. It is currently represented in the 20th Congress by Tina Pancho of the National Unity Party (NUP).

Prior to its second dissolution in 1972, the second district encompassed the eastern Bulacan municipalities of Angat, Baliuag (Baliwag), Bocaue, Marilao, Meycauayan, Norzagaray, Obando, San Ildefonso, San Jose del Monte, San Miguel, San Rafael, Santa Maria, and Valenzuela (formerly Polo). It also included the municipality of Polo, which last consisted of the northern portion of the present-day Valenzuela, until it was merged with Valenzuela in 1963. Following the restoration of the Congress in 1987, the district was reconfigured to encompass Balagtas, Baliwag, Bocaue, Bustos, Guiguinto, Pandi, and Plaridel, amid the addition of two districts for Bulacan. Balagtas, Bocaue, Guiguinto, and Pandi were later excised from the district to form the fifth district effective 2022, leaving it with three in its current jurisdiction.

== Representation history ==
#	Image	Member	Term of office		Legislature	Party	Electoral history	Constituent LGUs
#	Image	Member	Start	End	Legislature	Party	Electoral history	Constituent LGUs
=== Bulacan's 2nd district for the Philippine Assembly ===
District created January 9, 1907.
1		León María Guerrero	October 16, 1907	October 16, 1909	1st	Nacionalista	Elected in 1907.	1907–1909; Angat, Baliuag, Meycauayan, Obando, Polo, San Miguel, San Rafael, Santa Maria
2		Mariano Ponce	October 16, 1909	October 16, 1912	2nd	Nacionalista	Elected in 1909.	1909–1912; Angat, Baliuag, Meycauayan, Norzagaray, Obando, Polo, San Ildefonso, San Miguel, San Rafael, Santa Maria
3		Ceferino de León	October 16, 1912	October 16, 1916	3rd	Nacionalista	Elected in 1912.	1909–1912; Angat, Baliuag, Meycauayan, Norzagaray, Obando, Polo, San Ildefonso, San Miguel, San Rafael, Santa Maria
=== Bulacan's 2nd district for the House of Representatives of the Philippine Islands ===
4		Ricardo González Lloret	October 16, 1916	June 3, 1919	4th	Nacionalista	Elected in 1916.	1916–1919; Angat, Baliuag, Marilao, Meycauayan, Norzagaray, Obando, Polo, San Ildefonso, San Miguel, San Rafael, Santa Maria
5		Cirilo B. Santos	June 3, 1919	June 6, 1922	5th	Nacionalista	Elected in 1919.	1919–1935; Angat, Baliuag, Marilao, Meycauayan, Norzagaray, Obando, Polo, San Ildefonso, San Jose del Monte, San Miguel, San Rafael, Santa Maria
6		Norberto Manikis	June 6, 1922	June 2, 1925	6th	Demócrata	Elected in 1922.	1919–1935; Angat, Baliuag, Marilao, Meycauayan, Norzagaray, Obando, Polo, San Ildefonso, San Jose del Monte, San Miguel, San Rafael, Santa Maria
7		José R. Serapio	June 2, 1925	June 5, 1928	7th	Demócrata	Elected in 1925.	1919–1935; Angat, Baliuag, Marilao, Meycauayan, Norzagaray, Obando, Polo, San Ildefonso, San Jose del Monte, San Miguel, San Rafael, Santa Maria
(5)		Cirilo B. Santos	June 5, 1928	June 2, 1931	8th	Nacionalista; Consolidado	Elected in 1928.	1919–1935; Angat, Baliuag, Marilao, Meycauayan, Norzagaray, Obando, Polo, San Ildefonso, San Jose del Monte, San Miguel, San Rafael, Santa Maria
8		José de León Jr.	June 2, 1931	June 5, 1934	9th	Nacionalista; Consolidado	Elected in 1931.	1919–1935; Angat, Baliuag, Marilao, Meycauayan, Norzagaray, Obando, Polo, San Ildefonso, San Jose del Monte, San Miguel, San Rafael, Santa Maria
9		Pablo C. Payaual	June 5, 1934	September 16, 1935	10th	Nacionalista; Democrático	Elected in 1934.	1919–1935; Angat, Baliuag, Marilao, Meycauayan, Norzagaray, Obando, Polo, San Ildefonso, San Jose del Monte, San Miguel, San Rafael, Santa Maria
#	Image	Member	Term of office		National Assembly	Party	Electoral history	Constituent LGUs
#	Image	Member	Start	End	National Assembly	Party	Electoral history	Constituent LGUs
=== Bulacan's 2nd district for the National Assembly (Commonwealth of the Philippines) ===
10		Antonio Villarama	September 16, 1935	December 30, 1941	1st	Nacionalista; Democrático	Elected in 1935.	1935–1941; Angat, Baliuag, Marilao, Meycauayan, Norzagaray, Obando, Polo, San Ildefonso, San Jose del Monte, San Miguel, San Rafael, Santa Maria
10		Antonio Villarama	September 16, 1935	December 30, 1941	2nd	Nacionalista	Re-elected in 1938.	1935–1941; Angat, Baliuag, Marilao, Meycauayan, Norzagaray, Obando, Polo, San Ildefonso, San Jose del Monte, San Miguel, San Rafael, Santa Maria
District dissolved into the two-seat Bulacan's at-large district for the National Assembly (Second Philippine Republic).
#	Image	Member	Term of office		Common wealth Congress	Party	Electoral history	Constituent LGUs
#	Image	Member	Start	End	Common wealth Congress	Party	Electoral history	Constituent LGUs
=== Bulacan's 2nd district for the House of Representatives of the Commonwealth of the Philippines ===
District re-created May 24, 1945.
(10)		Antonio Villarama	June 11, 1945	May 25, 1946	1st	Nacionalista	Re-elected in 1941.	1945–1946; Angat, Baliuag, Marilao, Meycauayan, Norzagaray, Obando, Polo, San Ildefonso, San Jose del Monte, San Miguel, San Rafael, Santa Maria
#	Image	Member	Term of office		Congress	Party	Electoral history	Constituent LGUs
#	Image	Member	Start	End	Congress	Party	Electoral history	Constituent LGUs
=== Bulacan's 2nd district for the House of Representatives of the Philippines ===
11		Alejo Santos	May 25, 1946	December 30, 1953	1st	Democratic Alliance	Elected in 1946. Oath of office deferred due to electoral protests against Democratic Alliance candidates.	1946–1961; Angat, Baliuag, Marilao, Meycauayan, Norzagaray, Obando, Polo, San Ildefonso, San Jose del Monte, San Miguel, San Rafael, Santa Maria
11		Alejo Santos	May 25, 1946	December 30, 1953	2nd	Nacionalista	Re-elected in 1949.	1946–1961; Angat, Baliuag, Marilao, Meycauayan, Norzagaray, Obando, Polo, San Ildefonso, San Jose del Monte, San Miguel, San Rafael, Santa Maria
12		Rogaciano Mercado	December 30, 1953	September 23, 1972	3rd	Nacionalista	Elected in 1953.	1946–1961; Angat, Baliuag, Marilao, Meycauayan, Norzagaray, Obando, Polo, San Ildefonso, San Jose del Monte, San Miguel, San Rafael, Santa Maria
12		Rogaciano Mercado	December 30, 1953	September 23, 1972	4th	Nacionalista	Re-elected in 1957.	1946–1961; Angat, Baliuag, Marilao, Meycauayan, Norzagaray, Obando, Polo, San Ildefonso, San Jose del Monte, San Miguel, San Rafael, Santa Maria
12		Rogaciano Mercado	December 30, 1953	September 23, 1972	5th	Nacionalista	Re-elected in 1961.	1961–1965; Angat, Baliuag, Marilao, Meycauayan, Norzagaray, Obando, Polo, San Ildefonso, San Jose del Monte, San Miguel, San Rafael, Santa Maria, Valenzuela
12		Rogaciano Mercado	December 30, 1953	September 23, 1972	6th	Nacionalista	Re-elected in 1965.	1965–1972; Angat, Baliuag, Marilao, Meycauayan, Norzagaray, Obando, San Ildefonso, San Jose del Monte, San Miguel, San Rafael, Santa Maria, Valenzuela
12		Rogaciano Mercado	December 30, 1953	September 23, 1972	7th	Nacionalista	Re-elected in 1969. Removed from office after imposition of martial law.	1965–1972; Angat, Baliuag, Marilao, Meycauayan, Norzagaray, Obando, San Ildefonso, San Jose del Monte, San Miguel, San Rafael, Santa Maria, Valenzuela
District dissolved into the sixteen-seat Region III's at-large district for the Interim Batasang Pambansa, followed by the four-seat Bulacan's at-large district for the Regular Batasang Pambansa.
=== Bulacan's 2nd district for the House of Representatives of the Philippines ===
District re-created February 2, 1987.
13		Vicente C. Rivera Jr.	June 30, 1987	June 30, 1992	8th	Liberal	Elected in 1987.	1987–2022; Balagtas, Baliwag, Bocaue, Bustos, Guiguinto, Pandi, Plaridel
14		Pedro Pancho	June 30, 1992	June 30, 2001	9th	Lakas	Elected in 1992.	1987–2022; Balagtas, Baliwag, Bocaue, Bustos, Guiguinto, Pandi, Plaridel
14		Pedro Pancho	June 30, 1992	June 30, 2001	10th	Lakas	Re-elected in 1995.	1987–2022; Balagtas, Baliwag, Bocaue, Bustos, Guiguinto, Pandi, Plaridel
14		Pedro Pancho	June 30, 1992	June 30, 2001	11th	Lakas	Re-elected in 1998.	1987–2022; Balagtas, Baliwag, Bocaue, Bustos, Guiguinto, Pandi, Plaridel
15		Wilfrido B. Villarama	June 30, 2001	June 30, 2004	12th	Aksyon	Elected in 2001.	1987–2022; Balagtas, Baliwag, Bocaue, Bustos, Guiguinto, Pandi, Plaridel
(14)		Pedro Pancho	June 30, 2004	June 30, 2013	13th	Lakas	Elected in 2004.	1987–2022; Balagtas, Baliwag, Bocaue, Bustos, Guiguinto, Pandi, Plaridel
(14)		Pedro Pancho	June 30, 2004	June 30, 2013	14th	Lakas	Re-elected in 2007.	1987–2022; Balagtas, Baliwag, Bocaue, Bustos, Guiguinto, Pandi, Plaridel
(14)		Pedro Pancho	June 30, 2004	June 30, 2013	15th	NUP	Re-elected in 2010.	1987–2022; Balagtas, Baliwag, Bocaue, Bustos, Guiguinto, Pandi, Plaridel
16		Gavini C. Pancho	June 30, 2013	June 30, 2022	16th	NUP	Elected in 2013.	1987–2022; Balagtas, Baliwag, Bocaue, Bustos, Guiguinto, Pandi, Plaridel
16		Gavini C. Pancho	June 30, 2013	June 30, 2022	17th	NUP	Re-elected in 2016.	1987–2022; Balagtas, Baliwag, Bocaue, Bustos, Guiguinto, Pandi, Plaridel
16		Gavini C. Pancho	June 30, 2013	June 30, 2022	18th	NUP	Re-elected in 2019.	1987–2022; Balagtas, Baliwag, Bocaue, Bustos, Guiguinto, Pandi, Plaridel
17		Augustina Dominique C. Pancho	June 30, 2022	Incumbent	19th	NUP	Elected in 2022.	2022–present Baliwag, Bustos, Plaridel
17		Augustina Dominique C. Pancho	June 30, 2022	Incumbent	20th	NUP	Re-elected in 2025.	2022–present Baliwag, Bustos, Plaridel

== Election results ==
=== 2025 ===
2025 Philippine House of Representatives election in Bulacan's 2nd District
Party	Candidate	Votes	%
NUP	Ditse Tina Pancho	167,236	94.25
Independent	Jimmy Villafuerte	10,195	5.75
Total votes		177,431	100
NUP hold			

=== 2022 ===
2022 Philippine House of Representatives election in Bulacan's 2nd District
Party	Candidate	Votes	%
NUP	Ditse Tina Pancho	137,276	80.63
NPC	FB Bermudez	24,936	14.64
Independent	Jimmy Villafuerte	4,746	2.78
Independent	Tony Deborja	3,277	1.92
Total votes		170,235	100
NUP hold			

=== 2019 ===
2019 Philippine House of Representatives elections
Party	Candidate	Votes	%
NUP	Apol Pancho	287,118	93.16
Independent	Jimmy Villafuerte	11,900	3.86
Independent	Raffy Avila	9,178	2.97
Total votes		308,196	100
NUP hold			

=== 2016 ===
2016 Philippine House of Representatives elections
Party	Candidate	Votes	%
NUP	Apol Pancho	266,647	
Independent	Jaime Villafuerte	11,609	
KBL	Louie Angeles	3,587	
Invalid or blank votes		49,234	
Total votes		331,077	
NUP hold			

=== 2013 ===
2013 Philippine House of Representatives elections
Party	Candidate	Votes	%
NUP	Gavini Pancho	143,705	54.33
Liberal	Pedrito Canisio Mendoza	88,285	33.38
Independent	Jimmy Villafuerte	5,092	1.93
Independent	Joseph Cristobal	2,274	0.86
PDP–Laban	Antonio Deborja	729	0.28
Margin of victory		55,420	20.95%
Invalid or blank votes		24,396	9.22
Total votes		264,481	100.00
NUP hold			

=== 2010 ===
2010 Philippine House of Representatives elections
Party	Candidate	Votes	%
Lakas–Kampi	Pedro Pancho	145,133	53.99
Liberal	Ambrosio Cruz Jr.	118,489	44.07
Independent	Jimmy Villafuerte	5,215	1.94
Valid ballots		268,837	96.06
Invalid or blank votes		11,017	3.94
Total votes		279,854	100.00
Lakas–Kampi hold			

=== 2007 ===
2007 Philippine House of Representatives elections
Party	Candidate	Votes	%
Lakas	Pedro Pancho	110,829	
KAMPI	Ambrosio Cruz Jr.	102,373	
PMP	Jaime Villafuerte	2,881	
Independent	Crisanta Salvador	842	
Invalid or blank votes			
Total votes			
Lakas hold			

== See also ==
- Legislative districts of Bulacan
