= Pedro Pancho =

Filipino politician

- Official portrait, 2010

Member of the Philippine House of Representatives from Bulacan's 2nd congressional district
- In office June 30, 2004 – June 30, 2013
- Preceded by: Wilfrido Villarama
- Succeeded by: Gavini Pancho
- In office June 30, 1992 – June 30, 2001
- Preceded by: Vicente Rivera Jr.
- Succeeded by: Wilfrido Villarama

Personal details
- Born: Pedro Matias Pancho; July 2, 1934 Philippine Commonwealth
- Died: September 21, 2023 (aged 89) Philippines
- Party: NUP (2011–2023)
- Other political affiliations: Lakas (1991–2011)
- Spouse: Norma Cruz
- Children: 7 (incl. Gavini and Augustina Dominique)
- Profession: Politician

Pedro Matias Pancho (July 2, 1934 – September 21, 2023) was a Filipino politician. He has been elected to six terms as a Member of the House of Representatives of the Philippines, representing the 2nd District of Bulacan from 1992 to 2001 and from 2004 to 2013.

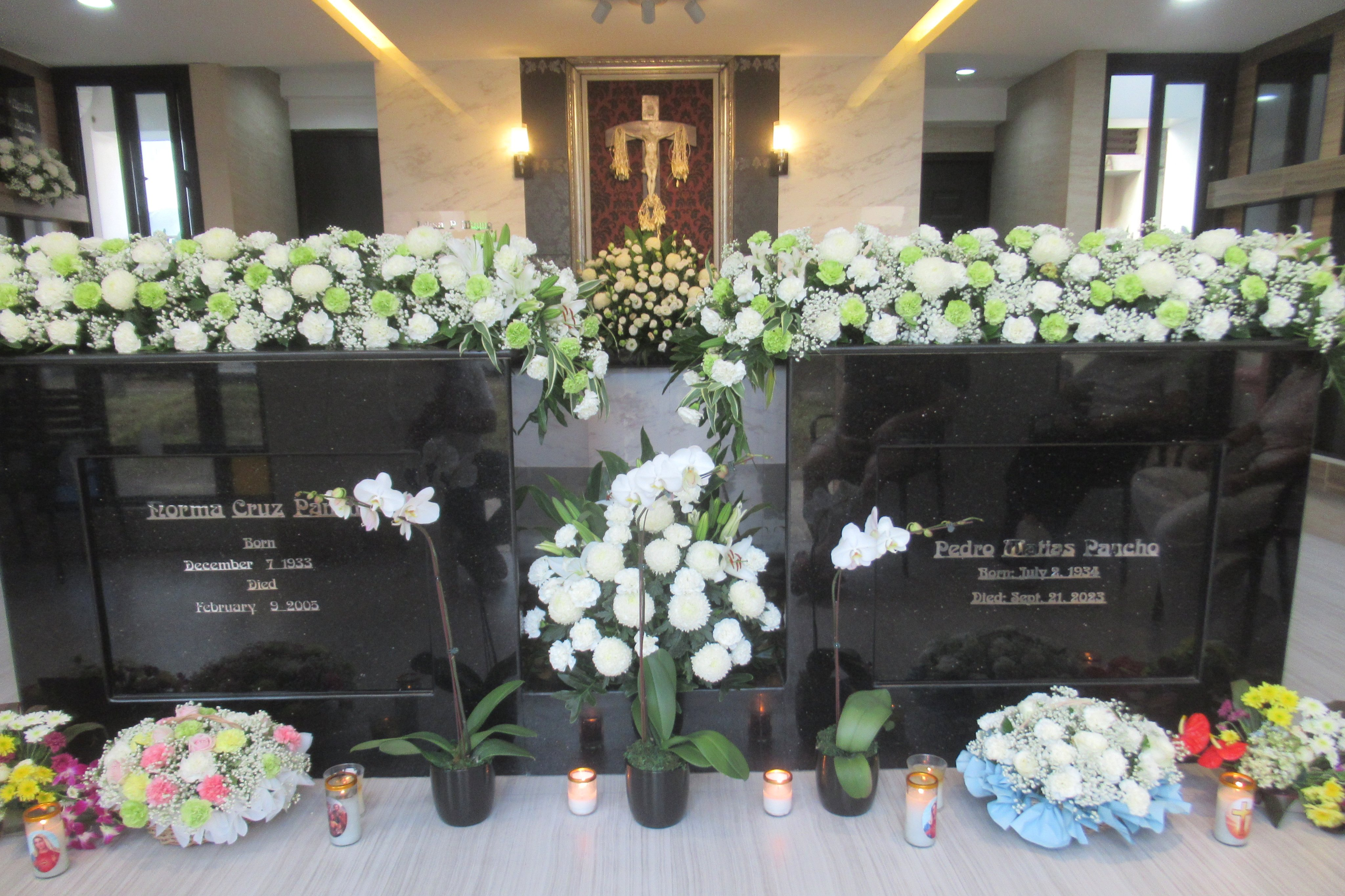
The tomb of Pancho and his wife, Norma

Pancho married Norma Cruz. She died in Baliwag on February 9, 2005 at the age of 72. They have seven children, including Mia, Bong, Ongie, Patrick, incumbent Bulacan's 2nd congressional district representative Tina Pancho, who succeeded her brother Gavini "Apol" Pancho, who himself served from 2013 to 2022.

The House of Representatives of the Philippines conducted a necrological service and passed House Resolution No. 1323 authored by House Speaker Martin Romualdez to honor Pancho who represented Bulacan's 2nd district during the 9th, 10th, 11th, 13th, 14th, and 15th Congress.

Pancho died on September 21, 2023, at the age of 89. His funeral was held on September 24 with a wake and lying in state at his ancestral house in Calantipay, Baliwag. The Requiem Mas was offered at Saint Augustine Parish Church in Baliuag. He was buried at their family mausoleum in Baliuag Memorial Park alongside his siblings Carmen, Aurelia, Candido and Teodoro. His brother Engineer Cornelio (b. 1932, d. 2000), a billionaire, founder, President and CEO of C.M. Pancho Construction, Inc. (CMPCI) is buried at the nearby Baliuag Catholic Cemetery.

== Legacy ==
The technological building of Bulacan State University Bustos, Bulacan Campus was named Pedro Pancho Hall to honor his initiative as 2nd District Representative in completing the edifice in 2007.

House of Representatives of the Philippines
| Preceded by Wilfrido Villarama | Member of the House of Representatives from Bulacan's 2nd district 2004–2013; 1992–2001 | Succeeded by Gavini Pancho |
| Preceded by Vicente Rivera Jr. | Member of the House of Representatives from Bulacan's 2nd district 2004–2013; 1992–2001 | Succeeded by Wilfrido Villarama |
