= Agay Cruz =

Filipina lawyer and politician (born 1980)

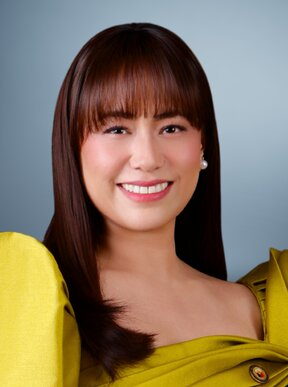
- Official portrait, 2026

Member of the Philippine House of Representatives from Bulacan's 5th District
- Incumbent
- Assumed office June 30, 2025
- Preceded by: Ambrosio Cruz Jr.

Mayor of Guiguinto
- In office June 30, 2022 – June 30, 2025
- Preceded by: Ambrosio Cruz Jr.
- Succeeded by: Ambrosio Cruz Jr.

Personal details
- Born: Agatha Paula Aguilar Cruz; October 1, 1980 (age 46) Ermita, Manila, Philippines
- Party: PFP (2026–present)
- Other political affiliations: Lakas (2024–2026); PDP (2021–2024)
- Education: De La Salle University (BS); Ateneo de Manila University School of Law (JD)
- Occupation: Lawyer, politician, educator
- Profession: Lawyer

Agatha Paula "Agay" Aguilar Cruz (born October 1, 1980) is a Filipino lawyer and politician who currently serving as the representative of the 5th District of Bulacan in the House of Representatives of the Philippines since 2025. She previously served as Mayor of Guiguinto, Bulacan from 2022 to 2025.

== Early life and education ==
Cruz was born on October 1, 1980 to Ambrosio Cruz Jr. and Prescila Aguilar. Cruz graduated with a Bachelor of Science degree in Commerce, majoring in Marketing Management, from De La Salle University, where her thesis on market research received a gold medal and earned her cum laude honors. She completed her postgraduate studies at the Ateneo de Manila University School of Law, graduating with second honors. She passed the bar in 2009 and became a lawyer.

== Career ==
=== Legal career ===
Before passing the bar examination in 2008, Cruz interned at the Romulo, Mabanta Buenaventura, Sayoc, and De Los Angeles law firm. She later worked at the Ponce Enrile, Reyes & Manalastas law firm.

=== Academic career ===
Cruz served as a faculty of the Far Eastern University Institute of Law for two years, upon the invitation of its dean Mel Sta. Maria, her former professor at Ateneo.

=== Political career ===
==== Mayor of Guiguinto (2022–2025) ====
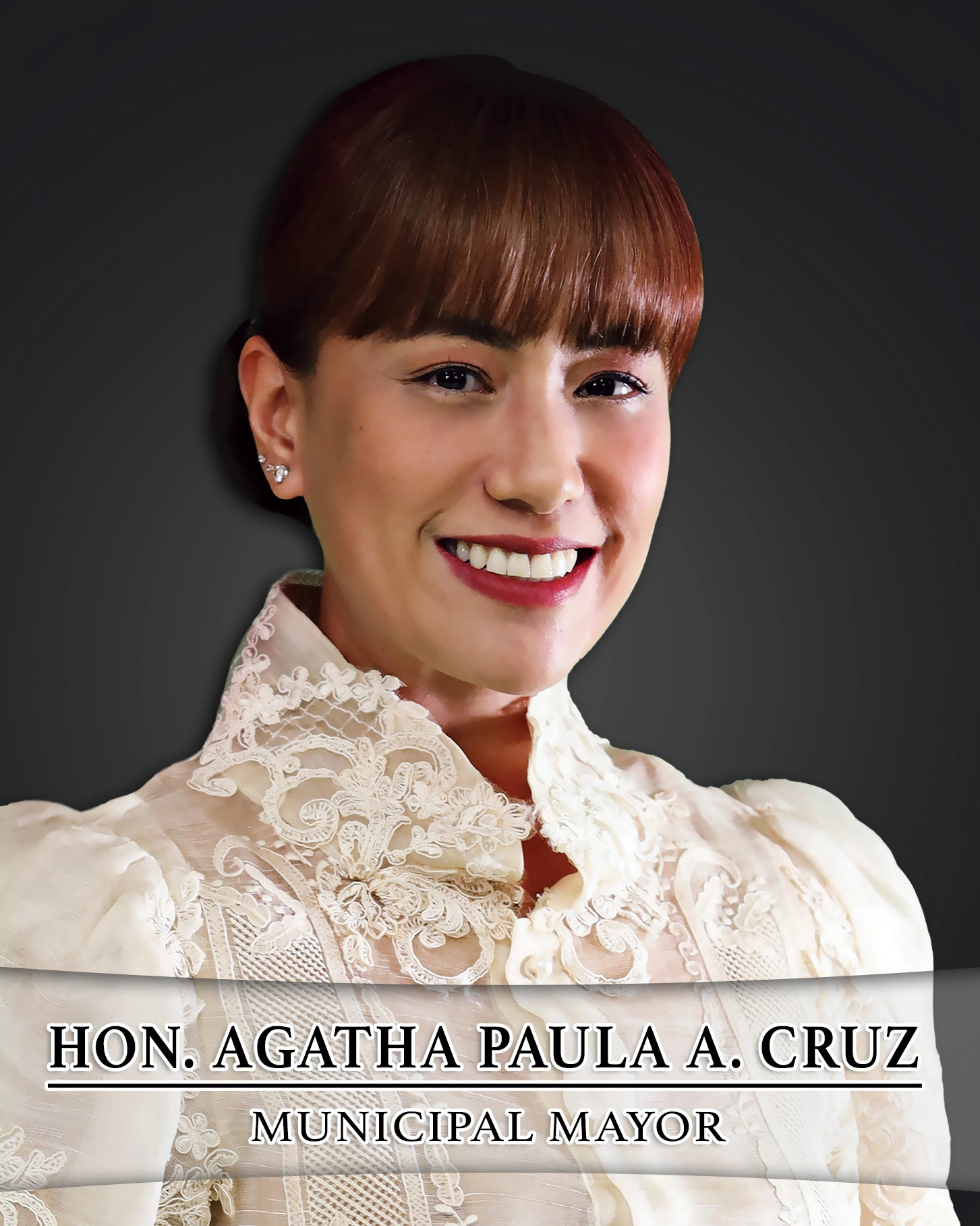
Portrait of Cruz during her term as Mayor of Guiguinto, Bulacan

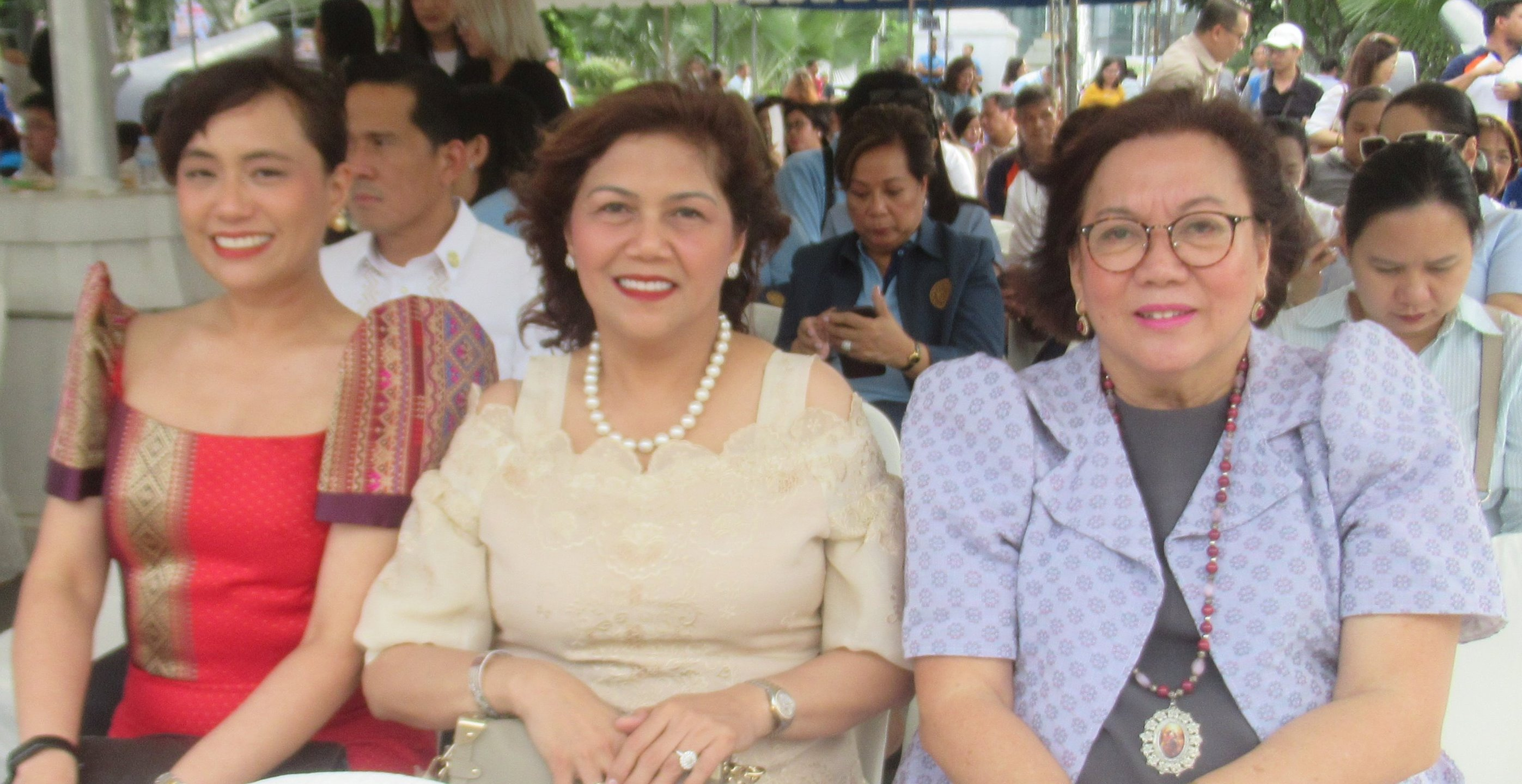
Cruz (left) at the 19th Singkaban Festival Singkaban Festival held at the Bulacan Provincial Capitol on September 9, 2024

Cruz was elected Mayor of Guiguinto in 2022, succeeding her father Ambrosio Cruz, who was elected representative of Bulacan's 5th district. During her tenure as mayor, she focused on health initiatives, infrastructure development, and environmental programs.

==== House of Representatives (2025-present) ====
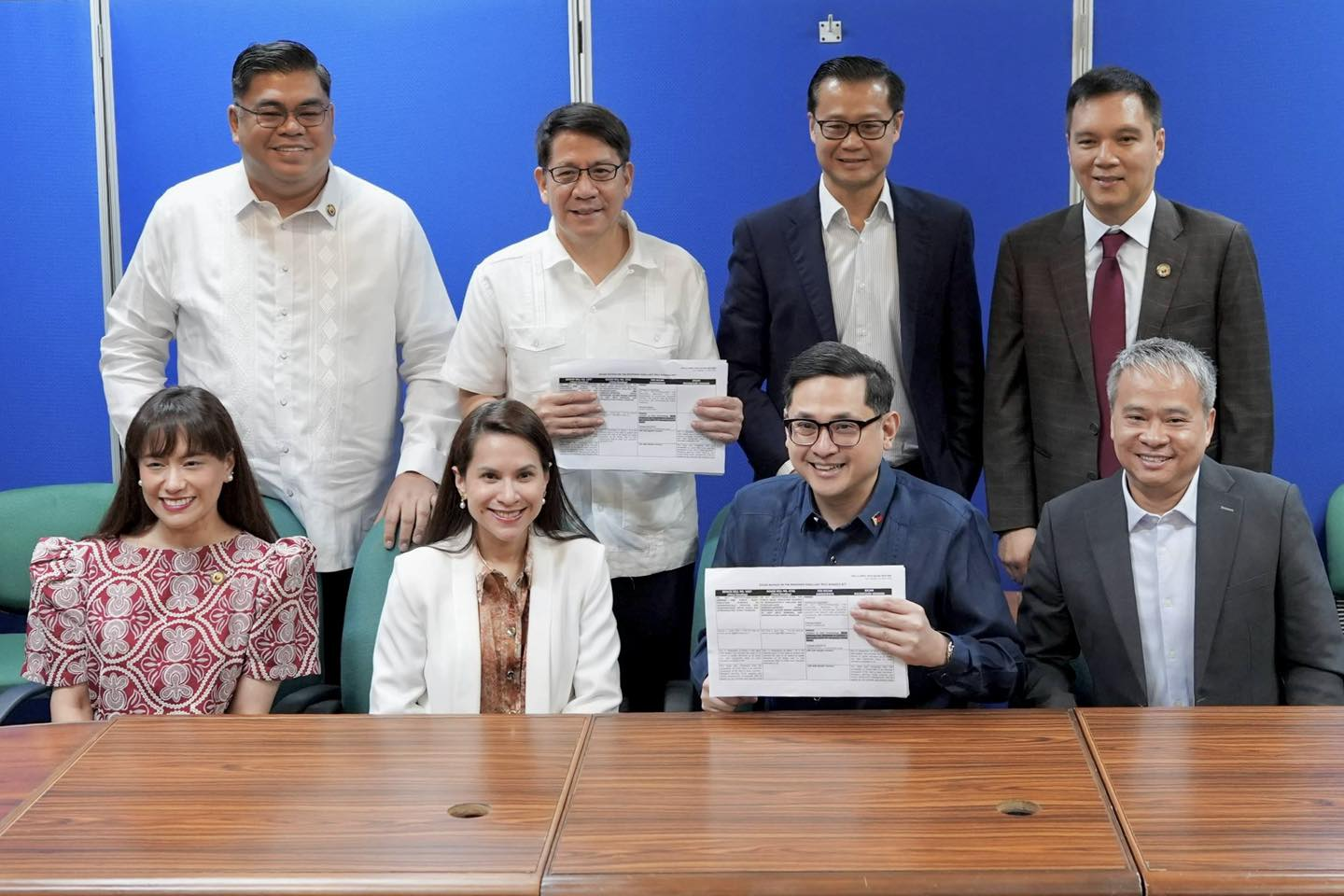
Cruz (seated far left) following the signing of the bicameral conference committee report for the proposed GIDA Schools Act at the Senate in 2026

Cruz was elected as the representative of the 5th District of Bulacan, which covers the municipalities of Guiguinto, Balagtas, Pandi, and Bocaue. She switched places with her father. As a congresswoman, she has expressed her intention to play a major role in drafting provisions of the national budget for education and the Early Childhood Care and Development program. She also seeks strong oversight to monitor the implementation of Republic Act No. 11223 (Universal Health Care Act of 2019) and is pushing for detailed urban planning for her district based on the Climate Change Framework mandated by Republic Act No. 9729 (Climate Change Act of 2009).

== Advocacy and community work ==
Cruz founded the Presam Foundation Inc. in Guiguinto, named after her parents Prescila and Ambrosio. The foundation provides scholarships and advocates for women's causes. She also supports Bahay Pangarap Women's Foundation Inc. for abused young women and Tahanang Mapagkalinga ni Madre Rita for abandoned children.

She established the sectoral movement "Kaagapay sa Buhay," composed of young volunteer leaders who handle projects related to health, education, inclusivity, and environment. Cruz has organized various community programs including mass weddings (kasalang bayan) and serenades (harana) for persons with disabilities (PWDs), members of the LGBT community, and senior citizens.

== Political philosophy and goals ==
Cruz has expressed her vision of transforming Guiguinto into a progressive city, building upon her father's work in elevating it from a third-class to a first-class municipality. Her long-term goal includes making Guiguinto "the happiest place for a child to grow up in" through initiatives focusing on low crime rates, maternal nutrition, well-equipped educational facilities, flood control, employment opportunities, and technology advancement.

She cites Vico Sotto (Mayor of Pasig City) and Jacinda Ardern (former Prime Minister of New Zealand) as her role models in governance.

== Electoral history ==
Electoral history of Agay Cruz
Year	Office	Party	Votes received				Result
Year	Office	Party	Total	%	P.	Swing	Result
2022	Mayor of Guiguinto	PDP–Laban	36,004	54.91%	1st	—N/a	Won
2025	Representative (Bulacan–5th)	Lakas	188,973	85.11%	1st	—N/a	Won
