= 107.5 FM =

FM radio frequency

The following radio stations broadcast on FM frequency 107.5 MHz:

== Argentina ==
- 1075 in Mansilla, Entre Rios
- Activa in San Luis
- Alcira Gigena in Alcira Gigena, Córdoba
- Alternativa in Alvear, Corrientes
- Buena Vista in Sierras Chicas, Córdoba
- Cadena 3 Argentina in Tucumán
- Ciudad in Monte Cristo, Córdoba
- Condor in Mendoza
- Estacion X in La Falda, Córdoba
- Gen in Córdoba
- Milenium Patagonia in Dina Huapi, Río Negro
- Nuevos Horizontes in Villa de Mayo, Buenos Aires
- Reflejos in San Salvador, Entre Ríos
- San Martin in La Paz, Entre Ríos
- Super in Rosario, Santa Fe
- Río in Avellaneda, Buenos Aires
- Universidad in La Plata, Buenos Aires
- Xpress in Corrientes

== Australia ==
- 2OCB in Orange, New South Wales
- 3MPH in Mildura, Victoria
- ABC Northern Tasmania in Strahan, Tasmania
- Triple J in Cairns, Queensland
- Triple J in Melbourne, Victoria

== Canada (Channel 298) ==
- CBAF-FM-6 in Middleton, Nova Scotia
- CBAF-FM-11 in Mulgrave, Nova Scotia
- CBCK-FM in Kingston, Ontario
- CBRX-FM-1 in Matane, Quebec
- CFOO-FM in Burns Lake, British Columbia
- CFSM-FM in Cranbrook, British Columbia
- CFTX-FM-1 in Buckingham, Quebec
- CKKS-FM in Chilliwack, British Columbia
- CHBO-FM in Humboldt, Saskatchewan
- CIAM-FM-7 in Slave Lake, Alberta
- CIAM-FM-9 in Dawson Creek, British Columbia
- CIEG-FM in Egmont, British Columbia
- CISC-FM in Gibsons, British Columbia
- CITF-FM in Quebec City, Quebec
- CJDV-FM in Cambridge, Ontario
- CJIE-FM in Winnipeg Beach, Manitoba
- CJSE-FM-2 in Baie Ste. Anne, New Brunswick
- CKIZ-FM in Vernon, British Columbia
- CKMB-FM in Barrie, Ontario
- CKSJ-FM-1 in Clarenville, Newfoundland and Labrador
- VF2517 in New Denver, British Columbia

== Colombia ==
- in Ibagué, Colombia

== China ==
- CNR The Voice of China in Jingdezhen and Siping
- CNR Business Radio in Nanjing
- Dongguan Traffic Radio

== Indonesia ==
- Music City Fm in Jakarta, Indonesia (off air)

== Israel ==
- Radio Haifa in Haifa and the Krayot

== Malaysia ==
- Fly FM in Kuala Terengganu, Terengganu
- Pahang FM in West Pahang and Klang Valley

== Mexico ==
- XHIZU-FM in Izucar de Matamoros, Puebla
- XHKG-FM in Fortín, Veracruz
- XHNZ-FM in Ciudad Juárez, Chihuahua
- XHOM-FM in Coatzacoalcos, Veracruz
- XHPCO-FM in Paracho, Michoacán
- XHQRO-FM in Cortázar, Guanajuato
- XHSCAT-FM in Villa de Álvarez-Colima, Colima
- XHSCBC-FM in Témoris, Guazapares, Chihuahua
- XHSCCJ-FM in Tenancingo de Degollado, Estado de México
- XHSCCR-FM in Huejúcar, Jalisco
- XHSCDA-FM in San Pedro Mixtepec Distrito 22, Oaxaca
- XHSCDE-FM in Petatlán, Guerrero
- XHSICA-FM in Piedras Negras, Coahuila
- XHSTC-FM in Santiago Choapam, Oaxaca
- XHUSH-FM in Hermosillo, Sonora
- XHVOZ-FM in Guadalajara, Jalisco

== New Zealand ==
- Various low-power stations up to 1 watt

== Philippines ==
- DWNU in Manila, Philippines as Wish FM
- DYNU in Cebu City
- DXNU in Davao City
- DWNE in Laoag City
- DWAQ in Legazpi City

== United Kingdom ==
- Greatest Hits Radio Somerset in Frome and West Somerset
- Greatest Hits Radio South West in Cheltenham and west Wiltshire
- Radio Pembrokeshire in Fishguard and Tenby
- Time 107.5 in Romford

== United States (Channel 298) ==
- KABR (FM) in Alamo Community, New Mexico
- KASH-FM in Anchorage, Alaska
- KBGY in Faribault, Minnesota
- KBWG-LP in Browning, Montana
- KENR in Superior, Montana
- KFEB in Campbell, Missouri
- KGLK in Lake Jackson, Texas
- KHEI-FM in Kihei, Hawaii
- KHYT in Tucson, Arizona
- KIFS in Ashland, Oregon
- KILV in Castana, Iowa
- KJCN (FM) in Sutter Creek, California
- KJKJ in Grand Forks, North Dakota
- KJMH in Lake Arthur, Louisiana
- KJTJ-LP in Sidney, Nebraska
- KKDM in Des Moines, Iowa
- KKLV in Kaysville, Utah
- KKSJ-LP in Beloit, Kansas
- KKTZ in Mountain Home, Arkansas
- KLIZ-FM in Brainerd, Minnesota
- KLJE-LP in Columbia, Missouri
- KLVE in Los Angeles, California
- KMVK in Fort Worth, Texas
- KNOL in Jean Lafitte, Louisiana
- KNSG in Marshall, Minnesota
- KOND in Hanford, California
- KOSN in Ketchum, Oklahoma
- KOUG-LP in Pullman, Washington
- KPIG-FM in Freedom, California
- KQBA in Los Alamos, New Mexico
- KQBO in Rio Grande City, Texas
- KQKS in Lakewood, Colorado
- KRPM in Billings, Montana
- KSCB-FM in Liberal, Kansas
- KSED in Sedona, Arizona
- KSJT-FM in San Angelo, Texas
- KSMX-FM in Clovis, New Mexico
- KVBH in San Antonio, Texas
- KWBZ in Monroe City, Missouri
- KXJM in Banks, Oregon
- KXKZ in Ruston, Louisiana
- KXO-FM in El Centro, California
- KXTE in Pahrump, Nevada
- KYZK in Sun Valley, Idaho
- KZIG in Wapanucka, Oklahoma
- KZSZ in Colusa, California
- WABX in Evansville, Indiana
- WAMJ in Roswell, Georgia
- WAMR-FM in Miami, Florida
- WAZO in Southport, North Carolina
- WBBI in Endwell, New York
- WBFC-LP in Boynton, Georgia
- WBLS in New York, New York
- WBVE in Bedford, Pennsylvania
- WBYN-FM in Boyertown, Pennsylvania
- WCCN-FM in Neillsville, Wisconsin
- WCCW-FM in Traverse City, Michigan
- WCHV-FM in Charlottesville, Virginia
- WCKX in Columbus, Ohio
- WDBQ-FM in Galena, Illinois
- WDUZ-FM in Brillion, Wisconsin
- WEGW in Wheeling, West Virginia
- WFCC-FM in Chatham, Massachusetts
- WFNK in Lewiston, Maine
- WFXJ-FM in North Kingsville, Ohio
- WGCI-FM in Chicago, Illinois
- WGPR in Detroit, Michigan
- WHBQ-FM in Germantown, Tennessee
- WIOK in Falmouth, Kentucky
- WJHC (FM) in Jasper, Florida
- WKXI in Magee, Mississippi
- WKYB in Perryville, Kentucky
- WKZL in Winston-Salem, North Carolina
- WLDJ-LP in New Castle, Pennsylvania
- WLRG-LP in Corning, New York
- WMJW in Rosedale, Mississippi
- WNEE-LP in Tallahassee, Florida
- WNHA-LP in New Haven, Connecticut
- WNKT in Eastover, South Carolina
- WNNT-FM in Warsaw, Virginia
- WPZM-LP in Gainesville, Florida
- WQTP-LP in Columbus, Mississippi
- WRUU-LP in Savannah, Georgia
- WRVW in Lebanon, Tennessee
- WRWR in Cochran, Georgia
- WTIF-FM in Omega, Georgia
- WVER-FM in West Rutland, Vermont
- WWGF in Donalsonville, Georgia
- WWMM-LP in Collinsville, Connecticut
- WYDD-LP in Youngstown, Florida
- WYLJ in Terre Haute, Indiana
- WZLK in Virgie, Kentucky
- WZRX-FM in Fort Shawnee, Ohio
- WZZZ in Portsmouth, Ohio

== Vietnam ==
- Da Lat + VOV1 and LamDongFM in Da Lat City, Lam Dong Province
