= Pantabangan–Carranglan Watershed Forest Reserve =

Nature reserve in Luzon, Philippines

- IUCN category VI (protected area with sustainable use of natural resources)
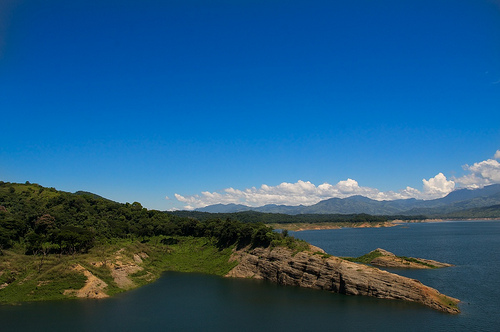
- Pantabangan Lake in the Upper Pampanga River Basin

- Location within Luzon Location within Philippines
- Location: Nueva Ecija, Aurora and Nueva Vizcaya, Philippines
- Nearest city: San Jose
- Coordinates: 15°50′42″N 121°9′53″E
- Area: 84,500 hectares (209,000 acres)
- Established: May 21, 1969
- Governing body: Department of Environment and Natural Resources; National Irrigation Administration; Metropolitan Waterworks and Sewerage System; First Gen Hydro Power Corp.

The Pantabangan–Carranglan Watershed Forest Reserve is a conservation area located in the upper reaches of the Pampanga River in Nueva Ecija, Philippines, and borders the Sierra Madre and Caraballo Mountains in Aurora and Nueva Vizcaya. It encompasses 84,500 hectares (209,000 acres) of the drainage basin surrounding the Pantabangan Lake, an impoundment of the Pampanga River by the Pantabangan Dam. The multi-purpose dam is situated at the confluence of Pampanga River's two headwaters, namely the Pantabangan and Carranglan Rivers in the municipality of Pantabangan. It stretches above the dam site for 21 kilometres (13 mi) to where Carranglan River originates in the Caraballo on the north, and for 18 kilometres (11 mi) to where Pantabangan River originates in the Sierra Madre on the east. It is considered a critical watershed for the agricultural economy and hydroelectric power generation in the region of Central Luzon.

== History ==
Proclamation No. 561 established the reserve's boundaries and protecting the area for watershed purposes on May 21, 1969. Its management was handed over to the Bureau of Forestry of the DENR, the Reforestation Administration, the National Waterworks and Sewerage Authority (NAWASA, now the MWSS), the National Irrigation Administration (NIA), Bureau of Public Works (now DPWH), Bureau of Public Soils (now Bureau of Soils and Water Management), and the National Power Corporation. A month later, President Marcos authorized the construction of the Upper Pampanga River Project at the reserve with the Pantabangan Dam as its centerpiece. Construction started in March 1971 with residents at the dam site relocated to the upper portion of Pantabangan by the Department of Agrarian Reform and NIA. By the time the Pantabangan Dam was completed in August 1974, eight barrios have been submerged by its reservoir, namely the old Pantabangan poblacion, Conversión, Villarica, San Juan, Cadaclan, Napon-Napon, Liberty and Marikit.

== Description ==
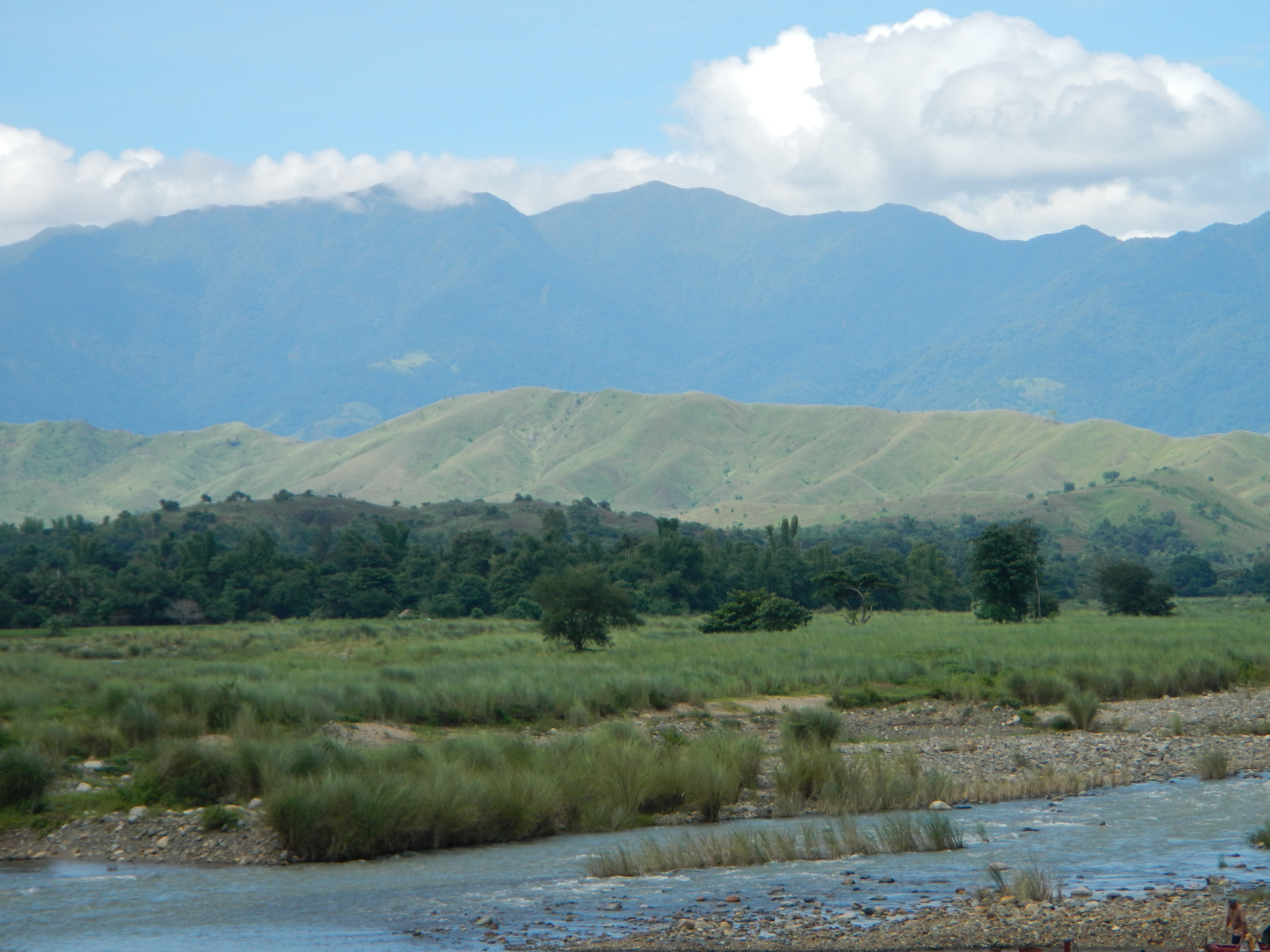
Carranglan River in Carranglan, a headwater of the Pampanga River

The Pantabangan–Carranglan Watershed is in the north of Nueva Ecija, on its border with Nueva Vizcaya and Aurora, approximately 176 kilometres (109 mi) north of Manila. It is spread over 36 barangays or villages in five municipalities: Carranglan, Pantabangan, Alfonso Castañeda, Dupax del Sur and Maria Aurora. The reserve consists of flat areas and rolling to rugged and steep mountainous landscape. In the Caraballo and Sierra Madre range, it is dissected by narrow flat-bottomed valleys and drained by the Carranglan and Pantabangan rivers, the headwaters of Pampanga River, which eventually feed into the 4,023-hectare (9,940-acre) Pantabangan Lake, one of the largest reservoirs in Southeast Asia and one of the cleanest in the Philippines. The reservoir is a major water source for domestic consumption in Central Luzon and supplies the irrigation requirements of 24 municipalities in Nueva Ecija, Bulacan and Pampanga. Its two dams, the Pantabangan and Masiway, also generate 112 megawatts of hydroelectric power to the Luzon grid. The lake also receives inflow from the Casecnan Dam which diverts water from the Casecnan and Taan Rivers in Nueva Vizcaya via a 25-kilometre (16 mi) long transbasin tunnel constructed in 2001.

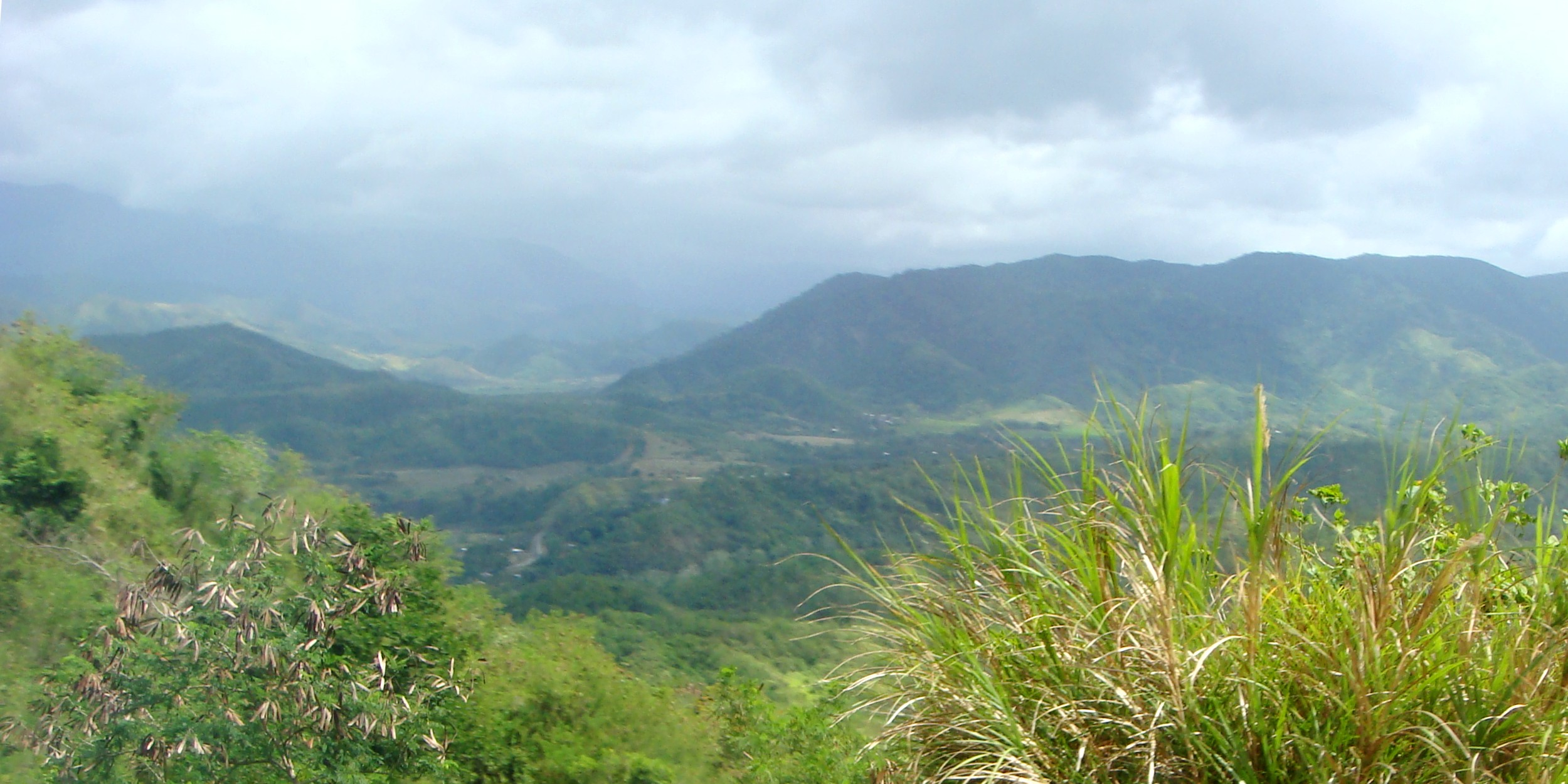
View of the forest reserve from the Pantabangan–Baler Road in Cadaclan, Pantabangan

The reserve contains a number of notable peaks, the highest being Mount Susong Dalaga at 1,650 metres (5,410 ft) above sea level in Alfonso Castañeda, followed by Mount Nedumular at 1,410 metres (4,630 ft) above sea level in Maria Aurora. It is also home to a number of recreational sites including the Binbin Falls which consists of three cascades in Carranglan, and the Pajanutic Falls at 15 metres (49 ft) near Carranglan's poblacion. The focal point of the reserve is the Pantabangan Lake which offers opportunities for fishing, boating, jet-skiing and swimming. It also rewards visitors with views of the vast expanse of the surrounding Sierra Madre and Caraballo mountains. A hotel on the southern shore of the lake offers a spa, swimming pool, tennis court and water sports amenities. The lake hosts occasional sports fishing competitions, as well as the Pandawan Festival, an annual event celebrating the lake's fishing industry.

The reserve is adjacent to three other protected areas in Central Luzon and Cagayan Valley: the Casecnan Protected Landscape to the north, the Aurora Memorial National Park to the east and south, and the Talavera Watershed Forest Reserve to the west. It is accessible from Manila via the Pan-Philippine Highway and Rizal–Pantabangan Road in Cabanatuan, and via the Subic–Clark–Tarlac Expressway, Tarlac–Pangasinan–La Union Expressway, Pangasinan–Nueva Ecija Road and San Jose–Rizal Road in San Jose.

== Flora and fauna ==
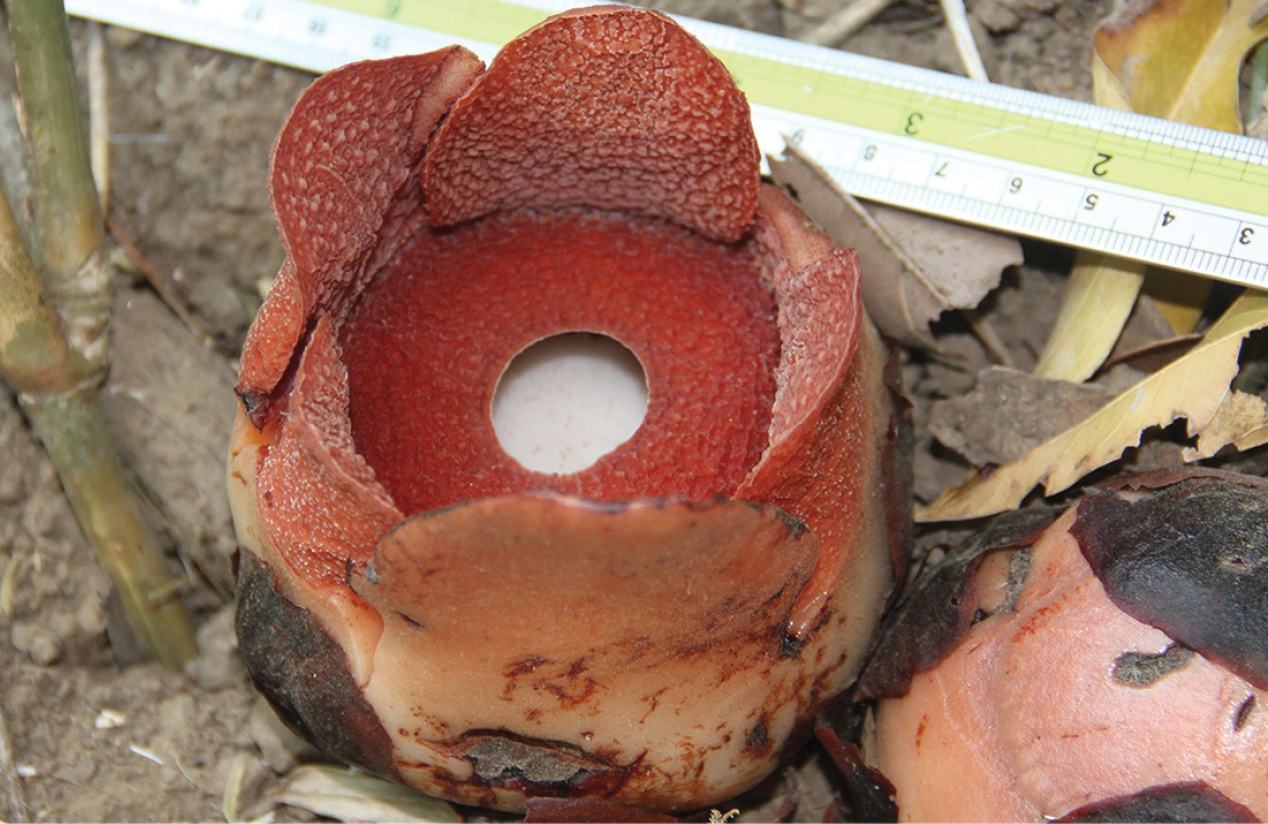
Rafflesia consueloae, smallest raflessia species in the world, is found only in the Pantabangan–Carranglan Watershed Forest Reserve.

The reserve is composed of 36,915 hectares (91,220 acres) of forest and reforestation areas, 35,665 hectares (88,130 acres) of open grasslands, 9,545 hectares (23,590 acres) of croplands, and 775 hectares (1,920 acres) of residential and riverwash areas. The forestland is an area of secondary growth trees such as earleaf acacia, eucalyptus, yemane, ipil-ipil, mahogany and narra. On the ridges above 700 metres (2,300 ft) are areas of Benguet pine forests mixed with montane Dipterocarp trees. The open grasslands occupying the flat areas near Pantabangan Lake primarily consist of cogon grass, samon and talahib. Alibangbang trees also grow abundantly in the reserve. In February 2014, the smallest species of the Rafflesia parasitic plant, the Rafflesia consueloae, was discovered within the reserve on Mount Pantaburon and Mount Balukbok near the Pantabangan and Masiway hydroelectric dams.

The reserve also provides an important refuge for wildlife such as the Philippine deer, crab-eating macaque, Philippine duck, Eastern grass owl, red junglefowl, reticulated python, and Asian water monitor.
