= DWAQ =

DWAQ may refer to the two Philippine broadcast stations with the same callsign:

- DWAQ-FM, a radio station in Legazpi, Albay. Branded as Good News Radio.
- DWAQ-DTV, a television station in Metro Manila. Branded as SMNI.
