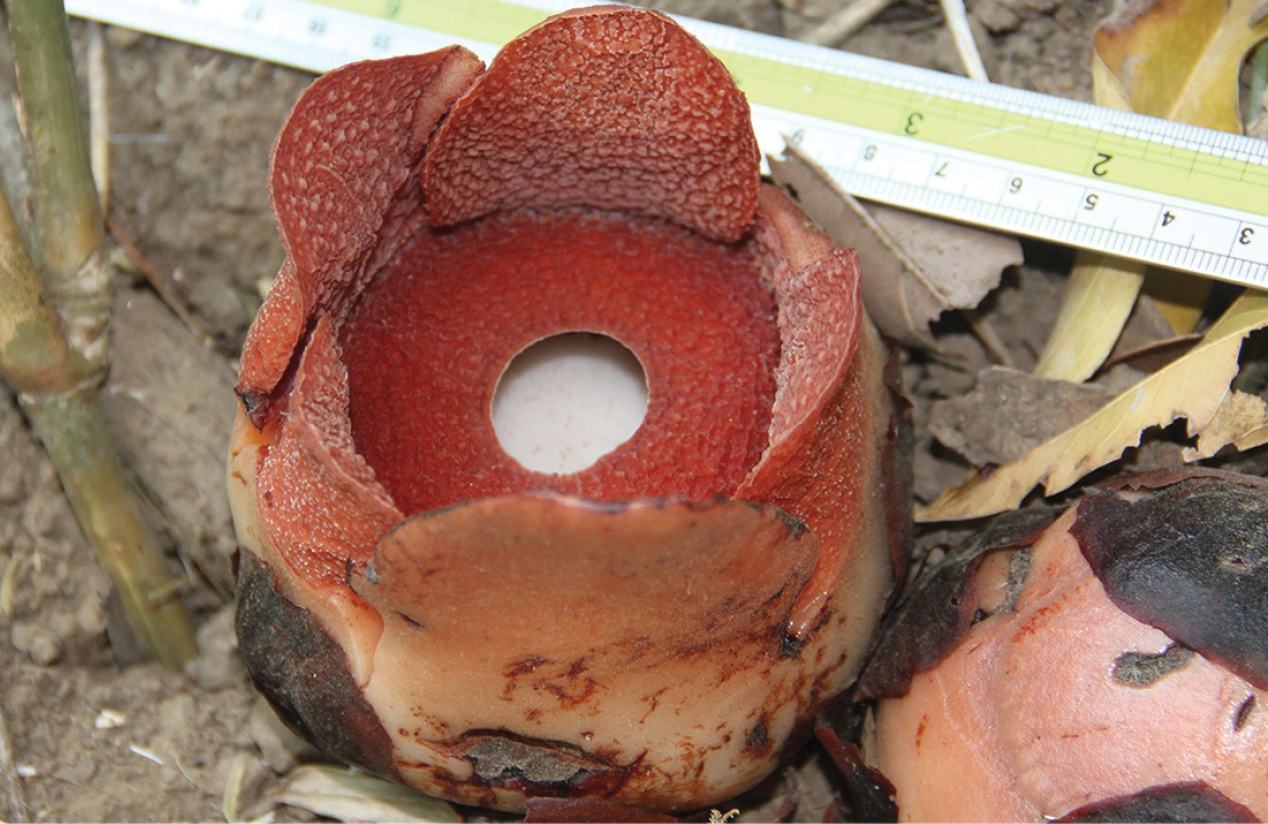

Scientific classification
- Kingdom: Plantae
- Clade: Embryophytes
- Clade: Tracheophytes
- Clade: Spermatophytes
- Clade: Angiosperms
- Clade: Eudicots
- Clade: Rosids
- Order: Malpighiales
- Family: Rafflesiaceae
- Genus: Rafflesia
- Species: R. consueloae

Binomial name
- Rafflesia consueloae Galindon, Ong & Fernando, 2016
- Range in green

= Rafflesia consueloae =

Species of flowering plant

Rafflesia consueloae is a parasitic plant species of the genus Rafflesia endemic to the island of Luzon in the Philippines. It is the smallest species of the genus Rafflesia.

== Taxonomy ==
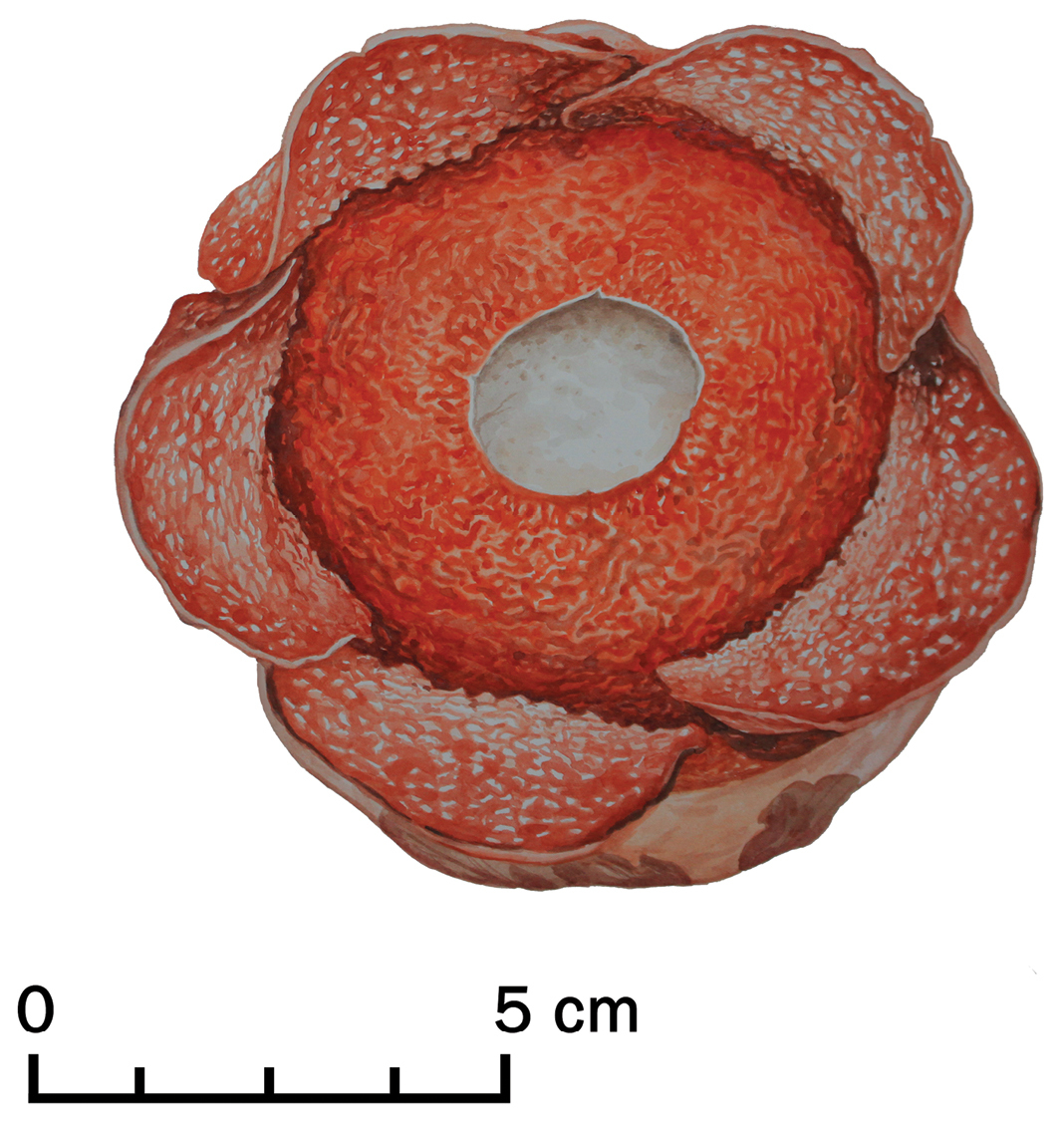
Colored illustration of Rafflesia consueloae by Yasmin Ong.

The Rafflesia consueloae discovery was a result of a long-term biodiversity conservation and monitoring program at the Pantabangan-Carranglan Watershed which commenced in March 2011. R. consueloae was discovered on 11 February 2014 when a researcher walking in a heavily degraded rain forest north of Manila tripped over a mass of rotting leaves, and noticed an unusual bloom; a monitoring for the Rafflesia species was immediately started. The research team installed motion-activated camera to observe the life cycle of R. consueloae.

Rafflesia consueloae was described and illustrated by John Michael M. Galindon and Perry S. Ong of the University of the Philippines Diliman and Edwino S. Fernando of University of the Philippines Los Baños. The species was named after Consuelo Rufino Lopez, the spouse of industrialist and conservationist, Oscar M. Lopez.

Under the Wildlife Forensics and DNA Barcoding of the Philippine Biodiversity Program of the Department of the Environment and Natural Resources-Biodiversity Management Bureau, the DNA barcode of R. consueloae and its host, an unidentified species of Tetrastigma, is being studied.

== Description ==
The species is the smallest of all Rafflesia, measuring an average diameter of 9.73 centimeters (3.83 in) when fully expanded. The disk surface of newly opened flowers of R. consueloae is described to as distinctly cream-white and usually without processes. It is reported that R. consueloae has bisexual flowers, the third species after R. baletei and R. verrucosa to be described as such in the Philippines, but it has not been established whether both sexes of each flower are functional.

Rafflesia consueloae's flowers do not exhibit the distinct odor found in R. arnoldii (nicknamed the "corpse flower") and most species of Rafflesia, with its fruit instead bearing a smell reminiscent of young coconut meat.

== Distribution and habitat ==
There are only two known habitats of the Rafflesia consueloae which are both within the Pantabangan-Carranglan Watershed in Pantabangan, Nueva Ecija. The species is known to occur in Mount Balukbok and Mount Pantaburon. Its area of habitat in Mount Pantaburon is an old reforestation site.

Rafflesia consueloae is known to occur between 300 meters (980 ft) and 500 meters (1,600 ft) above sea level. It grows exclusively in the roots of an unidentified species of Tetrastigma among thickets of Dinochloa luconiae, a climbing bamboo.

== Conservation ==
Rafflesia consueloae was classified as "Critically Endangered" based on the IUCN Categories and Criteria of 2012 (IUCN 3.1) by those who described the species. The habitat of the species is a known hunting ground for some members of the local community. The sites are also particularly vulnerable to forest fires during the dry season.
