= WBFC =

WBFC may refer to:

- WBFC (AM), a radio station (1470 AM) licensed to Stanton, Kentucky, United States
- WBFC-LP, a low-power radio station (107.5 FM) licensed to Boynton, Georgia, United States
- Waanal Brothers F.C., a football club from Mimika Regency, Indonesia
- Whitley Bay F.C., a football club from Whitley Bay, UK
