= WAAK-LP =

- Boynton, Georgia; United States
- Broadcast area: Boynton, Georgia; Ringgold, Georgia
- Frequency: 94.7 MHz
- Branding: "K-94.7"

Programming
- Format: Adult Standards

Ownership
- Owner: Boynton Educational Radio, Inc.

History
- First air date: 2005

Technical information
- Licensing authority: FCC
- Facility ID: 124182
- Class: L1
- ERP: 5 watts
- HAAT: 134 meters
- Transmitter coordinates: 34°53′49.0″N 85°8′38.0″W

Links
- Public license information: LMS
- Webcast: WAAK-LP Webstream
- Website: waakradio.com

WAAK-LP is an adult standards-formatted broadcast radio station licensed to Boynton, Georgia, serving the Boynton/Ringgold area. WAAK-LP is owned and operated by Boynton Educational Radio, Inc.
