= Casecnan Dam =

Dam in Luzon, Philippines

Casecnan Irrigation and Hydroelectric Plant
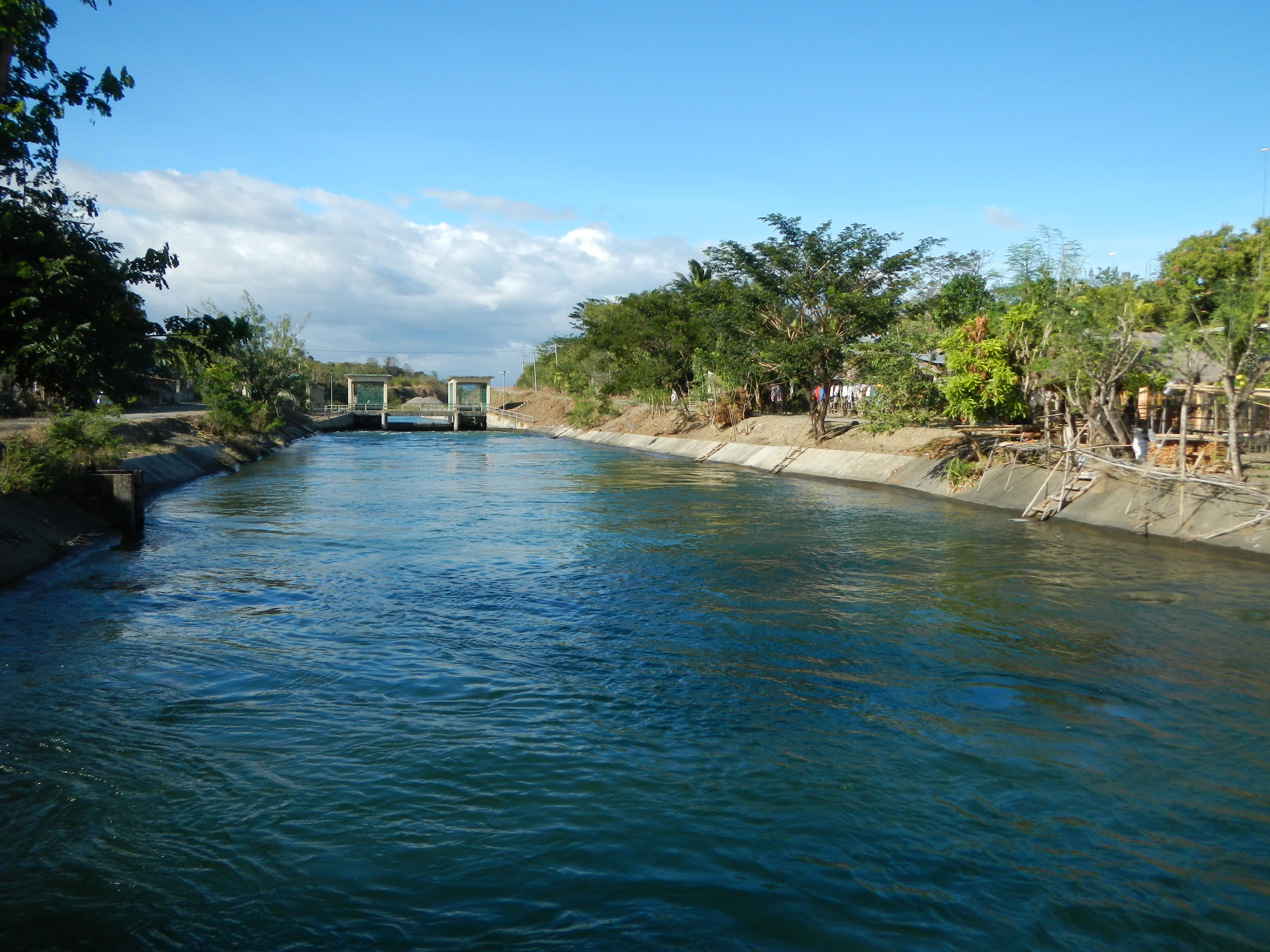
- Casecnan Irrigation and Power Generation Project Rizal, Nueva Ecija

- Location within Nueva Ecija Location within Luzon Location within Philippines
- Country: Philippines
- Coordinates: 16°00′09″N 121°19′57″E
- Construction began: 1995
- Opening date: 2002
- Construction cost: $ 600 Million or 28.07 Billion pesos (at current price)
- Owners: National Power Corporation; National Irrigation Administration

Dam and spillways
- Impounds: Casecnan Irrigation and Power Generation Project (Rizal, Nueva Ecija)

Reservoir
- Total capacity: 802,000,000 cubic metres (650,000 acre⋅ft)

Power Station
- Commission date: 2002
- Installed capacity: 140 MW
- Annual generation: 425,000,000 kWh

Casecnan Irrigation and Hydroelectric Plant is a dam diverting water from the Casecnan and Taan Rivers to the Pantabangan Reservoir through a 26-kilometre (16 mi) long tunnel located near Pantabangan and Muñoz in Nueva Ecija province of the Philippines. The multi-purpose dam provides water for irrigation and hydroelectric power generation while its reservoir affords flood control. It was considered one of the most expensive hydroelectric plants built in the country, being next only to San Roque Dam.

The Casecnan Irrigation and Power Generation Project is also located in Rizal, Nueva Ecija. The P6.75-B Project provides irrigation to 26,920 hectares of new farms in the Science City of Munoz, Talugtog, Guimba, Cuyapo, and Nampicuan, all of Nueva Ecija. It generates 150 megawatts of power for the Luzon grid that will supply cheap electricity to millions of people in Luzon including Metro Manila.

== History ==
In August 1987, former President Corazon Aquino signed Executive Order 136, which provides for the establishment of a Watershed Forest Reserve out of the Casecnan River. The reserve covered an area of 57,930 hectares (143,100 acres). By May 1993, former President Fidel Ramos sought out investors to fund the Casecnan Phased Transbasin Project. It became one of the flagship programs of the Ramos government and by 1995, the Casecnan Project got approved for construction. In September 2001, former President Gloria Macapagal Arroyo finally opened the diversion tunnel after two years after the Phase I of the Casecnan project was done. In 2012, the Aquino government approved the construction of the second phase of the Casecnan project.

== Power generation ==
When the Ramos government approved the start of the Casecnan project, the constructed power plant was planned to have produced 150 megawatts. However, it only produced 140 megawatts after the power plant began operation.

== Irrigation ==
The original output for irrigation of Casecnan was the irrigation of around 50,000 hectares (120,000 acres) of farmland. It currently irrigates 26,920 hectares (66,500 acres) in Nueva Ecija and 55,000 hectares (140,000 acres) in Pampanga. The Aquino government laid seven billion pesos to further enlarge the irrigation capacity of Casecnan which was planned to irrigate an additional 20,231 hectares (49,990 acres) of land in Nueva Ecija and another 40,000 hectares (99,000 acres) in Pampanga by its completion in 2016.

== See also ==
- Casecnan Protected Landscape
- Water supply and sanitation in the Philippines
- Energy in the Philippines
