= DWNE =

Philippine radio station

- Palayan; Philippines
- Broadcast area: Nueva Ecija and surrounding areas
- Frequency: 900 kHz
- Branding: DWNE 900

Programming
- Language: Filipino
- Format: Government Radio

Ownership
- Owner: Nueva Ecija Provincial Government

History
- First air date: 1981
- Call sign meaning: Nueva Ecija

Technical information
- Licensing authority: NTC
- Class: C, D, E
- Power: 5,000 watts

DWNE (900 AM) is a radio station owned and operated by the Government of Nueva Ecija. The station's studio and transmitter are located in Brgy. Singalat, Palayan. It serves as a community radio station of Nueva Ecija.

Since 2017, select programs are aired on TV48 under the DWNE Teleradyo block.
