= Pampanga River =

River in central Luzon, Philippines

Pampanga River Rio Grande de Pampanga
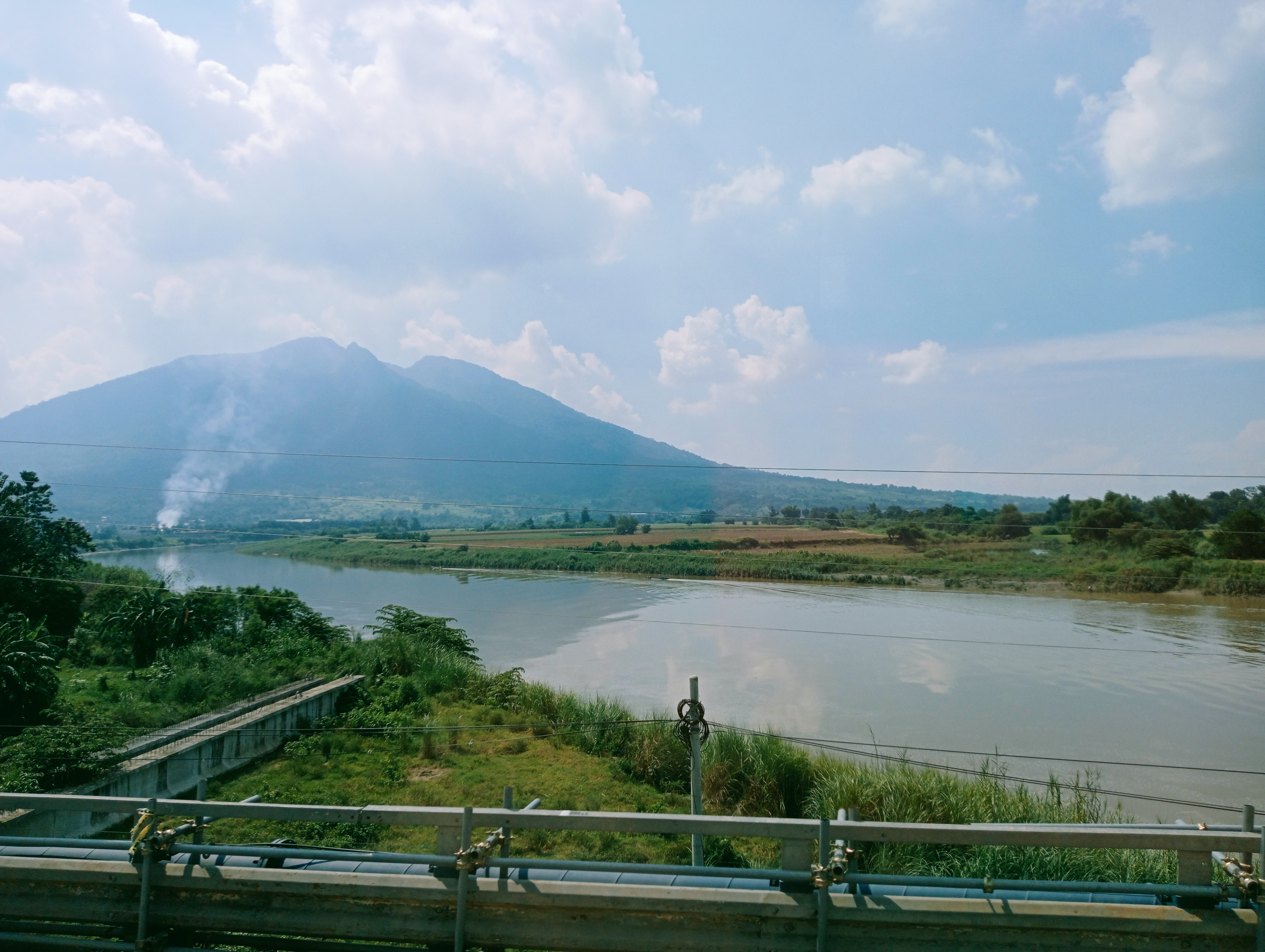
- The river with Mount Arayat in the background

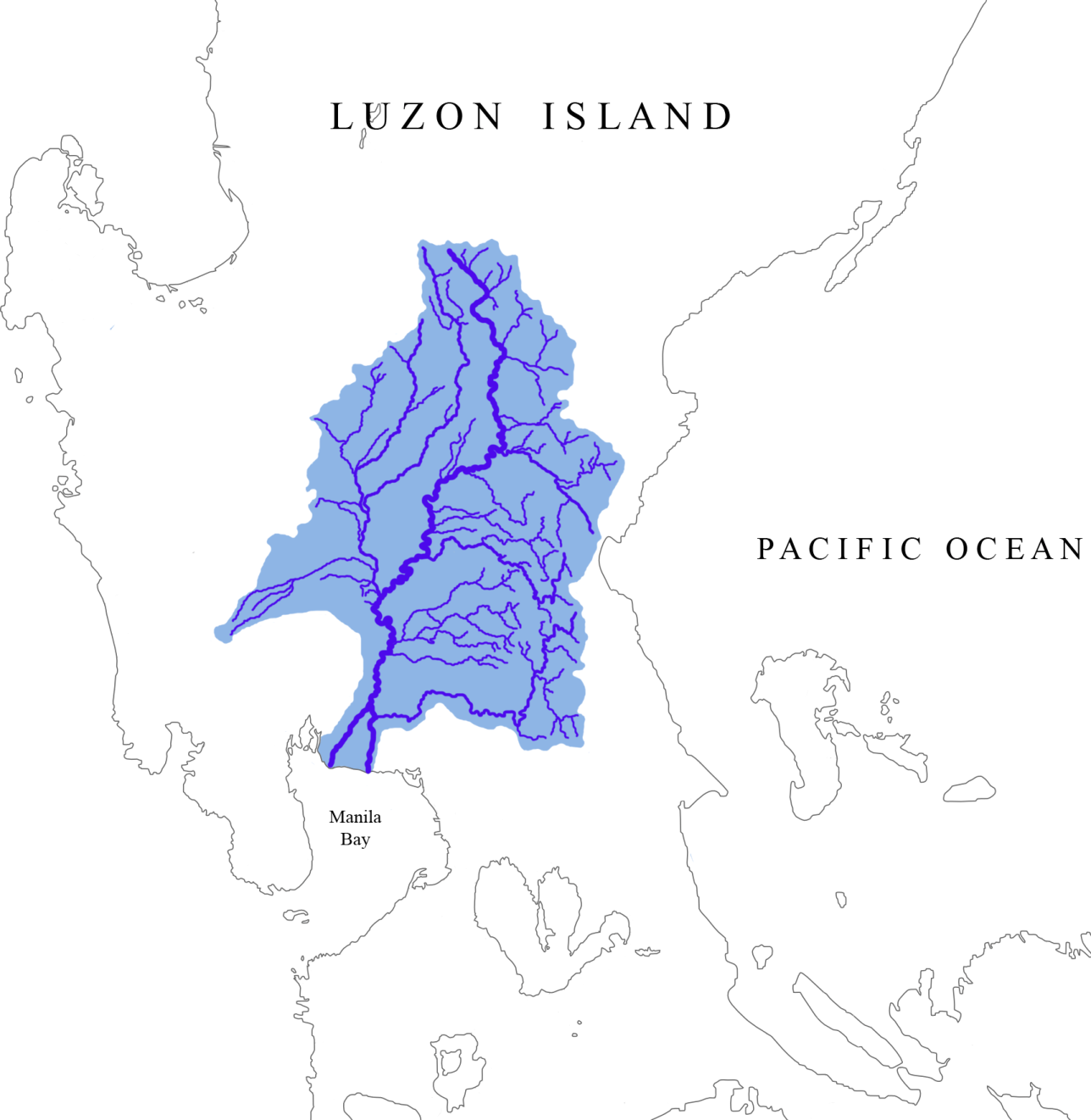
- Pampanga River drainage area

- Pampanga River mouth Pampanga River (Philippines)

Location
- Country: Philippines
- Region: Central Luzon
- Province: Pampanga; Bulacan; Nueva Ecija
- City: Cabanatuan; Palayan

Physical characteristics
- Source
  - location: Sierra Madre, Central Luzon
- Mouth: Manila Bay
  - location: Hagonoy, Bulacan
  - coordinates: 14°46′11″N 120°39′16″E
  - elevation: 0 m (0 ft)
- Length: 270 km (170 mi) Pampanga–Pantabangan River System.; 246 km (153 mi) Pampanga River, source in Gabaldon.
- Basin size: 10,434 km^{2} (4,029 sq mi)
- Discharge
  - average: 692 m^{3}/s (24,400 cu ft/s)
  - maximum: 5,000 m^{3}/s (180,000 cu ft/s)

Basin features
- Tributaries
  - left: Angat River, Peñaranda River, Madlum River
  - right: Dupinga River, Pantabangan River, Talavera River

The Pampanga River is the second largest river on the island of Luzon in the Philippines (next to the Cagayan River) and the country's fifth longest river. It is in the Central Luzon region and traverses the provinces of Pampanga, Bulacan, and Nueva Ecija.

== Topography ==
Its headwaters are at the Sierra Madre and runs a south and southwesterly course for about 261 kilometres (162 mi) until it drains into Manila Bay.

The river's basin covers an area of 10,434 square kilometres (4,029 sq mi), including the allied basin Pampanga River and via the Labangan Channel into Manila Bay.

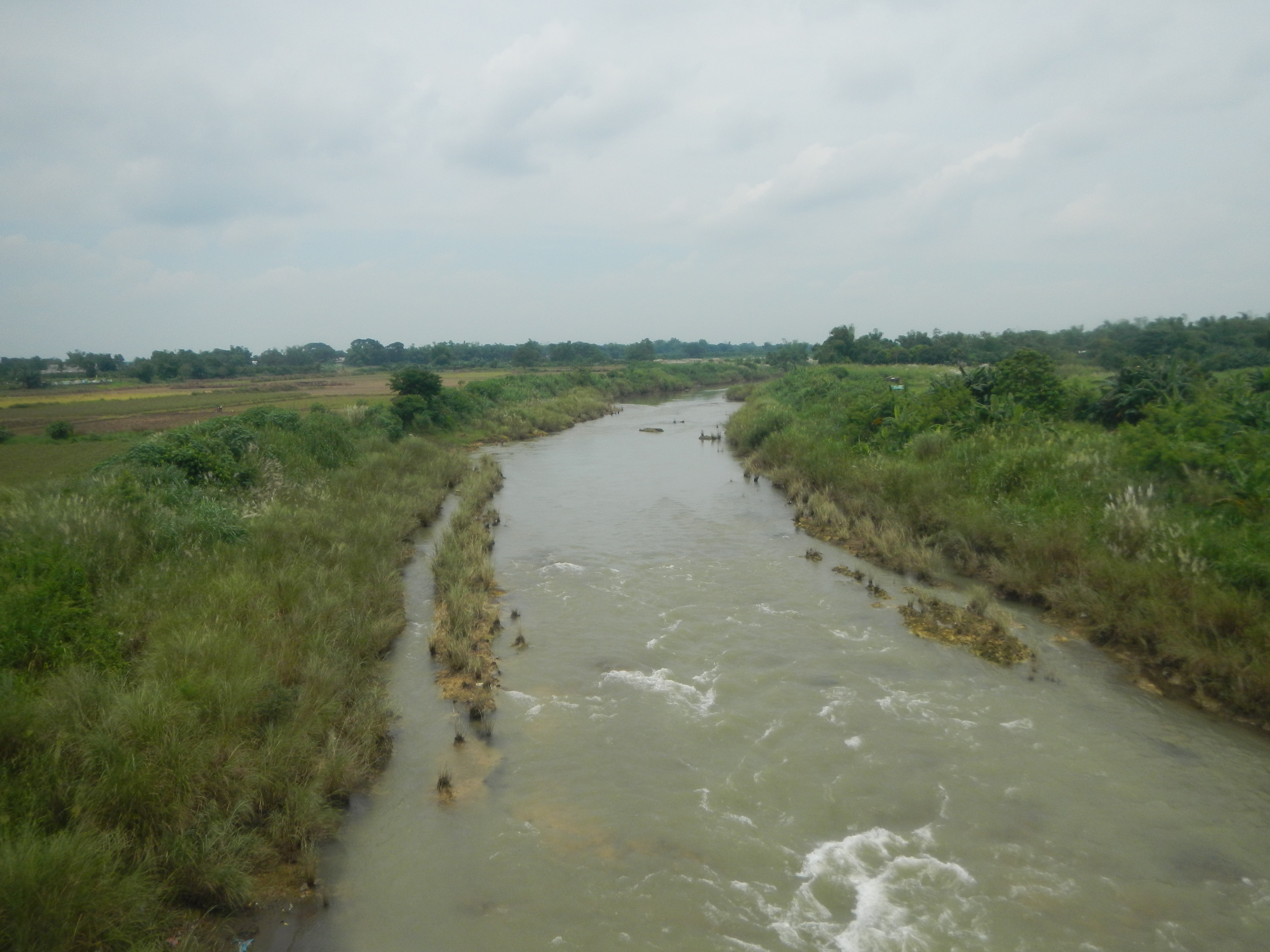
Great Pampanga River (view from San Leonardo, Nueva Ecija bridge)

Its main tributaries are the Peñaranda and the Coronel-Santor rivers on the eastern side of the basin and the Chico River from the northwest side. The Angat River joins the Pampanga River at Calumpit, Bulacan via the Bagbag River. Mount Arayat stands in the middle of the basin.

Southeast of Mount Arayat and the Pampanga River is the Candaba Swamp, covering an area of some 250 square kilometres (97 sq mi) absorbing most of the flood flows from the western slopes of a portion of the Sierra Madre and the overflowing of the Pampanga River via the Cabiao Floodway. This area is submerged during the rainy season but is relatively dry during summer.

== Flooding ==
The basin experiences, on an average, at least one flooding in a year. The dry season generally occurs from December to May and wet the rest of the year. The wettest months are from July to September. The Pampanga River Basin could handle between 100 and 130 millimetres (3.9 and 5.1 in) of 24-hour rainfall.

Extensive flooding occurred at the Pampanga River Basin in July 1962, May 1966, May 1976, October 1993, August 2003, August 2004, late September–October 2009, and August 2012.

The flooding in September 2011 associated with Pedring (Typhoon Nesat) nearly swallowed all of Pampanga and southern parts of Bulacan.

Very catastrophic and exceptionally severe flooding in the river basin that engulfed the Central Luzon provinces of Pangasinan, Pampanga, Bulacan, Nueva Ecija, and Tarlac occurred in July and August 1972. The 1972 flooding was so extensive that it flooded out 14 provinces throughout Northern and Central Luzon, plus Metro Manila and Southern Tagalog. The Pampanga River Basin and the Agno River Basin converged over Tarlac, submerging that province.

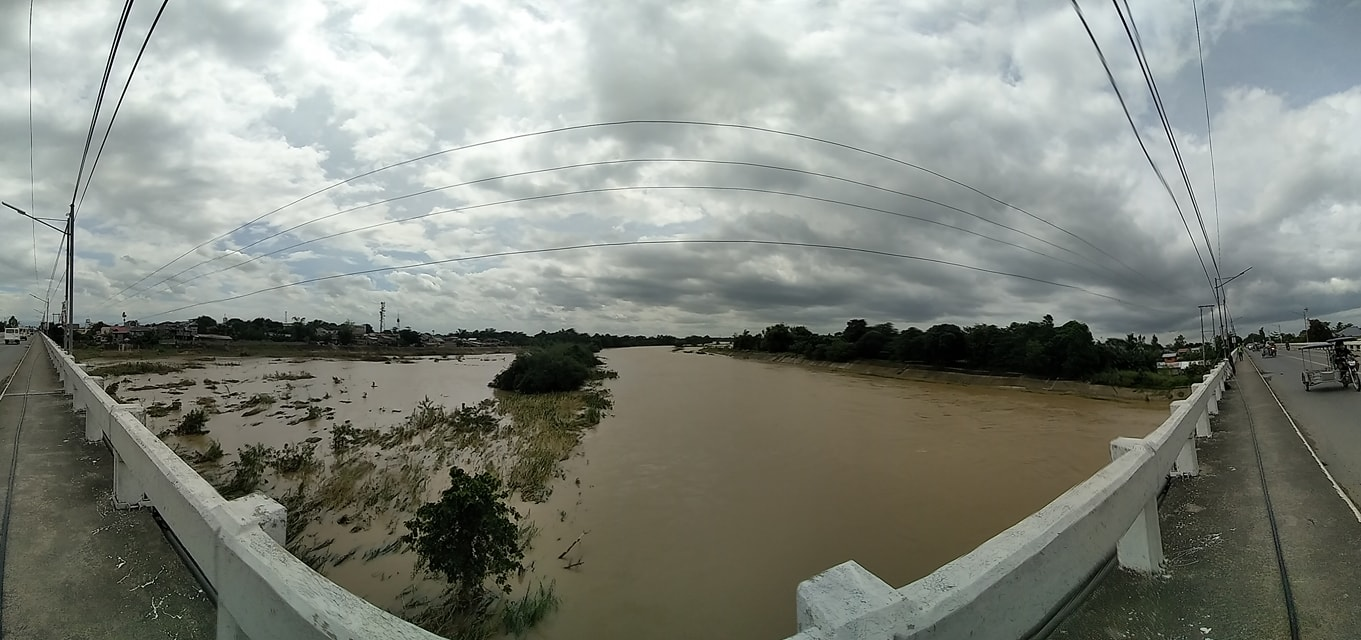
Flooding of Pampanga River floodplain after Typhoon Quinta, 2020 (view from Santa Rosa, Nueva Ecija bridge)

== Economic importance ==
At the higher sections of the basin, dams — especially the Pantabangan Dam in Pantabangan, Nueva Ecija — provide irrigation for farms in the province of Nueva Ecija.

At the lower sections of the basin, where the Pampanga delta lies, the Pampanga River system divides into small branches, crisscrossed with fishponds to form a network of sluggish, tidal flats and canals, which eventually find their way to Manila Bay.

With the anticipated completion of the Pampanga Delta Project, it is expected that flood flows at the lower section of the Pampanga River will recede at a much faster rate.

== Crossings ==
This is listed from mouth to source.

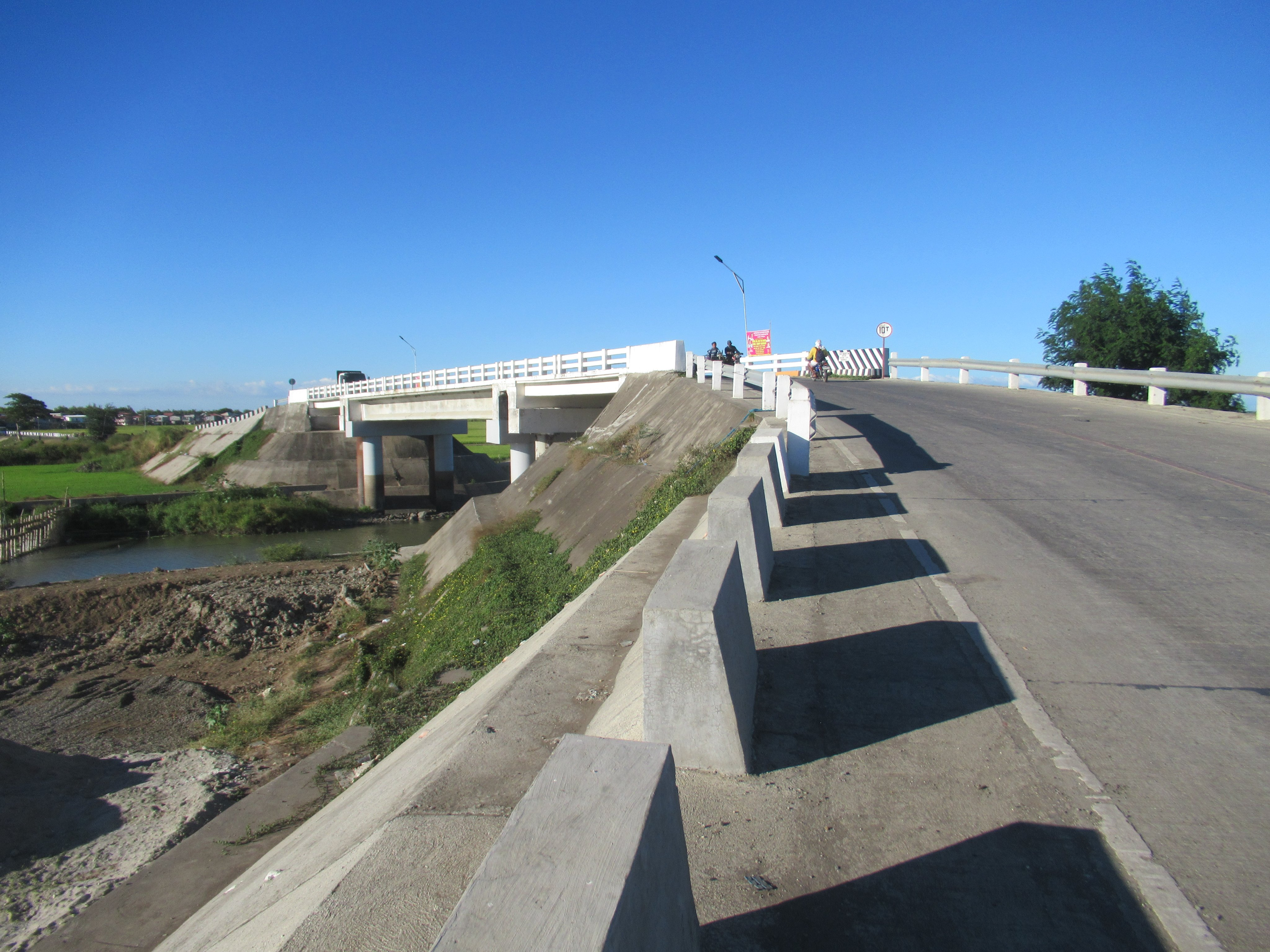
Candaba (San Agustin) Bridge-Malisik River in 2024

1. Pampanga Delta Bridge
2. Sulipan Bridge ( N2 (MacArthur Highway), Apalit)
3. Candaba Viaduct (Pulilan–Apalit Bridge) ( E1 (North Luzon Expressway), Apalit)
4. San Simon Bridge (San Simon)
5. San Luis Bridge (San Luis)
6. Candaba (San Agustin) Bridge (Candaba–Baliuag Road, Candaba)
7. Candaba Bridge (Candaba–Santa Ana Road, Candaba)
8. San Agustin Bridge ( N3 (Jose Abad Santos Avenue), Arayat, Pampanga)
9. Sta. Isabel Cabiao Bridge (Cabiao)
10. Jaen Bridge (San Anton–Poblacion Road, Jaen–San Leonardo boundary)
11. Santa Rosa Bridge ( N58 (Santa Rosa–Tarlac Road), Santa Rosa)
12. Cesar Vergara Bridge (Felipe Vergara Highway, Cabanatuan)
13. Valdefuente Bridge ( AH26 (Pan-Philippine Highway), Cabanatuan)
14. Bangkerohan Bridge (Nueva Ecija–Aurora Road, Bongabon–Palayan boundary)
15. Palayan–Gabaldon–Dingalan Road (Laur–Gabaldon boundary)
16. Dupinga Bridge ( N114 (Palayan–Gabaldon–Dingalan Road), Gabaldon, Nueva Ecija)
