= XHSCAT-FM =

Community radio station in Villa de Álvarez, Colima, Mexico

- Villa de Álvarez, Colima; Mexico
- Frequency: 107.5 MHz
- Branding: Radio Colima

Programming
- Format: Community radio

Ownership
- Owner: Organización de Radios Comunitarias de Occidente, A.C.
- Sister stations: XHZV-FM Zapotitlán de Vadillo, Jalisco

History
- First air date: July 2019
- Call sign meaning: (templated callsign)

Technical information
- Class: A
- ERP: 1.126 kW
- HAAT: -41.3 m
- Transmitter coordinates: 19°18′10.59″N 103°44′29.98″W

XHSCAT-FM is a community radio station on 107.5 FM serving Villa de Álvarez, Colima City, Comala, Coquimatlán and Cuauhtémoc in the Mexican state of Colima. The station is owned by Organización de Radios Comunitarias de Occidente, A.C., which also serves as a national organization representing community radio stations.

== History ==
Organización de Radios Comunitarias de Occidente filed for a community station on October 13, 2016. The station was awarded on April 11, 2018.
