= XHPCO-FM =

Community radio station in Paracho, Michoacán

Paracho, Michoacán; Mexico
- Frequency: 107.5 MHz
- Branding: Radio Mintzita

Ownership
- Owner: Radio Mintzita, S.C.

History
- First air date: February 19, 2010 (permit)
- Call sign meaning: ParaChO

Technical information
- ERP: .01 kW
- Transmitter coordinates: 19.647029°N 102.040348°W

Links
- Webcast: radiomintzita1075.radio12345.com
- Website: radiomintzita.blogspot.com

XHPCO-FM is a community radio station on 107.5 FM in Paracho, Michoacán. It is known as Radio Mintzita.

XHPCO was permitted on February 19, 2010.
