= KYZK =

- Sun Valley, Idaho; United States
- Frequency: 107.5 MHz
- Branding: Mountain Country 107.5

Programming
- Format: Classic country
- Affiliations: ABC Radio

Ownership
- Owner: Richard Mecham; (Magic Valley Media, LLC)

History
- First air date: 2000

Technical information
- Licensing authority: FCC
- Facility ID: 1164
- Class: C1
- ERP: 2,500 watts
- HAAT: 583 meters
- Transmitter coordinates: 43°38′37″N 114°23′50″W

Links
- Public license information: Public file; LMS

KYZK (107.5 FM, "Mountain Country 107.5") is a radio station broadcasting a classic country format. Licensed to Sun Valley, Idaho, United States, the station is currently owned by Richard Mecham, through licensee Magic Valley Media, LLC, and features programming from ABC Radio.

On November 16, 2020, KYZK changed their format from contemporary hit radio to classic country, branded as "Mountain Country 107.5".
