= WKYB =

- Perryville, Kentucky; United States
- Frequency: 107.5 MHz
- Branding: "WKYB-FM, Bee Country"

Programming
- Format: Country

Ownership
- Owner: Lincoln-Garrard Broadcasting Co., Inc.

Technical information
- Licensing authority: FCC
- Facility ID: 198726
- Class: A
- ERP: 2,550 watts
- HAAT: 157 metres (515 ft)
- Transmitter coordinates: 37°35′28″N 84°50′43″W

Links
- Public license information: Public file; LMS
- Webcast: Listen Live
- Website: www.wkybfm.com

WKYB (107.5 FM) is a radio station licensed to serve the community of Perryville, Kentucky. The station is owned by Lincoln-Garrard Broadcasting Co., Inc., and airs a country music format.

The station was assigned the WKYB call letters by the Federal Communications Commission on December 14, 2015.
