= Palayan =

Capital city of Nueva Ecija, Philippines

- Component city
- City of Palayan
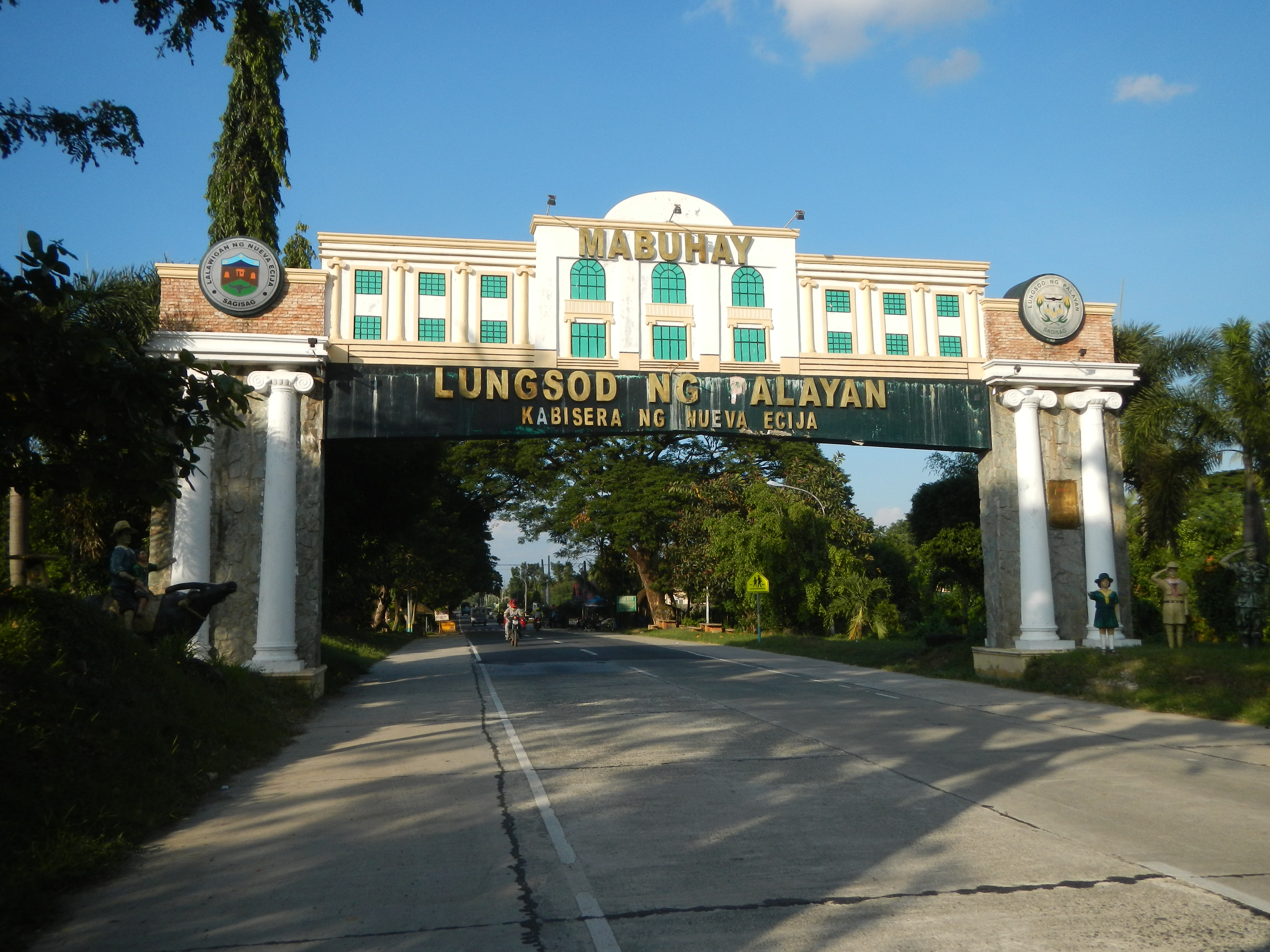
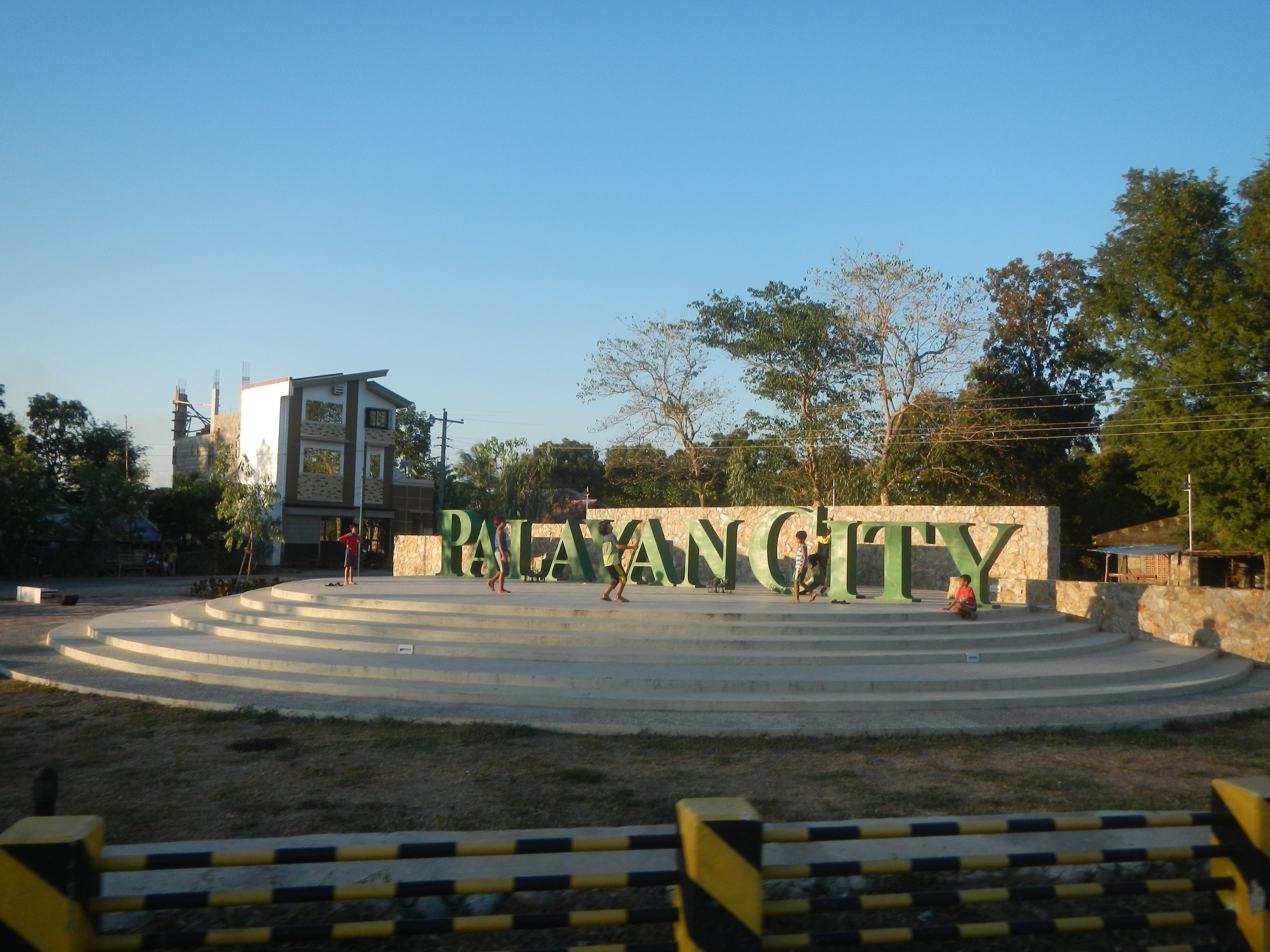
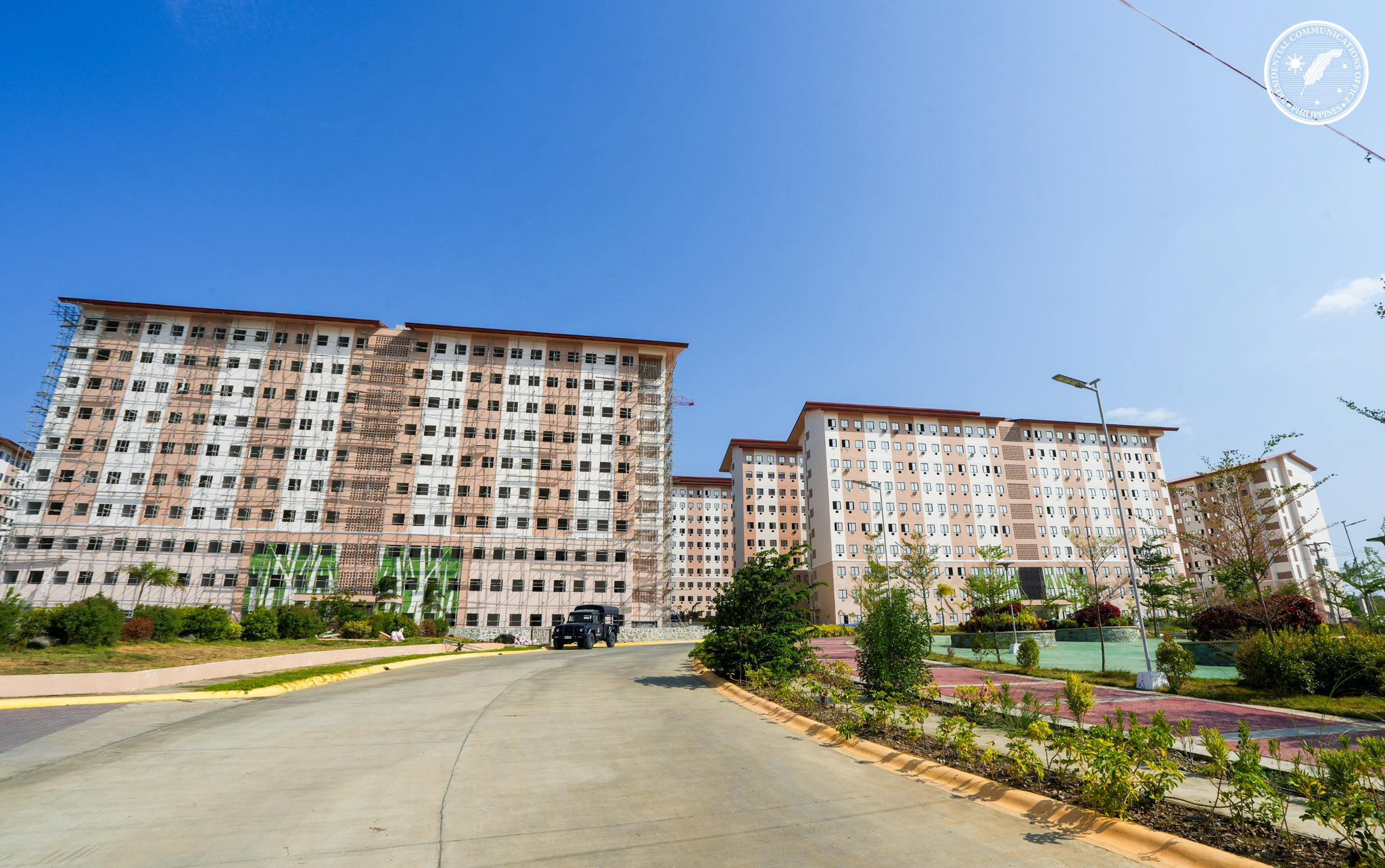
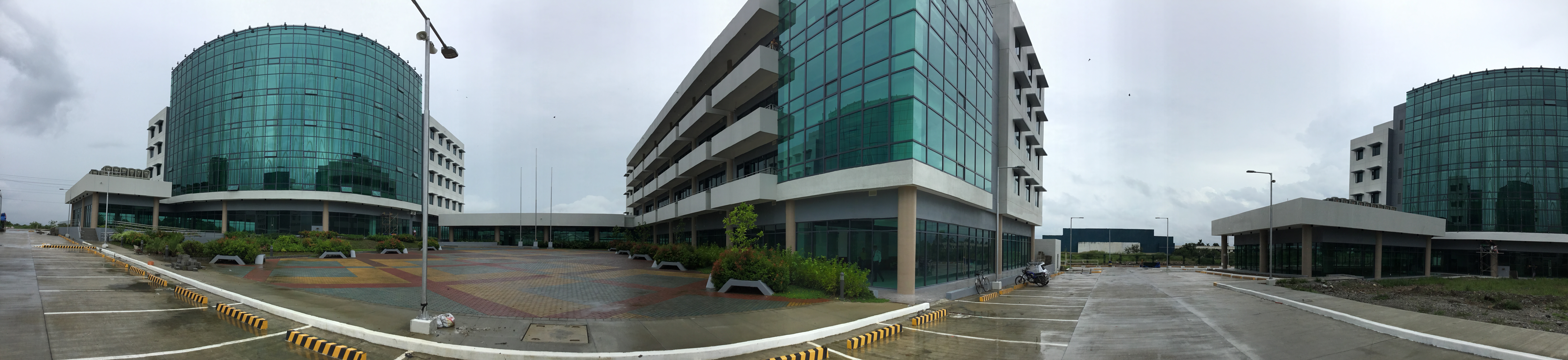
- (From top, left to right): Provincial Capitol of Nueva Ecija, City Center Welcome Sign, Road in Brgy. Imelda Valley, Palayan City Business Park

- Flag Seal
- Motto: Kilos Palayano, Aasenso Tayo (Move for Progress, Palayanese)
- Map of Nueva Ecija with Palayan highlighted
- Interactive map of Palayan
- Location within the Philippines
- Coordinates: 15°32′32″N 121°05′04″E
- Country: Philippines
- Region: Central Luzon
- Province: Nueva Ecija
- District: 3rd district
- Foundation and cityhood: June 19, 1965
- Barangays: 19 (see Barangays)

Government
  - Type: Sangguniang Panlungsod
  - Mayor: Viandrei Nicole Joson Cuevas
  - Vice Mayor: Romaric S. Capinpin (NPC)
  - Representative: Julius Cesar V. Vegara (PFP)
  - City Council: Members: Alvin A. Magtalas; Julius M. Sta. Maria; Ken Anthony S. Malang; Pacifico Rico C. Fajardo; Julius E. De Leon; Julius D. Bautista; Victorino L. Rullan; Roda G. Anga-Angan; Edgar V. Valdez; Anita R. Pineda
  - Electorate: 34,738 voters (2025)

Area
  - Total: 101.40 km^{2} (39.15 sq mi)
- Elevation: 173 m (568 ft)
- Highest elevation: 1,413 m (4,636 ft)
- Lowest elevation: 22 m (72 ft)

Population (2024 census)
  - Total: 47,883
  - Density: 472.22/km^{2} (1,223.0/sq mi)
  - Households: 11,193

Economy
  - Income class: 4th city income class
  - Poverty incidence: 13.74% (2023)
  - Revenue: ₱ 635.2 million (2024)
  - Assets: ₱ 1,748 million (2024)
  - Expenditure: ₱ 556.8 million (2024)
  - Liabilities: ₱ 251.7 million (2024)

Service provider
  - Electricity: Nueva Ecija 2 Area 2 Electric Cooperative (NEECO 2 A2)
- Time zone: UTC+8 (PST)
- ZIP code: 3132
- PSGC: 034919000
- IDD : area code: +63 (0)44
- Native languages: Tagalog; Ilocano
- Website: www.palayancity.gov.ph

Palayan, officially the City of Palayan (Tagalog: Lungsod ng Palayan, Ilocano: Siudad ti Palayan), is a component city and capital of the province of Nueva Ecija, Philippines. According to the 2024 census, it has a population of 47,883 people, making it the least populated city in the Philippines.

Palayan was created on June 19, 1965, by the Congress of the Philippines and is one of seven planned cities in the Philippines (the other six being Manila, Baguio, Quezon City, Trece Martires, Koronadal and the Island Garden City of Samal).

The new provincial capitol, convention center, and sports center of Nueva Ecija are located in the city.

Palayan is 14 kilometers (8.7 mi) from Cabanatuan, 130 kilometers (81 mi) from Manila, and 102 kilometers (63 mi) from Baler.

== History ==
On March 25, 1952, a special consultation meeting was conducted by Governor Leopoldo Diaz along with Congressman Jesus Ilagan, Board Members Dioscoro de Leon and Antonio Corpuz, Don Felipe Buencamino, and the municipal mayors of Nueva Ecija to discuss the transfer the provincial capital from Cabanatuan. As a result, the group unanimously agreed to establish the new capital on the site of the Government Stock Farm located within the municipalities of Laur and Bongabon. The municipalities of Gapan, San Jose, Santa Rosa, Guimba, Talavera, General Tinio, Baloc (Santo Domingo), and Muñoz were also considered as potential sites for the new capital.

In 1955, President Ramon Magsaysay declared a portion of the Government Stock Farm open for settlement pursuant to Presidential Proclamation No. 237.

On June 19, 1965, the Congress of the Philippines enacted Republic Act No. 4475 creating Palayan City and designating it as the new capital of Nueva Ecija. "Palayan" (rice paddy) was chosen as the name of the new provincial capital to reflect the moniker bestowed upon the province of Nueva Ecija as the “Rice Granary of the Philippines”. The city government was constituted on December 5, 1965, with then Governor Eduardo L. Joson acting as the city's ex-officio Mayor, while the Provincial Board constituted the first City Council. Under this administration, the Iglesia ni Cristo (INC) purchased a large tract of land at the city's parameters near Laur to house INC members from Hacienda Luisita due to conflicts arising from union disbandments.

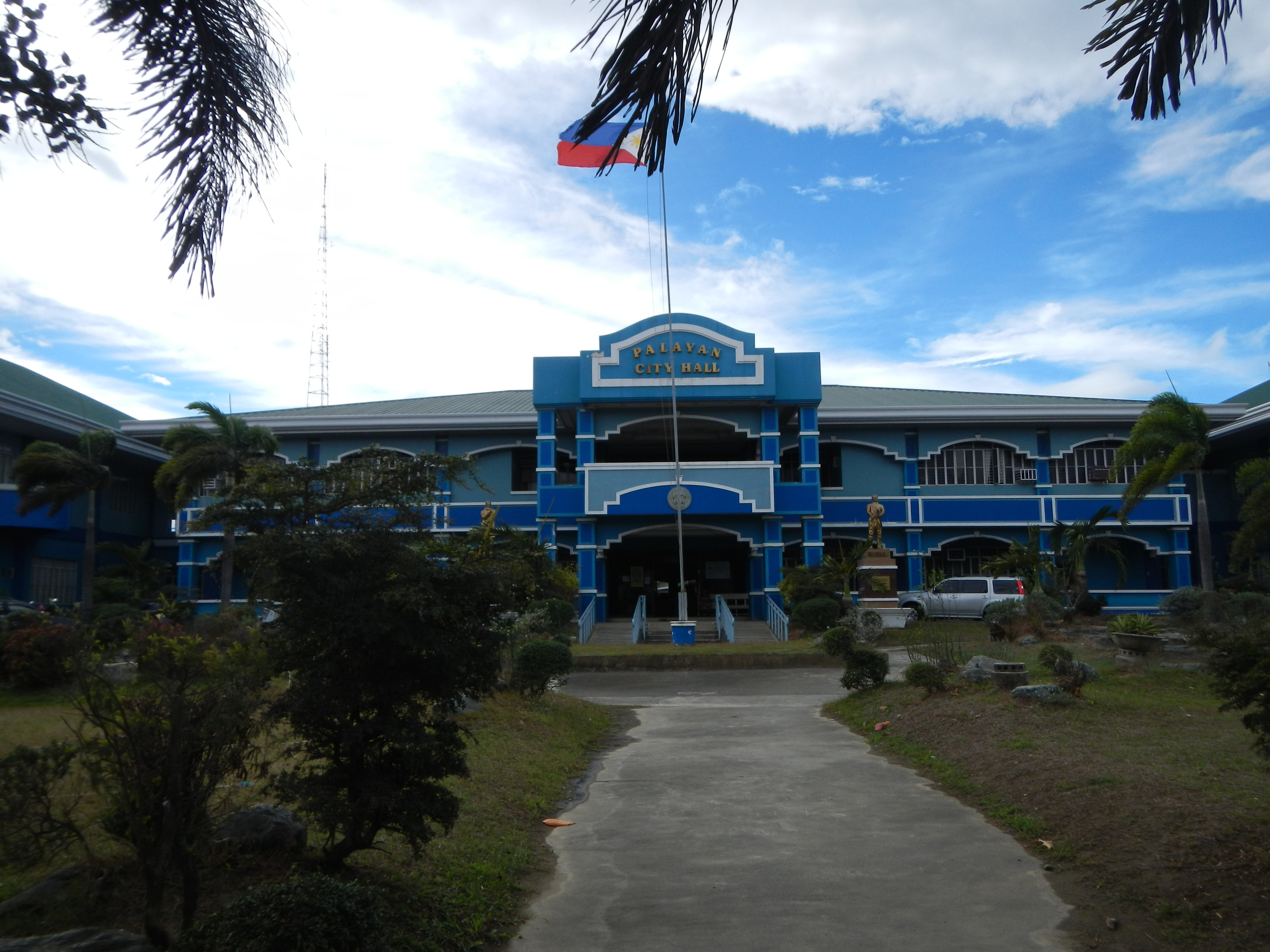
Palayan City Hall

In 1969, Mayor Elpidio Cucio and Vice Mayor Felipe Bautista, initially appointed to their respective offices, were among the first elected local officials of the city, along with Councilors Flor Agustin, Tranquilino dela Cruz, Antonio Pascual, Federico Dacanay, Luis Lacalle, and Thomas Lumawig. The city also hosted the National Boy Scout Jamboree which was attended by thousands of local and foreign scouts at the time.

In August 1969, the city was enlarged by virtue of Republic Act No. 6052, authored by then Congressman Angel Concepcion (Nueva Ecija 2nd), which provided for the inclusion of the Military Reservation in Laur and the Fort Magsaysay cantonment area located in Santa Rosa.

In 1972, by virtue of Proclamation No. 893, a portion of the Government Stock Farm was allocated for the displaced population of Pantabangan following the construction of the Pantabangan Dam. The resettlement site was eventually converted into Barangay Marcos Village.

In 1983, the training ground of the Philippine Army was transferred from Fort Bonifacio in Metro Manila to Fort Ramon Magsaysay. This paved the way for the development of the reservation area into a training complex to serve the army's training requirements.

In 1993, the Asianwide Green Scouts Movement was founded during the first Philippines-Japan Bilateral Ecology Work Camp held in the city. The event also led to the establishment of the projects Kawayang Buhay and the Asian Ecology Forest which is supported by the Asian Friendship Society.

In 1995, Barangay Popolon, formerly a barangay of Bongabon, was annexed into the city by virtue of Republic Act No. 8030. This was ratified in a plebiscite held on October 1, 1995. Moreover, Bagong Buhay, one of the three resettlement areas in the city, was converted to a regular barangay after a plebiscite on November 26, 1995.

The new provincial capitol building of Nueva Ecija was completed in 2002, solidifying the city's status as both the de facto and de jure capital of the province. The old provincial capitol is located on Burgos Avenue, Cabanatuan, and is still utilized by the provincial government.

== Geography ==
=== Barangays ===
Palayan City is politically subdivided into 20 barangays. Each barangay consists of puroks and some have sitios.

- Atate
- Aulo
- Bagong Buhay
- Bo. Militar (Fort Magsaysay)
- Caballero (Poblacion)
- Caimito (Poblacion)
- Doña Josefa
- Ganaderia (Poblacion)
- Imelda Valley I
- Imelda Valley II
- Langka
- Malate (Poblacion)
- Maligaya
- Manacnac
- Mapaet
- Marcos Village
- Popolon (Pagas)
- Santolan (Poblacion)
- Sapang Buho
- Singalat

=== Climate ===
Climate data for Palayan City, Nueva Ecija
Month	Jan	Feb	Mar	Apr	May	Jun	Jul	Aug	Sep	Oct	Nov	Dec	Year
Mean daily maximum °C (°F)	29 (84)	30 (86)	31 (88)	33 (91)	33 (91)	31 (88)	30 (86)	29 (84)	29 (84)	30 (86)	30 (86)	29 (84)	30 (87)
Mean daily minimum °C (°F)	19 (66)	19 (66)	20 (68)	22 (72)	23 (73)	24 (75)	24 (75)	24 (75)	23 (73)	22 (72)	21 (70)	20 (68)	22 (71)
Average precipitation mm (inches)	36 (1.4)	34 (1.3)	36 (1.4)	41 (1.6)	202 (8.0)	282 (11.1)	418 (16.5)	393 (15.5)	340 (13.4)	237 (9.3)	99 (3.9)	90 (3.5)	2,208 (86.9)
Average rainy days	2.5	3.0	4.1	6.3	15.8	19.4	22.5	21.6	20.1	17.5	9.6	4.0	146.4
Source: Meteoblue

== Demographics ==
Population census of Palayan
Year	Pop.	±% p.a.
1970	8,382	—
1975	12,140	+7.71%
1980	14,959	+4.26%
1990	20,393	+3.15%
1995	26,851	+5.29%
2000	31,253	+3.31%
2007	32,790	+0.66%
2010	37,219	+4.72%
2015	41,041	+1.88%
2020	45,383	+2.14%
2024	47,883	+1.30%
Source: Philippine Statistics Authority

== Economy ==
Poverty incidence of Palayan (%)

Source: Philippine Statistics Authority

== Government Officials ==
2025-2028 Palayan City Officials
Position	Name	Party
Mayor	Viandrei Nicole J. Cuevas	NPC
Vice Mayor	Romaric S. Capinpin	NPC
Councilors	Alvin A. Magtalas	NPC
Councilors	Julius M. Sta. Maria	NPC
Councilors	Ken Anthony S. Malang	NPC
Councilors	Pacifico Rico C. Fajardo	NPC
Councilors	Julius E. De Leon	NPC
Councilors	Julius D. Bautista	NPC
Councilors	Victorino L. Rullan	NPC
Councilors	Roda G. Anga-Angan	NPC
Councilors	Edgar V. Valdez	Independent
Councilors	Anita R. Pineda	NPC
Ex Officio Municipal Council Members
ABC President	TBD	Nonpartisan
SK Federation President	TBD	Nonpartisan

== Sister cities ==
- (Philippines) Tagaytay
- (Philippines) Virac, Catanduanes
- (Philippines) Tayabas, Quezon

== Gallery ==
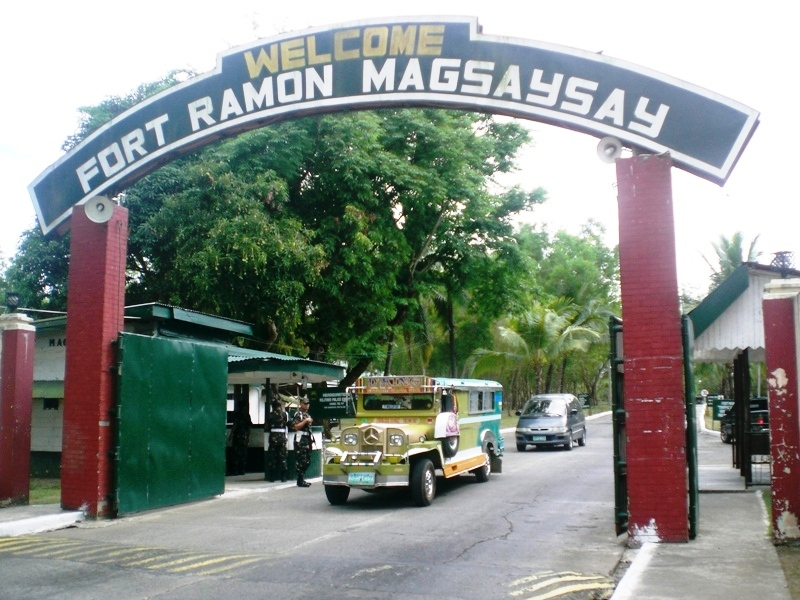
Fort Magsaysay

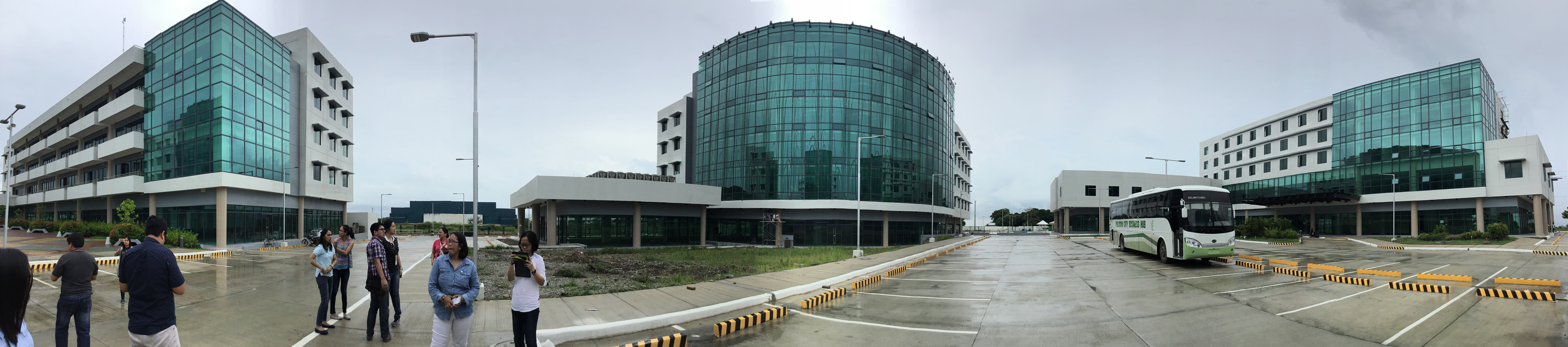
Panorama of the Palayan City business park

Preceded by Cabanatuan	Capital of Nueva Ecija; 1965–present	Incumbent
