= WBFC-LP =

- Boynton, Georgia; United States
- Frequency: 107.5 MHz

Programming
- Format: Southern gospel

Ownership
- Owner: Boynton Low Power Broadcasting, Inc.

History
- Former frequencies: 103.7 MHz (2004–2014)

Technical information
- Licensing authority: FCC
- Facility ID: 124312
- Class: L1
- ERP: 15 watts
- HAAT: 129.3 meters (424 ft)
- Transmitter coordinates: 34°53′27″N 85°10′07″W

Links
- Public license information: LMS
- Webcast: Listen Live

WBFC-LP (107.5 FM) is an American low-power FM radio station licensed to serve the community of Boynton, Georgia. The station is currently owned by Boynton Low Power Broadcasting, Inc. It broadcasts a Southern gospel format.
