= WPZM-LP =

Radio station in Gainesville, Florida

- Gainesville, Florida; United States
- Frequency: 107.5 MHz
- Branding: Praize 107.5 (sic)

Programming
- Format: Black gospel
- Affiliations: Praize 107.7

Ownership
- Owner: Community Praise Center

Technical information
- Licensing authority: FCC
- Facility ID: 133183
- Class: L1
- ERP: 18 watts
- HAAT: 70.2 meters (230 ft)
- Transmitter coordinates: 29°41′34.00″N 82°19′55.00″W

Links
- Public license information: LMS
- Website: praize1075.com/about-us/

WPZM-LP (107.5 FM) is a radio station broadcasting a religious radio format. Licensed to Gainesville, Florida, United States, the station is currently owned by the Community Praise Center.
