= KZIG =

- Wapanucka, Oklahoma; United States
- Frequency: 107.5 MHz
- Branding: The Rock

Programming
- Format: Classic rock

Ownership
- Owner: Keystone Broadcasting Corporation

Technical information
- Licensing authority: FCC
- Facility ID: 183342
- Class: A
- ERP: 2,300 watts
- HAAT: 117.6 metres (386 ft)
- Transmitter coordinates: 34°25′8.3″N 96°11′25″W

Links
- Public license information: Public file; LMS
- Website: kzigradio.com

KZIG (107.5 FM, "The Rock") is a radio station licensed to serve the community of Wapanucka, Oklahoma. The station is owned by Keystone Broadcasting Corporation and airs a classic rock format.

The station was assigned the KZIG call letters by the Federal Communications Commission on February 18, 2013.
