= KQBO =

Radio station in Rio Grande City, Texas

- Rio Grande City, Texas; United States
- Broadcast area: Rio Grande Valley
- Frequency: 107.5 MHz
- Branding: Power

Programming
- Format: Urban adult contemporary

Ownership
- Owner: Sound Investments Unlimited, Inc.

History
- First air date: 1981
- Former call signs: KCTM (1981–2003)
- Former frequencies: 103.1 MHz (1981–1999)

Technical information
- Licensing authority: FCC
- Facility ID: 60885
- Class: C2
- ERP: 12,000 watts
- HAAT: 303 meters (994 ft)
- Transmitter coordinates: 26°31′01″N 98°39′07″W

Links
- Public license information: Public file; LMS
- Website: lapatrona1075fm.com

KQBO (107.5 FM) is a radio station licensed to Rio Grande City, Texas, United States. The station broadcasts a Regional Mexican format and is owned by Sound Investments Unlimited, Inc.
