= WNHA-LP =

Currently silent
- New Haven, Connecticut; United States
- Broadcast area: Greater New Haven
- Frequency: 107.5 MHz
- Branding: Alma Radio 107.5

Programming
- Format: Spanish religious

Ownership
- Owner: Alma Radio Inc.

Technical information
- Licensing authority: FCC
- Facility ID: 194592
- Class: LP1
- ERP: 18 watts
- HAAT: 53 metres (174 ft)
- Transmitter coordinates: 41°19′00.3″N 72°49′11.4″W

Links
- Public license information: LMS
- Website: almaradio.org

WNHA-LP (107.5 FM, "Alma Radio 107.5") is a radio station licensed to serve the community of New Haven, Connecticut. The station is owned by Alma Radio Inc., and airs a Spanish religious format.

The station was assigned the WNHA-LP call letters by the Federal Communications Commission on November 12, 2014.
