= Boynton, Georgia =

Unincorporated community in the state of Georgia

Coordinates: 34°55′24″N 85°11′27″W

Boynton is an unincorporated community in Catoosa County, in the U.S. state of Georgia.

== History ==
Boynton was originally called "Peavine", and under the latter name, the first permanent settlement was made in 1850. A post office called Boynton was in operation from 1890 until 1903. The community was named for Henry V. Boynton, who helped establish nearby Chickamauga and Chattanooga National Military Park.
