= Pantabangan Dam =

Dam in Nueva Ecija, Philippines

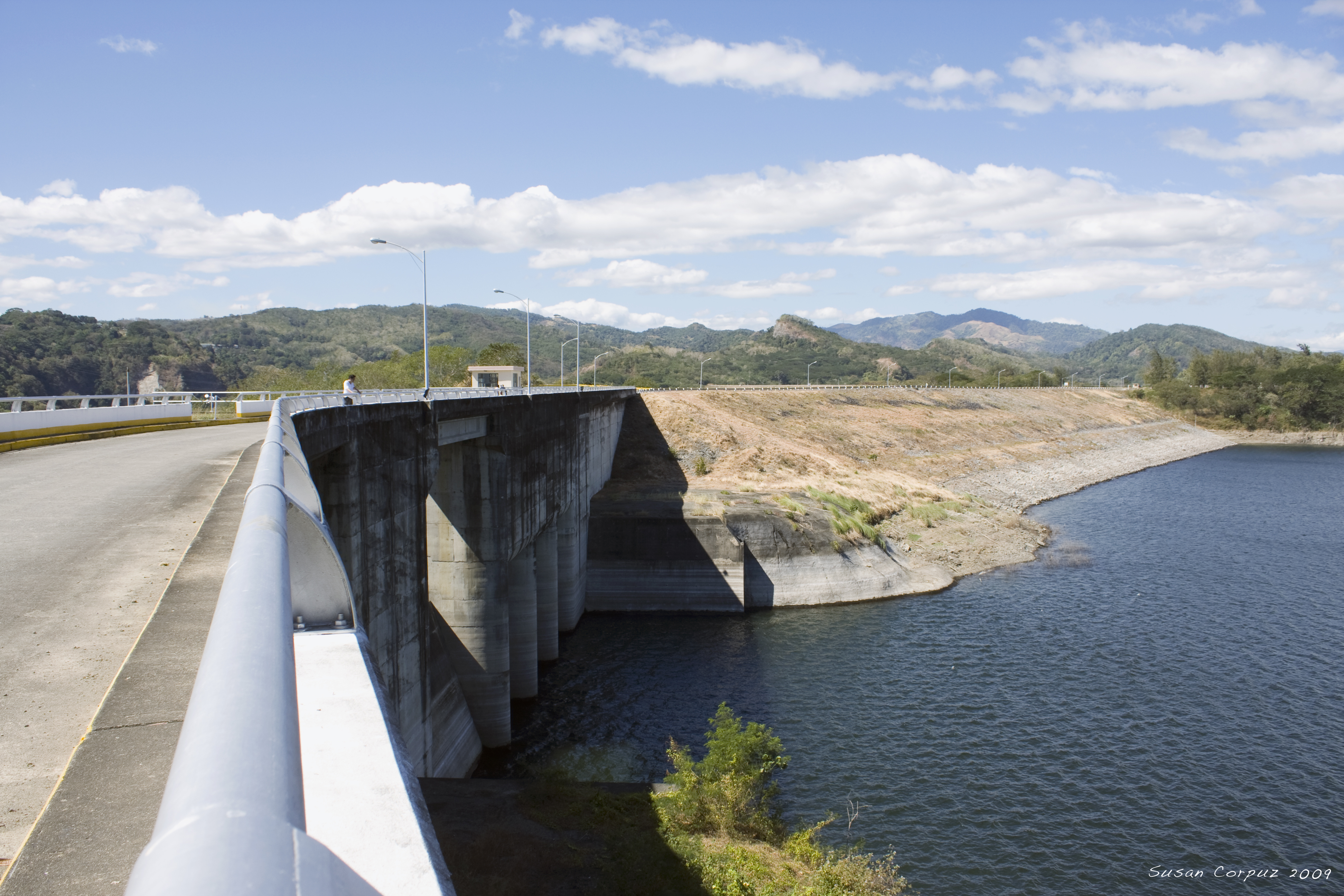
- Behind the dam's spillway

- Location in Nueva Ecija Location in Luzon Location in the Philippines
- Coordinates: 15°48′52″N 121°06′29″E
- Construction began: June 1971
- Opening date: February 1977
- Construction cost: $20.74 Million or 891.82 Million pesos (at current price)
- Owners: National Power Corporation; National Irrigation Administration

Dam and spillways
- Type of dam: Embankment, earth-fill
- Impounds: Pampanga River
- Height: 107 m (351 ft)
- Length: 1,615 m (5,299 ft)
- Elevation at crest: 232 m (761 ft)
- Width (crest): 12 m (39 ft)
- Width (base): 535 m (1,755 ft)
- Dam volume: 12,000,000 cu yd (9,174,658 m^{3})
- Spillways: 3 x radial gates, 1 x overflow
- Spillway capacity: 4,200 m^{3}/s (148,322 cu ft/s)

Reservoir
- Creates: Pantabangan Lake
- Total capacity: 2,996,000,000 m^{3} (2,428,897 acre⋅ft)
- Active capacity: 2,083,000,000 m^{3} (1,688,716 acre⋅ft)
- Catchment area: 853 km^{2} (329 mi^{2})
- Surface area: 69.62 km^{2} (27 mi^{2}) (max)
- Normal elevation: 230 m (755 ft) (max)

Power Station
- Commission date: 1974
- Turbines: 2 x 60 MW Francis-type
- Installed capacity: 100 MW
- Capacity factor: 90%
- Annual generation: 232,000,000 kWh

Pantabangan Dam is an earth-fill embankment dam on the Pampanga River located in Pantabangan in Nueva Ecija province of the Philippines. The multi-purpose dam provides water for irrigation and hydroelectric power generation while its reservoir, Pantabangan Lake, affords flood control. The reservoir is considered one of the largest in Southeast Asia and also one of the cleanest in the Philippines. Construction on the dam began in 1971 and it was completed in 1977.

== History ==
Pantabangan was an old town of around 300 years old. In May 1969, the Congress of the Philippines authorized the development of the Pampanga Basin with Republic Act No. 5499. In October of that year, detailed studies of the Pantabangan site were carried out and the planning of the site lasted two years.

By June 11, 1971, President Ferdinand Marcos oversaw the ground breaking ceremony of the dam site in Palayupay, Pantabangan, Nueva Ecija, to signal the beginning of the construction of the Dam. Approximately 1,300 people were relocated from the town and the dam's reservoir zone, and were settled into locations with rolling and thereforeless productive agricultural land.

The dam finally began actual construction in 1974, and went into operation in February 1977 and its construction was completed later in May.

== Reservoir ==
Since the operations of the dam started in February 1977, the site of the old town of Pantabangan has become visible during times of extremely low water levels in the reservoir coinciding with the El Niño phenomenon, with recorded instances occurring in 1983, 2014, 2020, 2024 and 2026, sparking an influx of visitors to the site, particularly the cross of the Saint Andrew Church constructed in 1825. A modern cross was erected to replace the old one during one of its reappearances. The site, which also contains the ruins of the old public cemetery including headstones, foundations of the old municipal hall with its historical town marker, the town plaza and old tree trunks, has been designated as a cultural heritage zone by the municipal government.

== Design ==
The dam is a 107 m (351 ft) tall and 1,615 m (5,299 ft) long embankment-type with 12,000,000 cu yd (9,174,658 m^{3}) of homogeneous earth-fill and an impervious core. The crest of the dam is 12 m (39 ft) wide while the widest part of its base is 535 m (1,755 ft). The dam's crest sits at an elevation of 232 m (761 ft) and is composed of three sections: the main dam, a saddle dam, and an auxiliary dam located with the spillway. The spillway is a chute-type controlled by three radial gates but equipped with an overflow section as well. The design discharge of the spillway is 4,200 m^{3}/s (148,322 cu ft/s). The dam's reservoir has a gross capacity of 2,996,000,000 m^{3} (2,428,897 acre⋅ft) and 2,083,000,000 m^{3} (1,688,716 acre⋅ft) of that volume is active (or useful) for irrigation and power. The dam sits at the head of a 853 km^{2} (329 mi^{2}) catchment area known as the Pantabangan–Carranglan Watershed Forest Reserve and its reservoir has a surface area of 69.62 km^{2} (27 mi^{2}) and elevation of 230 m (755 ft) when at its maximum level. The reservoir's life is estimated at 107 years due to silt from denudation. The dam was designed to withstand an intensity 8 earthquake.

The power house is located at the base of the main dam and contains two 60 MW Francis turbine-generators for an installed capacity of 120 MW. Each turbine receives water via a 6 m (20 ft) diameter penstock. When the water is discharged, it is released into a 250 m (820 ft) long tailrace channel where it re-enters the river.

=== Pantabangan Aquaculture Park Project ===
In 2024, the Bureau of Fisheries and Aquatic Resources unveiled its strategic 2023 to 2028 plan of Pantabangan Aquaculture Park Project expansion by creating more fish cages made of petroleum-based High-density polyethylene in the Pantabangan reservoir for tilapia grow-out culture.

== See also ==
- Water supply and sanitation in the Philippines
- Energy in the Philippines
