= DWAQ-FM =

Radio station in Legazpi, Philippines

UST Legazpi Radio (DWAQ)
- Legazpi; Philippines
- Broadcast area: Legazpi and surrounding areas
- Frequency: 107.5 MHz
- Branding: UST Legazpi Radio 107.5

Programming
- Languages: English, Filipino
- Format: College radio, Religious radio

Ownership
- Owner: University of Santo Tomas - Legazpi

History
- First air date: May 15, 2015
- Former names: Good News Radio (2015-2025)
- Call sign meaning: Aquinas

Technical information
- Licensing authority: NTC
- Power: 1,000 watts

Links
- Webcast: Radio Garden; Streema
- Website: https://ust-legazpi.edu.ph/

DWAQ (107.5 FM), broadcasting as UST Legazpi Radio 107.5, is a radio station owned and operated by the University of Santo Tomas - Legazpi (formerly Aquinas University of Legazpi). Its studios located inside UST-Legazpi Rawis campus, Brgy. Rawis, Legazpi, Albay and transmitter is located at UST-Legazpi Peak, Brgy. Taysan, Legazpi, Albay.

The station is being used as a laboratory for the Mass Media Communication students of the university and the students of Electronics Communication Engineering, with programming that includes music programs, religious programs, informative segments and talk shows to announce Good News. It serves as the community radio station of UST-Legazpi campus, which has also become the bastion of proclaiming the Good News of Christ and inspiring people.
