= Pantabangan =

Municipality in Nueva Ecija, Philippines

- Municipality
- Municipality of Pantabangan
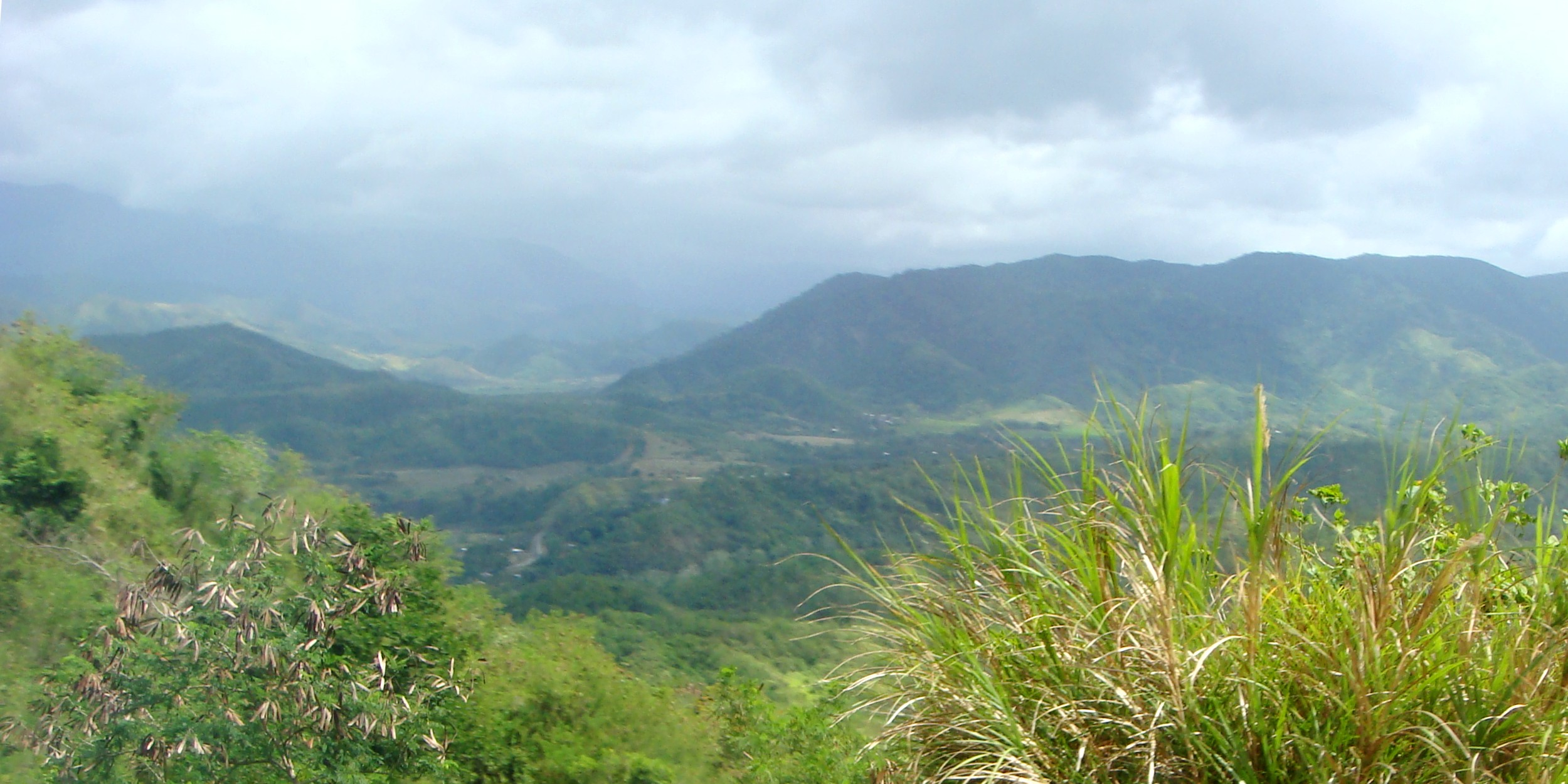
- Mountains in Pantabangan

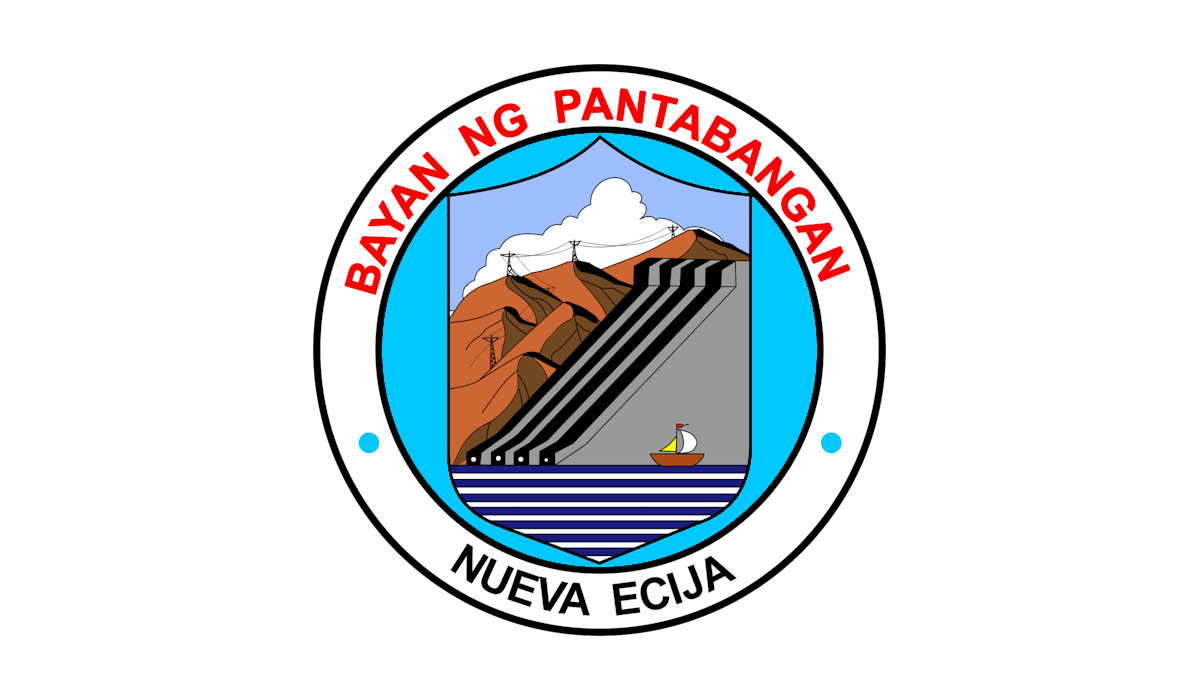
- Flag Seal

- Map of Nueva Ecija with Pantabangan highlighted
- Interactive map of Pantabangan
- Location within the Philippines
- Coordinates: 15°48′31″N 121°08′36″E
- Country: Philippines
- Region: Central Luzon
- Province: Nueva Ecija
- District: 2nd district
- Founded: 1701
- Barangays: 14 (see Barangays)

Government
  - Type: Sangguniang Bayan
  - Mayor: Roberto T. Agdipa
  - Vice Mayor: Monaliza H. Agdipa
  - Representative: Micaela S. Violago
  - Municipal Council: Members: Vladimir S. Poblete; Katherine H. Escuadro; Rodolfo T. Agdipa; Anthony M. Barcelo; Noel D. Barcelo; Marife M. Palad; Celestino T. Sadaba; Mida A. Uera
  - Electorate: 28,627 voters (2025)

Area
  - Total: 392.56 km^{2} (151.57 sq mi)
- Elevation: 260 m (850 ft)
- Highest elevation: 547 m (1,795 ft)
- Lowest elevation: 107 m (351 ft)

Population (2024 census)
  - Total: 32,694
  - Density: 83.284/km^{2} (215.70/sq mi)
  - Households: 7,213

Economy
  - Income class: 1st municipal income class
  - Poverty incidence: 17.12% (2023)
  - Revenue: ₱ 301 million (2024)
  - Assets: ₱ 1,614 million (2024)
  - Expenditure: ₱ 346.1 million (2024)
  - Liabilities: ₱ 484.7 million (2024)

Service provider
  - Electricity: Pantabangan Municipal Electric System (PAMES)
- Time zone: UTC+8 (PST)
- ZIP code: 3124
- PSGC: 0304920000
- IDD : area code: +63 (0)44
- Native languages: Ilocano; Tagalog
- Catholic diocese: Diocese of San Jose (Nueva Ecija)
- Patron saint: Andrew the Apostle

Pantabangan, officially the Municipality of Pantabangan, is a municipality in the province of Nueva Ecija, Philippines. According to the 2024 census, it has a population of 32,694 people.

== Etymology ==
Pantabangan (Pantabanganan in early 18th century), may have come from the Ilongot root word sabangan or sabanganan ("junction of water streams"). Toponyms in the area are also from Ilongot, like Caanaoan, Puncan, Cadanglaan (now Carranglan), Kabaritan (now San Jose) and others. Bungamong (Bongabon) and Cadanglaan were formerly sitios of Pantabangan, while Kabaritan was also part of the modern town.

== History ==
=== Early history ===
In the early 16th and 17th centuries, the Id-dules (Aetas or Baluga) and Egongots (Bugkalot) inhabited the southern Sierra Madre and Caraballo Mountains.

=== Establishment ===
Pantabangan was founded on November 30, 1645, by Fr. Juan Alonzo de Abarca, an Augustinian priest with the 29th Spanish mission in the Philippines. The village grew into a settlement and was officially included in the map of the Philippines in 1747. In 1900, Pantabangan formally became a town.

=== World War II ===
At outbreak of the Second World War in the Pacific Theatre, the invading Japanese troops of occupied Pantabangan in 1942. During Liberation three years later, the combined military forces of the Philippine Commonwealth Army, the Philippine Constabulary, the United States Army and the U.S. Army Air Forces recaptured the town and defeated Japanese soldiers in the Battle of Pantabangan.

=== Postwar era ===
In 1950, Sitio Lublub was converted into a barrio in the municipality upon excision from Barrio Marikit. Lublub was then absorbed into Alfonso Castañeda in Nueva Vizcaya upon the latter's creation in 1979.

=== During the Marcos dictatorship ===
The beginning months of the 1970s had marked a period of turmoil and change in the Philippines, as well as in Pantabangan. During his bid to be the first Philippine president to be re-elected for a second term, Ferdinand Marcos launched an unprecedented number of foreign debt-funded public works projects. This caused the Philippine economy to take a sudden downwards turn known as the 1969 Philippine balance of payments crisis, which led to a period of economic difficulty and a significant rise of social unrest.

With only a year left in his last constitutionally allowed term as president, Ferdinand Marcos placed the Philippines under Martial Law in September 1972 and thus retained the position for fourteen more years. This period in Philippine history is remembered for the Marcos administration's record of human rights abuses, particularly targeting political opponents, student activists, journalists, religious workers, farmers, and others who fought against the Marcos dictatorship. This included student activists Fortunato "Toto" Camus and Manuel "Sonny" Hizon Jr., who were killed by Marcos' soldiers in Pantabangan on June 17, 1976. Both of them have since been honored at the Philippines' Bantayog ng mga Bayani as martyrs of the democratic resistance against authoritarianism.

==== Construction of Pantabangan dam ====
In May 1966, Congress passed the Upper Pampanga River Project Act (Republic Act No. 5499), authorizing construction of the Pantabangan Dam and its appurtenant structures. The groundbreaking ceremony led by President Ferdinand Marcos took place on June 11, 1971, and the project was finally completed in August 1974.

The construction of the dam had great economic and social impact on the lives of Pantabangeños. About 8,100 hectares (20,000 acres) of productive farmland and the town center (East and West Poblacion) along with seven outlying barangays (Villarica, Liberty, Cadaclan, San Juan, Napon-Napon, Marikit and Conversion) were submerged under the new lake. Residents were relocated to higher ground overlooking the vast reservoir, which became the new Pantabangan town center. Before the expansion of the dam through the Casecnan Project in the 1990s, the belfry of the 18th-century church resurfaced from the dam's summer low water level. During a drought in 1983, some areas of the old town emerged.

The Pantabangan Dam is claimed to be the second largest dam in Asia, and supplies the irrigation requirements for about 77,000 hectares (190,000 acres) of agricultural lands in Central Luzon. Its power station generates 112 megawatts of hydroelectric power.

=== Contemporary history ===
In February 1996, President Fidel V. Ramos led the groundbreaking ceremony of the Casecnan Transbasin Project, a 27 kilometres (17 mi) tunnel from the Casecnan River in Nueva Vizcaya to a terminal point at the Pantabangan Reservoir and was commissioned on December 11, 2001. The project aims to augment the capacity of the dam to irrigate an additional 50,000 hectares (120,000 acres) of agricultural land and generate an additional 140 megawatts of hydroelectric power for the Luzon grid.

The present Pantabangan town has 14 barangays and a total land area of about 41,735 hectares. The succeeding years since its relocation saw its progress from a fifth-class municipality in 1975, then to a fourth-class, then to a Municipality in 2006 and finally, in July 2008, pursuant to Section 2 of the Department of Finance Order No. 23-08, Pantabangan was reclassified as First-Class Municipality. It is notably the only town in the Philippines with three hydroelectric plants inside its territory.

== Geography ==
Located in the northern part of Nueva Ecija, Pantabangan is located at the foot of Mt. Mabilog below Mt. Dalimanok which are found between Sierra Madre and Caraballo Mountain ranges. It is home to the Pantabangan–Carranglan Watershed Forest Reserve. It is also the site of the Pantabangan Dam and Lake.

Pantabangan is 51 kilometres (32 mi) from Cabanatuan, 65 kilometres (40 mi) from Palayan, 167 kilometres (104 mi) from Manila, and 139 kilometres (86 mi) from Bayombong.

=== Barangays ===
Pantabangan is politically subdivided into 14 barangays, as shown below. Each barangay consists of puroks and some have sitios.

- Cadaclan
- Cambitala
- Conversion
- Ganduz
- Liberty
- Malbang
- Marikit
- Napon-Napon
- Poblacion East
- Poblacion West
- Sampaloc
- San Juan
- Villarica
- Fatima

=== Climate ===
Climate data for Pantabangan, Nueva Ecija
Month	Jan	Feb	Mar	Apr	May	Jun	Jul	Aug	Sep	Oct	Nov	Dec	Year
Mean daily maximum °C (°F)	28 (82)	29 (84)	30 (86)	32 (90)	31 (88)	30 (86)	29 (84)	28 (82)	28 (82)	28 (82)	29 (84)	28 (82)	29 (84)
Mean daily minimum °C (°F)	18 (64)	18 (64)	19 (66)	20 (68)	22 (72)	22 (72)	22 (72)	22 (72)	22 (72)	22 (72)	20 (68)	18 (64)	20 (69)
Average precipitation mm (inches)	4 (0.2)	6 (0.2)	7 (0.3)	12 (0.5)	61 (2.4)	89 (3.5)	96 (3.8)	99 (3.9)	81 (3.2)	88 (3.5)	37 (1.5)	13 (0.5)	593 (23.5)
Average rainy days	2.5	3.0	4.1	6.3	15.8	19.4	22.5	21.6	20.1	17.5	9.6	4.0	146.4
Source: Meteoblue

== Demographics ==
Population census of Pantabangan

Year	Pop.	±% p.a.
1903	1,151	—
1918	2,245	+4.55%
1939	5,655	+4.50%
1948	5,132	−1.07%
1960	8,169	+3.95%
1970	12,998	+4.75%
1975	18,074	+6.84%
1980	13,916	−5.09%

Year	Pop.	±% p.a.
1990	18,341	+2.80%
1995	22,183	+3.63%
2000	23,868	+1.58%
2007	25,520	+0.93%
2010	27,353	+2.56%
2015	29,925	+1.73%
2020	31,763	+1.26%
2024	32,694	+0.70%

Source: Philippine Statistics Authority

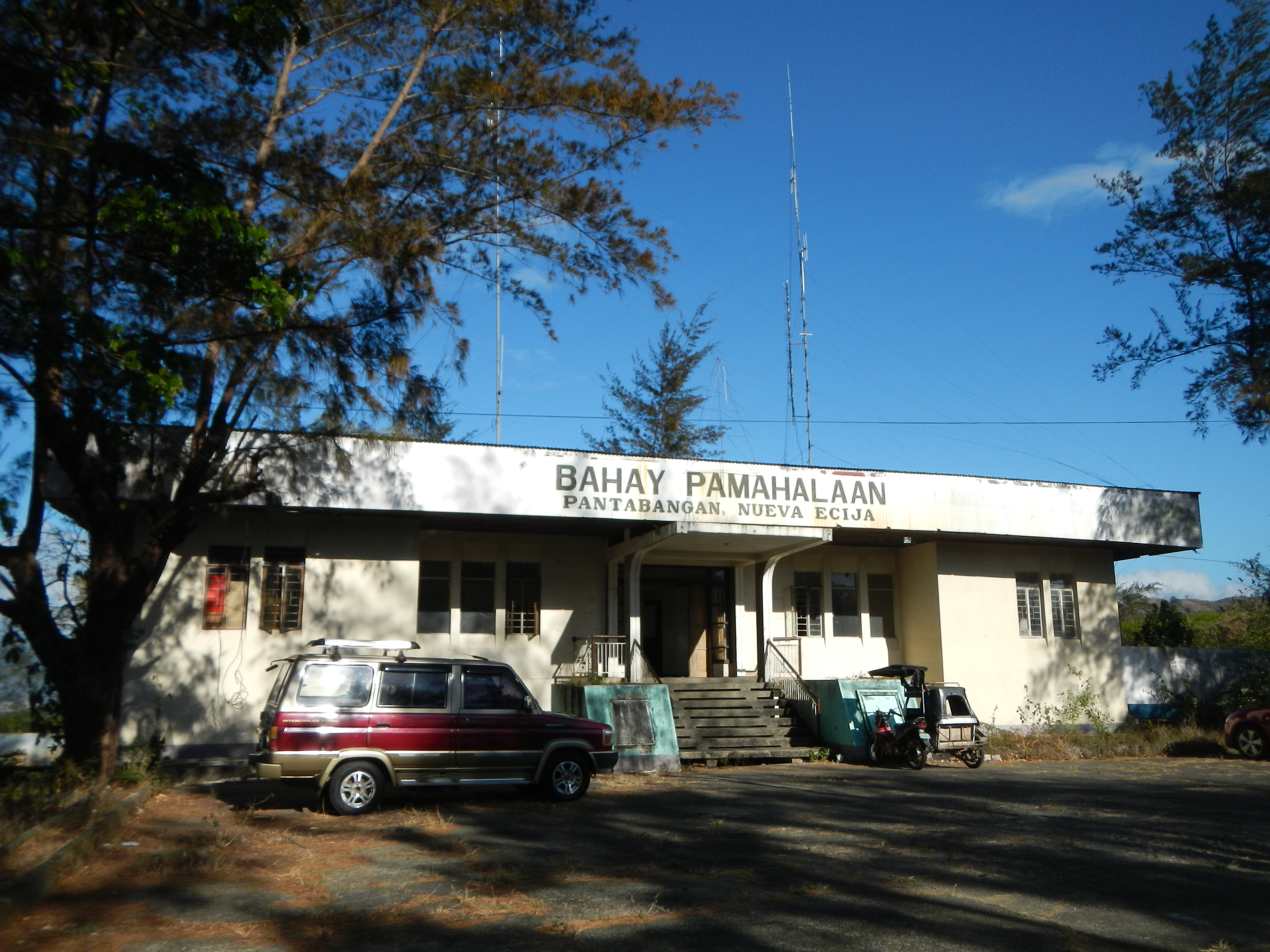
Pantabangan Town Hall

=== Languages ===
Tagalog is predominantly spoken in Pantabangan, followed by Ilocano. The people of Pantabangan ("Pantabangenian") are also known for their very distinct strong Pantabangan accent and expressions like "Adyu" and "ari".

== Economy ==
Poverty incidence of Pantabangan (%)

Source: Philippine Statistics Authority

== Arts and culture ==
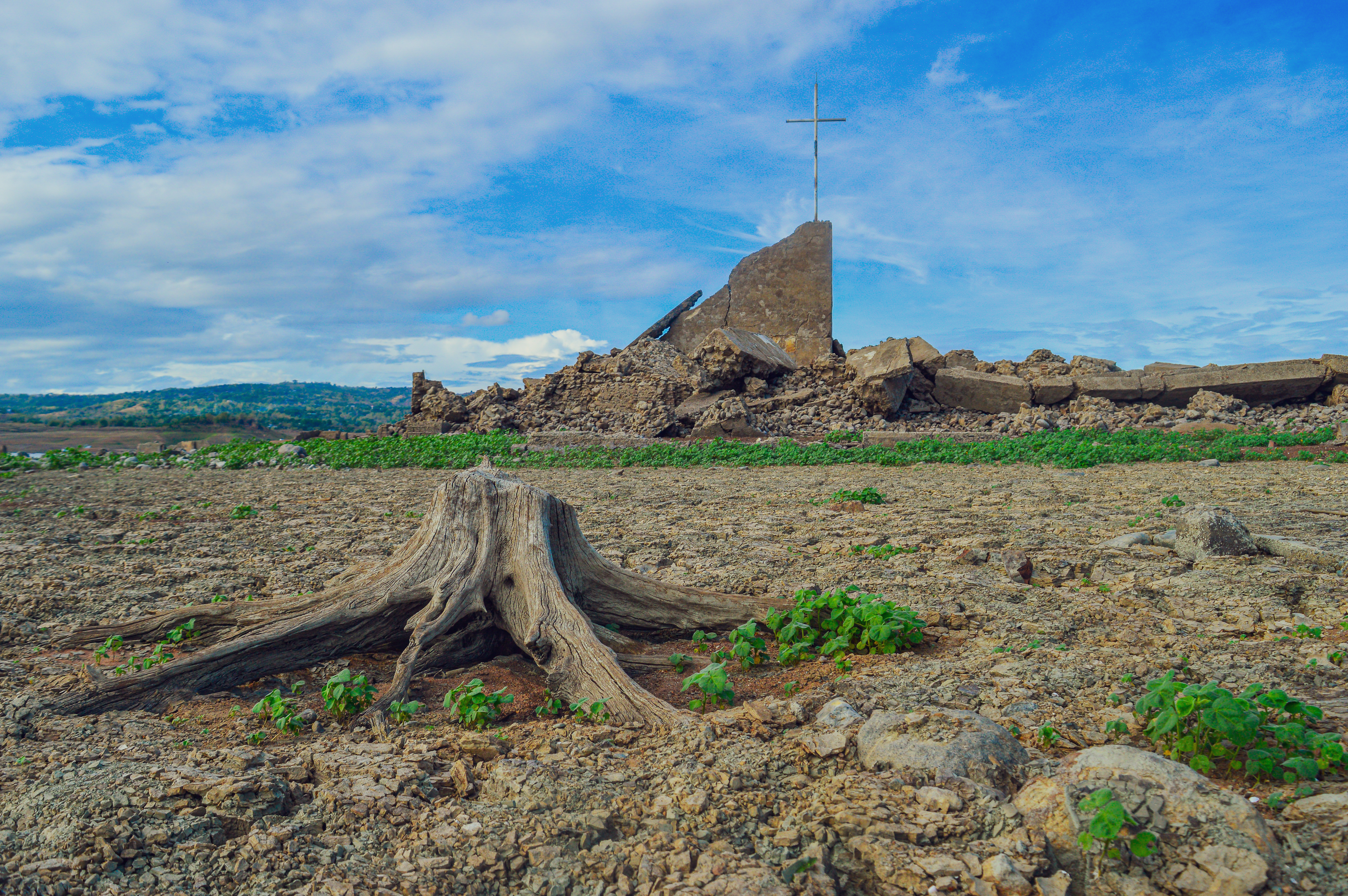
The old town centre of Pantabangan, resurfacing in May 2024. In the background is the cross of Saint Andrew’s Church.

The Pandawan Festival began in April 2008, showcasing many local talents as well as other entertainments including indigenous art activities like art workshops and rural development art awareness programs. It also hosts cooking contests, dance competitions, street dancing, and a parade.

Since the completion of the dam, the site of the old town has become visible during times of extremely low water levels in the reservoir coinciding with the El Niño phenomenon, with recorded instances occurring in 1983, 2014, 2020, 2024 and 2026. These rare occasions sparking an influx of townsfolk and tourists to the site, particularly to the ruins of Saint Andrew’s Church which date to 1825. A tall, more modern, metal cross painted white was added atop the ruins of a high wall as it is the first to emerge during dry periods. When the town resurfaces, townsfolk often hold Mass at the site of the former church. The ruins, which include the old public cemetery with its headstones, foundations of the old municipal hall with its historical town marker, the former town plaza and old tree trunks, have been designated as a cultural heritage zone by the municipal government.

== Transportation ==
Much of Pantabangan's population rely on public transportation such as tricycles and jeeps to get around the town.

== Education ==
The Pantabangan Schools District Office governs all educational institutions within the municipality. It oversees the management and operations of all private and public, from primary to secondary schools.

=== Primary and elementary schools ===
- Cambitala Elementary School
- Conversion Elementary School
- Cadaclan Elementary School
- Ganduz Elementary School
- Kalayaan Elementary School
- Liberty Elementary School
- Masiway Elementary School
- Napon-Napon Elementary School
- Pamalyan Cultural Minority PS
- Pantabangan East Central School
- Pantabangan West Central School
- Salvacion Elementary School
- Sampaloc Elementary School
- San Juan Elementary School
- St. Andrew's School
- Tanawan Central School
- Villanueve Elementary School

=== Secondary schools ===
- Cambitala National High School
- Conversion Integrated School
- Ganduz National High School
- Marikit Integrated School
- Pantabangan National High School
- Pantabangan National High School - Annex (Cadaclan Integrated School)

== Gallery ==
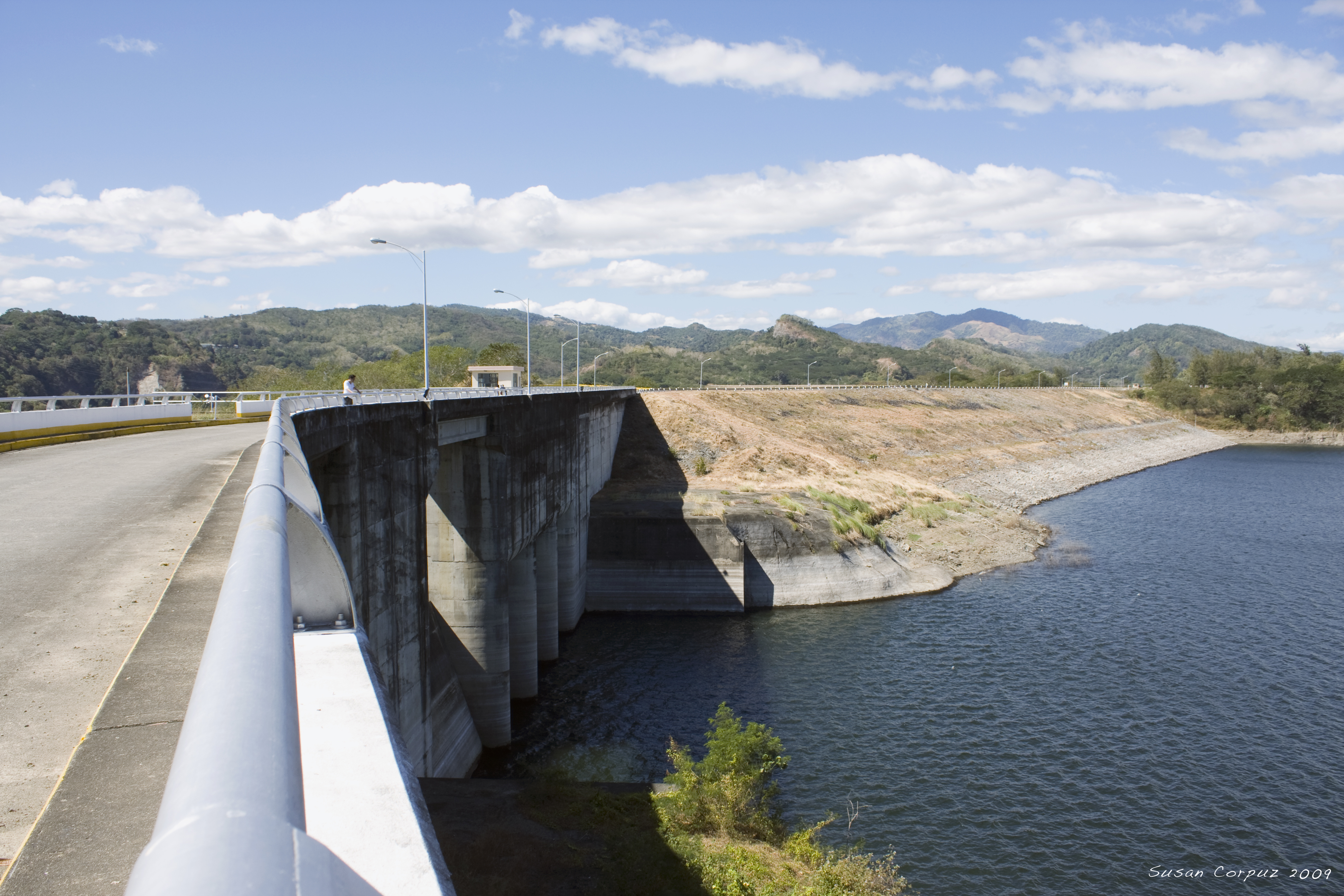
Pantabangan Dam

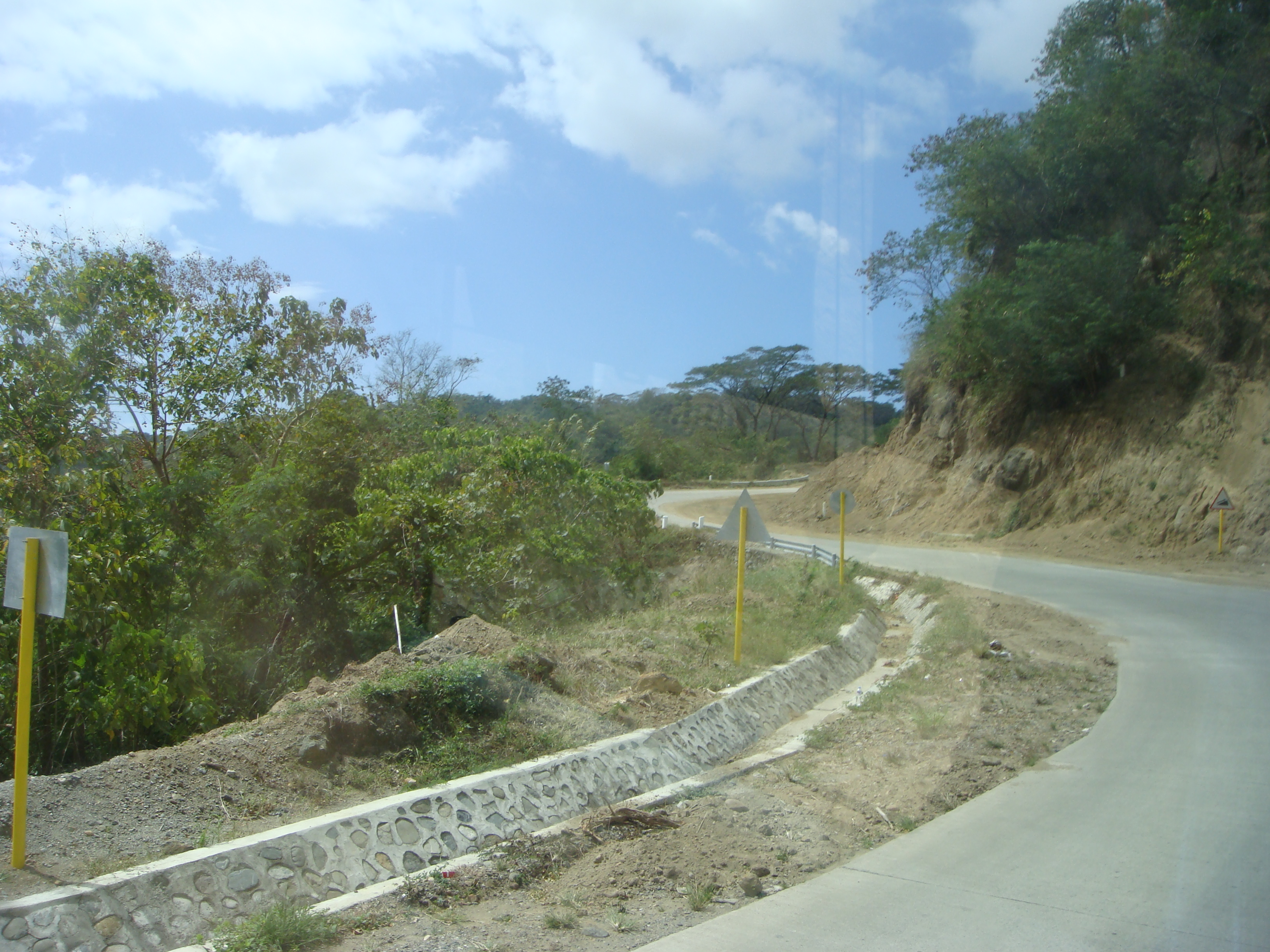
Forests and mountains (Cadaclan)

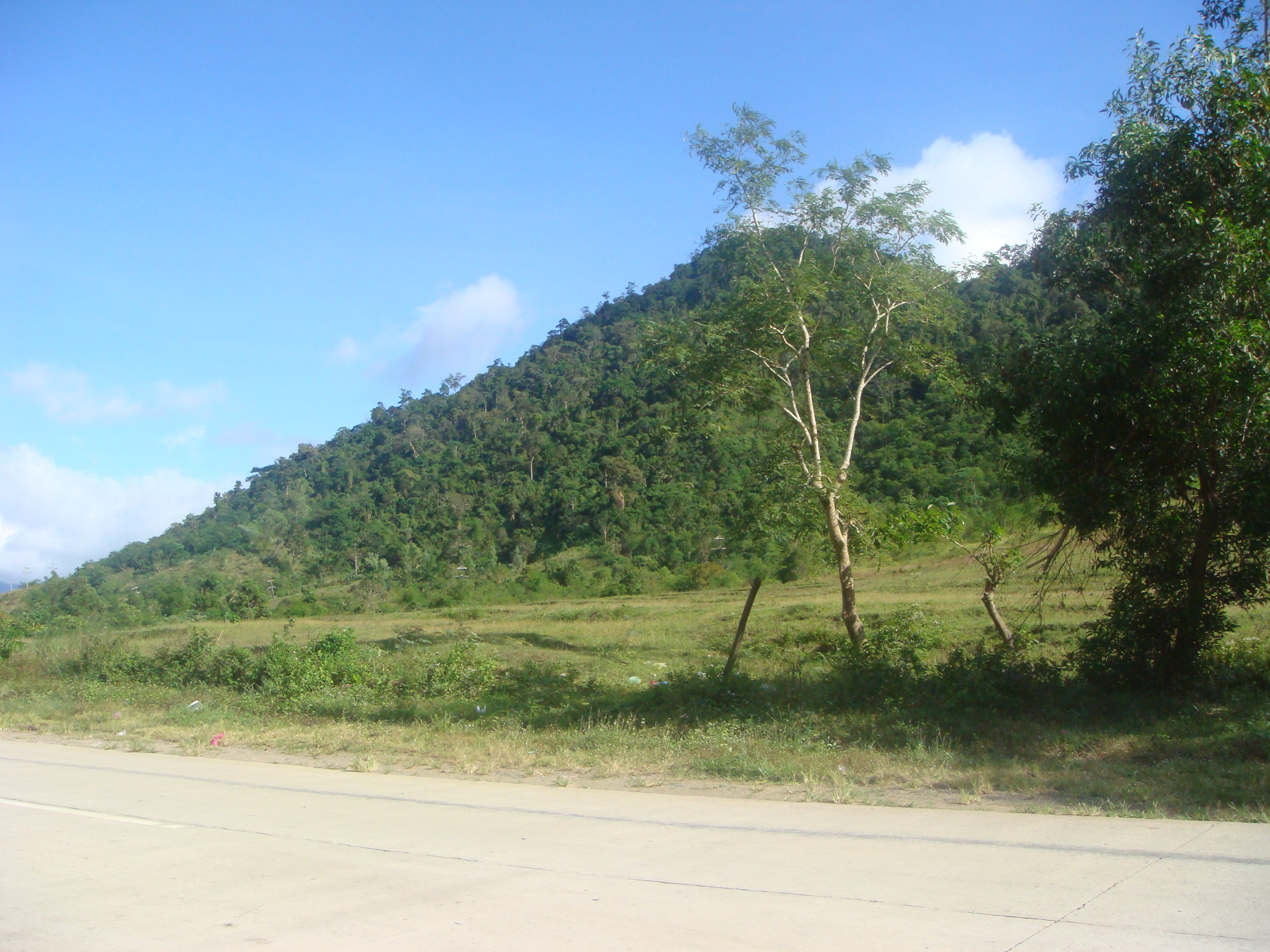
Hills and forests (Marikit)

== Notable personalities ==
- Jason Abalos, a Filipino actor.
