= Rizal, Nueva Ecija =

Municipality in Nueva Ecija, Philippines

Rizal
- Municipality
- Municipality of Rizal
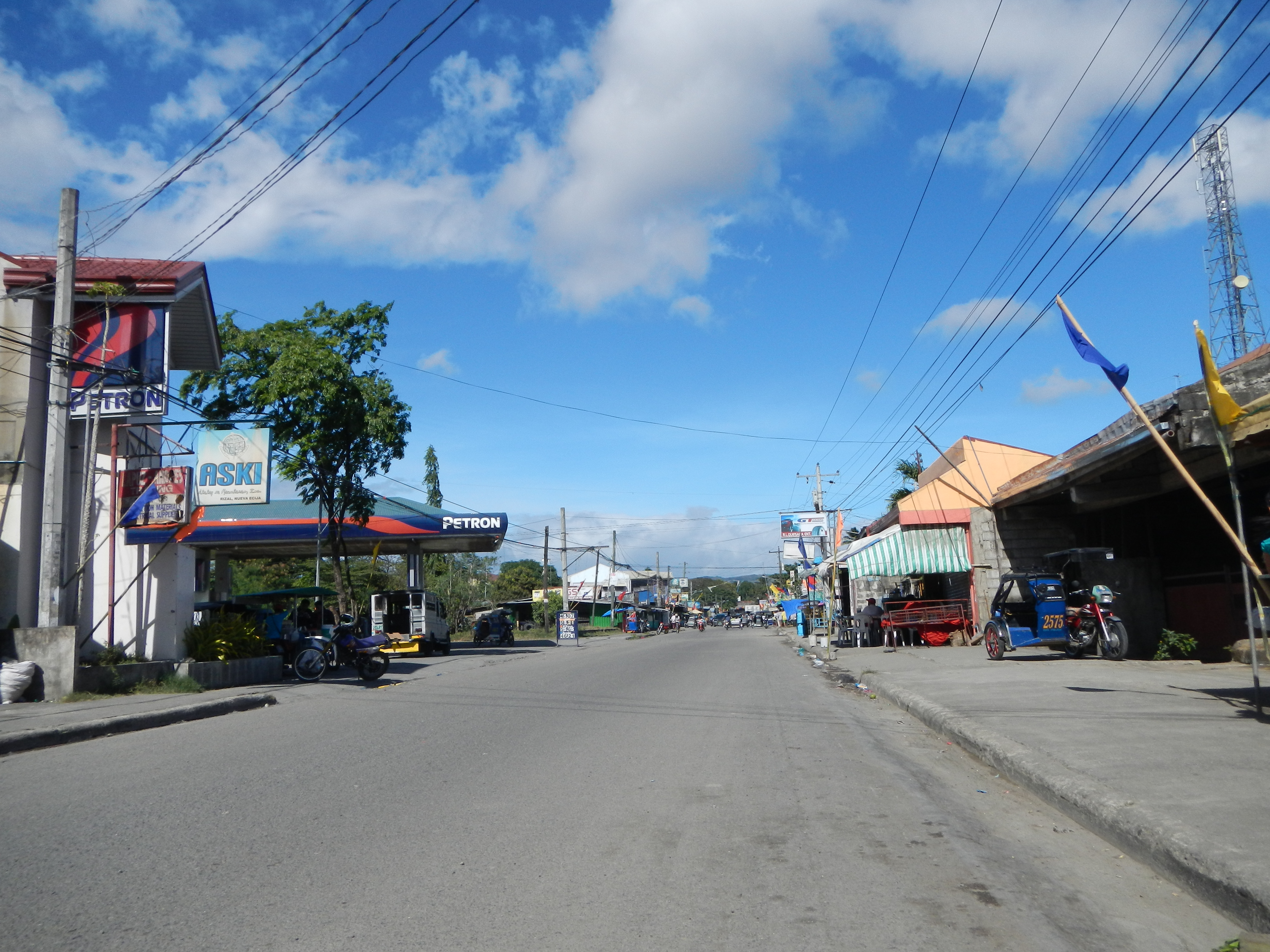
- Downtown

- Seal

- Map of Nueva Ecija with Rizal highlighted
- Interactive map of Rizal
- Location within the Philippines
- Coordinates: 15°42′36″N 121°06′17″E
- Country: Philippines
- Region: Central Luzon
- Province: Nueva Ecija
- District: 2nd district
- Founded: January 1, 1913
- Named for: Dr. Jose Rizal
- Barangays: 26 (see Barangays)

Government
  - Type: Sangguniang Bayan
  - Mayor: John Mateo A. Saure
  - Vice Mayor: Sean Sedrick B. Bao
  - Representative: Mario O. Salvador
  - Municipal Council: Members: Dennis R. Soliven; Cindy F. Abesamis; Eric Jason D. Sulfelix; Mark Jay R. Miranda; Rosalinda M. De Guzman; Sherwin B. Inocente; Louie G. Acosta; Christian V. Mangapis
  - Electorate: 37,002 voters (2025)

Area
  - Total: 120.55 km^{2} (46.54 sq mi)
- Elevation: 103 m (338 ft)
- Highest elevation: 327 m (1,073 ft)
- Lowest elevation: 71 m (233 ft)

Population (2024 census)
  - Total: 71,749
  - Density: 595.18/km^{2} (1,541.5/sq mi)
  - Households: 17,402

Economy
  - Income class: 1st municipal income class
  - Poverty incidence: 10.34% (2023)
  - Revenue: ₱ 282.4 million (2024)
  - Assets: ₱ 1,208 million (2024)
  - Expenditure: ₱ 313.5 million (2024)
  - Liabilities: ₱ 664.3 million (2024)

Service provider
  - Electricity: Nueva Ecija 2 Area 2 Electric Cooperative (NEECO 2 A2)
- Time zone: UTC+8 (PST)
- ZIP code: 3127
- PSGC: 0304923000
- IDD : area code: +63 (0)44
- Native languages: Ilocano; Tagalog

Rizal, officially the Municipality of Rizal (Ilocano: Ili ti Rizal; Tagalog: Bayan ng Rizal) is a municipality in the province of Nueva Ecija, Philippines. According to the 2024 census, it has a population of 71,749 people.

== History ==
Historically, two groups were known to have settled in the area. The main group consisted entirely of the pioneer-settlers who were Ilocanos, while others, who arrived later, were of different tribes with different dialects. They merged and formed a new neighborhood, originally called Bunobon after the bunobon seedlings that thrived in the soil. It became a sitio of Cabucbucan under the jurisdiction of Bongabon municipality.

In 1904, sitio Bunobon became a barrio called Nazareth. Because of the steady arrival of new settlers, a council of elders was formed. Selected as head was Apo Juliano Paraiso, one of the eldest within the group, who took the lead in requesting that government convert Nazareth into an independent town. Through the help of Governor Manuel Tinio and Assemblyman Isauro Gabaldon, the request of the elders was approved in 1908.

On December 26, 1912, Vice Governor Newton W. Gilbert signed the act and simultaneously issued a proclamation creating the town of Rizal, after Dr. José Rizal. On January 1, 1913, Don Julian Paraiso was inaugurated as the first alcalde of the Municipality. In 1917 and 1918, the Bureau of Land surveyed the municipality for homestead and residential lots. In 1930, Barangay Paco Roman became a barrio, separating it from Barangay Estrella. In 1954, Villa Paraiso was created as a barrio out of barangay Canaan and was named in honor of late Mayor Gaudencio V. Paraiso. In 1959, General Luna officially became a barrio out of barangay Canaan.

In 1954, Rizal lost some of its territory when the barrios of San Felipe and San Alfonso were separated to form the town of Llanera along with some territory from Talavera and San Jose.

In 1963, Villa Pascua was renamed Barangay Pag-asa which is a part of Barangay Agbanawag. In January 1968, Barangay Casilagan became a barrio through Resolution Number 2 of the Provincial Board on January 3, 1968, which was formerly a sitio of Canaan, which was bisected by the Bulalakay Creek, and it was divided into two barrios known as Canaan Este and Canaan Weste. On July 20, 1970, Sanggunian Panlalawigan passed Resolution No. 220 approving the creation of Barangay Maligaya in accordance with Republic Act No. 3590, the area to be taken from the Barangay Bicos and on July 12, 1971, then the Provincial Board Resolution No. 231, Villa Labrador became a Barrio separating it to Villa Paraiso.

Rizal was close to the epicenter of the 1990 Luzon earthquake on July 16.

== Geography ==
The municipality of Rizal is 49 kilometers (30 mi) from the provincial capital city of Palayan, and 151 kilometers (94 mi) from the country's capital Manila.

=== Barangays ===
Rizal is politically subdivided into 26 barangays. Each barangay consists of puroks and some have sitios.

- Agbannawag
- Aglipay
- Bicos
- Cabucbucan
- Calaocan District
- Canaan East
- Canaan West
- Casilagan
- Del Pilar
- Estrella
- General Luna
- Macapsing
- Maligaya
- Paco Roman
- Pag-asa
- Poblacion Central
- Poblacion East
- Poblacion Norte
- Poblacion Sur
- Poblacion West
- Portal
- San Esteban
- San Gregorio
- Santa Monica
- Villa Labrador
- Villa Paraiso

=== Climate ===
Climate data for Rizal, Nueva Ecija
Month	Jan	Feb	Mar	Apr	May	Jun	Jul	Aug	Sep	Oct	Nov	Dec	Year
Mean daily maximum °C (°F)	29 (84)	30 (86)	31 (88)	33 (91)	33 (91)	31 (88)	30 (86)	29 (84)	29 (84)	30 (86)	30 (86)	29 (84)	30 (87)
Mean daily minimum °C (°F)	19 (66)	19 (66)	20 (68)	22 (72)	23 (73)	24 (75)	24 (75)	24 (75)	23 (73)	22 (72)	21 (70)	20 (68)	22 (71)
Average precipitation mm (inches)	4 (0.2)	6 (0.2)	7 (0.3)	12 (0.5)	61 (2.4)	89 (3.5)	96 (3.8)	99 (3.9)	81 (3.2)	88 (3.5)	37 (1.5)	13 (0.5)	593 (23.5)
Average rainy days	2.5	3.0	4.1	6.3	15.8	19.4	22.5	21.6	20.1	17.5	9.6	4.0	146.4
Source: Meteoblue

== Demographics ==
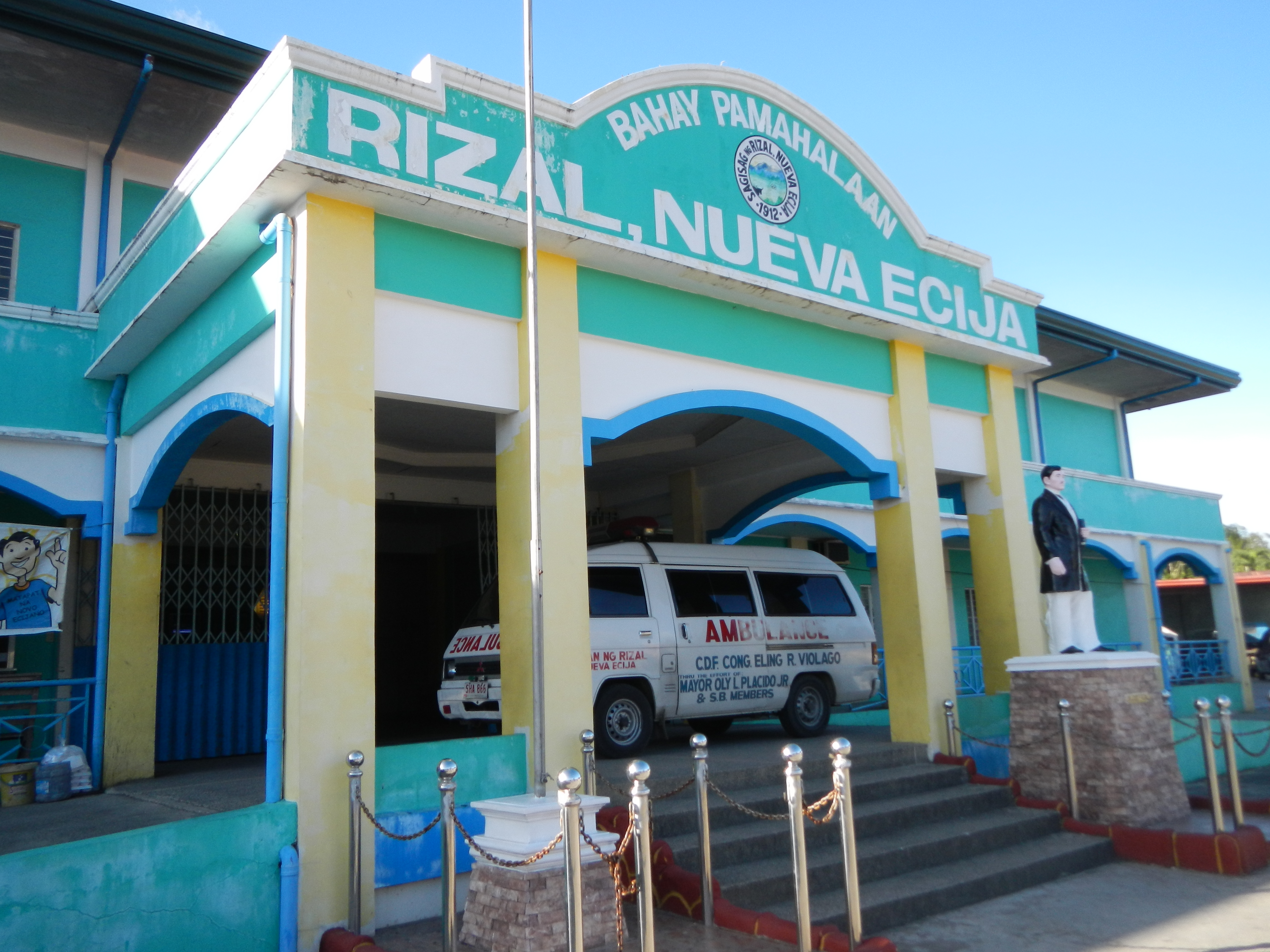
Municipal hall

Population census of Rizal

Year	Pop.	±% p.a.
1918	6,687	—
1939	15,936	+4.22%
1948	16,754	+0.56%
1960	19,447	+1.25%
1970	25,919	+2.91%
1975	28,517	+1.93%
1980	31,407	+1.95%
1990	38,970	+2.18%

Year	Pop.	±% p.a.
1995	45,834	+3.09%
2000	48,166	+1.07%
2007	52,465	+1.19%
2010	57,145	+3.16%
2015	64,087	+2.21%
2020	70,196	+1.93%
2024	71,749	+0.53%

Source: Philippine Statistics Authority

== Economy ==
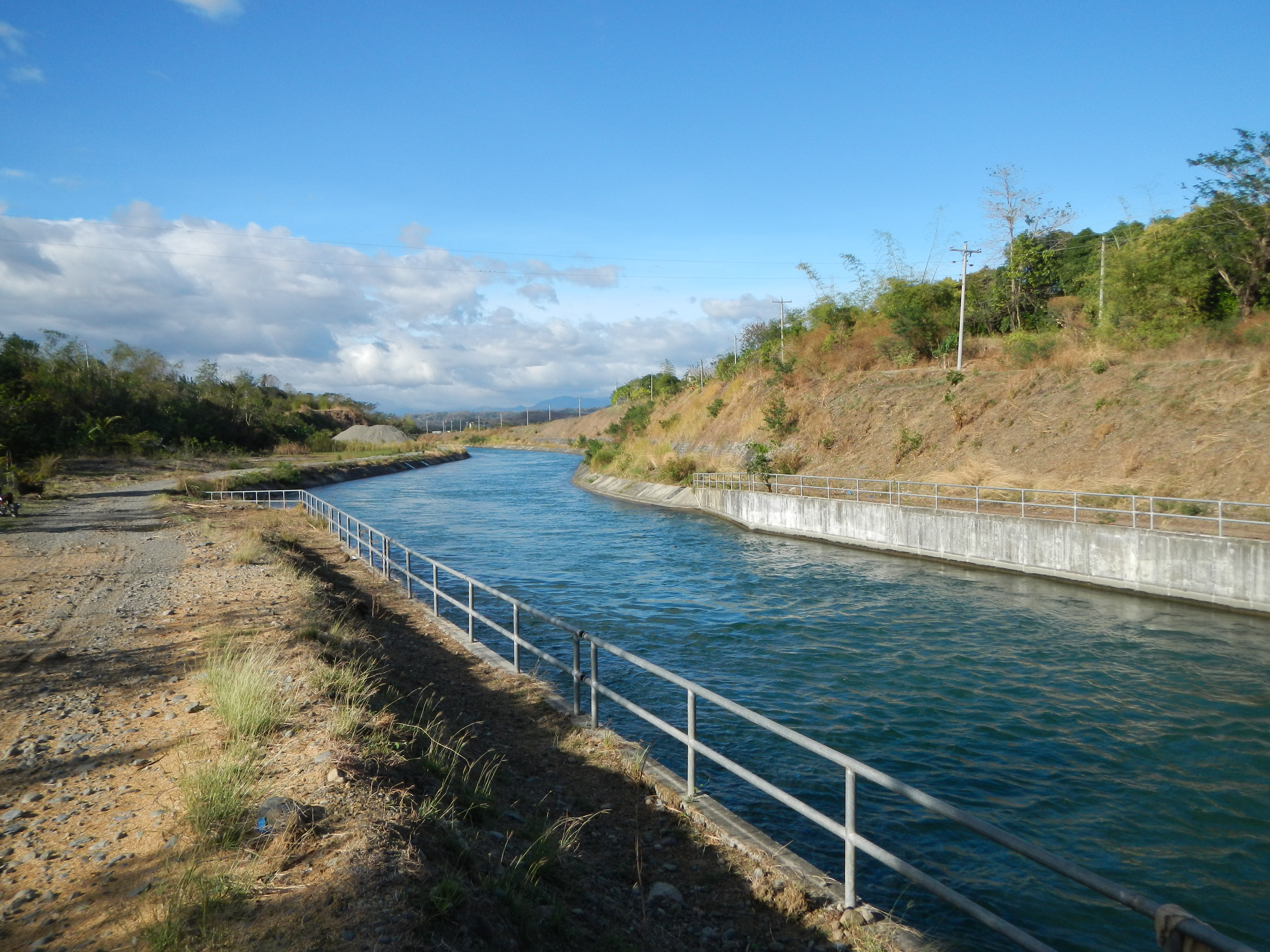
Casecnan Dam (The Casecnan Irrigation and Power Generation Project)

Poverty incidence of Rizal (%)

Source: Philippine Statistics Authority

== Education ==
The Rizal Schools District Office governs all educational institutions within the municipality. It oversees the management and operations of all private and public, from primary to secondary schools.

=== Primary and elementary schools ===
- Agbannawag Elementary School
- Aglipay Elementary School
- Ballesteros Elementary School
- Bicos Elementary School
- Blessed Hope Bible Baptist Academy
- Cabucbucan Elementary School
- Canaan East Elementary School
- Canaan West Elementary School
- Casilagan Elementary School
- Del Pilar Elementary School
- Don Lorenzo E. Aleta Elementary School
- Essential Leadership for Children Learning Center
- Estrella Elementary School
- Gen. Luna Elementary School
- Good Shepherd's Educational Center Inc.
- Granary Co-Educational Institution
- Hildegard Integrated Learning School
- Jesus is Lord Christian School
- Kaunlaran Elementary School
- Learning Centre by the Hillside
- Macapsing Elementary School
- Maligaya Elementary School
- Paco Roman Elementary School
- Pag-Asa Elementary School
- Portal Elementary School
- Rizal Central School
- Rizal West Elementary School
- San Esteban Elementary School
- San Gregorio Elementary School
- Sta. Monica Elementary School
- UCCP Rizal Shalom Learning Center
- UCCP Shalon Christian School
- Villa Labrador Elementary School
- Villa Paraiso Elementary School

=== Secondary schools ===
- Agbannawag National High School
- Bicos National High School
- Cabucbucan National High School
- Canaan East National High School
- Rizal National High School
