= Nueva Ecija's 2nd congressional district =

Legislative district of the Philippines

- Constituency for the House of Representatives of the Philippines
- Boundary of the 2nd congressional district in Nueva Ecija

- Location of Nueva Ecija within the Philippines
- Province: Nueva Ecija
- Region: Central Luzon
- Population: 463,670 (2015)
- Electorate: 277,920 (2016)
- Major settlements: 8 LGUs: Cities; Muñoz; San Jose; Municipalities; Carranglan; Llanera; Lupao; Pantabangan; Rizal; Talugtug
- Area: 1,897.18 km^{2} (732.51 sq mi)

Current constituency
- Created: 1926
- Representative: Kokoy Salvador
- Political party: PFP; Unang Sigaw
- Congressional bloc: Majority

Nueva Ecija's 2nd congressional district is one of the four congressional districts of the Philippines in the province of Nueva Ecija. It has been represented in the House of Representatives of the Philippines since 1928. The district consists of the northern cities of Muñoz and San Jose, as well as the municipalities of Carranglan, Llanera, Lupao, Pantabangan, Rizal, and Talugtug, which border Nueva Vizcaya and Pangasinan. It is currently represented in the 20th Congress by Kokoy Salvador of the Partido Federal ng Pilipinas and Unang Sigaw.

== Representation history ==
| # | Image | Member | Term of office | | Legislature | Party | Electoral history | Constituent LGUs |
| # | Image | Member | Start | End | Legislature | Party | Electoral history | Constituent LGUs |
|---|---|---|---|---|---|---|---|---|
=== Nueva Ecija's 2nd district for the House of Representatives of the Philippine Islands ===
District created December 7, 1926 from Nueva Ecija's at-large district.
| 1 | | Aurelio Cecilio | June 5, 1928 | June 2, 1931 | 8th | Demócrata | Elected in 1928. | 1928–1935; Bongabon, Cabanatuan, Cabiao, Carranglan, Gapan, Laur, Pantabangan, Peñaranda, Rizal, San Isidro, San Jose, San Leonardo, Santa Rosa |
| 2 | | Felipe Buencamino Jr. | June 2, 1931 | June 5, 1934 | 9th | Nacionalista; Consolidado | Elected in 1931. | 1928–1935; Bongabon, Cabanatuan, Cabiao, Carranglan, Gapan, Laur, Pantabangan, Peñaranda, Rizal, San Isidro, San Jose, San Leonardo, Santa Rosa |
| 3 | | Isauro Gabaldón | June 5, 1934 | September 16, 1935 | 10th | Nacionalista; Democrático | Elected in 1934. | 1928–1935; Bongabon, Cabanatuan, Cabiao, Carranglan, Gapan, Laur, Pantabangan, Peñaranda, Rizal, San Isidro, San Jose, San Leonardo, Santa Rosa |
| # | Image | Member | Term of office | | National Assembly | Party | Electoral history | Constituent LGUs |
| # | Image | Member | Start | End | National Assembly | Party | Electoral history | Constituent LGUs |
=== Nueva Ecija's 2nd district for the National Assembly (Commonwealth of the Philippines) ===
| (2) | | Felipe Buencamino Jr. | September 16, 1935 | March 27, 1940 | 1st | Nacionalista; Democrático | Elected in 1935. | 1935–1941; Bongabon, Cabanatuan, Cabiao, Carranglan, Gapan, Laur, Pantabangan, Peñaranda, Rizal, San Isidro, San Jose, San Leonardo, Santa Rosa |
| (2) | | Felipe Buencamino Jr. | September 16, 1935 | March 27, 1940 | 2nd | Nacionalista | Re-elected in 1938. Resigned. | 1935–1941; Bongabon, Cabanatuan, Cabiao, Carranglan, Gapan, Laur, Pantabangan, Peñaranda, Rizal, San Isidro, San Jose, San Leonardo, Santa Rosa |
| 4 | | Gabriel Belmonte | December 10, 1940 | December 30, 1941 | 2nd | Nacionalista | Elected in 1940 to finish Buencamino's term. | 1935–1941; Bongabon, Cabanatuan, Cabiao, Carranglan, Gapan, Laur, Pantabangan, Peñaranda, Rizal, San Isidro, San Jose, San Leonardo, Santa Rosa |
District dissolved into the two-seat Nueva Ecija's at-large district for the National Assembly (Second Philippine Republic).
| # | Image | Member | Term of office | | Common wealth Congress | Party | Electoral history | Constituent LGUs |
| # | Image | Member | Start | End | Common wealth Congress | Party | Electoral history | Constituent LGUs |
=== Nueva Ecija's 2nd district for the House of Representatives of the Commonwealth of the Philippines ===
District re-created May 24, 1945.
| (4) | | Gabriel Belmonte | June 11, 1945 | May 25, 1946 | 1st | Nacionalista | Re-elected in 1941. | 1945–1946; Bongabon, Cabanatuan, Cabiao, Carranglan, Gapan, Laur, Pantabangan, Peñaranda, Rizal, San Isidro, San Jose, San Leonardo, Santa Rosa |
| # | Image | Member | Term of office | | Congress | Party | Electoral history | Constituent LGUs |
| # | Image | Member | Start | End | Congress | Party | Electoral history | Constituent LGUs |
=== Nueva Ecija's 2nd district for the House of Representatives of the Philippines ===
| 5 | | Constancio I. Padilla | May 3, 1948 | December 30, 1949 | 1st | Democratic Alliance | Elected in 1946. Oath of office deferred due to electoral protests against Democratic Alliance candidates. | 1946–1953; Bongabon, Cabanatuan, Cabiao, Carranglan, Gapan, Laur, Pantabangan, Peñaranda, Rizal, San Isidro, San Jose, San Leonardo, Santa Rosa |
| 6 | | Jesús Ilagan | December 30, 1949 | December 30, 1953 | 2nd | Liberal | Elected in 1949. | 1946–1953; Bongabon, Cabanatuan, Cabiao, Carranglan, Gapan, Laur, Pantabangan, Peñaranda, Rizal, San Isidro, San Jose, San Leonardo, Santa Rosa |
| 7 | | Celestino C. Juan | December 30, 1953 | December 30, 1957 | 3rd | Nacionalista | Elected in 1953. | 1953–1957; Bongabon, Cabanatuan, Cabiao, Carranglan, Gapan, Laur, Pantabangan, Peñaranda, Rizal, Sabani, San Isidro, San Jose, San Leonardo, Santa Rosa |
| 8 | | Felicísimo Ocampo | December 30, 1957 | December 30, 1965 | 4th | Liberal | Elected in 1957. | 1957–1965; Bongabon, Cabanatuan, Cabiao, Carranglan, Gabaldon, Gapan, General Mamerto Natividad, Laur, Llanera, Pantabangan, Peñaranda, Rizal, San Isidro, San Jose, San Leonardo, Santa Rosa |
| 8 | | Felicísimo Ocampo | December 30, 1957 | December 30, 1965 | 5th | Liberal | Re-elected in 1961. | 1957–1965; Bongabon, Cabanatuan, Cabiao, Carranglan, Gabaldon, Gapan, General Mamerto Natividad, Laur, Llanera, Pantabangan, Peñaranda, Rizal, San Isidro, San Jose, San Leonardo, Santa Rosa |
| 9 | | Ángel D. Concepción | December 30, 1965 | September 23, 1972 | 6th | Nacionalista | Elected in 1965. | 1965–1972; Bongabon, Cabanatuan, Cabiao, Carranglan, Gabaldon, Gapan, General Mamerto Natividad, Laur, Llanera, Palayan, Pantabangan, Peñaranda, Rizal, San Isidro, San Jose, San Leonardo, Santa Rosa |
| 9 | | Ángel D. Concepción | December 30, 1965 | September 23, 1972 | 7th | Nacionalista | Re-elected in 1969. Removed from office after imposition of martial law. | 1965–1972; Bongabon, Cabanatuan, Cabiao, Carranglan, Gabaldon, Gapan, General Mamerto Natividad, Laur, Llanera, Palayan, Pantabangan, Peñaranda, Rizal, San Isidro, San Jose, San Leonardo, Santa Rosa |
District dissolved into the sixteen-seat Region III's at-large district for the Interim Batasang Pambansa, followed by the four-seat Nueva Ecija's at-large district for the Regular Batasang Pambansa.
District re-created February 2, 1987.
| 10 | | Simeon E. Garcia Jr. | June 30, 1987 | June 30, 1992 | 8th | LnB | Elected in 1987. | 1987–present Carranglan, Llanera, Lupao, Muñoz, Pantabangan, Rizal, San Jose, Talugtug |
| 10 | | Simeon E. Garcia Jr. | June 30, 1987 | June 30, 1992 | 8th | PDP–Laban | Elected in 1987. | 1987–present Carranglan, Llanera, Lupao, Muñoz, Pantabangan, Rizal, San Jose, Talugtug |
| 10 | | Simeon E. Garcia Jr. | June 30, 1987 | June 30, 1992 | 8th | BALANE | Elected in 1987. | 1987–present Carranglan, Llanera, Lupao, Muñoz, Pantabangan, Rizal, San Jose, Talugtug |
| 11 | | Eleuterio R. Violago | June 30, 1992 | June 30, 1998 | 9th | NPC (BALANE) | Elected in 1992. | 1987–present Carranglan, Llanera, Lupao, Muñoz, Pantabangan, Rizal, San Jose, Talugtug |
| 11 | | Eleuterio R. Violago | June 30, 1992 | June 30, 1998 | 10th | Lakas | Re-elected in 1995. | 1987–present Carranglan, Llanera, Lupao, Muñoz, Pantabangan, Rizal, San Jose, Talugtug |
| (10) | | Simeon E. Garcia Jr. | June 30, 1998 | June 30, 2001 | 11th | LAMMP | Elected in 1998. | 1987–present Carranglan, Llanera, Lupao, Muñoz, Pantabangan, Rizal, San Jose, Talugtug |
| (11) | | Eleuterio R. Violago | June 30, 2001 | June 30, 2007 | 12th | Lakas | Elected in 2001. | 1987–present Carranglan, Llanera, Lupao, Muñoz, Pantabangan, Rizal, San Jose, Talugtug |
| (11) | | Eleuterio R. Violago | June 30, 2001 | June 30, 2007 | 13th | Lakas | Re-elected in 2004. | 1987–present Carranglan, Llanera, Lupao, Muñoz, Pantabangan, Rizal, San Jose, Talugtug |
| 12 | | Joseph Gilbert F. Violago | June 30, 2007 | June 30, 2016 | 14th | Lakas | Elected in 2007. | 1987–present Carranglan, Llanera, Lupao, Muñoz, Pantabangan, Rizal, San Jose, Talugtug |
| 12 | | Joseph Gilbert F. Violago | June 30, 2007 | June 30, 2016 | 15th | Liberal | Re-elected in 2010. | 1987–present Carranglan, Llanera, Lupao, Muñoz, Pantabangan, Rizal, San Jose, Talugtug |
| 12 | | Joseph Gilbert F. Violago | June 30, 2007 | June 30, 2016 | 16th | Liberal | Re-elected in 2013. | 1987–present Carranglan, Llanera, Lupao, Muñoz, Pantabangan, Rizal, San Jose, Talugtug |
| 13 | | Micaela S. Violago | June 30, 2016 | June 30, 2022 | 17th | NUP | Elected in 2016. | 1987–present Carranglan, Llanera, Lupao, Muñoz, Pantabangan, Rizal, San Jose, Talugtug |
| 13 | | Micaela S. Violago | June 30, 2016 | June 30, 2022 | 18th | NUP | Re-elected in 2019. | 1987–present Carranglan, Llanera, Lupao, Muñoz, Pantabangan, Rizal, San Jose, Talugtug |
| (12) | | Joseph Gilbert F. Violago | June 30, 2022 | June 30, 2025 | 19th | NUP | Elected in 2022. | 1987–present Carranglan, Llanera, Lupao, Muñoz, Pantabangan, Rizal, San Jose, Talugtug |
| 14 | | Mario O. Salvador | June 30, 2025 | Incumbent | 20th | PFP (Unang Sigaw) | Elected in 2025. | 1987–present Carranglan, Llanera, Lupao, Muñoz, Pantabangan, Rizal, San Jose, Talugtug |

== Election results ==
=== 2025 ===
| Candidate | Party | Votes | % |
|---|---|---|---|
| Kokoy Salvador | Partido Federal ng Pilipinas | 130,421 | 49.77 |
| Micaela Violago | Lakas–CMD | 129,657 | 49.48 |
| Danilo Malanda | Independent | 1,951 | 0.74 |
| Total | | 262,029 | 100.00 |
| Valid votes | | 262,029 | 94.74 |
| Invalid/blank votes | | 14,556 | 5.26 |
| Total votes | | 276,585 | 100.00 |
| Registered voters/turnout | | 329,147 | 84.03 |
| Partido Federal ng Pilipinas gain from National Unity Party | | | |
Source: Commission on Elections

=== 2022 ===
2022 Philippine House of Representatives elections
| Party | Candidate | Votes | % |
|---|---|---|---|
| NUP | Joseph Gilbert Violago | 116,099 | 47.79 |
| Independent | Joselito "Lito" Violago | 65,797 | 27.08 |
| Aksyon | Simeon Garcia Jr. | 59,607 | 24.54 |
| Independent | Danilo Malanda | 1,436 | 0.59 |
| Total votes | | 242,939 | 100.00 |
| NUP hold | | | |

=== 2019 ===
2019 Philippine House of Representatives elections
| Party | Candidate | Votes | % |
|---|---|---|---|
| NUP | Mikki Violago (incumbent) | 140,915 | 73.88 |
| Independent | Joselito "Lito" Violago | 49,795 | 26.11 |
| Total votes | | 190,720 | 100.00 |
| NUP hold | | | |

=== 2016 ===
2016 Philippine House of Representatives elections
| Party | Candidate | Votes | % |
|---|---|---|---|
| Liberal | Mikki Violago | 122,470 | |
| Nacionalista | Lito Violago | 86,674 | |
| Invalid or blank votes | | 14,394 | |
| Total votes | | 223,538 | |
| Liberal hold | | | |

=== 2013 ===
2013 Philippine House of Representatives elections
| Party | Candidate | Votes | % |
|---|---|---|---|
| Liberal | Joseph Gilbert Violago | 133,155 | 77.72 |
| Invalid or blank votes | | 38,175 | 22.28 |
| Total votes | | 171,330 | 100.00 |
| Liberal hold | | | |

=== 2010 ===
2010 Philippine House of Representatives elections
| Party | Candidate | Votes | % |
|---|---|---|---|
| Lakas–Kampi | Joseph Gilbert Violago | 144,507 | 77.94 |
| NPC | Leopoldo Tomas | 39,238 | 21.16 |
| PGRP | Clarita Mariano | 1,655 | 0.89 |
| Valid ballots | | 185,400 | 91.47 |
| Invalid or blank votes | | 17,293 | 8.53 |
| Total votes | | 202,693 | 100.00 |
| Lakas–Kampi hold | | | |

== See also ==
- Legislative districts of Nueva Ecija
