= Llanera, Nueva Ecija =

Municipality in Nueva Ecija, Philippines

Llanera
- Municipality
- Municipality of Llanera
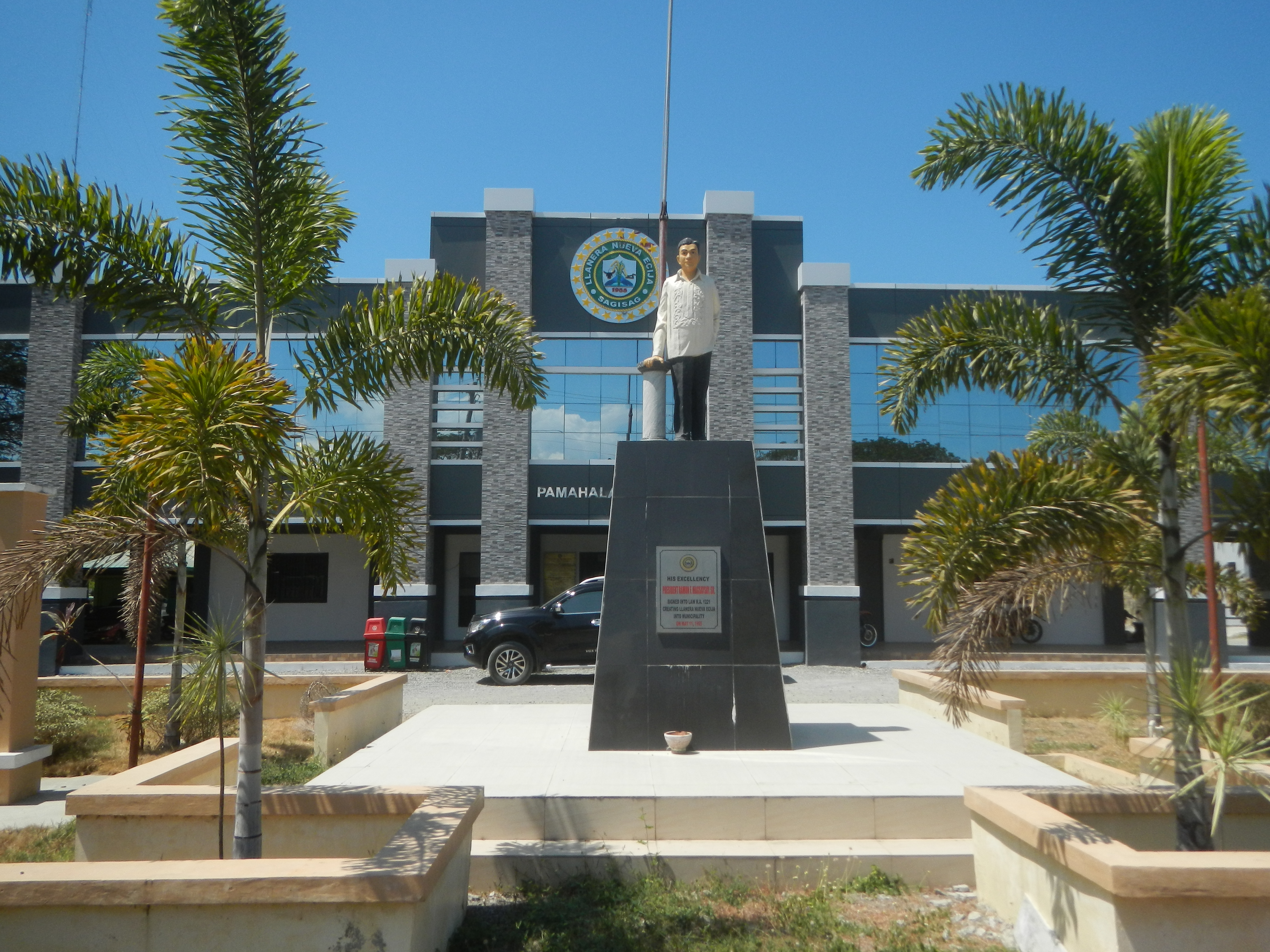
- Municipal Hall & Administration Building

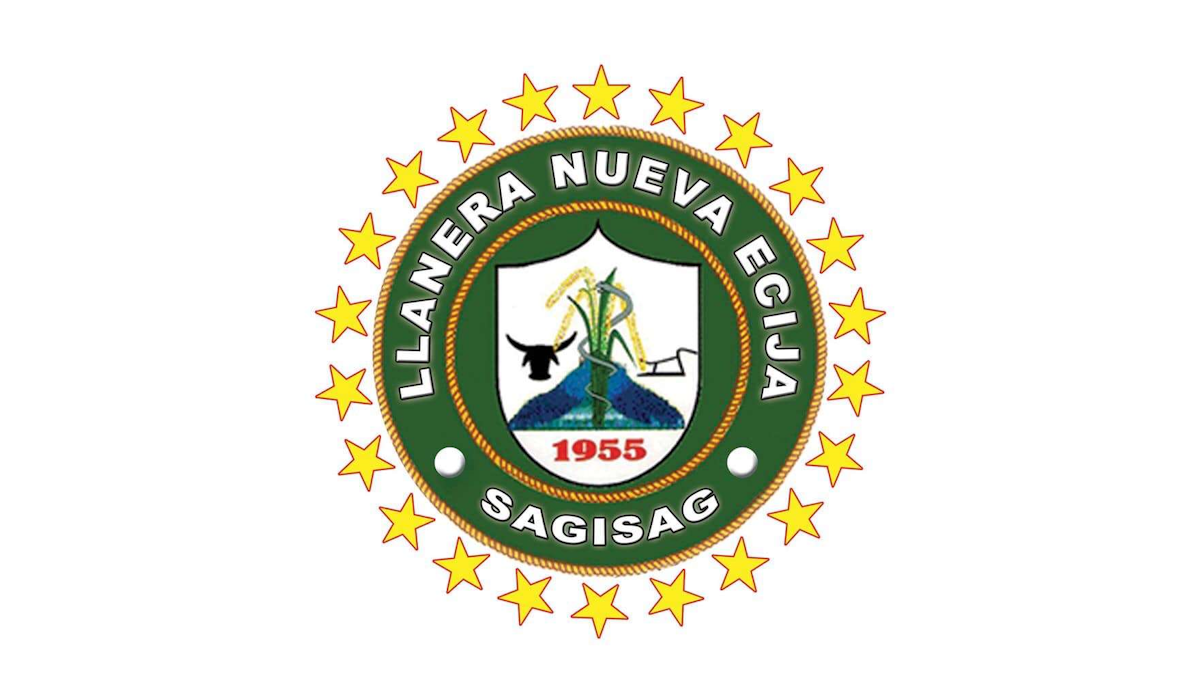
- Flag Seal

- Map of Nueva Ecija with Llanera highlighted
- Interactive map of Llanera
- Location within the Philippines
- Coordinates: 15°39′45″N 121°01′11″E
- Country: Philippines
- Region: Central Luzon
- Province: Nueva Ecija
- District: 2nd district
- Founded: May 11, 1955
- Named for: Gen. Mariano Llanera
- Barangays: 22 (see Barangays)

Government
  - Type: Sangguniang Bayan
  - Mayor: Marilou L. Pascual
  - Vice Mayor: Ronnie Roy G. Pascual
  - Representative: Mario O. Salvador
  - Municipal Council: Members: Annabel B. Salmo; Cherrie Pie C. Bugayong; Daisy P. Arocena; Elsa V. Gonzales; Cleofe C. Felix; Fabian M. Martin Jr.; Jonathan S. Santos; Juanito S. Bautista
  - Electorate: 27,254 voters (2025)

Area
  - Total: 114.44 km^{2} (44.19 sq mi)
- Elevation: 70 m (230 ft)
- Highest elevation: 97 m (318 ft)
- Lowest elevation: 53 m (174 ft)

Population (2024 census)
  - Total: 44,620
  - Density: 389.9/km^{2} (1,010/sq mi)
  - Households: 11,401

Economy
  - Income class: 2nd municipal income class
  - Poverty incidence: 9.52% (2023)
  - Revenue: ₱ 202.8 million (2024)
  - Assets: ₱ 1,192 million (2024)
  - Expenditure: ₱ 178.7 million (2024)
  - Liabilities: ₱ 736 million (2024)

Service provider
  - Electricity: Nueva Ecija 2 Area 2 Electric Cooperative (NEECO 2 A2)
- Time zone: UTC+8 (PST)
- ZIP code: 3126
- PSGC: 0304915000
- IDD : area code: +63 (0)44
- Native languages: Ilocano; Tagalog
- Website: www.llanera.gov.ph

Llanera, officially the Municipality of Llanera (Tagalog: Bayan ng Llanera, Ilocano: Ili ti Llanera), is a municipality in the province of Nueva Ecija, Philippines. According to the 2024 census, it has a population of 44,620 people.

The town's economy is largely agricultural, with rice as the principal product. It is a land of plains with few creeks, a small dam, and a river - the only bodies of water bisecting the plains. There are no mountain ranges in the municipality.

The principal industrial and commercial activities are related to the production of rice and related products. Minor products include onion growing, cattle raising and vegetable production. The town also known for its "Banuar A Mannalon Festival" it is usually celebrated every first to second week of May.

== History ==
During World War II, the local military establishment of the main general headquarters and main camp base of the Philippine Commonwealth Army was active in the area from 1942 to 1945. The 2nd Constabulary Regiment of the Philippine Constabulary was activated again from 1944 to 1946, and they were stationed in Llanera. From the clearing operations of the Anti-Japanese Imperial Military Operations in Central Luzon included the province of Pampanga, Nueva Ecija, Tarlac, Bulacan, Zambales and Northern Tayabas (now Aurora) from 1942 to 1945, and aiding various guerrilla groups and the American liberation forces of the U.S. Army and U.S. Army Air Forces and fought against the Japanese Imperial forces.

The town was created in 1954 from territory carved from the three neighboring towns:

- San Jose - barrios of Bagumbayan (townsite), Andres Bonifacio, Caridad Norte & Sur, San Mauricio (portion), Parang Manga (portion), Santa Barbara, Floridablanca, Gomez, San Francisco, and Victoria.
- Talavera - barrios of General Luna, Morcon, Mabini, Ricarte, Casili, and Picon, together with sitios Plaridel and Bosque.
- Rizal - barrios of San Felipe and San Alfonso.

== Geography ==
Llanera is located near the geographic center of the province. The municipality is traversed by a national road leading to Aurora province. The municipality is bounded by the city of San Jose, the municipalities of Talavera, Rizal, and General Mamerto Natividad.

Llanera is 23 kilometres (14 mi) from Cabanatuan, 37 kilometres (23 mi) from Palayan, and 139 kilometres (86 mi) from Manila.

=== Barangays ===
Llanera is politically subdivided into 22 barangays. Each barangay consist of puroks and some have sitios.

- A. Bonifacio (A. Bonifacio Sur)
- Bagumbayan (Poblacion)
- Bosque
- Caridad Norte
- Caridad Sur
- Casile
- Florida Blanca
- General Luna
- General Ricarte
- Gomez
- Inanama
- Ligaya
- Mabini
- Murcon
- Plaridel
- San Francisco (A. Bonifacio Norte)
- San Felipe
- San Nicolas
- San Vicente
- Santa Barbara
- Victoria
- Villa Viniegas

=== Climate ===
Climate data for Llanera, Nueva Ecija
Month	Jan	Feb	Mar	Apr	May	Jun	Jul	Aug	Sep	Oct	Nov	Dec	Year
Mean daily maximum °C (°F)	29 (84)	30 (86)	31 (88)	33 (91)	33 (91)	31 (88)	30 (86)	29 (84)	30 (86)	30 (86)	30 (86)	29 (84)	30 (87)
Mean daily minimum °C (°F)	19 (66)	19 (66)	20 (68)	22 (72)	23 (73)	24 (75)	24 (75)	24 (75)	24 (75)	22 (72)	21 (70)	20 (68)	22 (71)
Average precipitation mm (inches)	4 (0.2)	6 (0.2)	7 (0.3)	12 (0.5)	61 (2.4)	89 (3.5)	96 (3.8)	99 (3.9)	81 (3.2)	88 (3.5)	37 (1.5)	13 (0.5)	593 (23.5)
Average rainy days	2.5	3.0	4.1	6.3	15.8	19.4	22.5	21.6	20.1	17.5	9.6	4.0	146.4
Source: Meteoblue

== Demographics ==
Population census of Llanera
Year	Pop.	±% p.a.
1960	8,873	—
1970	12,985	+3.88%
1975	16,160	+4.48%
1980	18,652	+2.91%
1990	23,285	+2.24%
1995	28,127	+3.60%
2000	30,361	+1.65%
2007	33,493	+1.36%
2010	36,200	+2.87%
2015	39,701	+1.77%
2020	42,281	+1.33%
2024	44,620	+1.30%
Source: Philippine Statistics Authority

== Economy ==
Poverty incidence of Llanera (%)

Source: Philippine Statistics Authority

== Education ==
The Llanera Schools District Office governs all educational institutions within the municipality. It oversees the management and operations of all private and public, from primary to secondary schools.

=== Primary and elementary schools ===
- A. Bonifacio Norte Elementary School
- A. Bonifacio Sur Elementary School
- Bontoc Elementary School
- Bosque Elementary School
- Caridad Norte Elementary School
- Caridad Sur Elementary School
- Casile Elementary School
- Florida Blanca Elementary School
- General Luna Elementary School
- General Ricarte Elementary School
- Gomez Elementary School
- Inanama Elementary School
- Ligaya Elementary School
- Little Angels de San Jose School Foundation
- Llanera Central School
- Mabini Elementary School
- Murcon Elementary School
- Old Murcon Primary School
- San Alfonso Elementary School
- San Felipe Integrated School (Elementary)
- San Nicolas Primary School
- San Vicente Elementary School
- Sta. Barbara Integrated School (Elementary)
- Villa Viniegas Elementary School

=== Secondary schools ===
- Andres Bonifacio National High School
- General Luna National High School
- Llanera National High School
- San Felipe Integrated High School
