= Carranglan =

Municipality in Nueva Ecija, Philippines

Carranglan Kadanglaan
- Municipality
- Municipality of Carranglan
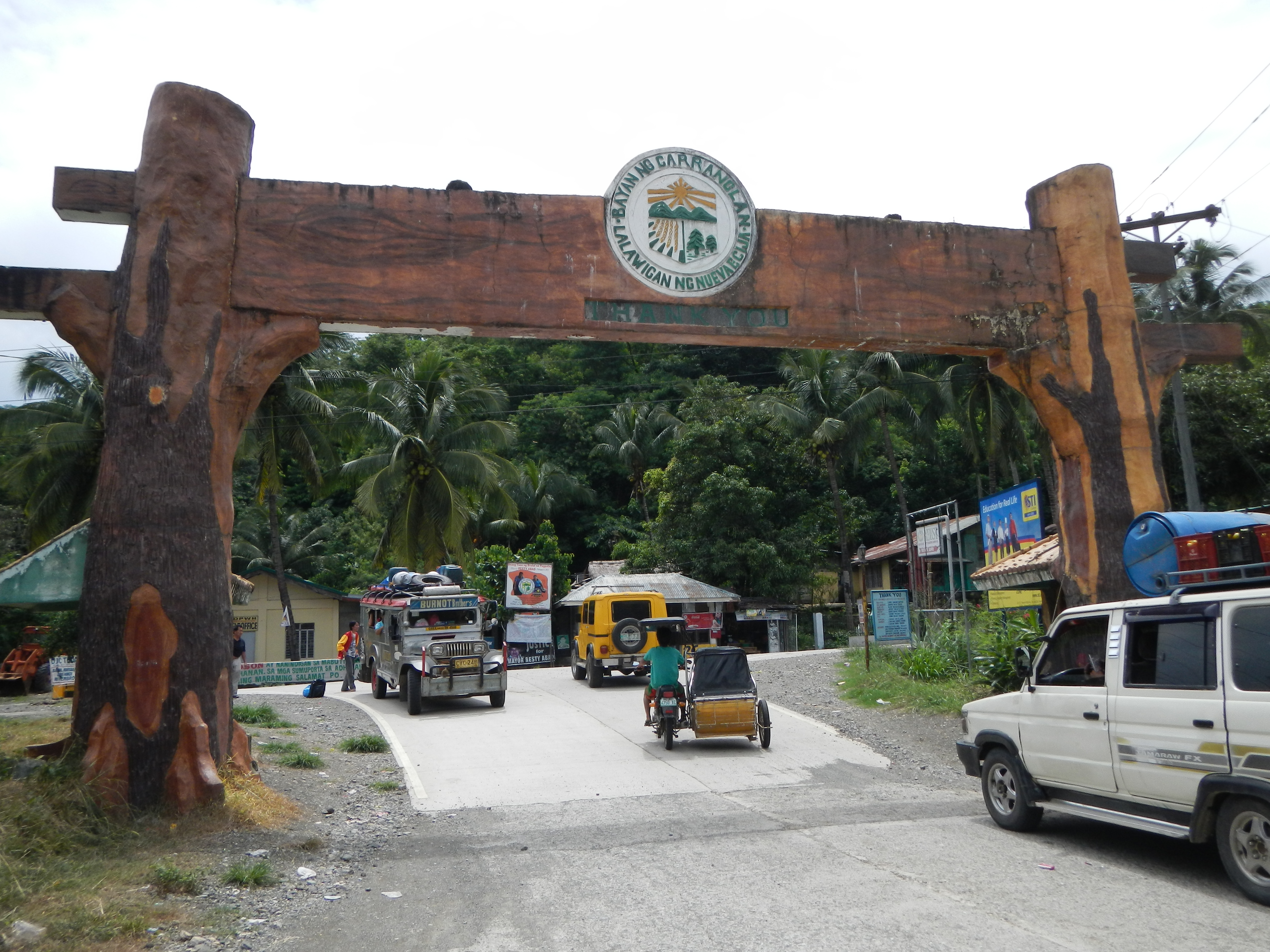
- Welcome arch

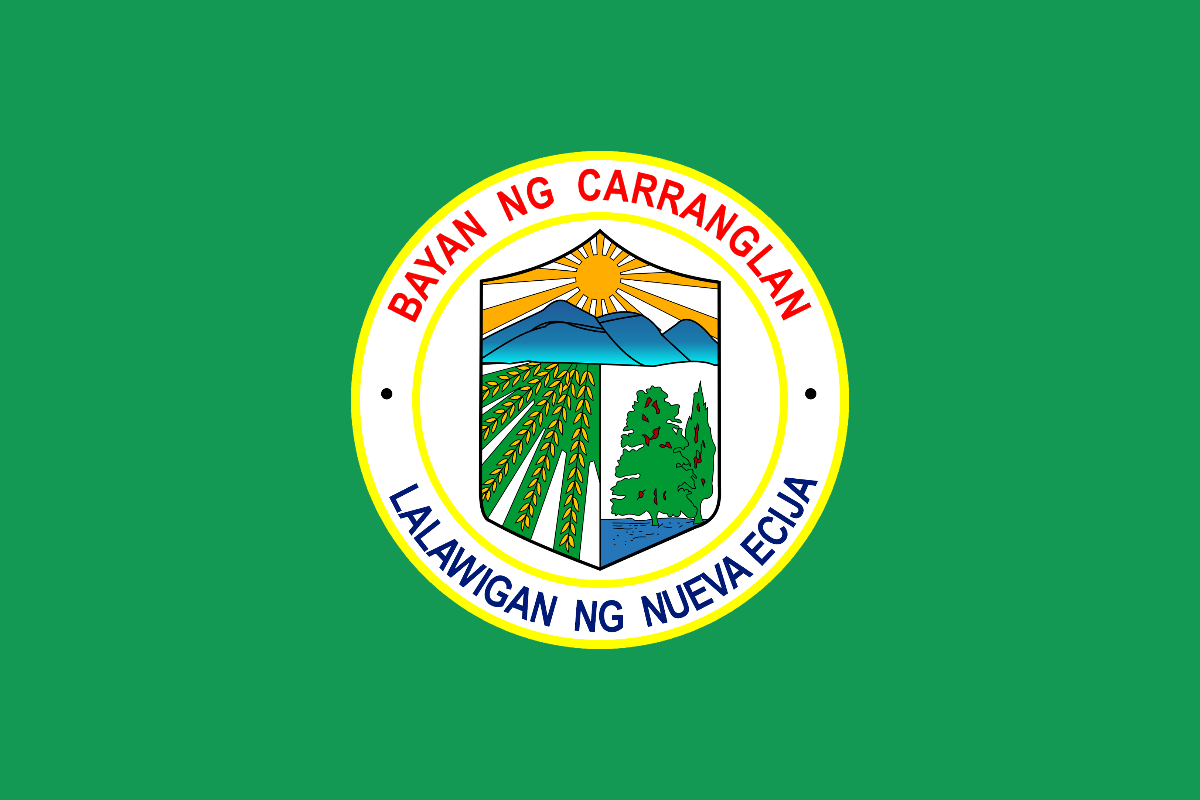
- Flag Seal

- Map of Nueva Ecija with Carranglan highlighted
- Interactive map of Carranglan
- Location within the Philippines Carranglan (Luzon) Carranglan (Nueva Ecija)
- Coordinates: 15°57′39″N 121°03′47″E
- Country: Philippines
- Region: Central Luzon
- Province: Nueva Ecija
- District: 2nd district
- Barangays: 17 (see Barangays)

Government
  - Type: Sangguniang Bayan
  - Mayor: Rogelio B. Abad
  - Vice Mayor: Ricardo C. Manucdoc
  - Representative: Mario O. Salvador
  - Municipal Council: Members: Ricardo C. Manucdoc; Rona D. Venturina; Novelita A. Doria; Lorena A. Mindanao; Rosalinda E. Ladores; Maria Luisa S. Cayabyab; Mauricio B. Baltazar; Isagani F. Andres
  - Electorate: 26,731 voters (2025)

Area
  - Total: 705.31 km^{2} (272.32 sq mi)
- Elevation: 305 m (1,001 ft)
- Highest elevation: 632 m (2,073 ft)
- Lowest elevation: 210 m (690 ft)

Population (2024 census)
  - Total: 43,694
  - Density: 61.950/km^{2} (160.45/sq mi)
  - Households: 10,440

Economy
  - Income class: 1st municipal income class
  - Poverty incidence: 15.64% (2023)
  - Revenue: ₱ 332.9 million (2024)
  - Assets: ₱ 1,238 million (2024)
  - Expenditure: ₱ 285.4 million (2024)
  - Liabilities: ₱ 241 million (2024)

Service provider
  - Electricity: Nueva Ecija 2 Area 1 Electric Cooperative (NEECO 2 A1)
- Time zone: UTC+8 (PST)
- ZIP code: 3123
- PSGC: 0304905000
- IDD : area code: +63 (0)44
- Native languages: Ilocano; Tagalog

Carranglan, officially the Municipality of Carranglan (Ilocano: Ili ti Carranglan; Pangasinan: Baley na Carranglan; Tagalog: Bayan ng Carranglan), is a municipality in the province of Nueva Ecija, Philippines. According to the 2024 census, it has a population of 43,694 people.

The municipality is home to the Pantabangan–Carranglan Watershed Forest Reserve.

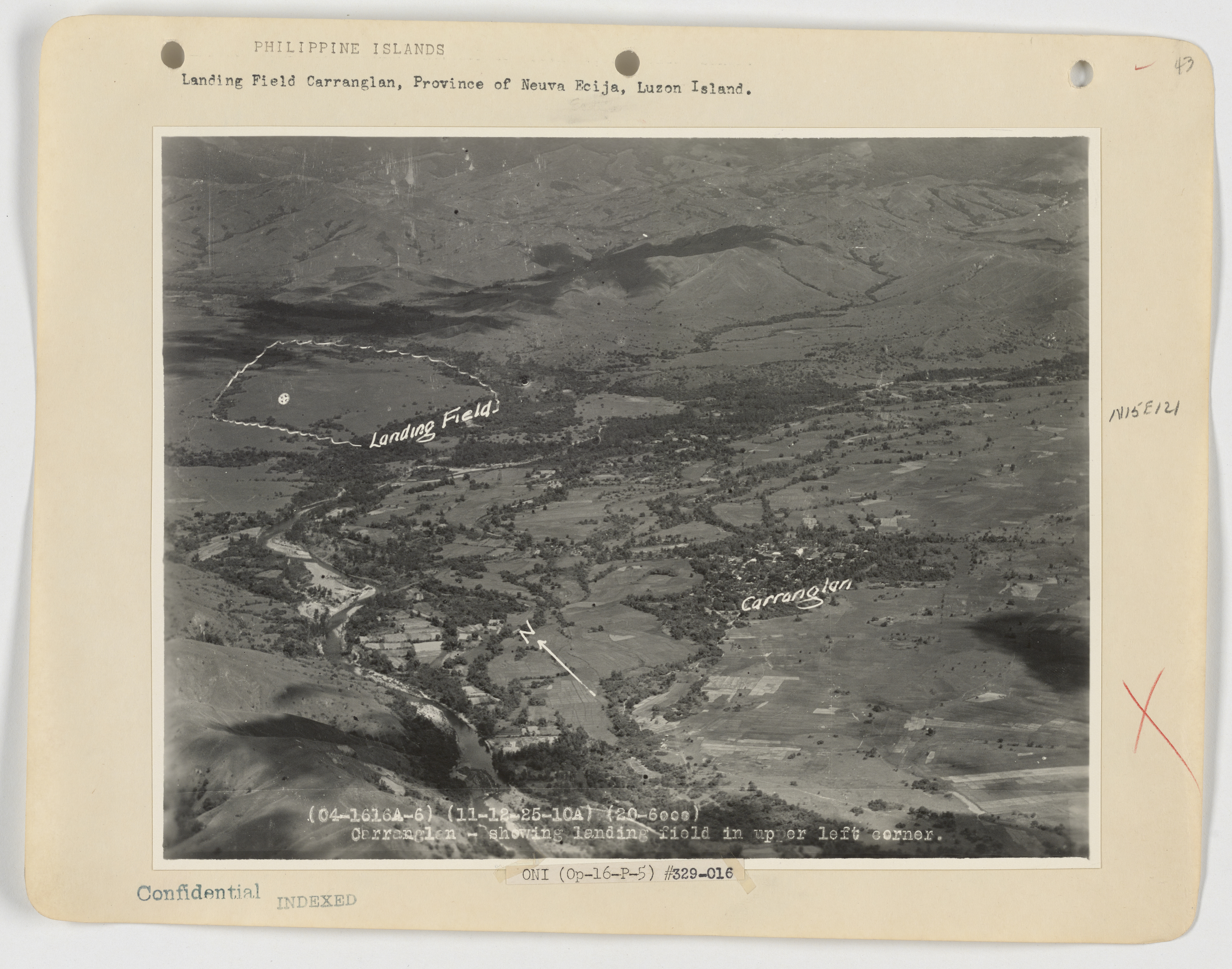
Aerial view of Carranglan, date unknown

== Geography ==
With an area spanning 705.13 km^{2}, t is the province's largest municipality in terms of land area.

=== Barangays ===
Carranglan is politically subdivided into 17 barangays. Each barangay consists of puroks and some have sitios.

- Baluarte (now R.A. Padilla)
- Bantug
- Bunga
- Burgos
- Capintalan
- Digdig (now called Joson)
- General Luna
- Minuli
- Piut
- Puncan
- Putlan
- Salazar
- San Agustin
- T. L. Padilla Pob. (Barangay I)
- F. C. Otic Pob. (Barangay II)
- D. L. Maglanoc Pob. (BarangayIII)
- G. S. Rosario Pob. (Barangay IV)

=== Climate ===
Climate data for Carranglan, Nueva Ecija
Month	Jan	Feb	Mar	Apr	May	Jun	Jul	Aug	Sep	Oct	Nov	Dec	Year
Mean daily maximum °C (°F)	28 (82)	29 (84)	30 (86)	32 (90)	31 (88)	30 (86)	29 (84)	28 (82)	29 (84)	29 (84)	29 (84)	28 (82)	29 (85)
Mean daily minimum °C (°F)	18 (64)	19 (66)	20 (68)	22 (72)	23 (73)	23 (73)	23 (73)	23 (73)	23 (73)	22 (72)	20 (68)	19 (66)	21 (70)
Average precipitation mm (inches)	13 (0.5)	15 (0.6)	21 (0.8)	33 (1.3)	92 (3.6)	121 (4.8)	142 (5.6)	124 (4.9)	121 (4.8)	143 (5.6)	50 (2.0)	22 (0.9)	897 (35.4)
Average rainy days	6.0	6.4	9.2	12.2	20.3	23.1	25.1	22.5	22.4	20.0	11.6	7.1	185.9
Source: Meteoblue (Use with caution: this is modeled/calculated data, not measured locally.)

== Demographics ==
Population census of Carranglan
Year	Pop.	±% p.a.
1903	1,468	—
1918	2,716	+4.19%
1939	6,339	+4.12%
1948	6,328	−0.02%
1960	10,100	+3.97%
1970	15,536	+4.39%
1975	16,875	+1.67%
1980	19,891	+3.34%
1990	26,064	+2.74%
1995	29,950	+2.64%
2000	31,720	+1.24%
2007	33,233	+0.64%
2010	37,124	+4.11%
2015	41,131	+1.97%
2020	42,420	+0.65%
2024	43,694	+0.71%
Source: Philippine Statistics Authority

== Economy ==
Poverty incidence of Carranglan (%)

Source: Philippine Statistics Authority

== Education ==
The Carranglan Schools District Office governs all educational institutions within the municipality. It oversees the management and operations of all private and public, from primary to secondary schools.

=== Primary and elementary schools ===
- Abebeg Elementary School
- Baluarte Elementary School
- Bantug Elementary School
- Bunga Elementary School
- Burgos Elementary School
- Camanggahan Elementary School
- Capintalan Elementary School
- Carranglan Central School
- Carranglan United Methodist Church Learning Center
- Daldalayap Elementary School
- Digdig-Joson Elementary School
- Maringalo Elementary School
- Mount Gerizim Christian School
- Nagcancionan Elementary School
- Red Cross Village Elementary School
- Minuli Elementary School
- Obito Elementary School
- Piut Elementary School
- Puncan Elementary School
- Putlan Elementary School
- Salazar Elementary School
- San Agustin Elementary School

=== Secondary schools ===
- Binbin Integrated School
- Burgos National High School
- Capintalan High School
- Carranglan National High School
- Digdig High School
- Gen. Luna Integrated School

== Gallery ==
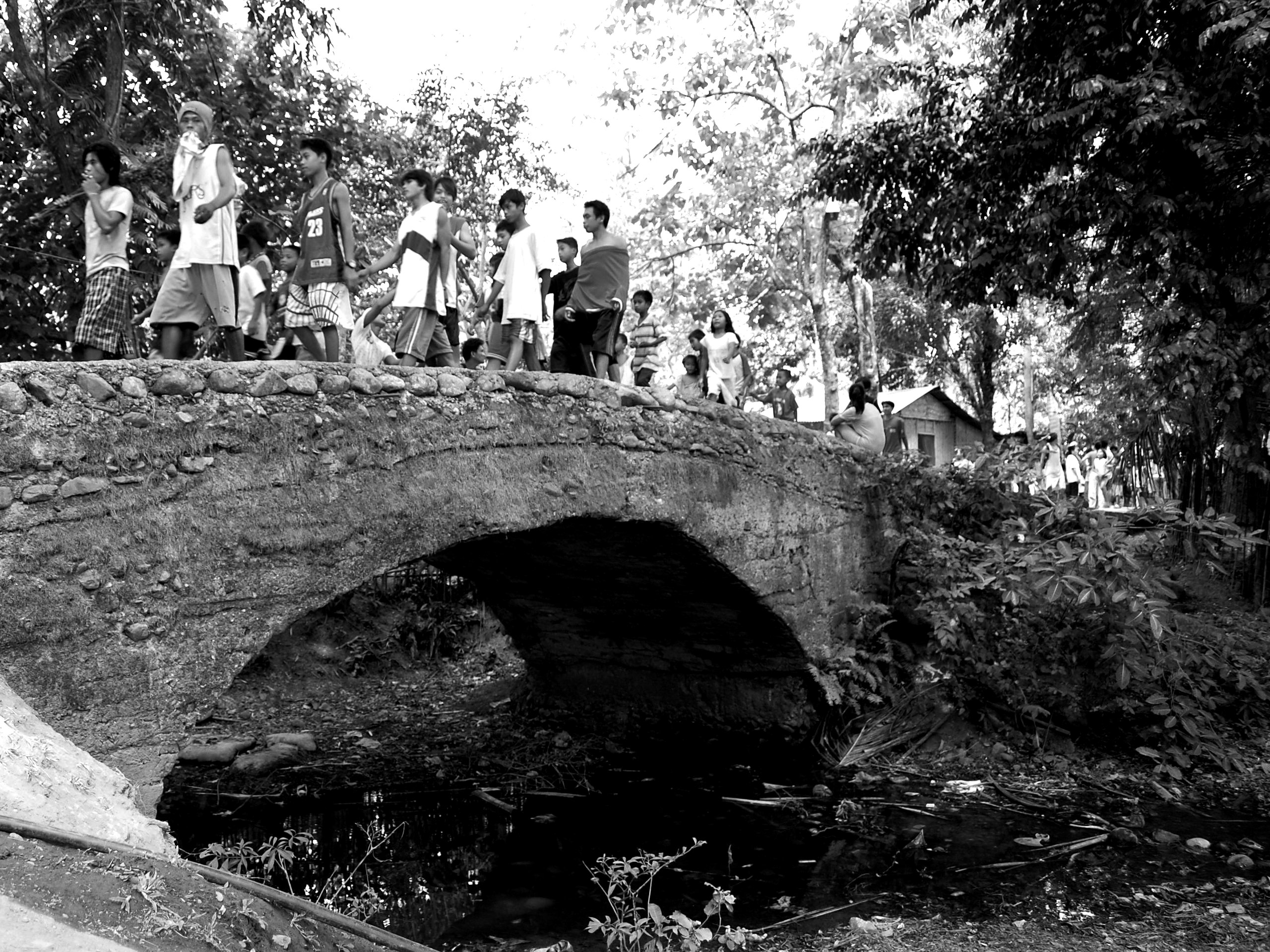
Spanish-built bridge in Carranglan

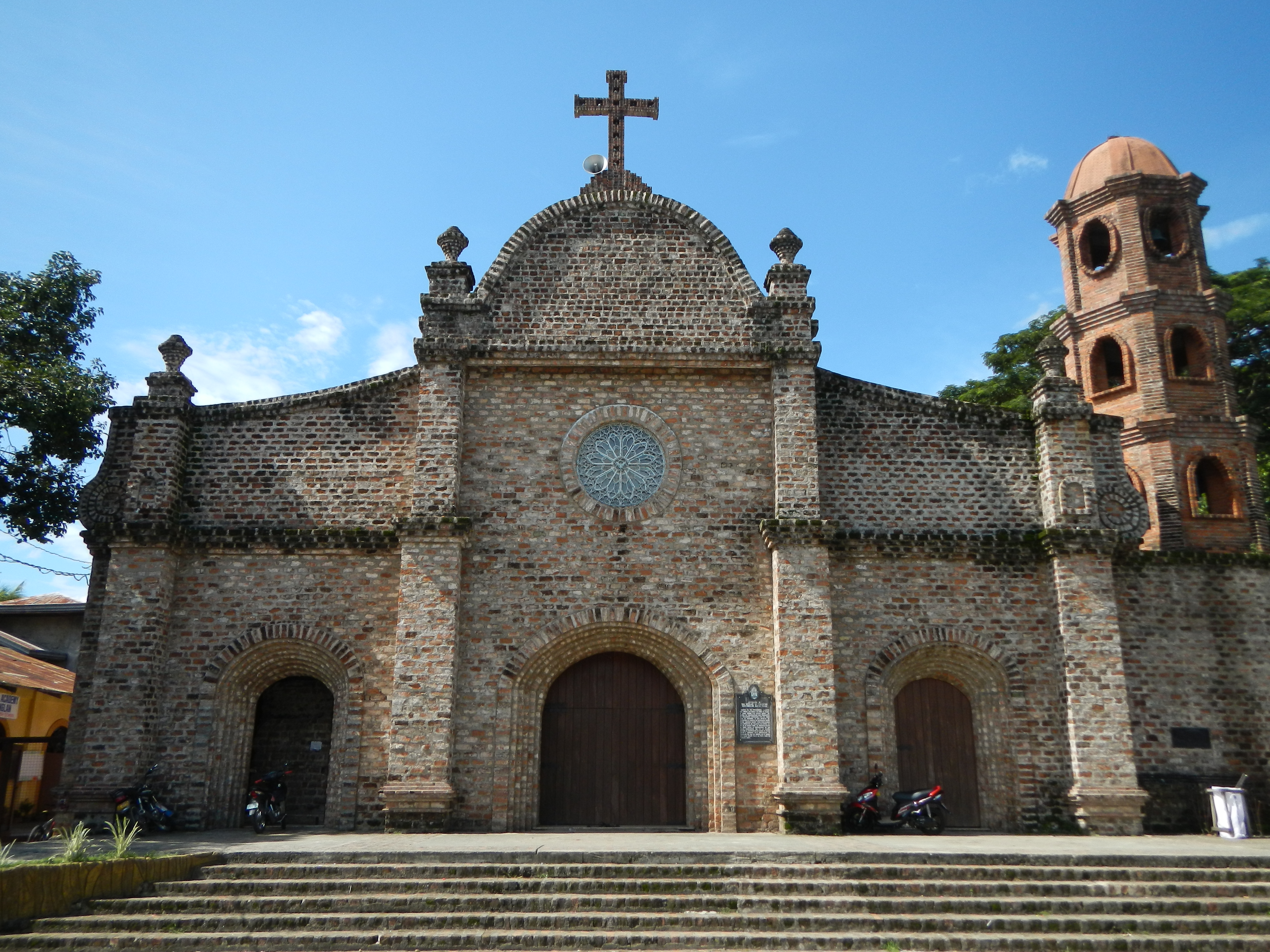
Saint Nicolas of Tolentine Parish Church

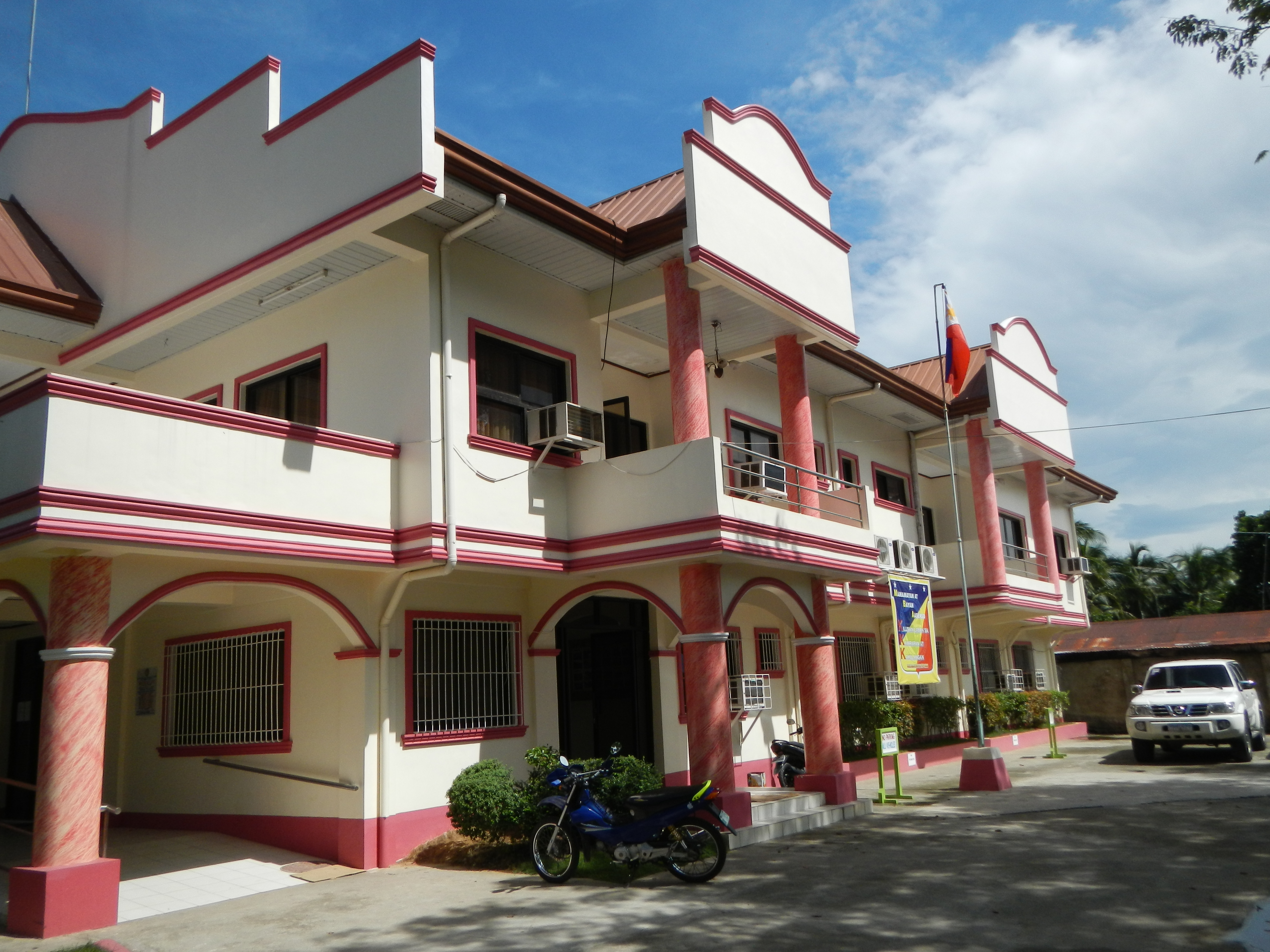
Carranglan Municipal Hall

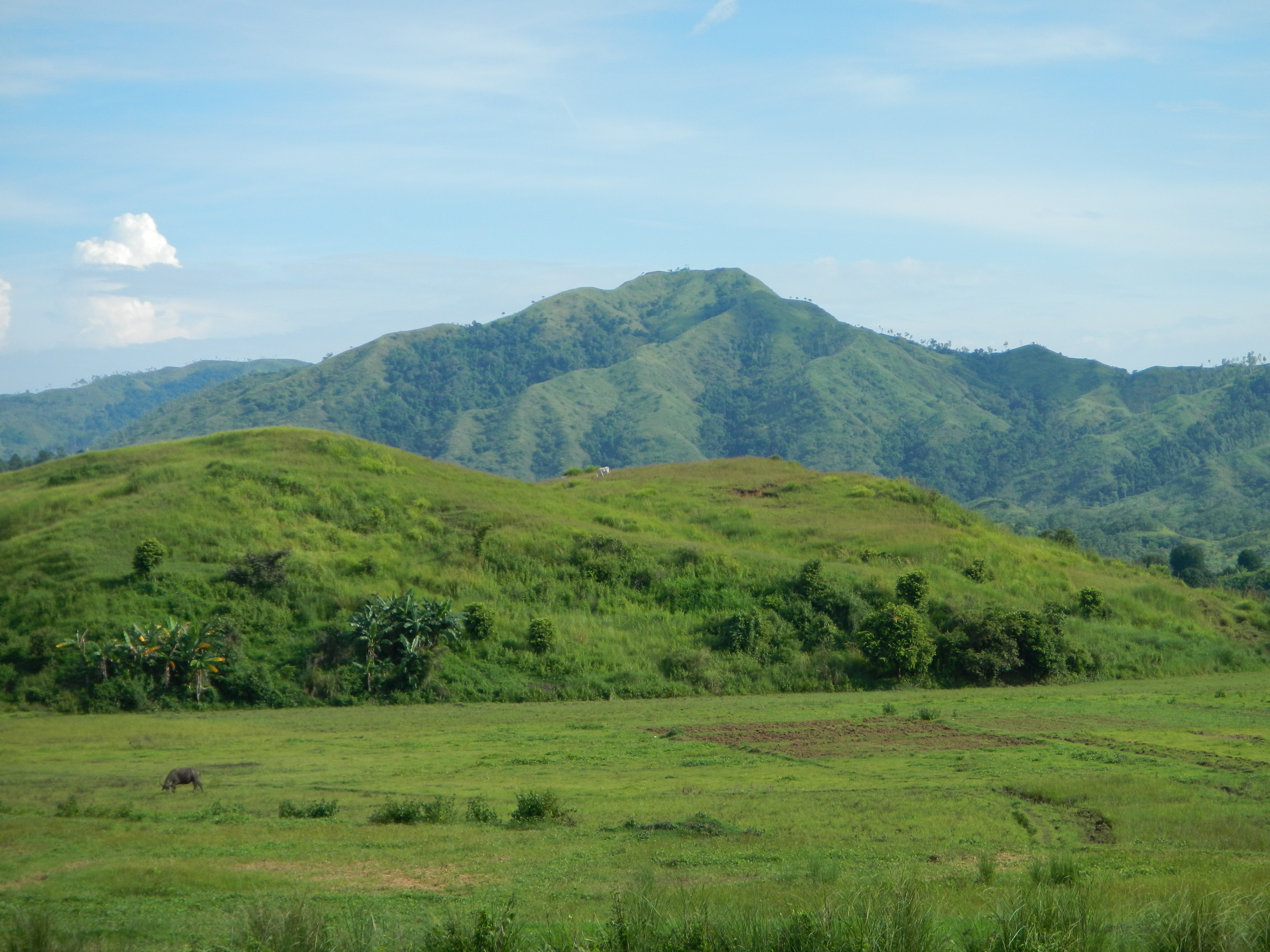
The mountains of Sierra Madre, located east of the municipality

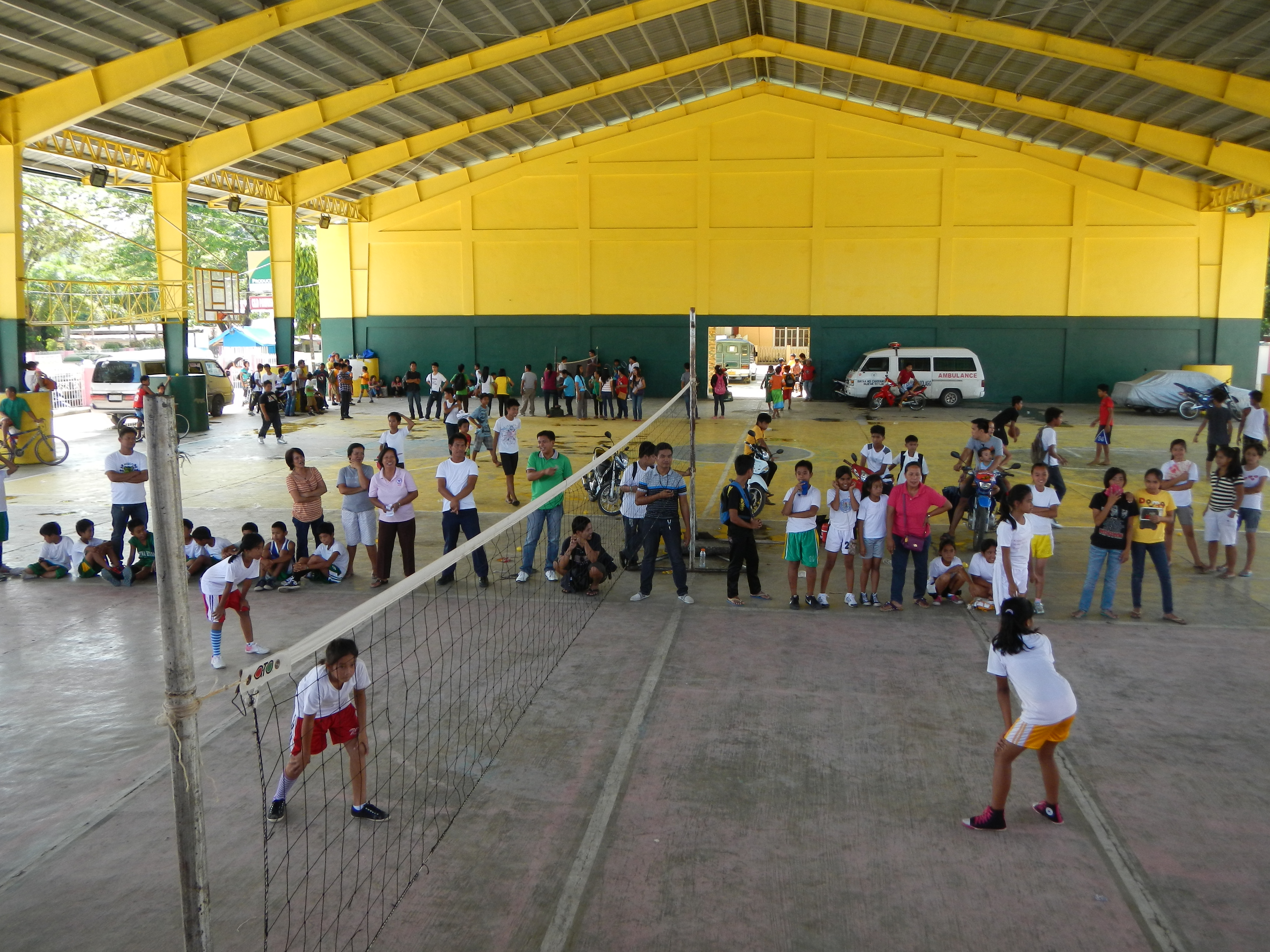
Carranglan's Gymnasium

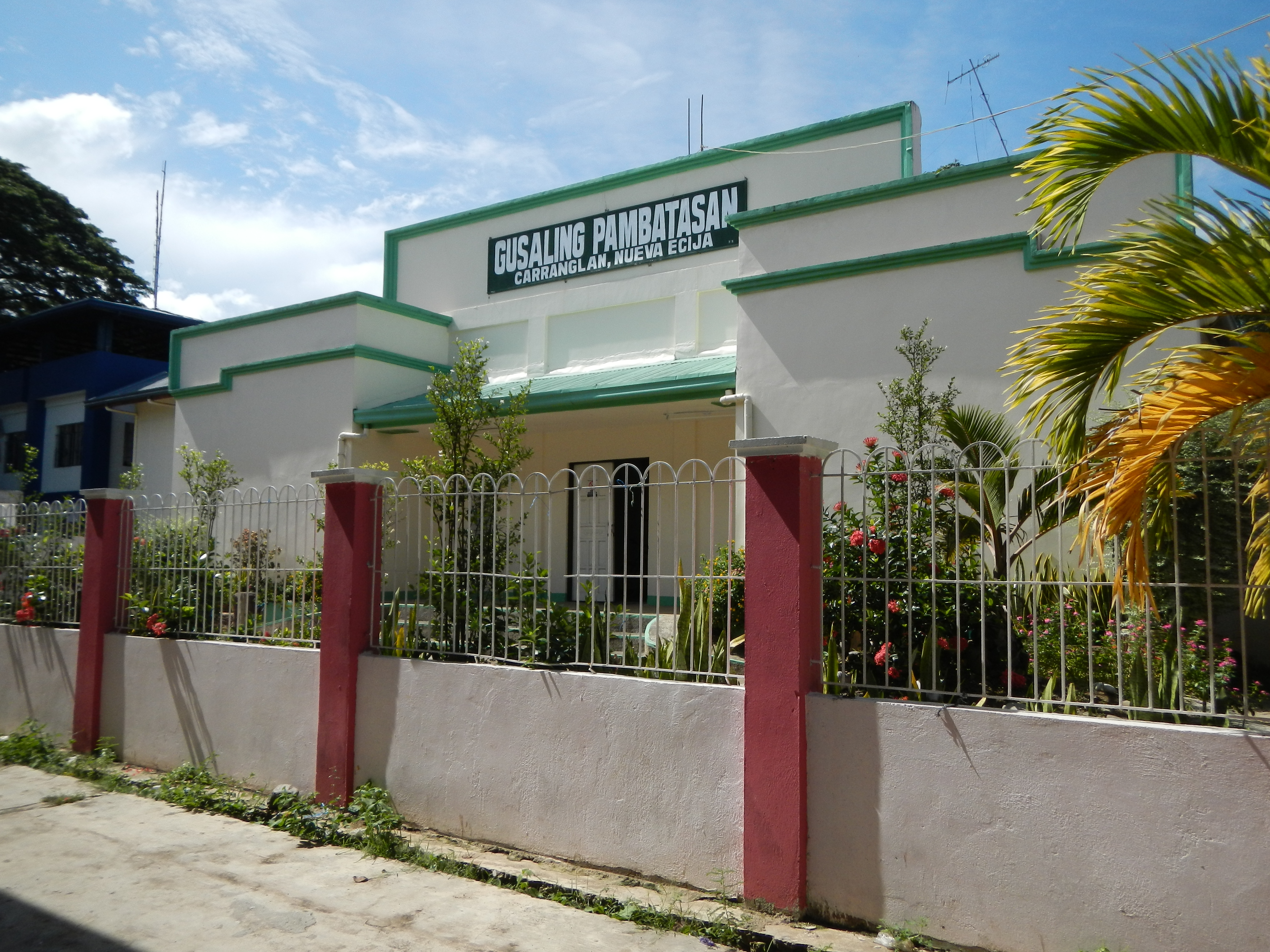
Legislative building

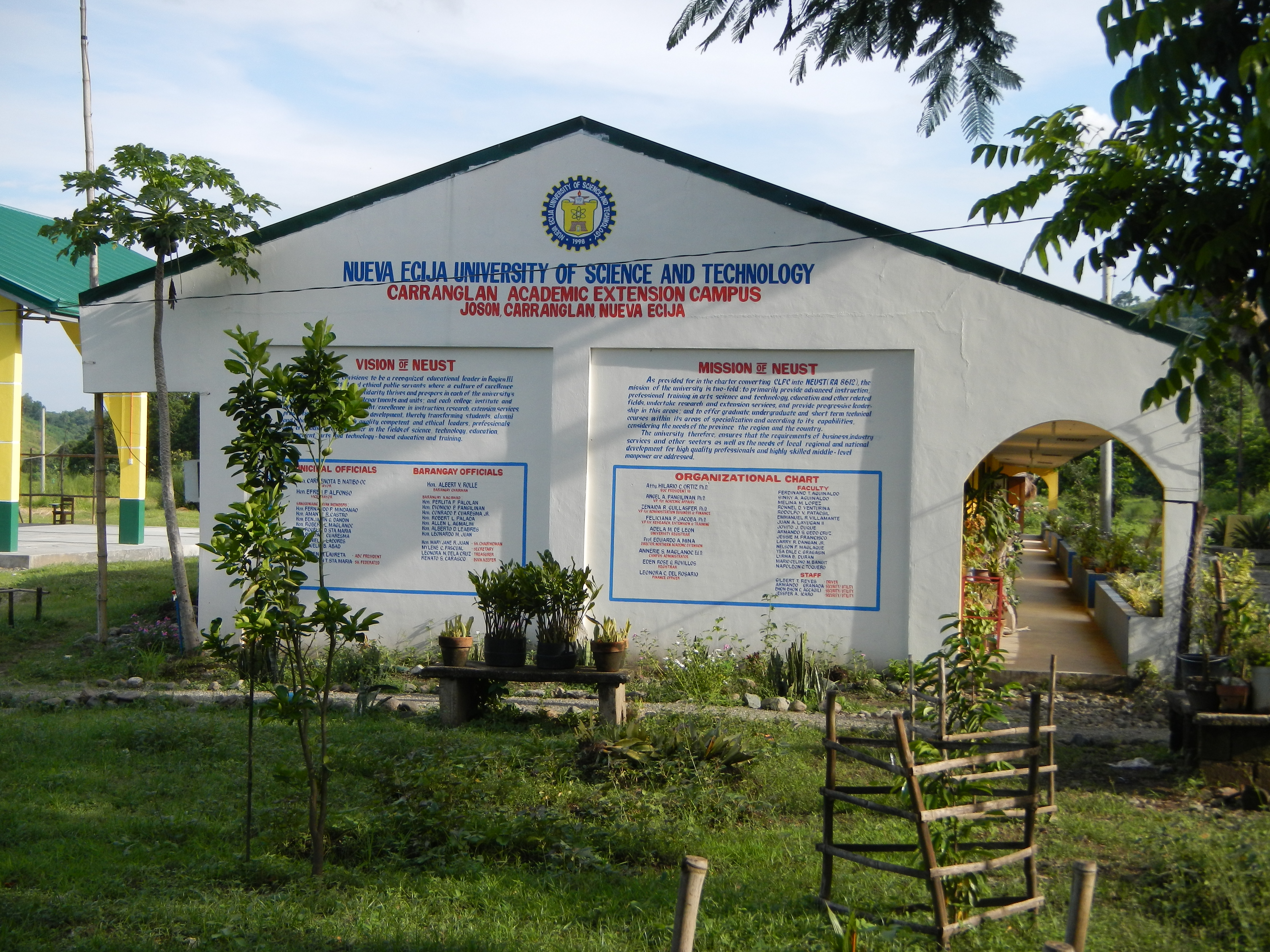
Nueva Ecija University of Science and Technology - Carranglan Off-Campus

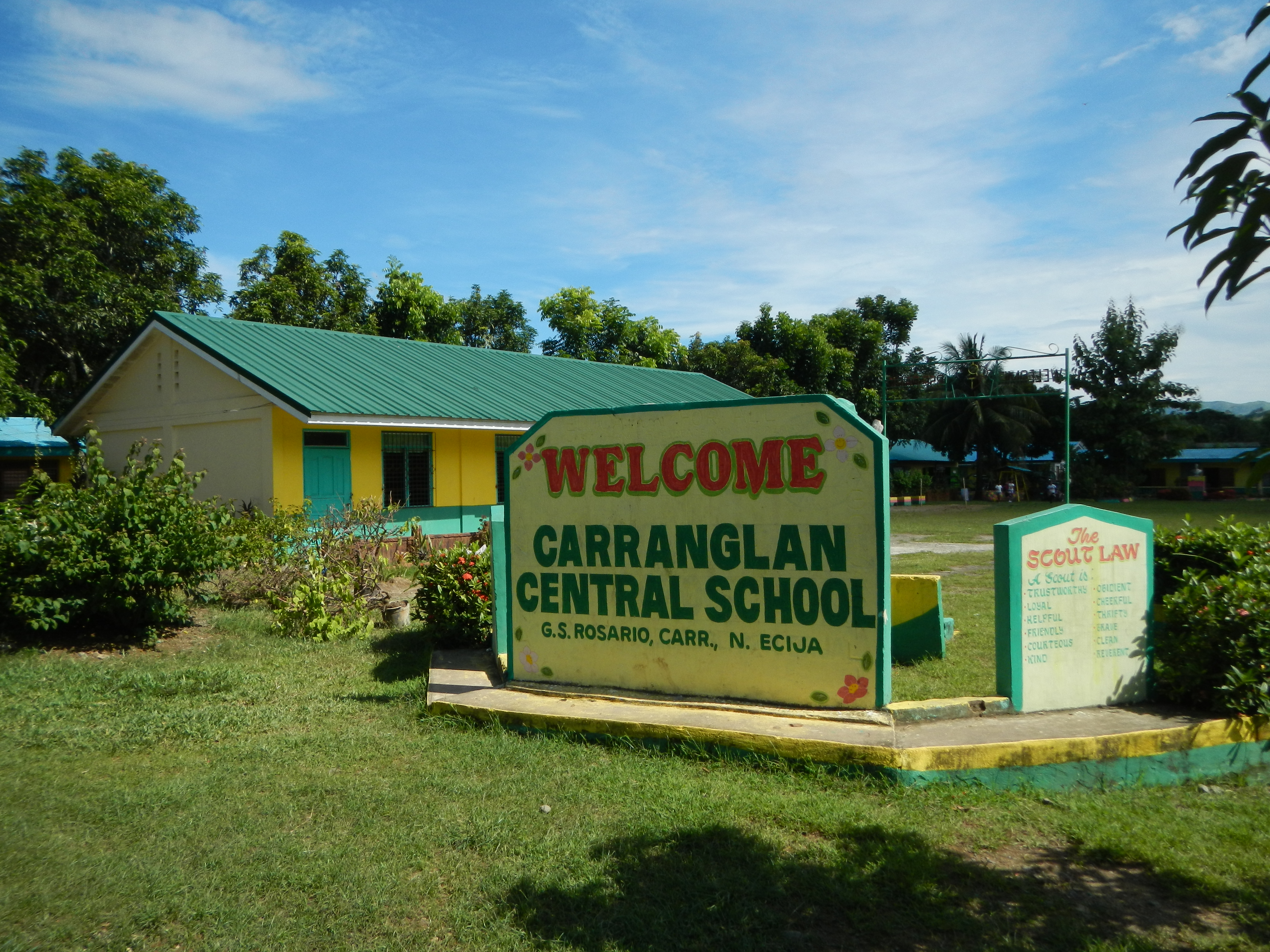
Carranglan Central School
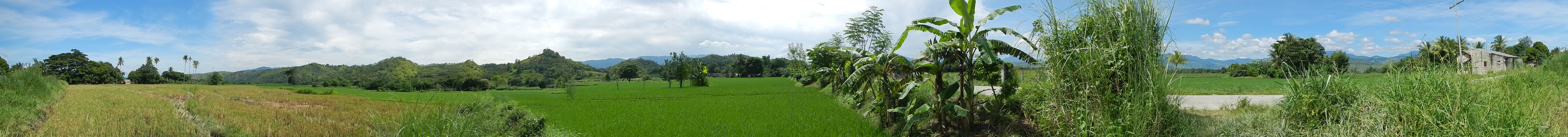
Carranglan panorama
