= Talugtug =

Municipality in Nueva Ecija, Philippines

- Municipality
- Municipality of Talugtug
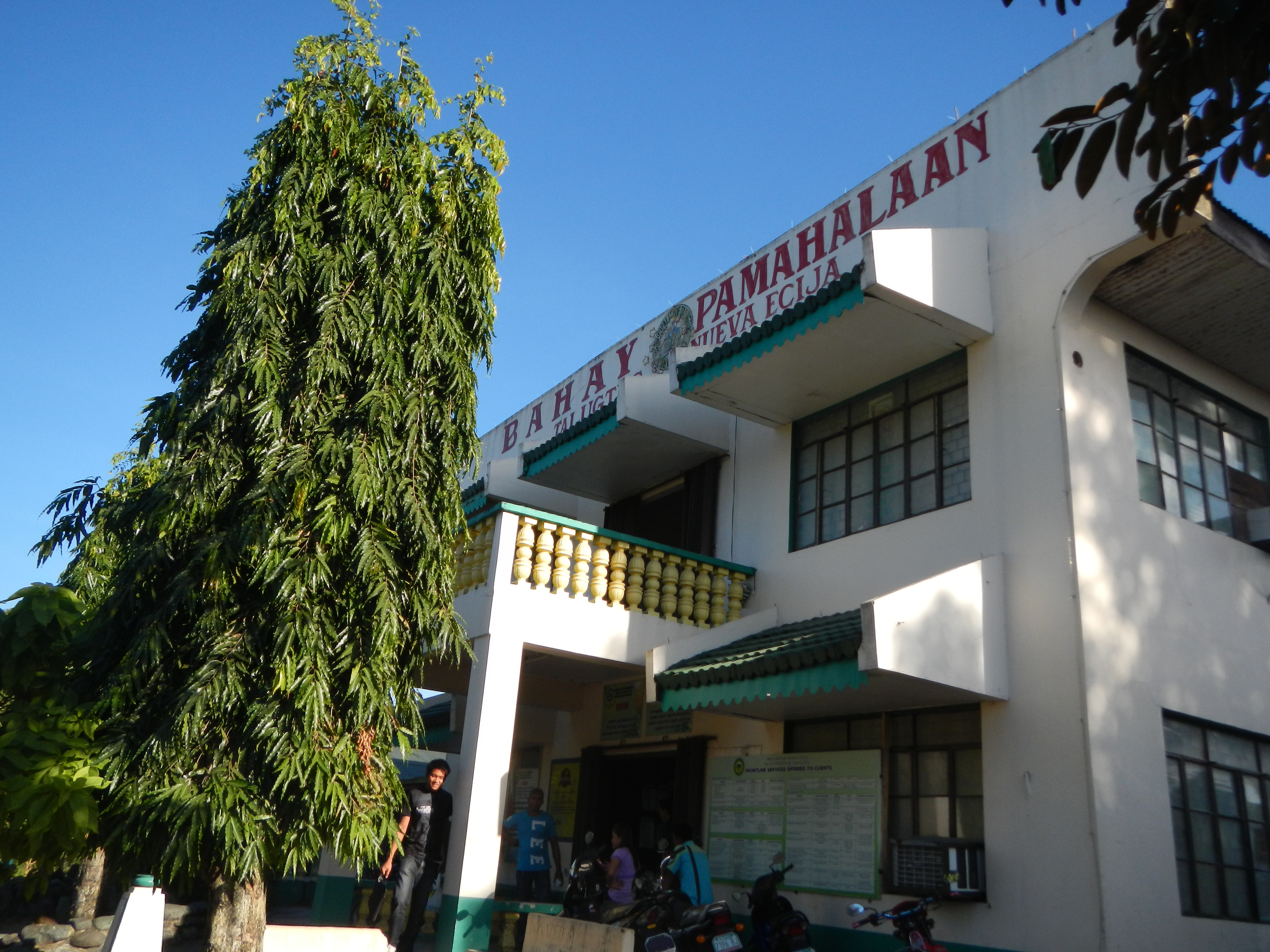
- Talugtug Municipal Hall

- Seal

- Map of Nueva Ecija with Talugtug highlighted
- Interactive map of Talugtug
- Location within the Philippines
- Coordinates: 15°46′44″N 120°48′40″E
- Country: Philippines
- Region: Central Luzon
- Province: Nueva Ecija
- District: 2nd district
- Barangays: 28 (see Barangays)

Government
  - Type: Sangguniang Bayan
  - Mayor: Pacifico B. Monta
  - Vice Mayor: Floro C. Pagaduan Jr.
  - Representative: Micaela S. Violago
  - Municipal Council: Members: Fe C. Cargamento; Emilio C. Dar; Benjamin A. Evangelista; Reynaldo O. Flora; Freddie S. Domingo; Dionisio D. Espanto Jr.; Elmer F. Caspillo; Johnny A. Sabatin
  - Electorate: 17,663 voters (2025)

Area
  - Total: 93.95 km^{2} (36.27 sq mi)
- Elevation: 85 m (279 ft)
- Highest elevation: 196 m (643 ft)
- Lowest elevation: 52 m (171 ft)

Population (2024 census)
  - Total: 26,469
  - Density: 281.7/km^{2} (729.7/sq mi)
  - Households: 6,702

Economy
  - Income class: 3rd municipal income class
  - Poverty incidence: 10.2% (2023)
  - Revenue: ₱ 173.9 million (2024)
  - Assets: ₱ 513.9 million (2024)
  - Expenditure: ₱ 176.1 million (2024)
  - Liabilities: ₱ 211.5 million (2024)

Service provider
  - Electricity: Nueva Ecija 2 Area 1 Electric Cooperative (NEECO 2 A1)
- Time zone: UTC+8 (PST)
- ZIP code: 3118
- PSGC: 0304931000
- IDD : area code: +63 (0)44
- Native languages: Ilocano; Tagalog
- Website: Official website

Talugtug, officially the Municipality of Talugtug (Ilocano: Ili ti Talugtug; Tagalog: Bayan ng Talugtug), is a municipality in the province of Nueva Ecija, Philippines. According to the 2024 census, it has a population of 26,469 people.

== History ==
=== Oldest settlements ===
The oldest settlement in the town was found on a hilltop near the present-day Cuyapo-Munos trail, where a sacred balete tree stood and travelers and farmers came to rest. The area later became known as Talugtug-Balete, which became a barrio of the Municipality of Cuyapo in 1917. A part of the barrio was later absorbed into the Municipality of Guimba and became the barrio of San Isidro. During this time, Mariano Mendoza, Pablo Dacayo, Andres Dumandan and Severino Cachuela became the tenientes del barrio of old Talugtug.

=== Establishment as a municipality ===
After World War II, members of the town held a meeting on November 3, 1946, to launch the proposed creation of a separate municipality. The meeting was chaired by Romualdo Estillore, with aid from officers Aniceto Feliciano, Simeon Ramos, and Fermin Ancheta, while the campaign for the town's creation was heavily supported by the locals. The proposal was presented to the provincial board on December 6, 1946, and approved on February 12, 1947. On January 10, 1948, President Manuel Roxas signed Executive Order No. 113, officially creating Talutug as the 26th municipality of Nueva Ecija.

=== Talugtug massacre ===
In 1982, the Talugtug massacre occurred, where the Marcos-controlled military roused seven commonfolk Ilocanos Talugtug residents from their sleep, accused them of being part the anti-dictatorship resistance, and killed five - Gavino Cenese, David Vergel, Jaime Besis, Fernando Sardan, and Dominador Ramos while another two, Severino Bela and Gaudencio Dulay, were never seen again."

== Geography ==
The municipality is situated in the northern part of Nueva Ecija, about 71 kilometres (44 mi) from the seat of the provincial government in Palayan City; 169 kilometres (105 mi) from Manila; and 29 kilometres (18 mi) from the nearby City of San Jose. It is bounded on the South by the Municipality of Guimba; on the southeast by the Science City of Muñoz; on the west by Cuyapo, on the east by Lupao, all of which are in the province of Nueva Ecija. On the northernmost side of Talugtug is the boundary of Pangasinan with the municipality of Umingan. Talugtug has a total land area of 10,122.2324 hectares (25,012.581 acres).

Talugtug is characterized by hilly and rolling land in the north-eastern and north-western section of the municipality covering almost 7 barangays. The foot of two mountain ranges, namely Mt. Baloy (with peak in Cuyapo) and Mt. Amorong (with peak in Umingan, Pangasinan) occupies its hilly and rolling areas.

About 70% of the land is flat and constitutes the agricultural area of the municipality, where almost 75% of its total rice production comes from.

=== Climate ===
Climate data for Talavera, Nueva Ecija
Month	Jan	Feb	Mar	Apr	May	Jun	Jul	Aug	Sep	Oct	Nov	Dec	Year
Mean daily maximum °C (°F)	29 (84)	30 (86)	31 (88)	33 (91)	33 (91)	31 (88)	30 (86)	29 (84)	29 (84)	30 (86)	30 (86)	29 (84)	30 (87)
Mean daily minimum °C (°F)	19 (66)	19 (66)	20 (68)	22 (72)	23 (73)	24 (75)	24 (75)	24 (75)	23 (73)	22 (72)	21 (70)	20 (68)	22 (71)
Average precipitation mm (inches)	4 (0.2)	6 (0.2)	7 (0.3)	12 (0.5)	61 (2.4)	89 (3.5)	96 (3.8)	99 (3.9)	81 (3.2)	88 (3.5)	37 (1.5)	13 (0.5)	593 (23.5)
Average rainy days	2.5	3.0	4.1	6.3	15.8	19.4	22.5	21.6	20.1	17.5	9.6	4.0	146.4
Source: Meteoblue

=== Barangays ===
Talugtug is politically subdivided into 28 barangays, as shown below. Each barangay consists of puroks and some have sitios.

- Alula
- Baybayabas
- Buted
- Cabiangan
- Calisitan
- Cinense
- Culiat
- Maasin
- Magsaysay (Poblacion)
- Mayamot I
- Mayamot II
- Nangabulan
- Osmeña (Poblacion)
- Villa Fronda
- Patola
- Quezon (Poblacion)
- Quirino (Poblacion)
- Roxas (Poblacion)
- Saguing
- Sampaloc
- Santa Catalina
- Santo Domingo
- Saverona
- Tandoc
- Tibag
- Villa Rosario
- Villa Rosenda (formerly Saringaya)
- Villa Boado

== Demographics ==
Population census of Talugtug

Year	Pop.	±% p.a.
1948	5,127	—
1960	8,808	+4.61%
1970	10,702	+1.96%
1975	12,225	+2.70%
1980	11,734	−0.82%
1990	14,106	+1.86%
1995	18,119	+4.80%

Year	Pop.	±% p.a.
2000	18,895	+0.90%
2007	20,671	+1.25%
2010	21,291	+1.08%
2015	23,817	+2.16%
2020	25,236	+1.23%
2024	26,469	+1.15%

Source: Philippine Statistics Authority

== Economy ==
Poverty incidence of Talugtug (%)

Source: Philippine Statistics Authority

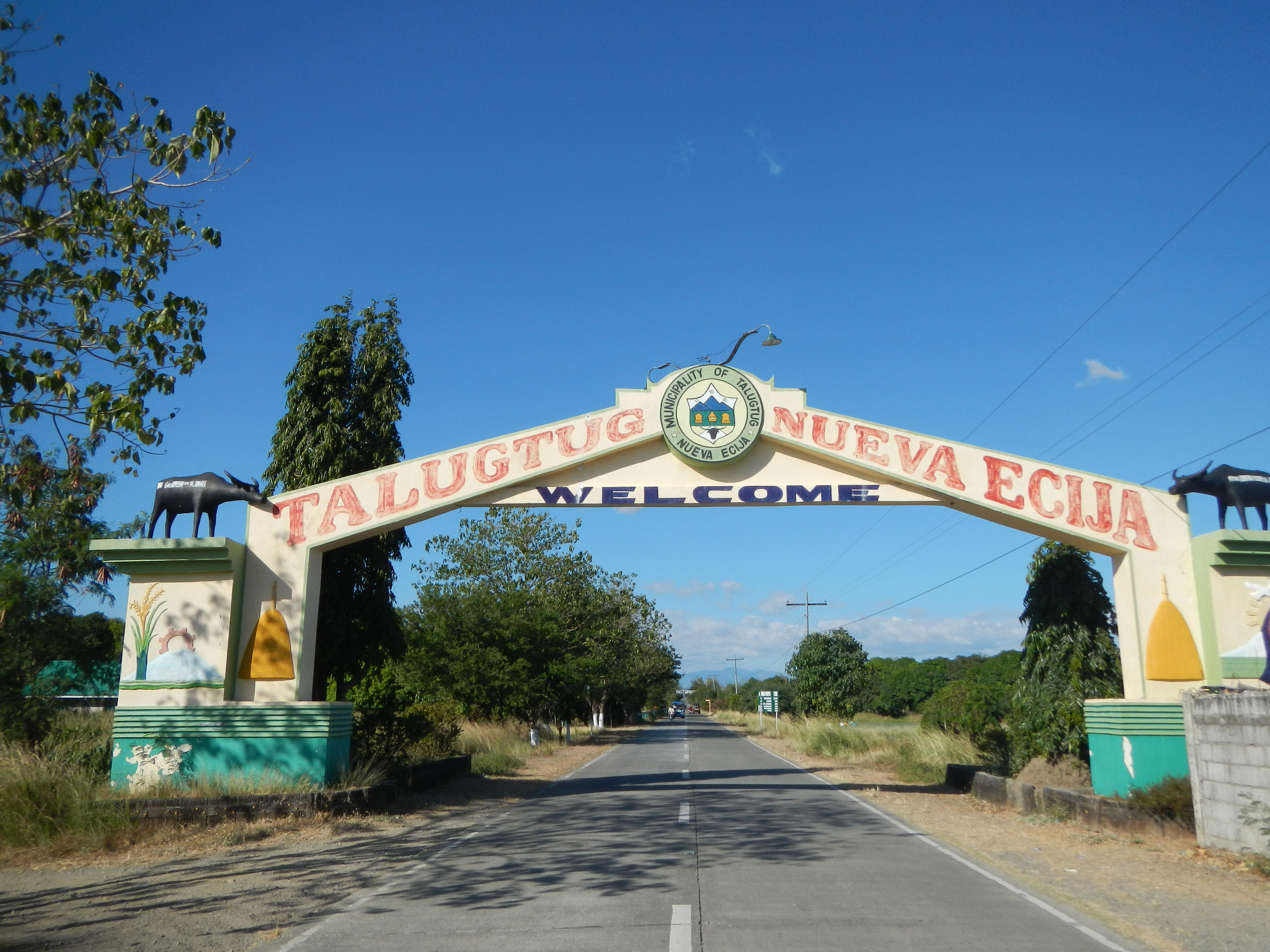
Talugtug welcome arch

The municipality's status is currently fourth class. Majority of the inhabitants rely mainly on farming from their small farm holdings while the rest depend on pasturing animals.

== Education ==
The Talugtug Schools District Office governs all educational institutions within the municipality. It oversees the management and operations of all private and public, from primary to secondary schools.

=== Primary and elementary schools ===
- Alberto G. Bautista Elementary School
- Alula Elementary School
- Baybayabas Elementary School
- Buted Primary School
- Calisitan Elementary School
- Culiat Elementary School
- Fronda Elementary School (Pangit)
- Funshine Science School
- Liceo De Christ the King
- Maasin Elementary School
- Mayamot I Elementary School
- Nangabulan Elementary School
- Patola Elementary School
- Sampaloc Elementary School
- Sta. Catalina Primary School
- Sto. Domingo Elementary School
- Talugtug Amazing Grace Learning Center
- Talugtug East Central School
- Talugtug West Central School
- Tandoc Elementary School
- Tibag Elementary School
- Villa Boado Elementary School
- Villa Rosario Elementary School
- Villa Rosenda Elementary School

=== Secondary schools ===
- Cinense Integrated School
- Talugtug National High School
- Talugtug National High School (Annex Saverona)
