= San Leonardo, Nueva Ecija =

Municipality in Nueva Ecija, Philippines

San Leonardo
- Municipality
- Municipality of San Leonardo
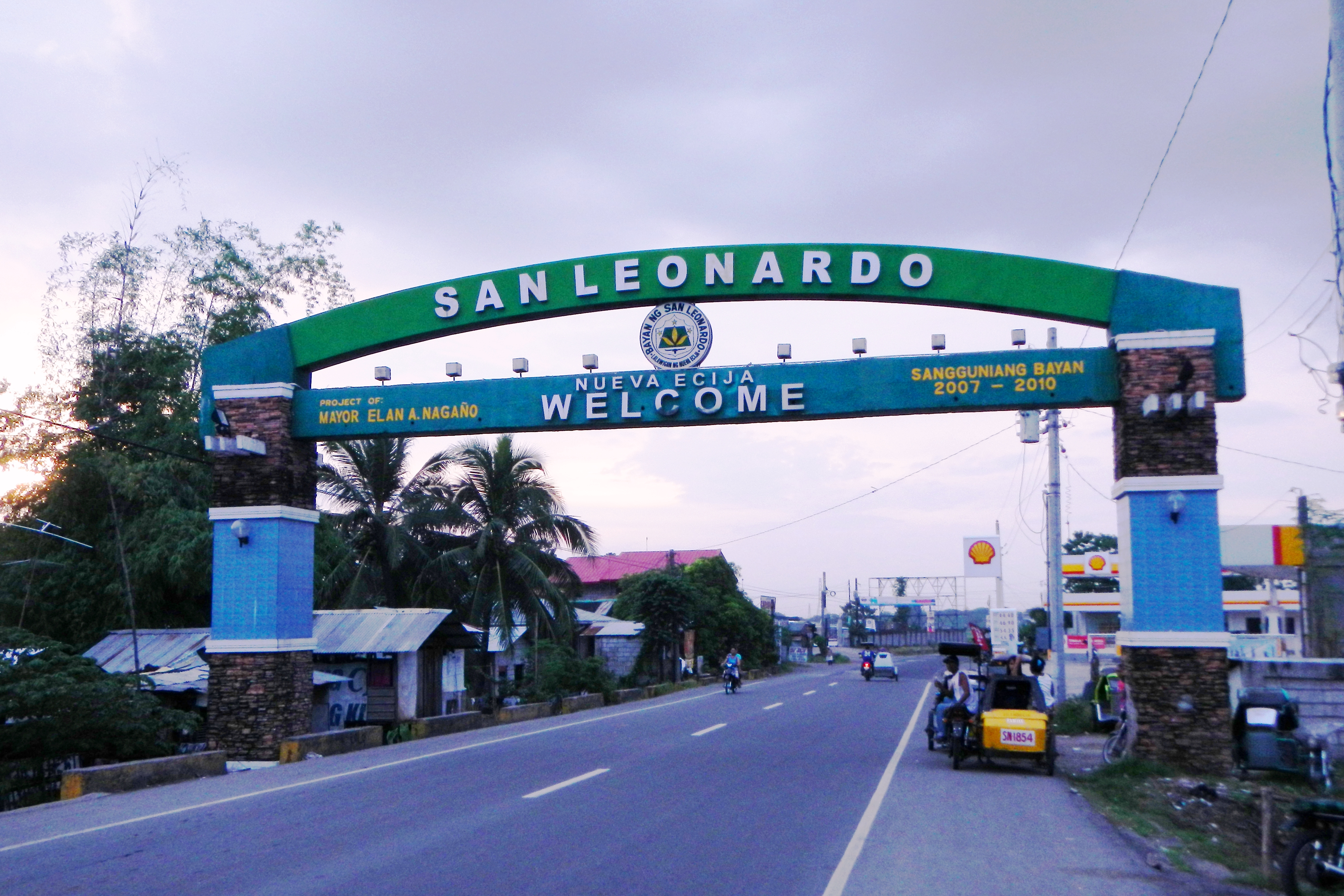
- Welcome arch

- Seal

- Map of Nueva Ecija with San Leonardo highlighted
- Interactive map of San Leonardo
- Location within the Philippines
- Coordinates: 15°21′40″N 120°57′44″E
- Country: Philippines
- Region: Central Luzon
- Province: Nueva Ecija
- District: 4th district
- Barangays: 15 (see Barangays)

Government
  - Type: Sangguniang Bayan
  - Mayor: Nina N. Joson
  - Vice Mayor: Froilan "Elan" A. Nagaño
  - Representative: Emerson D. Pascual
  - Municipal Council: Members: Hernando Tagumpay A. Nagaño Jr.; Jessica Pamela L. Salomon; Rico N. Antonio; Poton Eulinio V. Nagaño; Cesario E. Amurao; Mark B. Antonino; Eriberto R. Fajardo; Francisco A. San Gabriel
  - Electorate: 45,858 voters (2025)

Area
  - Total: 151.90 km^{2} (58.65 sq mi)
- Elevation: 29 m (95 ft)
- Highest elevation: 51 m (167 ft)
- Lowest elevation: 18 m (59 ft)

Population (2024 census)
  - Total: 69,180
  - Density: 455.4/km^{2} (1,180/sq mi)
  - Households: 17,243

Economy
  - Income class: 1st municipal income class
  - Poverty incidence: 8.93% (2023)
  - Revenue: ₱ 303.7 million (2024)
  - Assets: ₱ 1,439 million (2024)
  - Expenditure: ₱ 299.7 million (2024)
  - Liabilities: ₱ 555.6 million (2024)

Service provider
  - Electricity: Nueva Ecija 2 Area 2 Electric Cooperative (NEECO 2 A2)
- Time zone: UTC+8 (PST)
- ZIP code: 3102
- PSGC: 0304927000
- IDD : area code: +63 (0)44
- Native languages: Tagalog; Ilocano
- Website: www.sanleonardians.com

San Leonardo, officially the Municipality of San Leonardo (Tagalog: Bayan ng San Leonardo), is a municipality in the province of Nueva Ecija, Philippines. According to the 2024 census, it has a population of 69,180 people.

== History ==
During World War II, Imperial Japanese forces sacked San Leonardo during the opening stages of the Japanese Occupation. Novo Ecijano and Hukbalahap Communist guerrilla resistance groups from 1942 to 1944 in the town fought the invaders, until the town's liberation in 1945.

From January to April 1945, the combined military force of the Philippine Commonwealth Army, Philippine Constabulary, and the United States Army recaptured and liberated the town. The joint forces assisted the Novo Ecijano and Hukbalahap Communist resistance groups in defeating the soldiers and officers of the Imperial Japanese armed forces and the Makapili soldiers. Thus began the Battle of San Leonardo and the Battle of Gapan between the Japanese and the combined American and Philippine Commonwealth troops on January to April 1945.

== Geography ==
The municipality has a land area of 151.90 square kilometers or 58.65 square miles which constitutes 2.67% of Nueva Ecija's total area. This represented 2.97% of the total population of Nueva Ecija province, or 0.55% of the overall population of the Central Luzon region. Based on these figures, the population density is computed at 451 inhabitants per square kilometer or 1,169 inhabitants per square mile.

San Leonardo is located between Gapan and Santa Rosa along the Maharlika Highway. It is 15 kilometres (9.3 mi) from Cabanatuan, 29 kilometres (18 mi) from Palayan, and 101 kilometres (63 mi) from Manila.

=== Barangays ===
San Leonardo is politically subdivided into 15 barangays, as shown below. Each barangay consists of puroks and some have sitios.

- Bonifacio (Población)
- Burgos (Población)
- Castellano
- Diversion
- Magpapalayoc
- Mallorca
- Mambangnan
- Nieves
- Rizal (Población)
- San Anton
- San Bartolomé (Población)
- San Roque
- Tabuating
- Tagumpay
- Tambo-Adorable

=== Climate ===
Climate data for San Leonardo, Nueva Ecija
| Month | Jan | Feb | Mar | Apr | May | Jun | Jul | Aug | Sep | Oct | Nov | Dec | Year |
|---|---|---|---|---|---|---|---|---|---|---|---|---|---|
| Mean daily maximum °C (°F) | 28 (82) | 30 (86) | 31 (88) | 33 (91) | 33 (91) | 31 (88) | 30 (86) | 29 (84) | 29 (84) | 30 (86) | 30 (86) | 29 (84) | 30 (86) |
| Mean daily minimum °C (°F) | 20 (68) | 20 (68) | 20 (68) | 22 (72) | 24 (75) | 24 (75) | 24 (75) | 24 (75) | 24 (75) | 23 (73) | 22 (72) | 21 (70) | 22 (72) |
| Average precipitation mm (inches) | 4 (0.2) | 4 (0.2) | 5 (0.2) | 11 (0.4) | 66 (2.6) | 99 (3.9) | 127 (5.0) | 113 (4.4) | 99 (3.9) | 84 (3.3) | 35 (1.4) | 14 (0.6) | 661 (26.1) |
| Average rainy days | 2.2 | 1.9 | 3.2 | 5.3 | 16.1 | 20.8 | 23.5 | 22.8 | 22.2 | 16.5 | 8.9 | 3.5 | 146.9 |
Source: Meteoblue

== Demographics ==
Population census of San Leonardo

| Year | Pop. | ±% p.a. |
|---|---|---|
| 1903 | 7,082 | — |
| 1918 | 7,059 | −0.02% |
| 1939 | 10,716 | +2.01% |
| 1948 | 15,385 | +4.10% |
| 1960 | 18,635 | +1.61% |
| 1970 | 25,995 | +3.38% |
| 1975 | 29,201 | +2.36% |
| 1980 | 34,706 | +3.51% |

| Year | Pop. | ±% p.a. |
|---|---|---|
| 1990 | 39,740 | +1.36% |
| 1995 | 46,545 | +3.01% |
| 2000 | 50,478 | +1.75% |
| 2007 | 54,596 | +1.09% |
| 2010 | 58,120 | +2.30% |
| 2015 | 65,299 | +2.24% |
| 2020 | 68,536 | +1.02% |
| 2024 | 69,180 | +0.22% |

Source: Philippine Statistics Authority

=== Religion ===
A majority of the populace is Roman Catholic. Other religious groups, mostly Christian, have churches and places of worship in the municipality.

- St. Bartholomew the Apostle Parish Church
- St. John Marie Vianney Parish
- St. Jude Thaddeus of Nueva Ecija
- Ss. Peter and Paul Catholic Chapel - Magpapalayoc
- Bethel United Methodist Church
- Iglesia Ni Cristo - Lokal ng Castellano
- Iglesia Ni Cristo - Lokal ng Nieves
- Iglesia Ni Cristo - Lokal ng San Leonardo
- Iglesia Ni Cristo - Lokal ng Magpapalayok
- Iglesia Ni Cristo - Lokal ng Tabuating
- Iglesia Ni Cristo - Lokal ng Balanga Extension
- Iglesia Ni Cristo - Lokal ng San Anton
- Iglesia Ni Cristo - Lokal ng San Roque
- Jesus Christ to God be the Glory Church International
- Leap of Faith Christian Church
- Pentecostal Missionary Church of Christ (4th Watch)
- United Pentecostal Church - San Leonardo
- Victory Churches of Asia, Incorporated

== Economy ==
Poverty incidence of San Leonardo (%)

Source: Philippine Statistics Authority

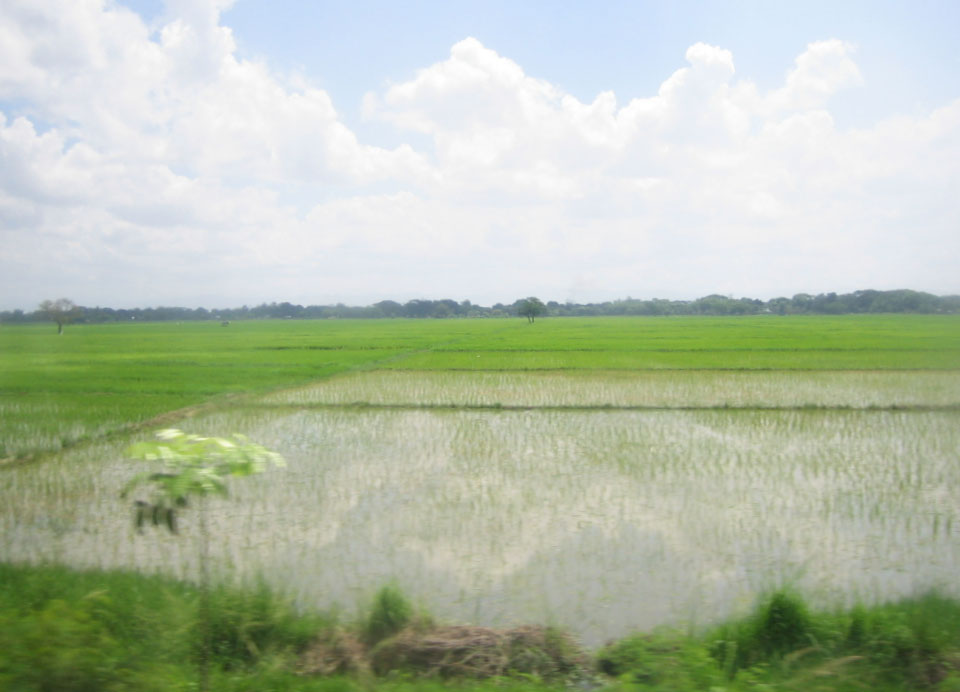
Rice paddies of San Leonardo, Nueva Ecija.

Primarily depends on rice cultivation, vegetable production, poultry, piggery & commercial fishery. The area has a farming economy. San Leonardo has vast rice fields and land for growing vegetables and poultry products.

== Education ==
The San Leonardo Schools District Office governs all educational institutions within the municipality. It oversees the management and operations of all private and public, from primary to secondary schools.

=== Public elementary schools ===
- C.I. Villaroman ES (Formerly Magpapalayok Elementary School)
- Castellano Elementary School
- Clever Lane Montessori School
- Lasaltech Academy
- Mallorca Elementary School
- Mambangnan Elementary School
- Nieves Elementary School
- San Anton Elementary School
- San Leonardo Academy
- San Leonardo Central School
- San Lorenzo Ruiz Diocesan Academy
- San Roque Elementary School
- Seraphin Learning Center
- Tagumpay Elementary School
- Tambo North Elementary School
- Tambo South Elementary School
- Trinity Christian School

=== Secondary schools ===
- Magpapalayok National High School
- Mallorca National High School
- Mambangnan National High School
- San Anton National High School
- San Leonardo National High School
- Tagumpay Nagaño High School
- Tagumpay Integrated School

=== Higher educational institutions ===
- Colegio de San Leonardo
- Dr. Gloria D. Lacson Foundation Colleges
- Nueva Ecija University of Science and Technology - San Leonardo Campus
- Synergy Institute of Business and Management Inc.

== Healthcare ==
Hospitals and clinics can be found for their check up and treatment.

- Dr. Gloria D. Lacson General Hospital
- Nueva Ecija Medical Center
- South Ecija Doctors Hospital

== Notable personality ==
- Bea Binene - actress

== Gallery ==
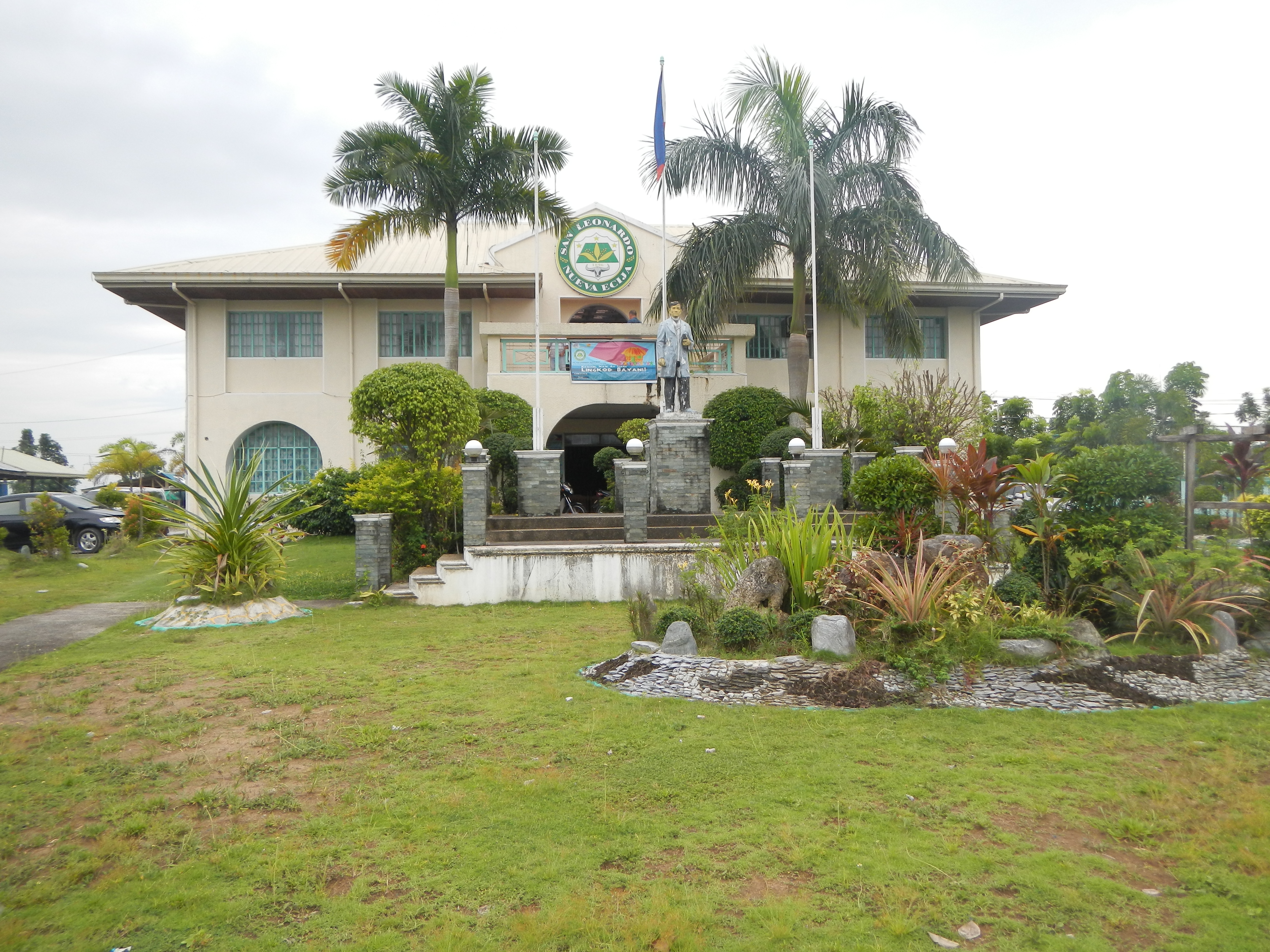
Town hall

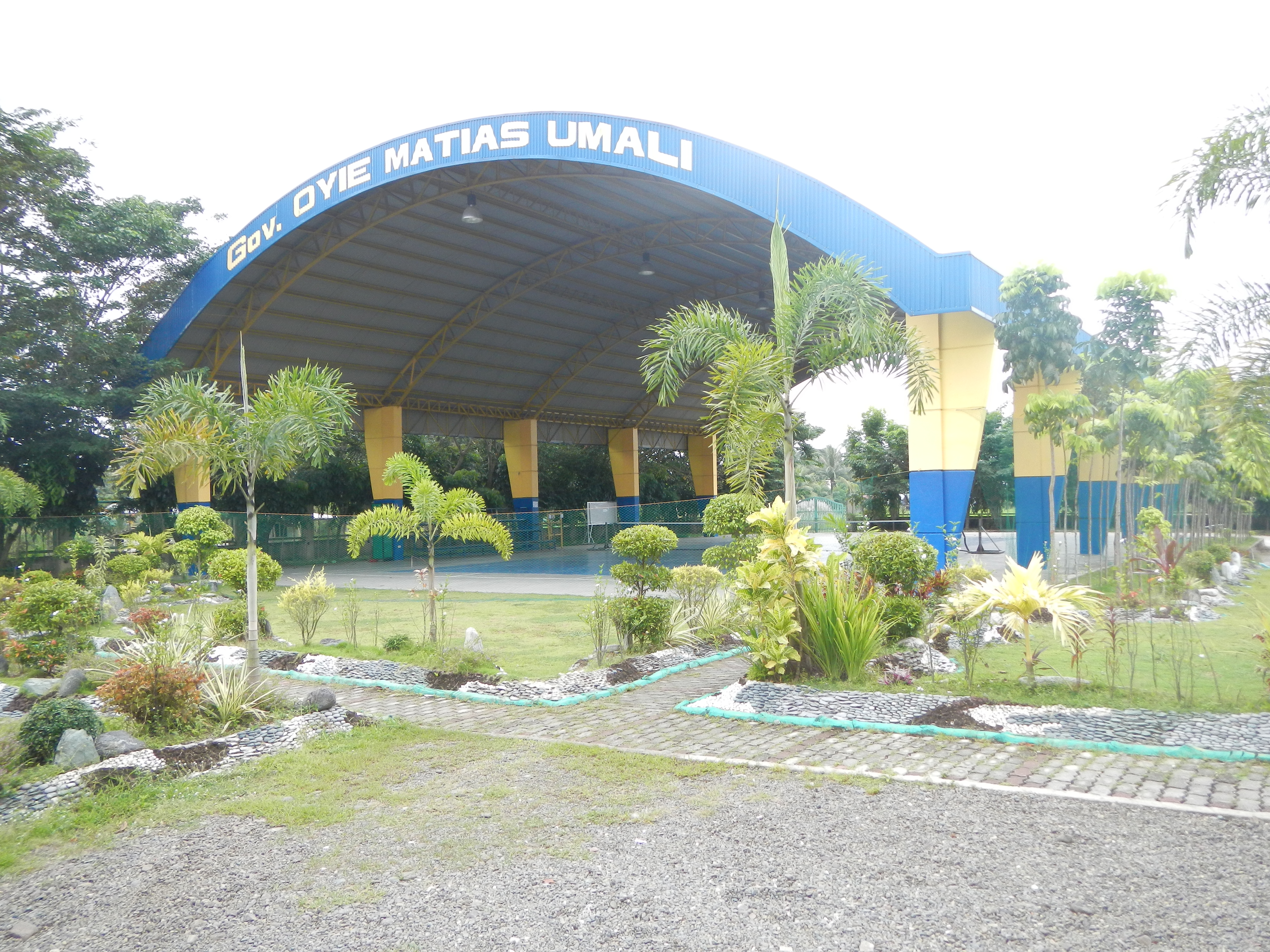
Municipal covered courts

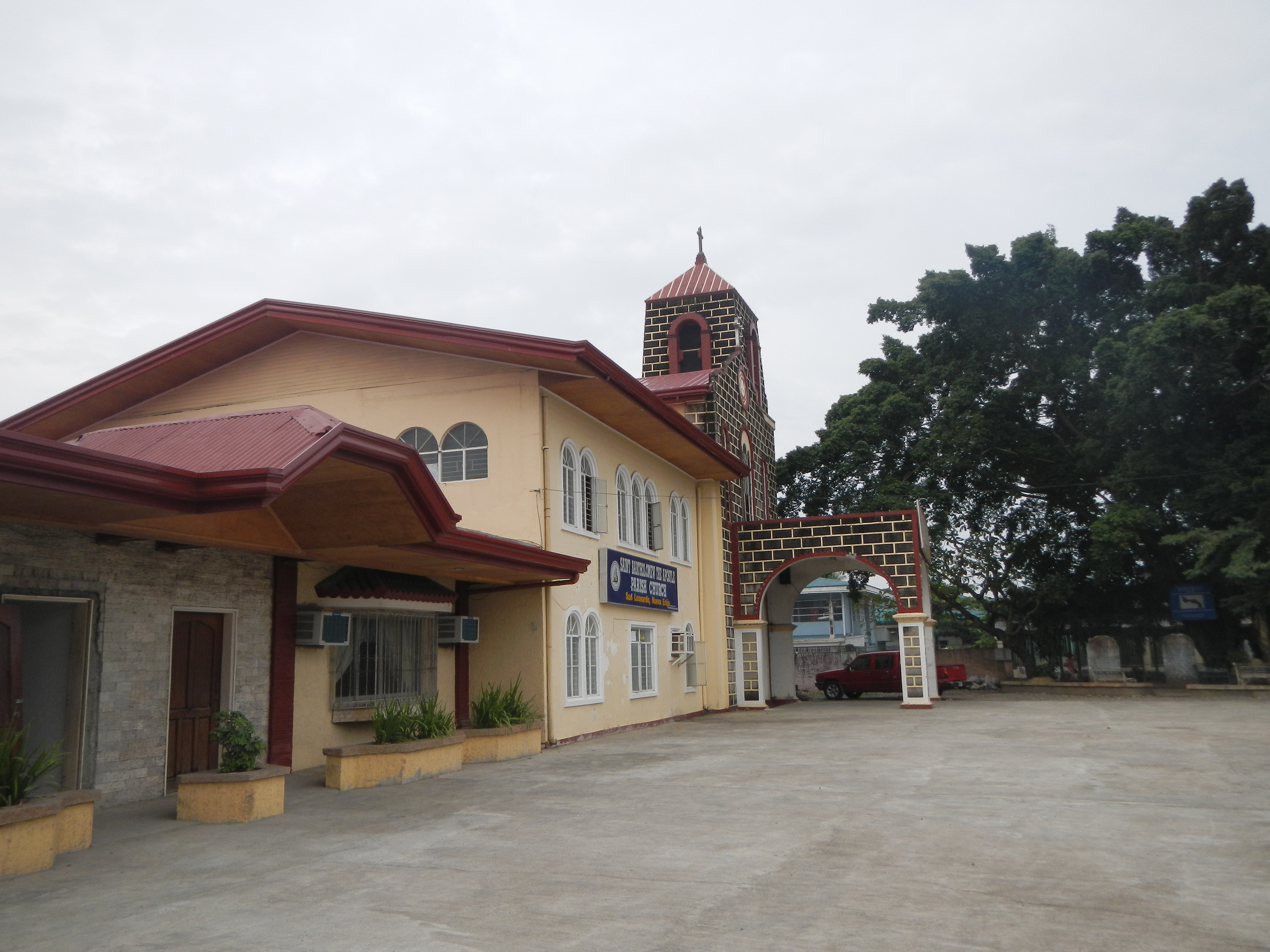
St. Bartholomew the Apostle Church

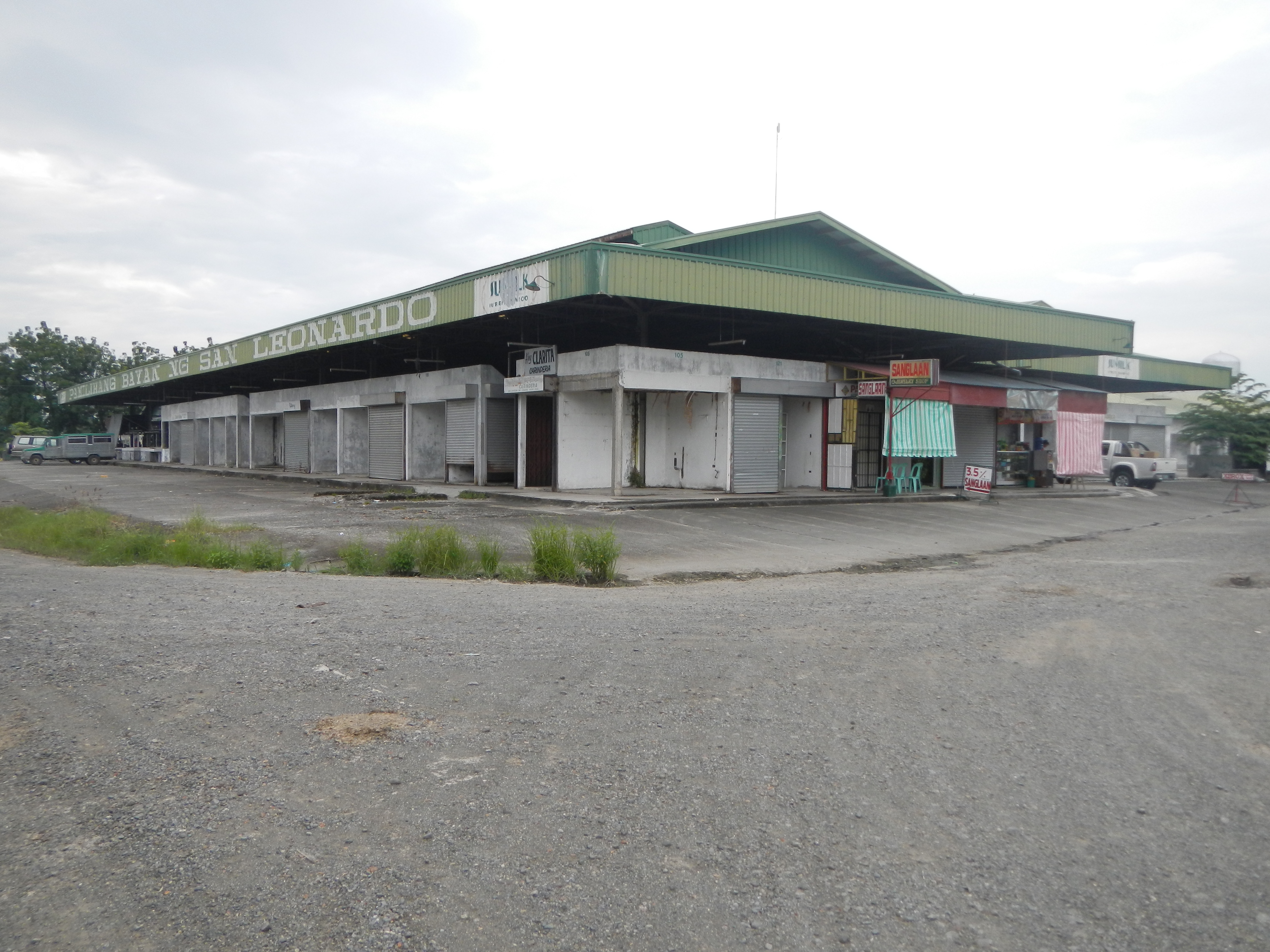
Public market

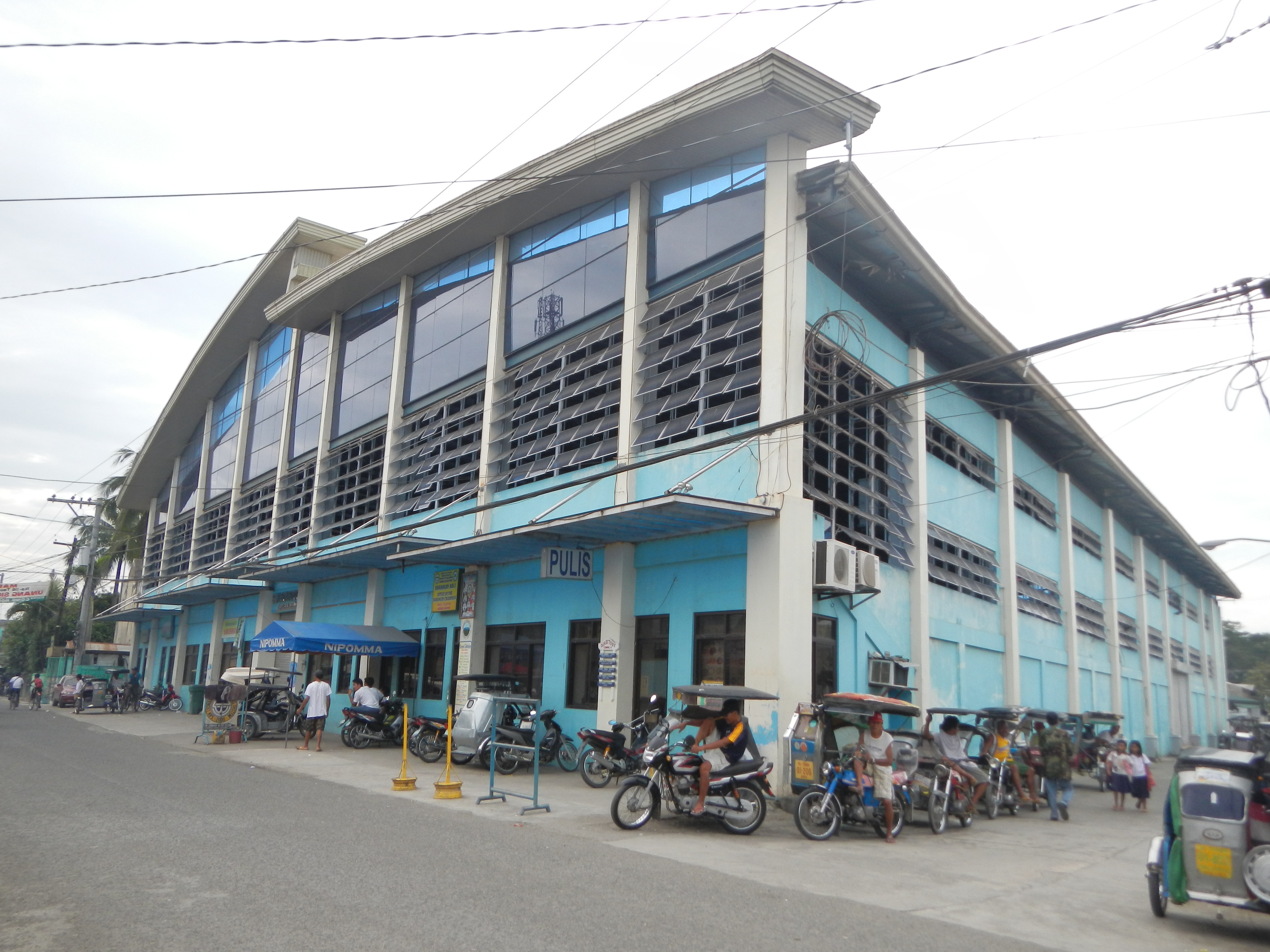
Biggest gymnasium in Nueva Ecija
