= Kokoy Salvador =

Filipino politician and businessman (born 1967)

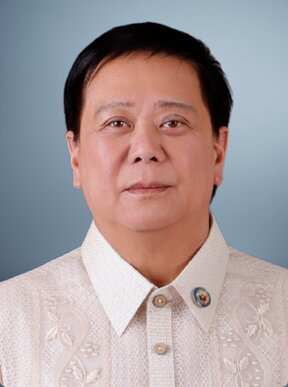
- Official portrait, 2025

Member of the House of Representatives from Nueva Ecija’s 2nd district
- Incumbent
- Assumed office June 30, 2025
- Preceded by: Joseph Gilbert Violago

Mayor of San Jose, Nueva Ecija
- In office June 30, 2016 – June 30, 2025
- Vice Mayor: Glenda Felimon (2016–2022); Ali Salvador (2022–2025)
- Preceded by: Marivic Violago-Belena
- Succeeded by: Josel Violago

Vice Mayor of San Jose, Nueva Ecija
- In office June 30, 2007 – June 30, 2010
- Mayor: Marivic Violago-Belena
- Preceded by: Lamberto Salvador
- Succeeded by: Jose Felimon

Member of San Jose City Council
- In office June 30, 2004 – June 30, 2007

Personal details
- Born: Mario Ong Salvador; April 1, 1967 (age 59)
- Party: PFP (2018–present); Unang Sigaw (local party; 2021–present)
- Other political affiliations: NPC (2012–2018); BALANE (2009–2015); Lakas (2004–2009)
- Occupation: Politician, businessman

Mario "Kokoy" Ong Salvador (born April 1, 1967) is a Filipino politician and businessman. He is currently representing the 2nd District of Nueva Ecija in the House of Representatives of the Philippines since 2025. He served as Mayor of San Jose, Nueva Ecija from 2016 to 2025. He also served as Vice Mayor of San Jose, Nueva Ecija from 2007 to 2010.

== Political career ==
=== Barangay politics ===
In 1989, Salvador started politics when he was a barangay councilor. He also served as barangay captain.

=== City Councilor (2004–2007) ===
Salvador became a city councilor in San Jose, Nueva Ecija from 2004 to 2007.

=== Vice Mayor of San Jose City (2007–2010) ===
In 2007, Salvador was elected as vice mayor of San Jose, Nueva Ecija until 2010.

=== 2010 San Jose City mayoralty bid ===
In 2010, Salvador ran for mayor of San Jose City but he lost to Marivic Belena.

=== 2013 San Jose City mayoralty bid ===
In 2013, Salvador ran again for mayor of San Jose City but he lost to Marivic Belena for the second time.

=== Mayor of San Jose City (2016–2025) ===
In 2016, Salvador was elected as mayor of San Jose City for where he served for three consecutive terms.

=== House of Representatives (2025–present) ===
In 2025, Salvador was elected as representative the second district of Nueva Ecija.
