= Nueva Ecija =

- Province
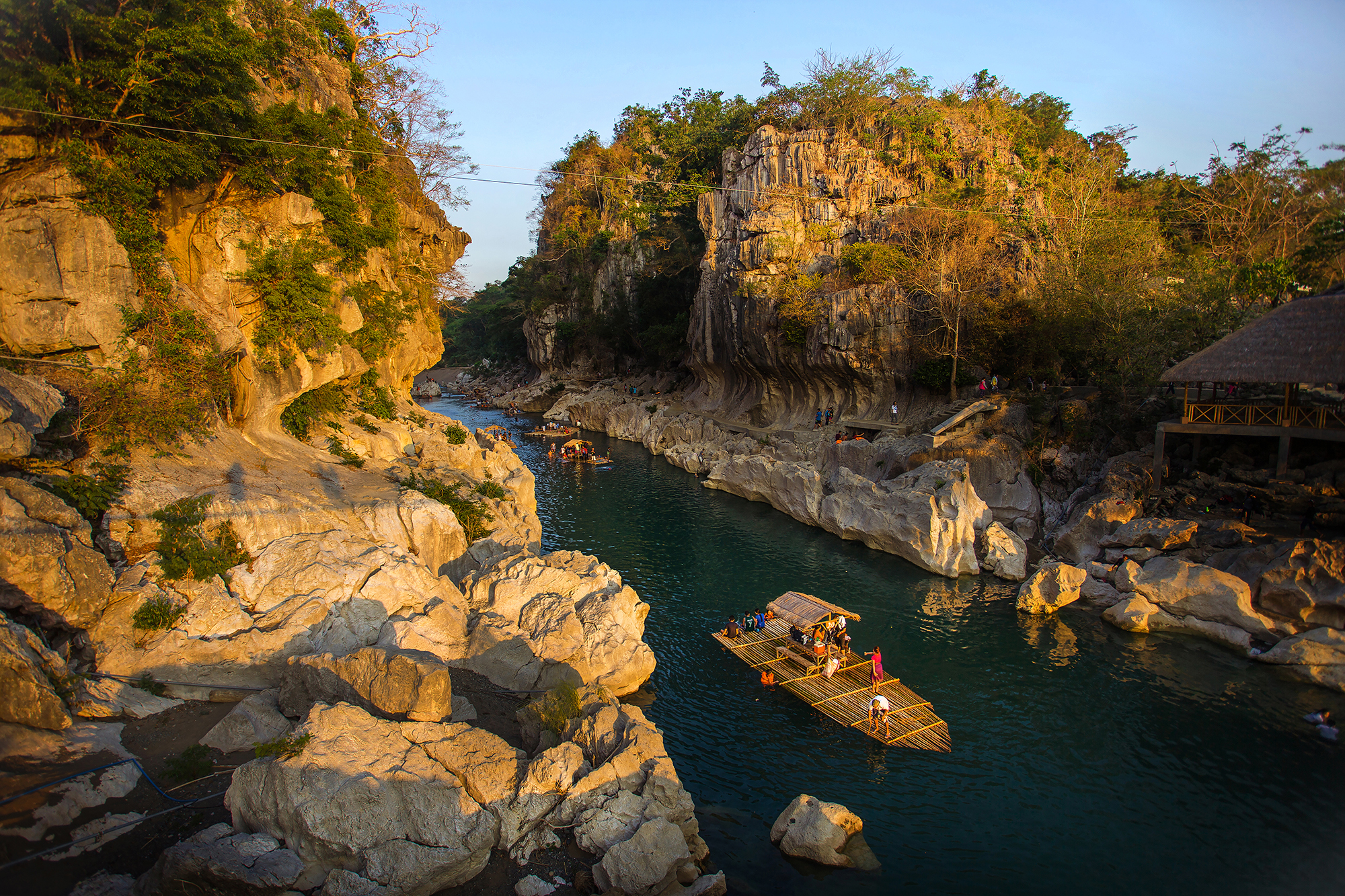
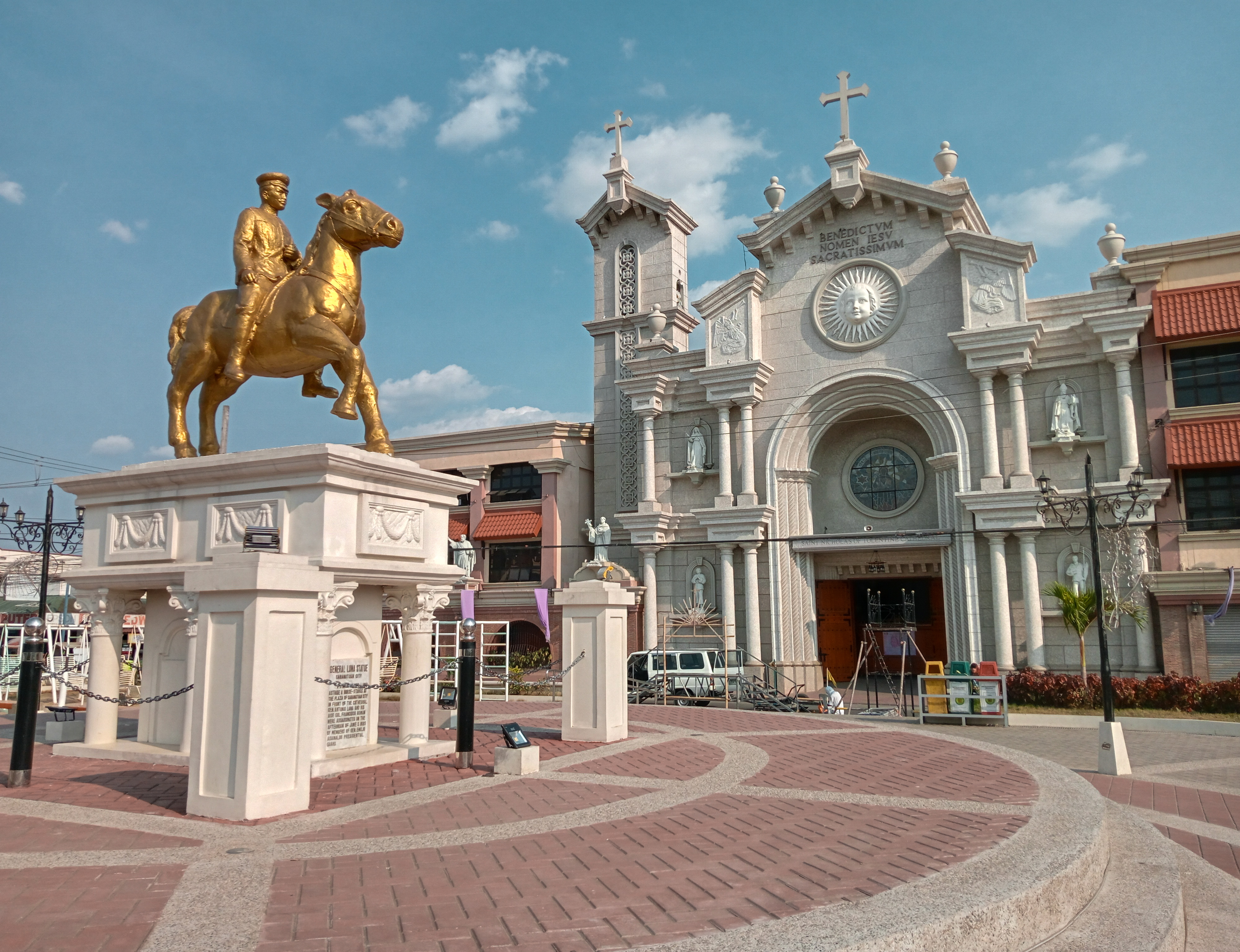
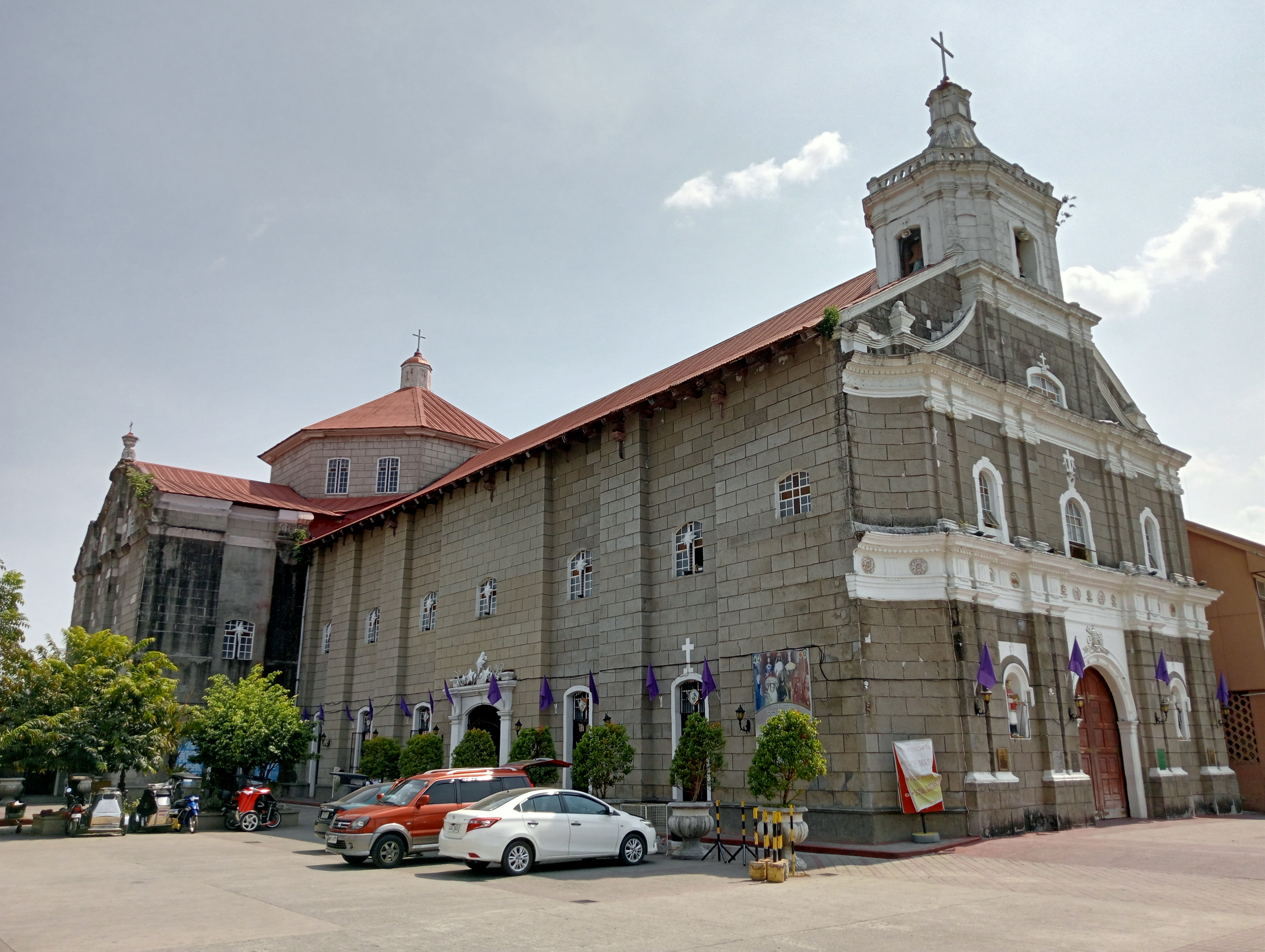
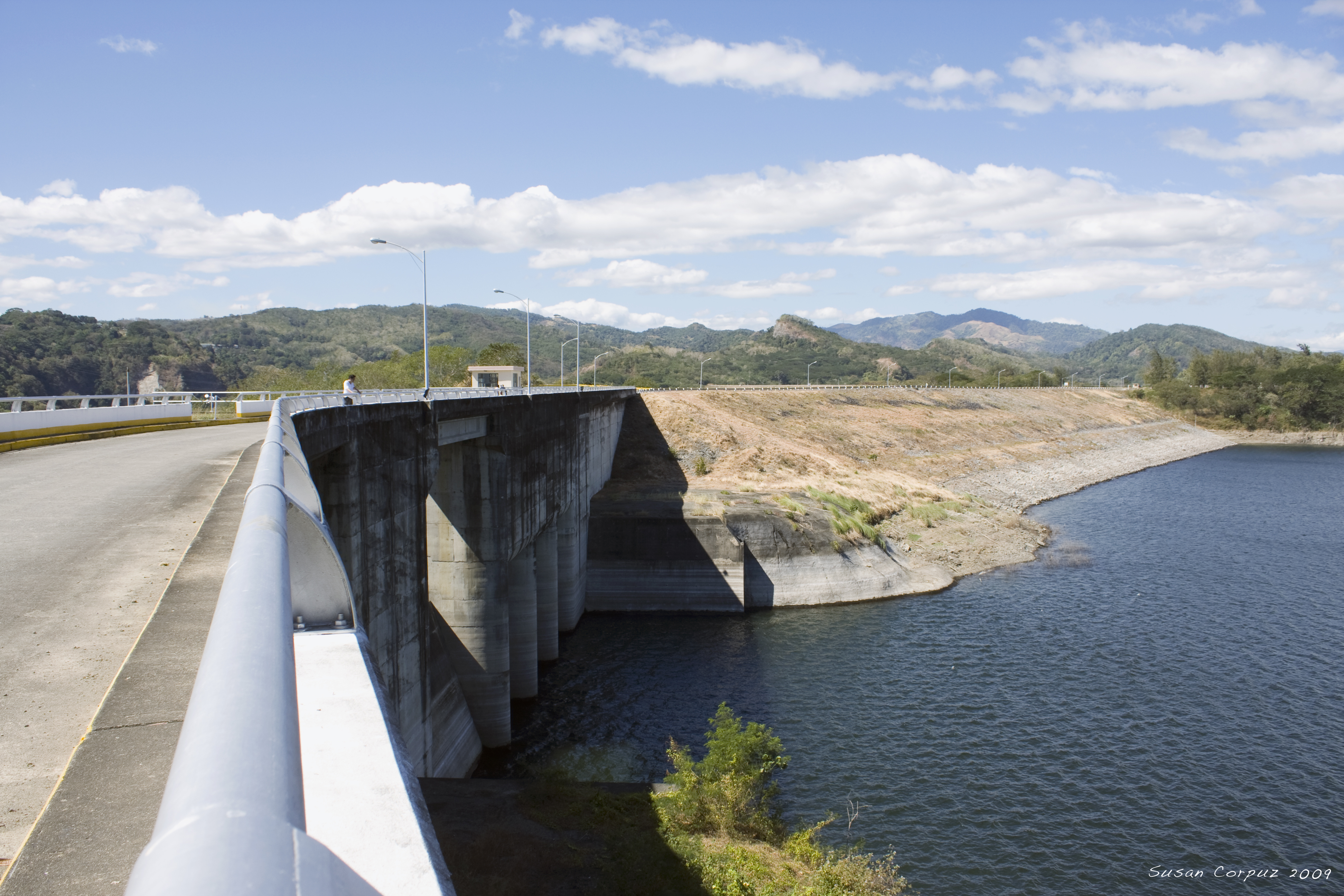
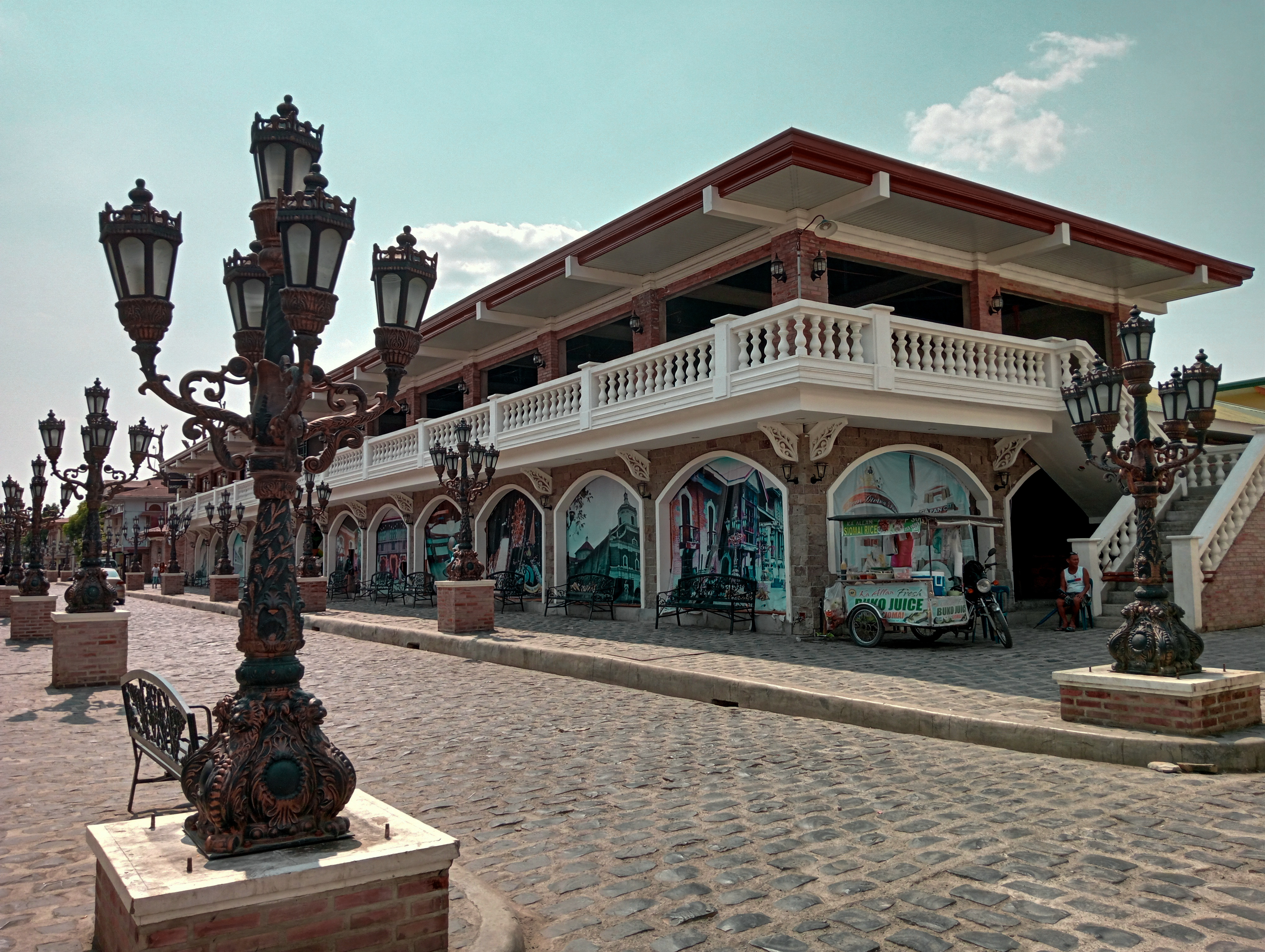
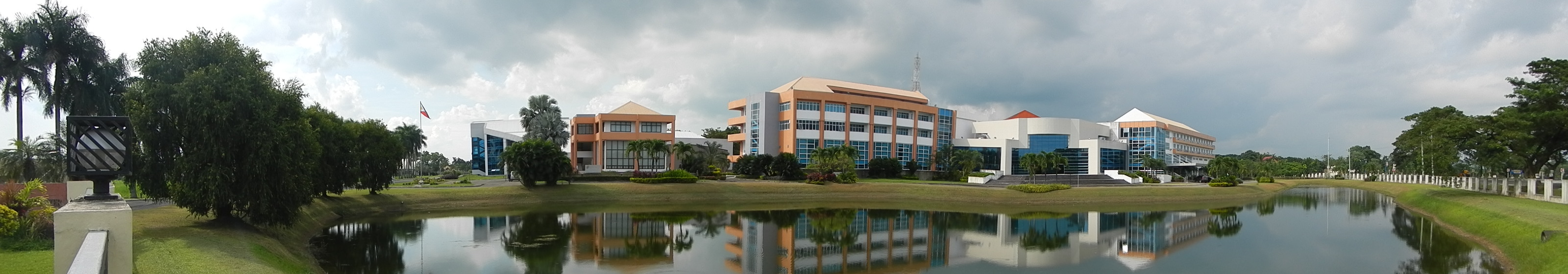
- (from top: left to right) Minalungao National Park, Gen. Antonio Luna Monument in front of Cabanatuan Cathedral, Minor Basilica and National Shrine of La Virgen Divina Pastora, Pantabangan Dam, Lumang Gapan (Little Vigan), and Philippine Carabao Center.

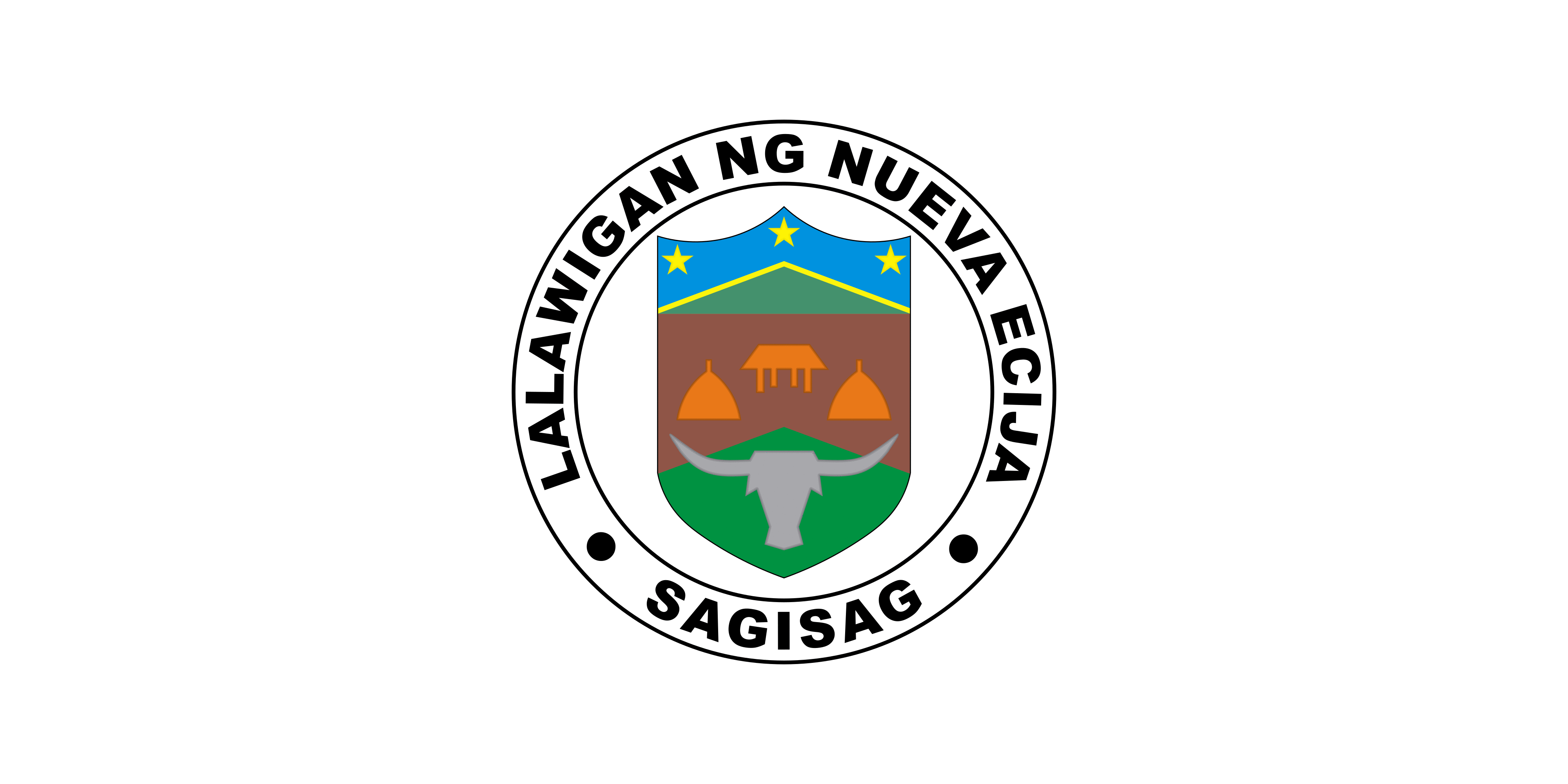
- Flag Seal
- Nicknames: Rice Granary of the Philippines; Milk Capital of the Philippines; Heart of Inland Luzon
- Anthem: Awit ng Nueva Ecija (Song of Nueva Ecija)
- Location in the Philippines
- Interactive map of Nueva Ecija
- Coordinates: 15°35′N 121°00′E
- Country: Philippines
- Region: Central Luzon
- Founded: 25 April 1801
- Named for: Écija, Spain
- Capital: Palayan City
- Largest city: Cabanatuan

Government
  - Type: Sangguniang Panlalawigan
  - Governor: Aurelio Umali (Unang Sigaw)
  - Vice Governor: Gil Raymond Umali (Unang Sigaw)
  - Legislature: Nueva Ecija Provincial Board
  - Electorate: 1,620,166 voters (2025)

Area
  - Total: 5,751.33 km^{2} (2,220.60 sq mi)
  - Rank: 12th out of 82
- Highest elevation (Mount Kiligantian): 1,673 m (5,489 ft)

Population (2024 census)
  - Total: 2,395,816
  - Rank: 10th out of 82
  - Density: 416.567/km^{2} (1,078.90/sq mi)
  - Rank: 16th out of 82
  - Households: 572,583
- Demonyms: Novo Ecijano (m/n); Novo Ecijana (f)

Divisions
  - Independent cities: 0
  - Component cities: 5: Cabanatuan; Gapan; Muñoz; Palayan; San Jose
  - Municipalities: 27: Aliaga; Bongabon; Cabiao; Carranglan; Cuyapo; Gabaldon; General Mamerto Natividad; General Tinio; Guimba; Jaen; Laur; Licab; Llanera; Lupao; Nampicuan; Pantabangan; Peñaranda; Quezon; Rizal; San Antonio; San Isidro; San Leonardo; Santa Rosa; Santo Domingo; Talavera; Talugtug; Zaragoza
  - Barangays: 849
  - Districts: Legislative districts of Nueva Ecija

Economy
  - Income class: 1st provincial income class
  - Poverty incidence: 6.9% (2023)
  - Revenue: ₱ 4,930 million (2024)
  - Assets: ₱ 16,170 million (2024)
  - Expenditure: ₱ 4,567 million (2024)
  - Liabilities: ₱ 5,053 million (2024)
- Time zone: UTC+8 (PHT)
- PSGC: 034900000
- IDD : area code: +63 (0)44
- ISO 3166 code: PH-NUE
- Ethnic groups: Tagalog (77.8%); Ilocano (19.3%); Kapampangan (0.06%); Pangasinan (0.03%)
- Spoken languages: Tagalog; Ilocano; Filipino; English
- Website: www.nuevaecija.ph

Nueva Ecija, officially the Province of Nueva Ecija, is a landlocked province in the Philippines. It is located in the Central Luzon region. Its capital is the city of Palayan. Its former capital is Cabanatuan, Nueva Ecija's largest city and its economic, commercial, and institutional center. Nueva Ecija borders the provinces of Aurora, Bulacan, Nueva Vizcaya, Pampanga, Pangasinan, and Tarlac. It is nationally known as the Rice Granary of the Philippines, as it produces the largest yield of rice in the Philippines.

== History ==
=== Early history ===
Nueva Ecija's first settlers included tribes of Caraclan and Buquid people and Bugkalot (Abaca and Ilongot) people. Settlements were built along the Rio Grande de Pampanga's river banks. The Bugkalot were the fierce headhunters and animist tribes who occupied Carranglan and the mountainous terrain of Sierra Madre and Caraballo Mountains. The head hunting communities were nestled along the riverbanks of Rio Grande's tributaries in the north. Abaca and Italon were subgroups of Bugkalot people, meaning river settlers. Ilongots survived mainly by fishing and hunting. Food production was a secondary occupation. The agriculture-based community of Caraclans and Buquids were settled in Bongabon and Pantabangan along the riverbanks of Rio Grande's tributaries in the northeast.

=== Spanish colonial era ===
==== Conversion to Christianity ====
Consistent with the history of Hispanization in the rest of Philippine archipelago, missions in Nueva Ecija were established by Augustinian missionaries. The first mission was established in Gapan in 1595. The Augustinians abandoned their missionary work in 1636, maintaining only the mission in Bongabon.

At the turn of the 18th century, the missionaries resumed their evangelical work and redirected their efforts to the northeast, towards rough, mountainous terrain inhabited by the Bugkalots.

On September 1, 1759, King Carlos III of Spain issued a Royal Decree that ended the founding missions of Augustinians and transferred all Augustinian responsibilities in the settlements of Nueva Ecija to Franciscan friars. Through tribute collections and polo y servicio or rendering of force labor, the Franciscans constructed churches, convents, parochial schools and tribunals. They also constructed roads and bridges to connect other settlements. In 1781, a simple irrigation system was constructed in Pantabangan. This new farming technology contributed to the promotion of agriculture in the province.

==== New province ====
To make possible the establishments of settlements, military force became necessary to protect the friars and whatever basic settlement structures were beginning to emerge. Thus military outposts were of utmost importance, especially with the friars trying to convert fierce head-hunting tribes with spears and bladed weapons. It was around this time, during the term of Governor General Fausto Cruzat y Gongora (July 25, 1690, to December 8, 1702), that he established the military outpost he named Nueva Ecija after his hometown of Ecija in northern Spain. At this time, however, Nueva Ecija was still part of upper Pampanga.

In 1762, the British occupied Manila, and many Tagalog refugees from Manila and the northern areas of Cavite escaped to Bulacan and Nueva Ecija, where the original Kapampangan settlers welcomed them. Nueva Ecija, along with Bulacan, was natively Kapampangan when Spaniards arrived. The majority of Kapampangans sold their lands to the newly arrived Tagalog settlers and others intermarried with and assimilated to the Tagalog, which made the province predominantly Tagalog.

Since then, the province has undergone numerous changes in territorial composition. The progressive towns of Gapan, San Isidro, San Antonio, Cabiao and Aliaga were all annexed to Nueva Ecija from Pampanga, resulting in an economic as well as population boom for inhabitants. While Nueva Ecija only had a population of 9,165 in 1845, the annexation of new territories three years later elevated the population to 69,135. In 1818, Nueva Ecija annexed the towns of Palanan from Isabela, as well as Baler, Casiguran, Infanta (formerly called Binangonan de Lampon) and Polillo Islands from Tayabas.

Other changes occurred in the following years until, in 1901, Nueva Ecija's northern municipalities of Balungao, Rosales, San Quintin and Umingan were annexed to Pangasinan. Nueva Ecija's shifting political boundaries in fact necessitated transferring its provincial capital four times. Still, these changes proved ultimately beneficial to Nueva Ecija, as they resulted in a territory with rich land resources nourished by an excellent river system composed of the Pampanga, Talavera and Penaranda rivers. This would help lay the foundation for Nueva Ecija's abundant agricultural economy starting with the American Occupation in the early 20th century.

==== Tobacco monopoly ====
Maintaining the Philippines as a colony became a challenge for the Spanish Empire. Expenses incurred in running the colony were usually paid for by a yearly subsidy (called real situado) sent from the Philippines' sister colony in Mexico. This financial support from the Spanish royal court was often insufficient, especially with expenditures in the Philippine colony growing each year.

This prompted the royal fiscal assigned in Manila to devise a plan to allow the colony itself to raise revenues on its own and thus be able to supplement the Spanish subsidy. This royal fiscal was Francisco Leandro de Vianna, who first proposed creating a tobacco monopoly. De Vianna reasoned, tobacco was a product widely consumed throughout the islands, with a market of roughly one million. He projected earnings of as much as P400,000 from the venture. The first time the proposal was made, however, both King Carlos III of Spain and colonial officials didn't give the idea much importance.

All that would change during the term of Governor-General Jose Basco y Vargas. Basco had plans to develop and promote Philippine agriculture, and de Vianna's proposal seemed attractive to him. After studying the proposal, Basco sent his plan to establish a large-scale tobacco production in the colony under complete ownership and management by the colonial government of Spain. What probably perked up the ears of the Spanish king about Basco's plan to make the Philippine colony financially self-sufficient, thus removing a huge financial burden from the Spanish crown. The King of Spain issued a royal decree on February 9, 1780, setting in motion Basco's plan.

Almost two years to the date of that royal decree, Basco ordered local officials and military commanders to prevent unnecessary losses of tobacco revenues. By March 2, 1782, tobacco production was established in Luzon, with La Union, Ilocos, Abra, Cagayan Valley and Nueva Ecija (still part of Pampanga at the time) as the centers for planting, growing, harvesting and processing tobacco.

This made a drastic and extreme change in the lives of all Novo Ecijanos. Where farmland used to bear rice, tobacco was now the only crop allowed to grow. These included the towns of Gapan, San Isidro, Jaen, Cabiao, Cabanatuan, Talavera, Santor and Bongabon. Each farming family was given a quota of tobacco plant to grow.

By 1850 the tobacco monopoly was producing immense financial gain for the colonial government. Some reports at the time pegged the earnings by as much as $500,000. One account in 1866 reported a much higher amount, as earnings rose to $38,418,939 that year.

Novo Ecijanos suffered a lot from the system. Nueva Ecija was more often able to meet production quotas compared to the other districts. Despite this, tobacco policy imposed a lower price on tobacco from areas closer to Manila. That meant that first-class tobacco leaf grown and harvested from Nueva Ecija was priced lower by one dollar, compared to those from Ilocos, La Union and Cagayan Valley.

The tobacco monopoly did not spur Novo Ecijanos to revolt, unlike the Ilocanos who staged an uprising over injustices in the system. Some tobacco growers in Nueva Ecija resorted to smuggling their own harvests in order to get some profit. But getting caught entailed harsher fines and penalties. Even sympathetic local officials had no choice but to enforce the unjust policies under pain of arrest and hard labor, once laxity on their part resulted in low production.

The flourishing tobacco industry coupled with the rich agricultural lands in central and northeastern Nueva Ecija also attracted migrants from neighboring Pampanga, Pangasinan, Ilocos and Tagalog areas. This made Nueva Ecija a melting pot of cultures and influences, the results of which are still evident in present-day Novo Ecijano culture.

As the tobacco monopoly fuelled further unrest, Spain finally abolished the monopoly on December 3, 1882. It was only then that they could all once again grow rice for food.

==== Philippine revolution ====
One distinct feature of the 1896 revolution against Spain in Nueva Ecija was that it was led by the elite, ruling class instead of the masses. Leaders of the revolt in Nueva Ecija were municipal officials and prominent citizens, who refused to collaborate with the Spanish authorities when armed struggle broke out. Despite being in the ruling class and enjoying positions in the colonial government, these prominent Novo Ecijanos proved their patriotism and love for fellow Filipinos. In fact, one of the founding members of the reform movement La Liga Filipina was lawyer and Novo Ecijano Mamerto Natividad. By the time the Katipunan, the revolutionary movement against Spain, was formed, Novo Ecijanos were actively yet secretly joining it. Even local officials in Nueva Ecija secretly allied with the illustrados and farmers in forming the underground revolutionary society.

Once the Spanish authorities learned of the Katipunan's existence, those perceived as sympathizers of the movement, and even those who were falsely accused of being members of it, were arrested. Mamerto Natividad was among those arrested for sedition, tortured and killed by guardia civil. He was one of the first Novo Ecijano martyrs for freedom. His death, however, would result in bigger problems for the Spanish authorities.

Mamerto Natividad's two sons, Mamerto Jr. and Benito Natividad, later joined the Katipunan. The Spaniards burned their house and sugar mills in Jaen. Mamerto Jr. was later jailed for shooting a Spanish judge who had slapped his younger brother. As the Revolution gained ground, Mamerto Jr. was released and he was able to join the revolutionary army of General Emilio Aguinaldo in Cavite. By August 30, 1896, a state of war was declared by the Spanish colonial government in several Luzon provinces including Nueva Ecija, Bulacan, Pampanga, Tarlac, Batangas, Laguna, Cavite and Manila.

Novo Ecijanos immediately proved themselves worthy of the fight for freedom. On September 2, 1896, Novo Ecijanos led by Gen. Mariano Llanera, capital municipal of Cabiao and Gen. Pantaleon Valmonte, capitan municipal of Gapan attacked San Isidro, the provincial capital. Their 3,000-strong army attacked San Isidro in distinct Novo Ecijano fashion: accompanied by music played by the Banda de Cabiao or Cabiao band.

Novo Ecijanos like Llanera, Valmonte, Mamerto Natividad Jr. and Manuel Tinio conducted themselves heroically during the revolution. They were allied with Aguinaldo's Magdalo group. Aguinaldo was in fact so impressed, he appointed Natividad and Llanera to the two highest-ranking posts in the revolutionary army. Natividad became General Mamerto Natividad, commanding general of the revolutionary army, while General Llanera was vice-commander with the rank of Lieutenant-General. General Natividad proved himself worthy of the position by scoring victories against the Spanish in Tayug, Pangasinan and San Rafael, Bulacan.

On November 11, 1897, Natividad was killed in action in Cabiao, Nueva Ecija. His death precipitated the Pact of Biak-na-Bato, a peace treaty that sought to end hostilities between Spanish authorities and the Filipino rebels. The treaty provided for a payment of P800,000 to the rebels who would then be exiled to Hong Kong. Five Novo Ecijanos would accompany Aguinaldo's exile. They were General Mariano Llanera, Benito Natividad, General Manuel Tinio, and Joaquin Natividad.

Later on, Novo Ecijanos would continue to participate in the drama of war, revolution and the fight for freedom. They would fight when the revolt against Spain continued after the peace treaty broke down and the United States, after declaring war on Spain, promised to help Filipinos fight for freedom. Then, Novo Ecijanos again joined General Emilio Aguinaldo in the Philippine–American War (after it became evident the United States wanted to make the Philippines their own colony).

===== Cry of Nueva Ecija =====
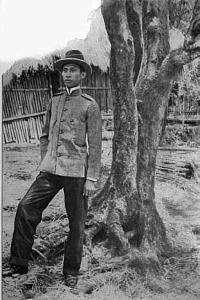
General Manuel Tinio, former governor of Nueva Ecija

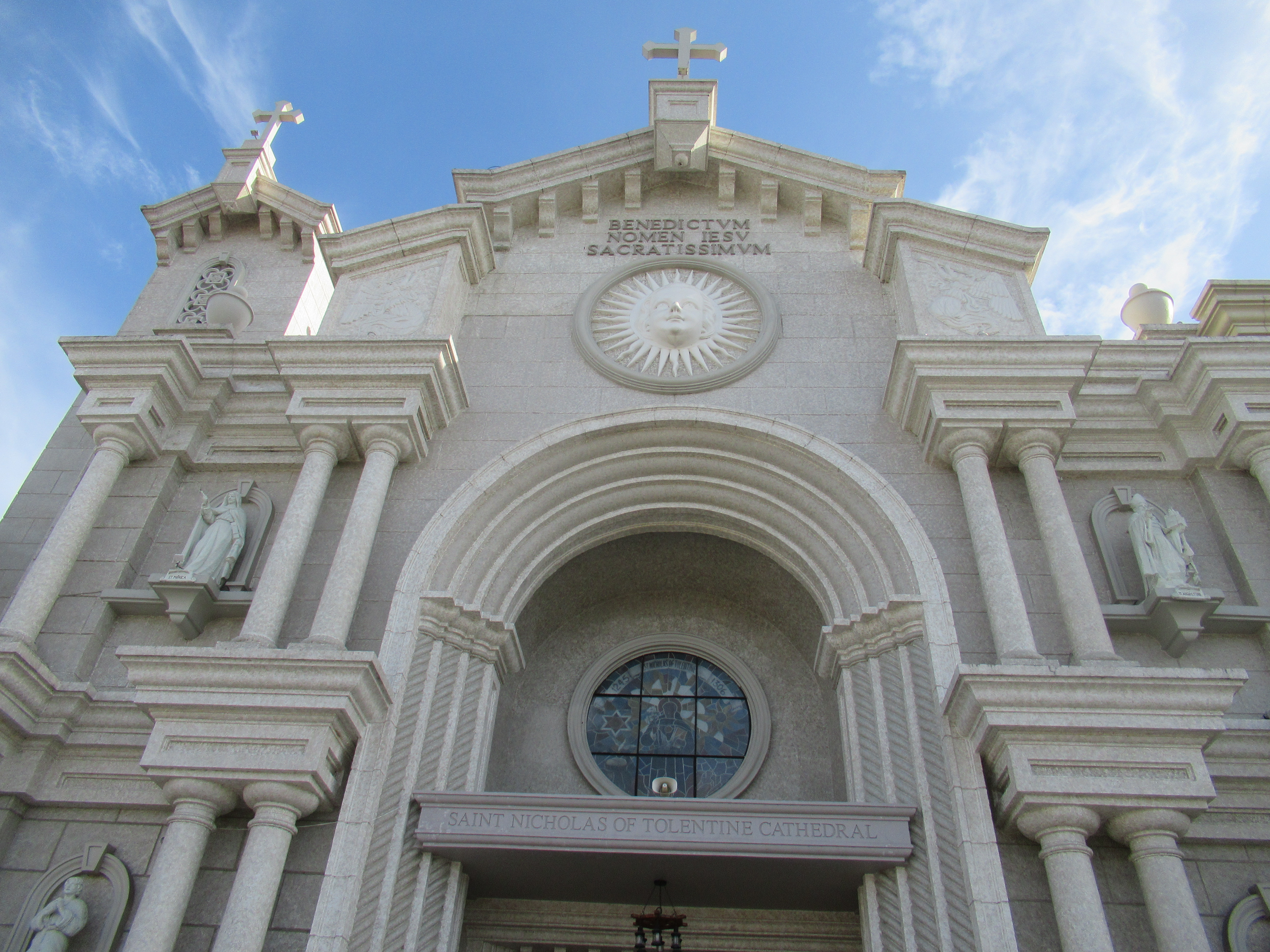
The Cabanatuan Cathedral, which supported the Philippine Revolution and became a headquarters of the First Philippine Republic in the province.

The "Cry of Nueva Ecija" is the 1896 revolutionary battle led by General Mariano Llanera, manned and assisted by General Manuel Tinio and Pantaleon Valmonte of Gapan, Nueva Ecija and Colonel Alipio Tecson of Cabiao, Nueva Ecija who later on became Brigadaire General. The battle was fought in Cabiao, Nueva Ecija. Alipio Tecson would eventually become Gobernadorcillo of Cabiao, Nueva Ecija.

=== American colonial era ===
Commercial, interprovincial trade was carried out using the Rio Grande de Pampanga as main waterway, with trade outposts in San Isidro and Talipapa. Traders from Bulacan, Tondo and Manila regularly came to Nueva Ecija to carry back rice, palay, tobacco, sugar, corn and livestock.

Americans, however, wanted to shift from water-borne trade to a land-based trade system. Their idea for establishing this depended on something they were masters at: building railways. The American colonial government thought a railway could help boost Nueva Ecija's economic growth, in the same way that the US railway system helped unite and develop the economy of the North American continent. What made the railway project attractive was that it was less expensive than building roads. At first run by a private company, the US colonial government took over the ownership and management of the railway system by 1917.

The Americans were soon proven right: trade conducted through the railways boosted Nueva Ecija's income by 25% while transport costs went down by 25% to as much as 75%. With the train able to transport more goods and more people at a cheaper rate, the railway helped spark a rice boom in Gapan, San Isidro, Cabanatuan, Santa Rosa and Penaranda. Farmers could devote more land to growing rice and even secondary crops like onions and watermelons. More rice mills, farmers and farmer settlers came to Nueva Ecija. By 1936, there were 42 rice mills in Nueva Ecija, owned mostly by Chinese.

The agriculture-based economic boom brought about by the train's huge load capacity and greater speed (compared to boats) encouraged waves of migrations to Nueva Ecija from places like Ilocos, Pampanga, Pangasinan, Tarlac and Bulacan.

The railway brought other changes to Nueva Ecija. While trade was still being done by waterways, settlements by necessity had to be established close to the rivers, where people's basic necessities came from. When the trains became the main mode of transporting goods and people, and with the influx of migrants, it became not only possible but crucial to build more communities further inland. This meant roads and irrigation systems were needed.

As communities expanded inward, first along the rivers and then along the railways, the need for roads and irrigation systems leading to communities in the plains became more urgent. These made it possible for the more remote towns—those farther away from both rivers and railroads—to grow crops and participate in trade, ending what was until then a very slow pace of economic development. By 1912 Governor Benito Natividad had appropriated funds to fast-track the building of roads and bridges linking these remote towns and municipalities to then provincial capital Cabanatuan.

The American government also constructed three major irrigation facilities: the Talavera Irrigation System in 1924, the Penaranda River Irrigation System in 1930 and the Pampanga River Irrigation System in 1939.

By the time these irrigation systems went in full swing, combined with the railway system and the many rice mills, Nueva Ecija had been established as the "Rice Granary of the Philippines". From 1930 to 1939, rice production in Nueva Ecija was averaging more than 9 million cavans of rice.

Under the American regime's homesteading system, an individual could get up to 16 hectares of land, while a corporation could get as much as 1,024 hectares. This did not result in a wide settlement of lands throughout the country, however. Nueva Ecija was one exception, as more settlers opted to homestead its lands. A 1928 Statistical Bulletin records nearly 70,000 hectares were given to more than five thousand homestead applicants.

==== Civil government in the American period ====
The second Philippine Commission went to what was then Nueva's provincial capital, San Isidro, on June 8, 1901, to begin proceedings for establishing the local and provincial governments. 16 out of Nueva Ecija's 19 towns were represented in the meeting. Elections of various representatives from the different towns were carried out successfully.

However, there was still the problem of deciding whether or not to move the provincial capital. The dilemma was caused by events related to the Philippine–American War. First, Nueva Ecija had been a hotbed of resistance against the American Occupation, and was therefore in a state of siege. Four of its towns, Balungao, Rosales, San Quintin and Umingan, which were further away from the capital and already considered pacified by US forces, had been annexed to the province of Pangasinan. In 1902, the District of El Príncipe (composed only of Baler and Casiguran at that time, and now also composed of Dinalungan, Dingalan, Dipaculao, Maria Aurora, and San Luis) was separated from Nueva Ecija and annexed to Tayabas (now Quezon), which then became part of Aurora.

The newly elected Nueva Ecija representatives were of the view that since a civil government under the Americans was already being established, it was time to return the four towns to Nueva Ecija. This would benefit the province as the four town were rich in natural resources. The fact that the towns were quite far from the capital, one of the representatives suggested, was no obstacle: the provincial capital could simply be moved to Cabanatuan. Other representatives objected to this proposal, pointing out that Cabanatuan had no infrastructure wherein to house the provincial government. The matter was not resolved until two years later, when the US governor-general signed Act No. 1748, ordering the transfer of the capital to Cabanatuan by 1912.

The civil provincial government of Nueva Ecija was formally established by the Taft Commission on June 11, 1901. The very first governor under this new system was Epifanio de los Santos.

==== Education during the American period ====
A report of the United States' Philippine Commission in 1900 showed only 10 out of 23 municipalities in Nueva Ecija had a public school established during the Spanish times and according to the Philippine Commission figures by 1902, 37 public primary schools were established, and 63 Novo Ecijano teachers supported by 16 American Thomasites, part of the larger group of some 500 pioneer American teachers who arrived aboard the USAT Thomas in September 1901, to help establish an American public school system in the Philippines. The Education Act No. 74 approved by the Philippine Commission in 1901 proved to be the catalyst that made Novo Ecijanos rally behind the local and American teachers to make sure as many children as possible benefitted from the public school system.

People contributed in the form of cash, construction materials or labor, and even vacant lots for the building of schools. Community support for the building of schools was such that by 1906, there were already 99 schools in Nueva Ecija. The public school system was still hampered by problems. Relying only on local support, Nueva Ecija (and other places in the Philippines as well) could simply not meet the increasing needs of a growing number of schools, teachers and students. Given the high premium placed by Novo Ecijanos on education, a legislator from Nueva Ecija took the crucial step to compel the American colonial government to allot funding for public education via a legislative act.

Assemblyman Isauro Gabaldon of Nueva Ecija filed an education bill before the 1907 Philippine Assembly, which would later be approved and known as the Gabaldon Education Act. The bill required government to earmark P1,000,000 for public schools throughout the Philippine islands.

Nueva Ecija benefitted tremendously from the new education law. By 1908 Nueva Ecija had 144 primary schools, 11 non-sectarian private schools, 18 sectarian private schools, nine intermediate schools, one vocational school and one agricultural school, the Central Luzon Agricultural School, which is currently now operating as Central Luzon State University.

=== Japanese occupation ===
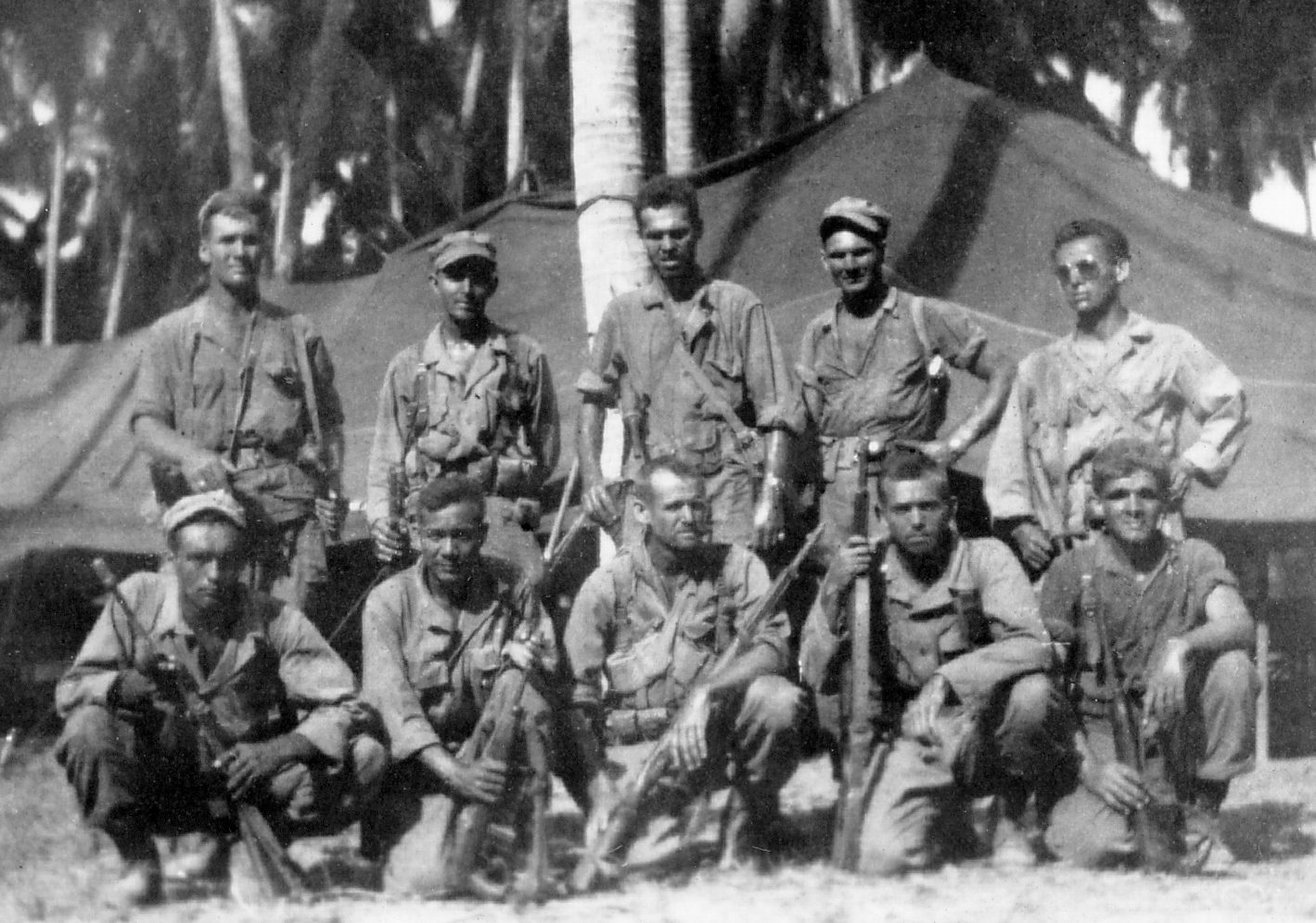
Alamo Scouts in the Raid at Cabanatuan

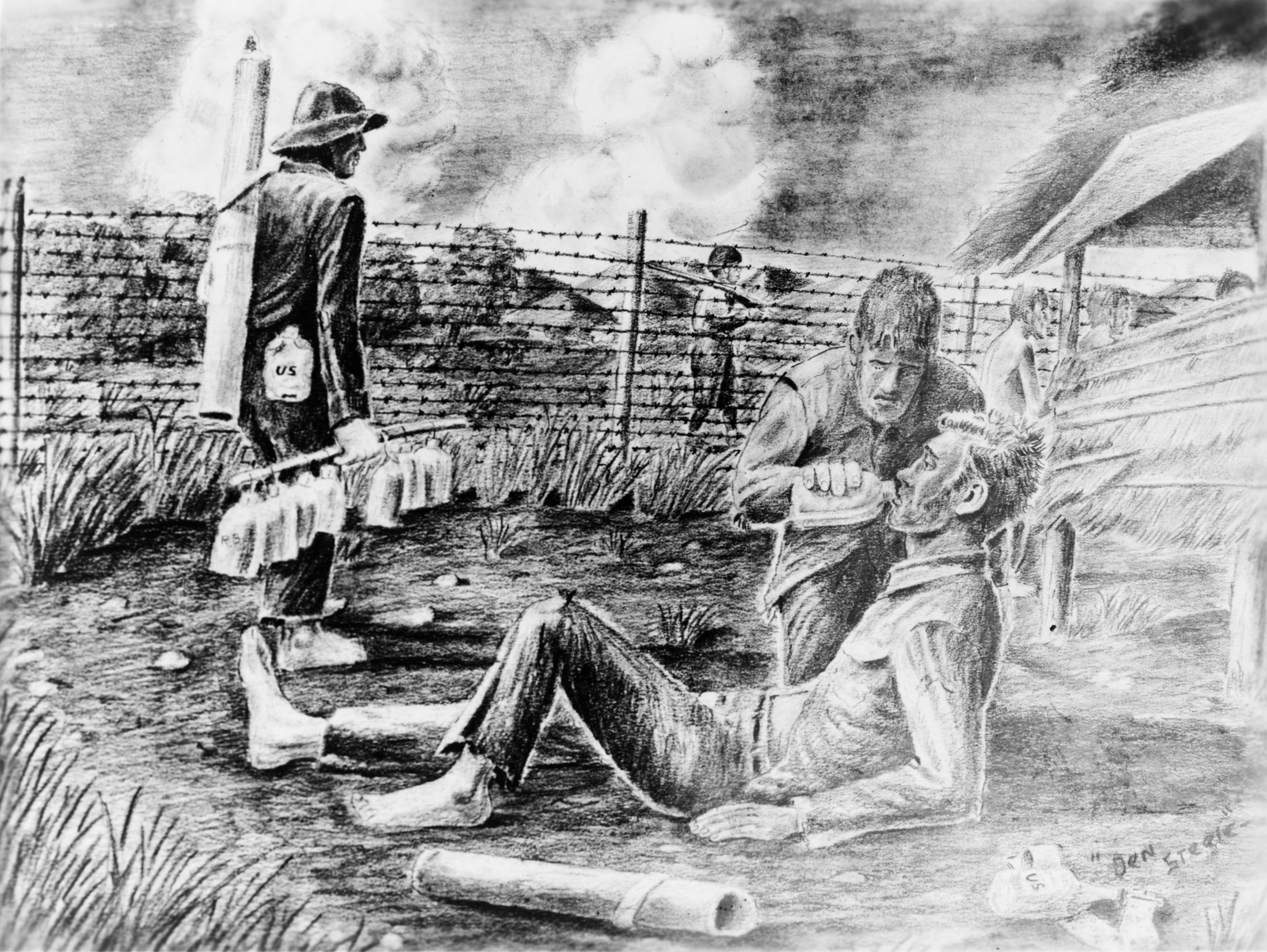
1946 sketch of an American prisoner of war giving another soldier a drink at the Cabanatuan prison camp

During World War II the Imperial Japanese Army entered the province and Nueva Ecija was taken in 1942. On March 29, 1942, under the leadership of Luis Taruc the Hukbalahap was organized in Sitio Bawit, Barrio San Julian in the town of Cabiao. It was perceived to be the military arm of the Partido Komunista ng Pilipinas (Communist Party of the Philippines), that brought about the beginning of the early organized resistance of the Filipino people.

In 1942, the entire present-day territory of Aurora was re-annexed from Tayabas to Nueva Ecija, and returned to Tayabas in 1945

On January 30, 1945, American Army Rangers, Alamo scouts and Filipino guerrillas liberated Allied prisoners of war in Cabanatuan, successfully rescuing over 516 people. By January 31, 1945, the liberated civilians and prisoners of war reached Talavera.

=== Post-independence era ===
After the war, much rebuilding was made at the urban areas of the province, specifically Cabanatuan and Gapan. This became the focus of the administrations of Quezon, Roxas, Quirino, Magsaysay, Garcia, and Macapagal.

In the rural areas of Nueva Ecija, however, economic inequality and environmentally unsustainable farming practices dating back to the 1930s led to a postwar rise of agrarian unrest, peaking around the years from 1948 to 1952.

In 1952 the Magsaysay administration began consultations which led to the setting aside of land on the borders of Laur and Bongabon, where a new planned city would be established to replace Cabanatuan as the provincial capital. Named the city of Palayan, it was formally constituted on June 19, 1965.

=== Martial law era ===
When Ferdinand Marcos was first elected president in 1965, he started planning a series of agricultural modernization programs in Nueva Ecija as part of the effort to centralize political power around the office of the president, rather than local politicians. In May 1969, Congress passed Republic Act No. 5499. which would lead to the creation of Pantabangan Dam, and early pilot testing of what would later become the Masagana 99 programme took place in Nueva Ecija in 1971 and 1972.

The years from 1969 to 1972 were characterized by social unrest, however, as Marcos' campaign spending to win a second term led to an economic crisis in late 1969. This resulted in much of the postwar rebuilding and establishment of new economic centers in Nueva Ecija spiralling down.

Marcos eventually declared of martial law in 1972. Among the first opposition figures to be arrested Philippine Constitutional Convention delegates Romeo Capulong, Ernesto Rondon, Rebeck Espiritu, Juan Liwag, Emmanuel Santos, and Sedfrey Ordoñez - six of Nueva Ecija's seven elected delegates. Fort Magsaysay in Laur became well known as the detention center where the highest profile Political detainees, including Senators Jose W. Diokno and Ninoy Aquino, were kept.

Without anybody able to protest, projects stalled due to earlier unrest pushed through. The Pantabangan Dam finally began construction and was completed in 1974, at the cost of submerging seven villages whose residents were all forcibly moved to locations with less productive riceland. And Masagana 99 achieved initial success but eventually failed due to fertilizer requirements which farmers could not afford.

The latter part of the dictatorship era saw numerous violent incidents such as the January 1982 Talugtug massacre, where commonfolk Ilocanos were gathered and killed by the Marcos-controlled forces; and the February 1982 Gapan massacre, where the Marcos' forces killed-off a whole family, including children.

A drought driven by a severe El Nino incident during the 1982-1983 agricultural season severely hurt rice farmers in Nueva Ecija, rendering them unable to afford the technology package offered under Masagana 99. Similar circumstances throughout the archipelago led to the eventual failure of the program. By 1985, the Marcos administration had shifted away from Masagana 99 towards an economic deregulation strategy which put an emphasis on producing high value crops for export instead of rice.

=== Contemporary History ===
New cities were created in Nueva Ecija after the passage of the Philippine Local Government Code of 1991. November 7, 2000 saw the passage of Republic Act 8977, which elevated the town of Muñoz to the formal title of Science City of Muñoz. And on August 25, 2001, Gapan, which had been the province's oldest municipality, was converted into the City of Gapan, a component city of Nueva Ecija.

== Geography ==
The province is the largest in Central Luzon, covering a total area of 5,751.33 square kilometres (2,220.60 sq mi). Its terrain begins with the southwestern marshes near the Pampanga border. It levels off and then gradually increases in elevation to rolling hills as it approaches the mountains of Sierra Madre in the east, and the Caraballo and Cordillera Central ranges in the north.

Nueva Ecija is bordered on the northeast by Nueva Vizcaya, east by Aurora, south by Bulacan, southwest by Pampanga, west by Tarlac, and northwest by Pangasinan. The province has four distinct districts. The first district (northwest) has a mixture of Ilokano, Pangasinense, and Tagalog, with little Kapampangan cultures. The second district (northeast) is the most complex as it has at least 10 different ethnic groups. The third district (central) has a metropolitan culture, coming from a majority of Tagalog culture, as Cabanatuan is within it. And the fourth district (southwest) has a mixture of Kapampangan and Tagalog cultures.

=== Flora and fauna ===
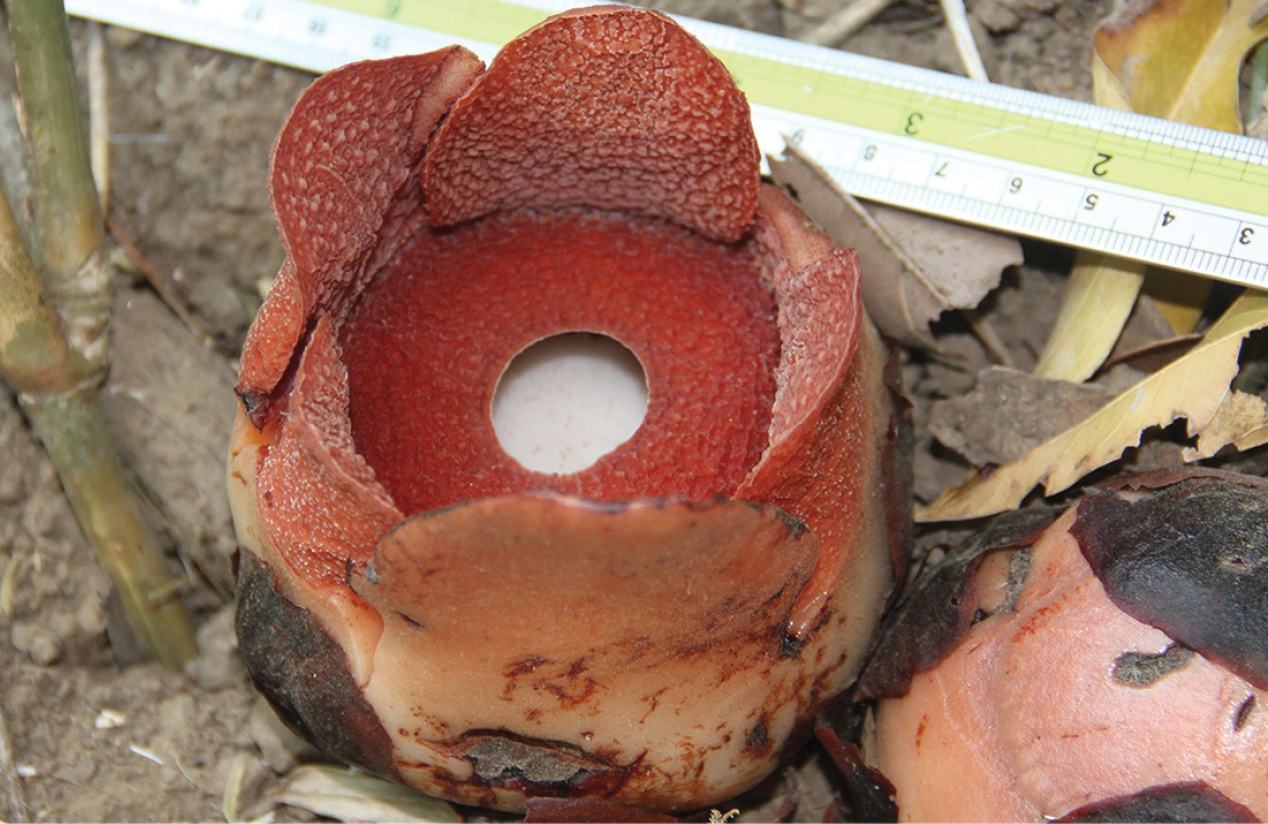
Rafflesia consueloae, smallest raflessia species in the world, is found only in the Pantabangan–Carranglan Watershed Forest Reserve.

The species of flora and fauna in the province is diverse on its north and east borders, which exhibit a shared ecosystem with the Caraballo mountains in the north and the Sierra Madre mountains in the east. The southeast areas are also known for its diverse fauna and flora due to the presence of the Minalungao National Park.

The orchid species Ceratocentron fesselii, which can only be found in the Pantabangan–Carranglan Watershed Forest Reserve in Carranglan, is considered one of the most critically endangered orchid species in the entire Southeast Asian region. It is endangered due to illegal gathering from the wild and due to the illegal black market trade. The forest reserve is also home to the endemic Rafflesia consueloae, which is the smallest rafflesia in the world and is found nowhere else. Philippine deer, Philippine warty pig, and other indigenous mouse species are also present in the province.

In a recent activity, the presence of a Philippine eagle couple was discovered in the Sierra Madre side of Nueva Ecija. The couple are now protected by the local government units in that area. Snakes, lizards, and various amphibian species are also present, especially in wetter months.

=== Administrative divisions ===
Political map of Nueva Ecija

The province is divided into four congressional districts comprising 27 municipalities and five cities. The province has the most cities in the Central Luzon region.

- † Provincial capital and component city
- ∗ Component city
- Municipality

City or municipality^{[A]}		District	Population			±% p.a.	Area		Density		Barangay	Coordinates^{[B]}
			(2020)		(2015)		km^{2}	sq mi	/km^{2}	/sq mi		
Aliaga		1st	3.0%	70,363	63,543	1.96%	90.04	34.76	780	2,000	26	15°30′12″N 120°50′44″E
Bongabon		3rd	2.9%	66,839	64,173	0.78%	242.91	93.79	280	730	28	15°37′56″N 121°08′45″E
Cabanatuan	∗	Lone District	14.2%	327,325	302,231	1.53%	282.75	109.17	1,200	3,100	89	15°29′25″N 120°57′59″E
Cabiao		4th	3.7%	85,862	79,007	1.60%	111.83	43.18	770	2,000	23	15°15′03″N 120°51′27″E
Carranglan		5th	1.8%	42,420	41,131	0.59%	705.31	272.32	60	160	17	15°57′37″N 121°03′50″E
Cuyapo		1st	2.9%	68,066	65,039	0.87%	215.73	83.29	320	830	51	15°46′39″N 120°39′44″E
Gabaldon (Bitulok & Sabani)		3rd	1.7%	38,958	35,383	1.85%	225.28	86.98	170	440	16	15°27′14″N 121°20′14″E
Gapan	∗	4th	5.3%	122,968	110,303	2.09%	164.44	63.49	750	1,900	23	15.3126°N 120.9495°E
General Mamerto Natividad		3rd	1.9%	44,311	41,656	1.18%	118.00	45.56	380	980	20	15°36′09″N 121°03′02″E
General Tinio (Papaya)		4th	2.4%	55,925	47,865	3.01%	533.08	205.82	100	260	13	15°21′00″N 121°02′59″E
Guimba		1st	5.5%	127,653	118,655	1.40%	245.29	94.71	520	1,300	64	15°40′00″N 120°46′00″E
Jaen		4th	3.4%	79,189	73,184	1.51%	85.46	33.00	930	2,400	27	15°20′14″N 120°54′21″E
Laur		3rd	1.7%	38,263	35,656	1.35%	295.88	114.24	130	340	17	15°35′07″N 121°11′00″E
Licab		1st	1.3%	29,269	28,254	0.67%	67.37	26.01	430	1,100	11	15°32′27″N 120°45′46″E
Llanera		5th	1.8%	42,281	39,701	1.21%	114.44	44.19	370	960	22	15°39′45″N 121°01′19″E
Lupao		2nd	2.0%	45,917	43,788	0.91%	121.33	46.85	380	980	24	15°52′26″N 120°53′59″E
Science City of Muñoz	∗	2nd	3.6%	84,308	81,483	0.65%	163.05	62.95	520	1,300	37	15°42′52″N 120°54′15″E
Nampicuan		1st	0.6%	14,471	14,954	−0.62%	52.60	20.31	280	730	21	15°43′56″N 120°38′19″E
Palayan	†	3rd	2.0%	45,383	41,041	1.93%	101.40	39.15	450	1,200	19	15.540679°N 121.082430°E
Pantabangan		5th	1.4%	31,763	29,925	1.14%	392.56	151.57	81	210	14	15°48′26″N 121°08′39″E
Peñaranda		4th	1.4%	32,269	29,882	1.47%	95.00	36.68	340	880	10	15°21′11″N 121°00′09″E
Quezon		1st	1.8%	41,845	40,592	0.58%	68.53	26.46	610	1,600	16	15°33′13″N 120°48′36″E
Rizal		5th	3.0%	70,196	64,087	1.75%	120.55	46.54	580	1,500	26	15°42′31″N 121°06′18″E
San Antonio		4th	3.6%	83,060	77,836	1.24%	153.56	59.29	540	1,400	16	15°18′24″N 120°51′00″E
San Isidro		4th	2.4%	54,372	51,612	1.00%	56.49	21.81	960	2,500	9	15°18′35″N 120°54′23″E
San Jose (Cabaritan)	∗	2nd	6.5%	150,917	139,738	1.48%	185.99	71.81	810	2,100	38	15°47′24″N 120°59′24″E
San Leonardo		4th	3.0%	68,536	65,299	0.93%	151.90	58.65	450	1,200	15	15°21′39″N 120°57′33″E
Santa Rosa		3rd	3.3%	75,649	69,467	1.64%	147.15	56.81	510	1,300	33	15°25′29″N 120°56′17″E
Santo Domingo		1st	2.6%	61,092	57,943	1.01%	74.88	28.91	820	2,100	24	15°35′11″N 120°52′40″E
Talavera		1st	5.7%	132,338	124,829	1.12%	140.92	54.41	940	2,400	53	15°34′48″N 120°55′12″E
Talugtug		5th	1.1%	25,236	23,817	1.11%	93.95	36.27	270	700	28	15°46′42″N 120°48′28″E
Zaragoza		1st	2.3%	53,090	49,387	0.71%	72.02	27.81	740	1,900	19	15°26′54″N 120°47′41″E
Total				2,310,134	2,151,461	1.36%	5,689.69	2,196.80	410	1,100	849	(see GeoGroup box)
1. Former names are italicized.; 2. Coordinates mark the town center, and are sortable by latitude.

=== Climate ===
Climate data for Nueva Ecija
Month	Jan	Feb	Mar	Apr	May	Jun	Jul	Aug	Sep	Oct	Nov	Dec	Year
Mean daily maximum °C (°F)	32.1 (89.8)	32.8 (91.0)	34.4 (93.9)	36.2 (97.2)	35.3 (95.5)	34.0 (93.2)	32.8 (91.0)	32.1 (89.8)	32.4 (90.3)	32.8 (91.0)	32.7 (90.9)	32.0 (89.6)	33.3 (91.9)
Mean daily minimum °C (°F)	21.1 (70.0)	21.6 (70.9)	22.7 (72.9)	23.8 (74.8)	24.6 (76.3)	24.5 (76.1)	24.2 (75.6)	24.4 (75.9)	24.1 (75.4)	23.7 (74.7)	22.9 (73.2)	21.9 (71.4)	23.3 (73.9)
Average rainy days	1	2	2	3	13	16	22	21	20	10	8	4	122
Source: Storm247

== Demographics ==
Population percentage
(2015 Census)

- Aliaga: 63,543 (3.0%)
- Bongabon: 64,173 (3.0%)
- Cabanatuan: 302,231 (14.0%)
- Cabiao: 79,007 (3.7%)
- Carranglan: 41,131 (1.9%)
- Cuyapo: 65,039 (3.0%)
- Gabaldon: 35,383 (1.6%)
- Gapan: 110,303 (5.1%)
- Gen. M. Natividad: 41,656 (1.9%)
- Gen. Tinio: 47,865 (2.2%)
- Guimba: 118,655 (5.5%)
- Jaen: 73,184 (3.4%)
- Laur: 35,656 (1.7%)
- Licab: 28,254 (1.3%)
- Llanera: 39,701 (1.8%)
- Lupao: 43,788 (2.0%)
- Muñoz: 81,483 (3.8%)
- Nampicuan: 14,954 (0.7%)
- Palayan: 41,041 (1.9%)
- Pantabangan: 29,925 (1.4%)
- Peñaranda: 29,882 (1.4%)
- Quezon: 40,592 (1.9%)
- Rizal: 64,087 (3.0%)
- San Antonio: 77,836 (3.6%)
- San Isidro: 51,612 (2.4%)
- San Jose: 139,738 (6.5%)
- San Leonardo: 65,299 (3.0%)
- Santa Rosa: 69,467 (3.2%)
- Santo Domingo: 57,943 (2.7%)
- Talavera: 124,829 (5.8%)
- Talugtug: 23,817 (1.1%)
- Zaragoza: 49,387 (2.3%)
Total population: 2,151,461

The population of Nueva Ecija in the 2024 census was 2,395,816 people, with a density of 420 inhabitants per square kilometre or 1,100 inhabitants per square mile.

Population census of Nueva Ecija

Year	Pop.	±% p.a.
1903	134,147	—
1918	227,096	+3.57%
1939	416,762	+2.93%
1948	467,769	+1.29%
1960	608,362	+2.21%
1970	851,294	+3.41%
1975	947,995	+2.18%
1980	1,069,409	+2.44%

Year	Pop.	±% p.a.
1990	1,312,680	+2.07%
1995	1,505,827	+2.61%
2000	1,659,883	+2.11%
2007	1,843,853	+1.46%
2010	1,955,373	+2.16%
2015	2,151,461	+1.84%
2020	2,310,134	+1.51%
2024	2,395,816	+0.88%

Source: Philippine Statistics Authority

=== Ethnicity ===
According to the Atlas Filipinas published by the National Commission for Culture and the Arts of the Philippines, 11 local ethnic languages with living ethnic speakers are present in Nueva Ecija, namely Tagalog (in the entire province), Abellen (in a small part in the centre), Kapampangan (in the southwest-most section), Kankanaey (in the east central), Ilokano (in the northern areas and in a small section in the centre, spoken with a Tagalog accent), Alta (in the east central), Ayta Mag-antsi (in the centre and the north-central), Bugkalut (in Carranglan, Pantabangan, and Bongabon), Ibaloy (in Carranglan), and Kalanguya and Isinay (in Carranglan); another language spoken in the province is Pangasinan, predominantly in northwest areas. Kapampangans were the native residents of the northwest areas; Pangasinan settlers moved there during early years of Spanish period until the Kapampangans assimilated to the Pangasinan settlers. Like mentioned aboved, Nueva Ecija was natively Kapampangan when Spaniards arrived, but when British invaded Manila, the province became dominantly Tagalog after many Tagalog refugees from Manila & north areas of Cavite escaped to Nueva Ecija, where the original Kapampangan settlers welcomed them and assimilated to them, many of the Tagalog settlers arrived in Nueva Ecija directly from Bulacan; other Tagalog settlers arrived from Tayabas (now Quezon), Batangas, & Laguna.

=== Languages ===
The majority of the population speaks both Tagalog and English. The province primarily speaks Tagalog dialect called Bulacan Tagalog that resembles poetic form of speech, with a Novoecijano flavor, that added loanwords of Ilocano and Kapampangan origin. Ilocano is also widely spoken in Nueva Ecija, specifically in the northern and central parts of the province. Pangasinan is mostly spoken in northwest areas of the province and Kapampangan in the southwest. Languages not native in the province are also spoken to varying degrees by their respective ethnic communities within the province, and ethnic groups who grew up within environment of other ethnic group also speak other native languages as second languages, like Kapampangans and Tagalogs who grew up within an Ilocano or Pangasinan population speak Ilocano or Pangasinan.

=== Religion ===
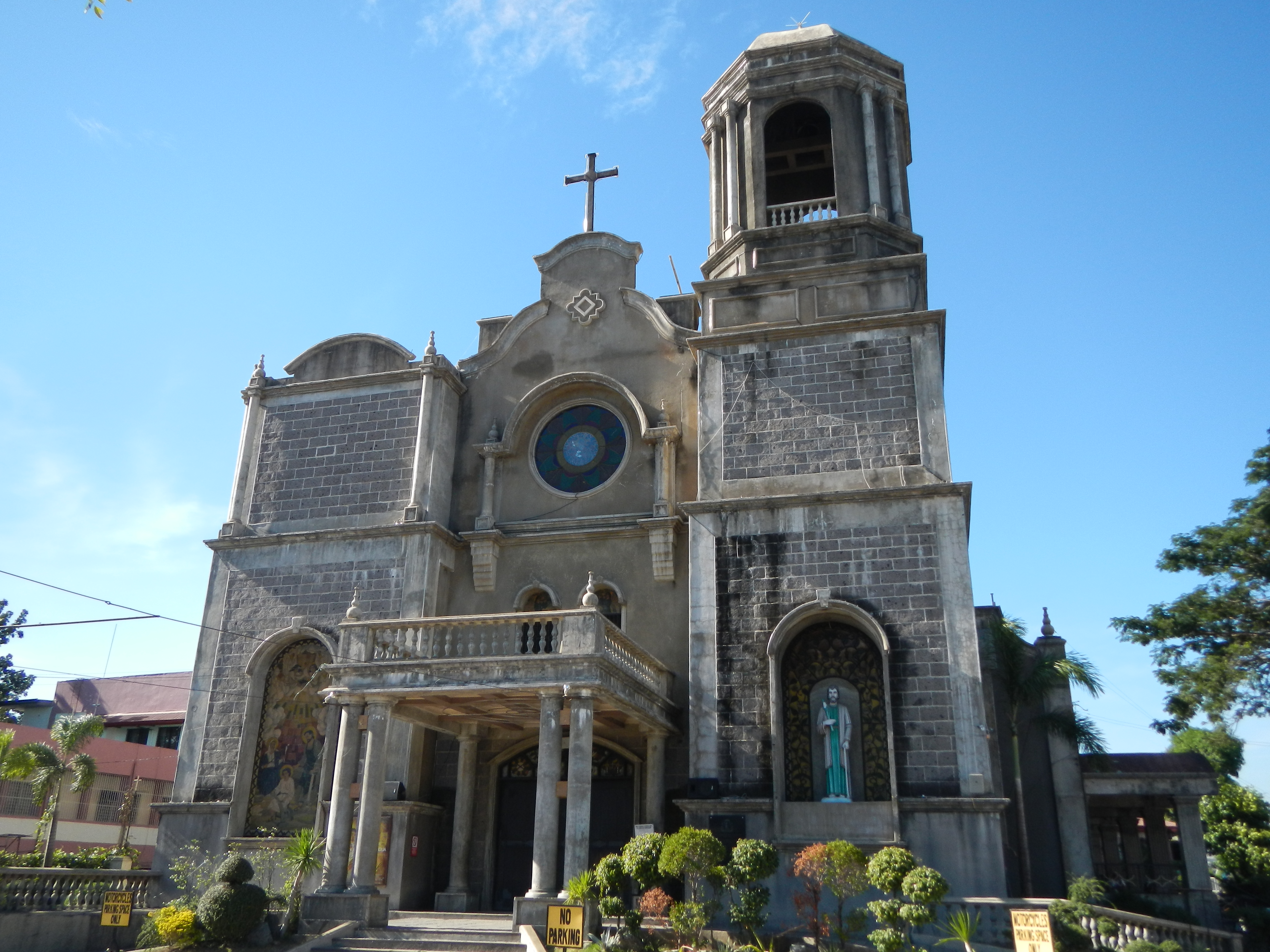
San Jose Cathedral

The province is predominantly Roman Catholic (about 82.43%). Other Christian groups are Iglesia ni Cristo (6.01%), Born-again Christians, Philippine Independent Church (2.50%), Evangelical (1.70%) & Methodists (1.62%). The remaining minorities (6.2%) are the Church of Jesus Christ of Latter-day Saints, Jehovah's Witnesses and Seventh-day Adventist & Muslims. Anitists, and animists are also represented in the province practiced by indigenous ethnic groups.

== Economy ==
Poverty incidence of Nueva Ecija (%)

Source: Philippine Statistics Authority

Nueva Ecija is considered the main rice growing province of the Philippines and the leading producer of onions in the country. The province has also been recognized as the "dairy capital of the Philippines" as it produces the most amount milk from cows and carabaos.

=== Major industries ===
Nueva Ecija is one of the top producers of agricultural products in the country. Its principal crops is mainly rice but corn and onion are produced in quantity. The province is often referred to as the "Rice Granary of the Philippines". Other major crops are mango, calamansi (calamondin orange), banana, garlic, and vegetables. The municipality of Bongabon at the eastern part of the province at the foot of the Sierra Madre mountains and its neighbouring Laur and Rizal are the major producers of onion and garlic. Bongabon is called the "onion capital of the country". A sunflower farm is housed inside the Central Luzon State University campus in Science City of Muñoz.

There are poultry farms in a number of towns, most notably, the Lorenzo poultry farms in San Isidro which is one of the largest in the country. Duck raising and egg production is an important livelihood. Fishponds are unevenly distributed throughout the province but the largest concentrations are in San Antonio, Santa Rosa, and Cuyapo.

Fabrication of tricycle "sidecars" is widespread in the province, notably in Santa Rosa.

Several areas have mineral deposits. Copper and manganese have been found in General Tinio, Carranglan, and Pantabangan. The upper reaches of Carranglan and Palayan City are said to contain gold.

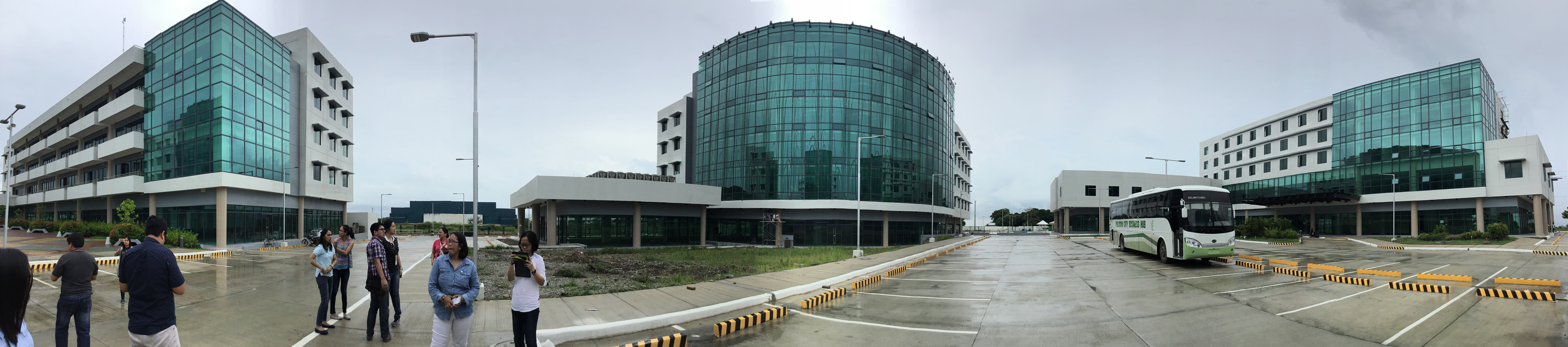
Palayan City Business Park

== Tourism ==
Tourism in Nueva Ecija famously includes national parks, heritage sites, resorts, and events like gatherings in churches and local festivals.

=== Historical Sites ===
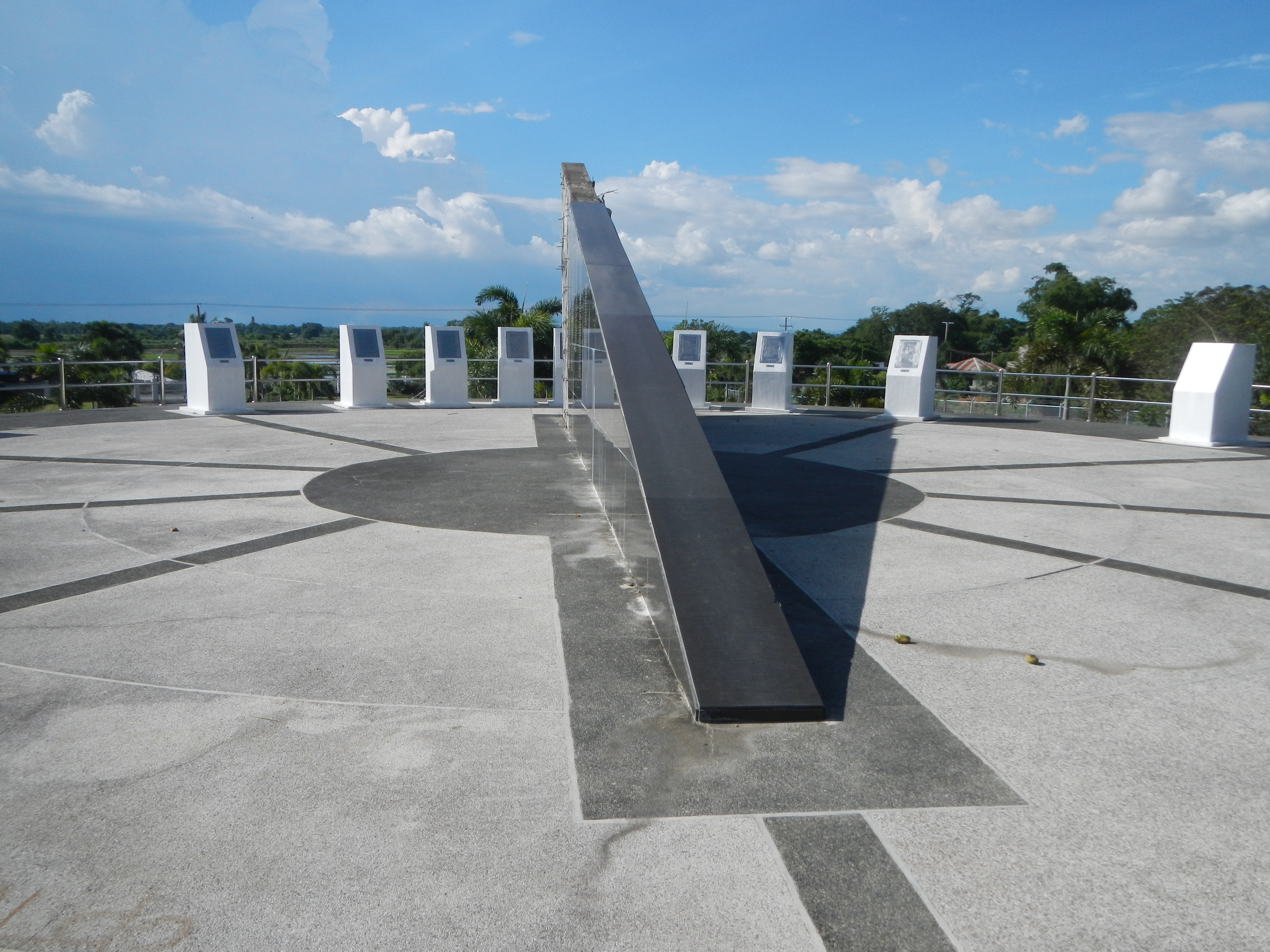
Camp Pangatian sundial

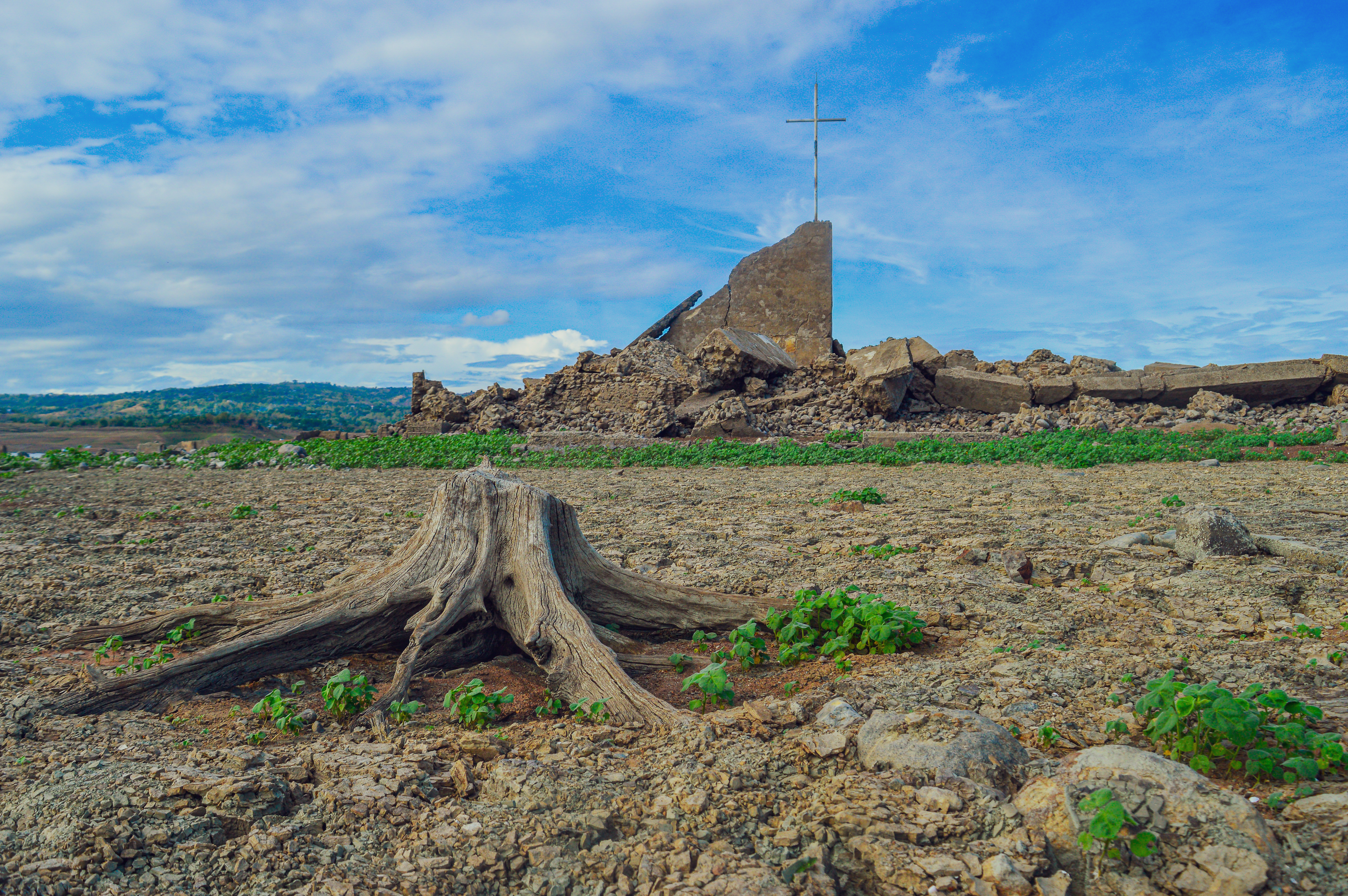
Ruins of Pantabangan

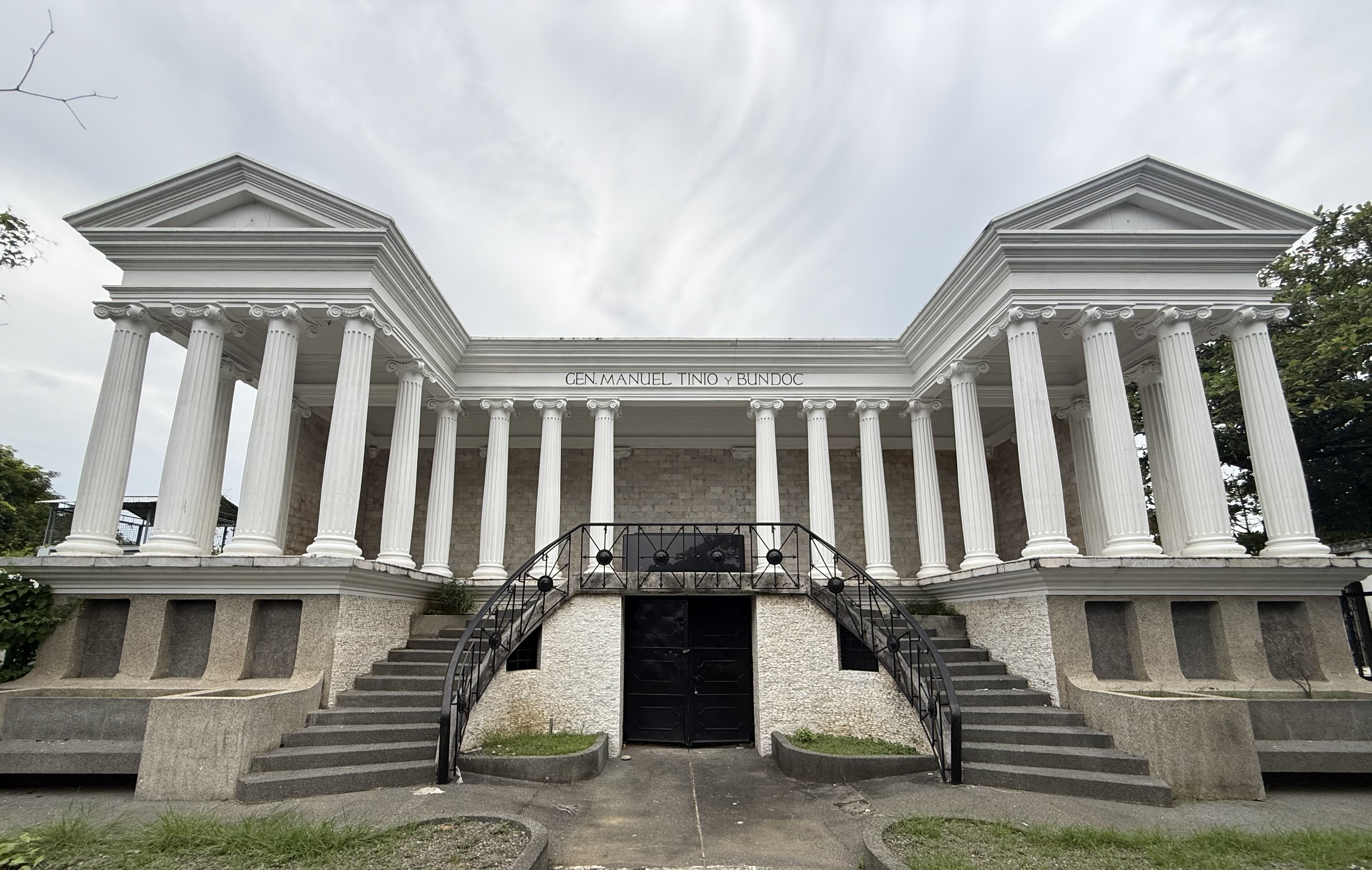
General Tinio Mausoleum and Historical Marker

- Gen. Antonio Luna Statue and Marker - a monument honoring the Philippine revolutionary hero General Antonio Luna. Depicted astride a horse, the statue stands at Plaza Lucero in front of the St. Nicholas of Tolentine Cathedral, marking the exact spot where the brave general was assassinated in 1899, in Cabanatuan City.
- Camp Pangatian Shrine (Prisoner of War Memorial) now Cabanatuan American Memorial - began as a military training camp for twenty years until converted into a concentration camp for allied prisoners of war during the Japanese occupation. It is a popular tourist destination among war veterans by way of the WWII Veteran's Homecoming Program. Camp Pangatian's liberation of World War II American prisoners of war held by the Japanese forces, in January 1945, was the most successful rescue operation ever executed by the American military aided by the Filipino guerillas who were fighting the invaders. That tactical operation was immortalized in the movie The Great Raid.
- Ruins of Pantabangan - refers to the submerged remnants of the nearly 300-year-old original town of Pantabangan in Nueva Ecija, Philippines. Established in 1645, the historic settlement was intentionally flooded in the 1970s to create the Pantabangan Dam reservoir, which provides irrigation and hydroelectric power.
- Fort Magsaysay's Aquino-Diokno Memorial - once held two of the country’s brightest minds in total solitary confinement.
- The Grand Sideco House - an ancestral house in San Isidro, which General Emilio Aguinaldo use to frequent. It was here that General Frederick Funston planned the capture of Aguinaldo during the Philippine–American War. It was once the headquarters of the First Philippine Republic in 1899.
- Quezon Family Rest House - a commemorative house in the town of Bongabon, the death place of former First Lady Aurora Quezon.
- Tabacalera of San Isidro - a former brick-built tobacco center in San Isidro that stands as a witness to the province's 100 years of oppression, from 1782 to 1882, when it served as the center of the tobacco monopoly in Central Luzon, restricting the cultivation of other crops.
- Triala Mansion - an ancestral house of General Manuel Tinio, built during the early Commonwealth period. It features ornately designed turn-of-the-century furniture and a life-size figure of esteemed Nove Ecijano Don Kapitan Berong in stained glass.
- Wright Institute, now Nueva Ecija High School - One of the first high schools established outside Metro Manila during the American period. Originally located in San Isidro, it was transferred to Cabanatuan in 1921. The main building is a large Gabldon-type structure, a hallmark of early 20th century Philippine public school architecture. A historical marker was unveiled in 2022, recognizing its architectural and historical importance.
- Gat Apolinario Mabini Shrine - a commemorative marker for the site of the arrest of Philippine hero Apolinario Mabini, known as "the sublime paralytic", by the Americans on December 10, 1899, in Cuyapo.
- Ling Hong Temple - built in 1938, it is the second oldest Buddhist temple in the Philippines.
- Old Provincial Capitol of Nueva Ecija - built in 1912 and designed by American architect William E. Parsons, renowned for works such as the Manila Hotel and Gabaldon school buildings. The structure reflects a neoclassical style with park-like grounds, characteristic of government architecture during the American Colonial Period. The old edifice has since been renovated and expanded.
- Cabanatuan Railroad Station - built in 1927 to replace an earlier 1905 station. It served as the terminus of the Balagtas-Cabanatuan line. Railway operations were interrupted during World War II and resumed only in 1969. With the decline of rail transport, it was later converted into the barangay hall of General Luna, retaining elements of the original structure as a reminder of the city's transportation history.
- General Manuel Tinio Mausoleum and Marker - is the resting place of General Manuel Tinio, the youngest general of the Philippine Revolutionary Army. It is located at the Cabanatuan City Cemetery. A historical marker was installed in 1977 by the National Historical Commission of the Philippines (NHCP) to honor his legacy. Tinio served as Governor of Nueva Ecija and later as director of the Bureau of Lands during the American colonial period.
- Paliparang Maniquiz (P.A.A.C.), 1968 Marker - located within the Camp Tinio National High School compound. It was once the site of the PAAC Advance School of Flying, relocated there in 1941. Named after Lt. Eliseo Maniquiz of Gapan, Nueva Ecija, it became a training ground for the Philippine Army Air Corps during WWII. A historical marker was installed in 1968.
- Lázaro Francisco Historical Marker - a historical marker honoring the National Artist for Literature, Lázaro Francisco. It was installed at the Lázaro Francisco Integrated School in Cabanatuan City. The marker commemorates his literary legacy and his contributions to Philippine literature.

=== Historical Churches ===
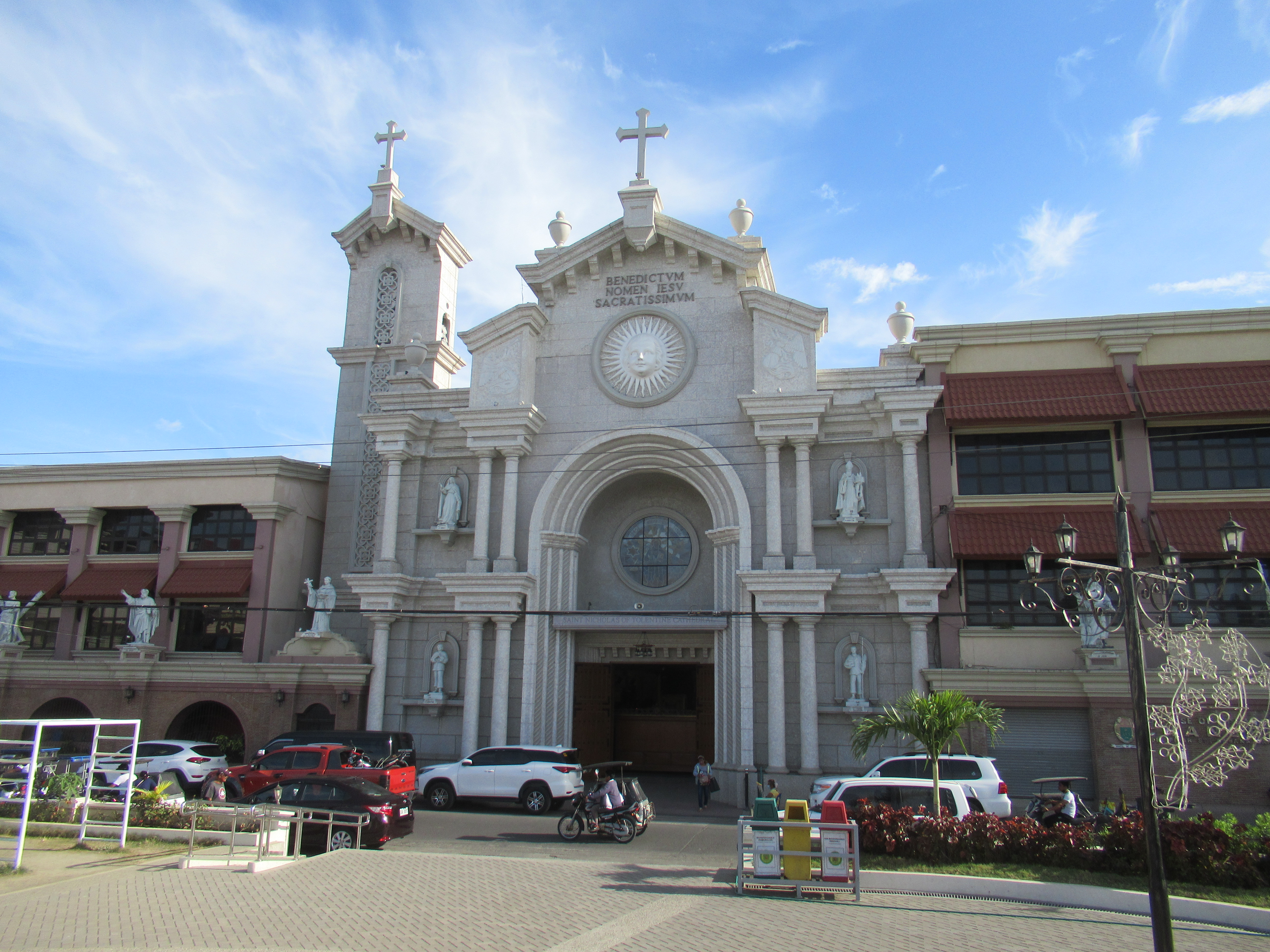
Cabanatuan Cathedral (Saint Nicholas of Tolentine Parish Cathedral)

- Cabanatuan Cathedral (Saint Nicholas of Tolentine Parish Cathedral) - established in 1700 by Augustinian priests as a visita of Gapan, the parish transitioned to secular clergy in 1866, coinciding with the construction of its first stone church and convent under Jose de la Fuente. These structures were destroyed by an earthquake in 1880 and subsequently rebuilt by Mariano Rivas in 1891. The cathedral's convent briefly served as the seat of the Philippine Revolutionary Government under President Emilio Aguinaldo in 1899. Notably, General Antonio Luna was assassinated by members of the Kawit Battalion on June 5, 1899, in front of the cathedral at Plaza Lucero.
- Minor Basilica and National Shrine of La Virgen Divina Pastora (Gapan Church) - a Byzantine architecture church in Gapan City built from 1856 to 1872 which has been declared as a National Cultural Treasure, the first in the entire province of Nueva Ecija.
- Peñaranda Church - one of the oldest in the province, built in 1887.
- San Nicolas de Tolentino Parish Church (Carranglan Church)
- San Roque Parish Church - established in the early 20th century in Cuyapo, this historic church stands as a testament to the community's faith and resilience, notably serving as a center of devotion and protection during a devastating cholera epidemic in 1909.
- Sanctuary of the Holy Face of Jesus (Nampicuan Church) - houses the Holy Face of Jesus relic, a cloth bearing an image imprint of the face of Jesus from Manoppello in Italy.

=== Natural Tourist Spots ===
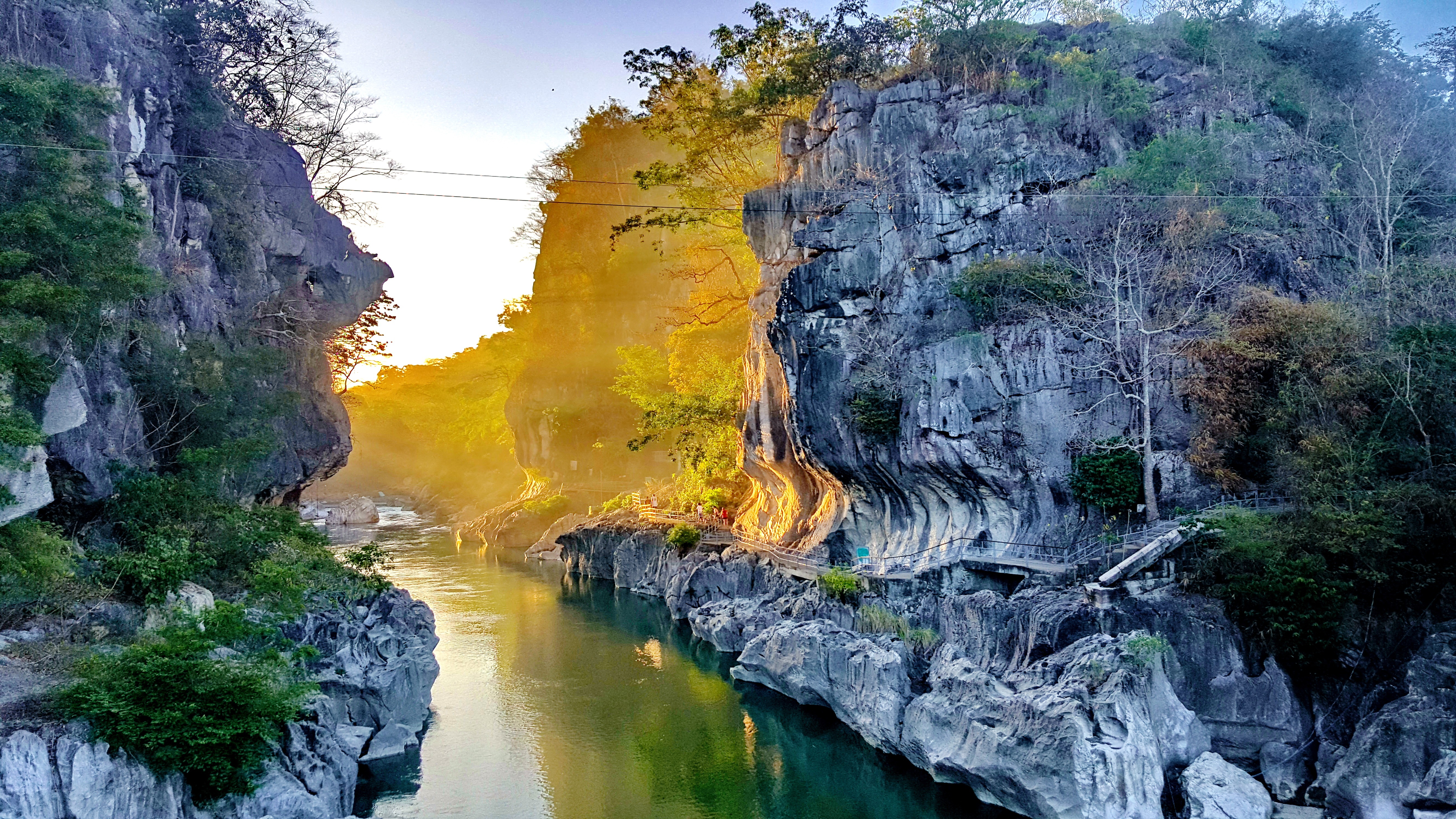
Minalungao National Park

- Minalungao National Park - located in the town of General Tinio, having been established in 1967. The park spans approximately 2,018 hectares and is renowned for its picturesque, emerald-green Peñaranda River, which is flanked by towering limestone walls reaching up to 16 meters high.
- Pantabangan Dam - the first and only rubber dam in Asia. It functions as an irrigation, a hydroelectric power generation, and a flood control dam of Nueva Ecija. The dam's reservoir, Pantabangan Lake, is among the largest in Southeast Asia and is noted for its cleanliness. The dam's hydroelectric facility comprises two 60 MW turbines, contributing significantly to the region's power supply.
- Mt. 387 (Batong Amat) - situated in Carranglan, this mountain is known as the "Chocolate Hills of the North" due to its rolling hills, stunning morning sea of clouds and view decks overlooking the Caraballo Mountains. Historically known as Batong Amat (Ghost Rock), it served as a strategic World War II battleground for Filipino, American, and Japanese forces.
- Colosboa Hills - situated in Barangay Colosboa, Cuyapo, this eco-tourism site is dubbed the "New Zealand of Central Luzon" due to its rolling green hills and vast meadows. It features a 3-kilometer mountain bike trail with both uphill and downhill tracks designed for bikers. Under House Bill No. 7688 introduced in the Nineteenth Congress, the area is targeted for prioritization and development by the Department of Tourism (DOT).
- Deesap Falls - located in Bongabon, it is the tallest waterfall in the province. This natural wonder is situated at the foot of the Sierra Madre mountain range and is characterized by multi-tiered cascades. It was featured in the travel documentary program Biyahe ni Drew.
- Dalton Pass - located in Capintalan, Carranglan. It primarily serves as a crucial segment of the Pan-Philippine Highway (Maharlika Highway) and acts as the major gateway to the Cagayan Valley and the Ifugao Rice Terraces. It also contains a five-hectare area which houses the monument of General Dalton and a tower that borders the provinces of Nueva Ecija and Nueva Vizcaya. Uphill is a World War II memorial in black marble where a historical account of the war had been etched in English and Japanese.
- Mt. Mingan - standing at 1,901 meters above sea level, this mountain is a major peak in the Sierra Madre mountain range bridging Gabaldon and Dingalan, Aurora. It is legally declared as a critical habitat and a strictly protected area due to it being an established sanctuary for the endangered Philippine Eagle (Pithecophaga jefferyi). Treks to its mossy forests require strict permits and coordination with local tourism authorities.
- Calabasa Picnic River - located in Gabaldon.
- Mount Olivete - located in Bongabon, frequently visited by pilgrims due to its holy spring.
- Mount Kemalugong (Paasa Peak) - highest point in Nueva Ecija known for its sea of clouds.
- Mt. Bulaylay - situated in Cuyapo.
- Aloha Falls - a waterfall located near Mt. 387.
- Silangan Falls - a stunning waterfall situated in Bongabon.
- Suklab Falls - a natural waterfall situated amidst the forested eco-tourism area of Sitio Bulak in Barangay Rio Chico, General Tinio.
- Pinsal Falls - situated in Lupao.
- Gabaldon Falls - located in Gabaldon which is within the Sabani Estate Agricultural College.
- General Luna Falls - situated in the town of Rizal.
- Palasapas Falls - located in San Jose City.
- Calaanan Falls, Bongabon
- San Fernando Falls, Bongabon
- Warasiwis Falls, Lupao
- Awitan Falls, Pantabangan
- Inasan Falls, Gabaldon
- Tanawan - situated in Laur, it is famous for its bike trail.
- Mount Mapait - found in Palayan City.
- Capintalan - a reserve known for its WWII tunnels, forests, rivers, and artifacts and has been maintained by the only Ifugao community in Nueva Ecija, located in Carranglan.
- Philippine Eagle Exclusive Area - established in the Nueva Ecija part of the Sierra Madres.
- Diamond Park - located in San Jose City.
- Nabao Lake, Cabiao
- Fort Magsaysay Dam (Pahingahan Dam), Palayan City
- Dupinga River, Gabaldon
- Bato Ferry Bridge, Laur
- Labi River, Bongabon
- Paitan Lake (Libsong Lake) - located in Cuyapo, this tranquil seasonal haven attracts migratory birds from September to February, making it a popular destination for birdwatchers and nature enthusiasts.

=== Others ===
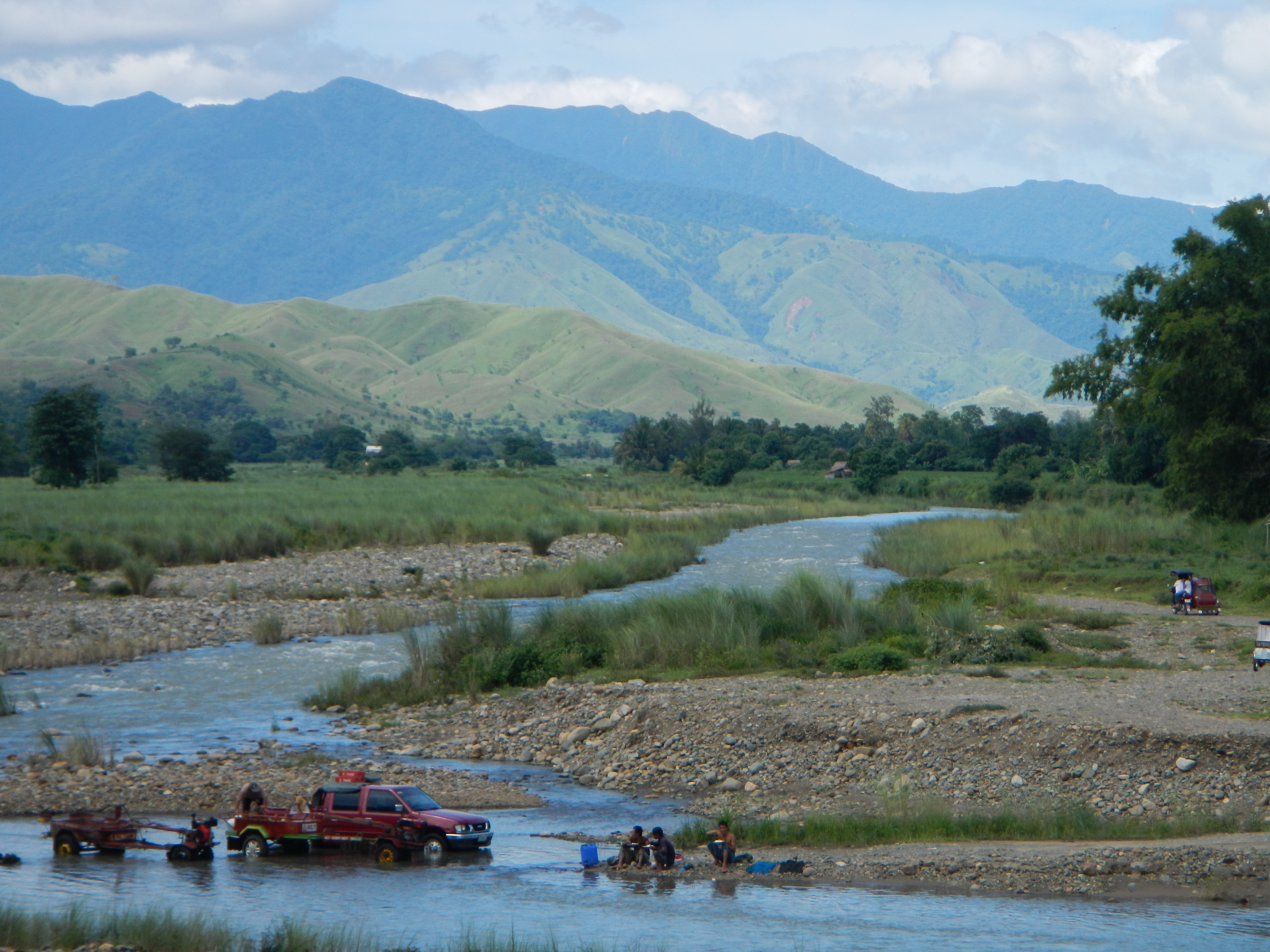
Landscape at Carranglan

- Philippine Carabao Center - headquartered in Muñoz; it is the main arm of the national government on carabao research and development, featuring an agri-tourism hub where visitors can experience hands-on calf feeding and cow milking alongside a dedicated dairy product outlet.
- Philippine Rice Research Institute - the main research and experimentation arm of the government for rice and other crops.
- Central Luzon State University - the only university in the province to be declared a cultural property of the nation. It includes the CLSU Agricultural Museum, the Living Fish Museum, and serves as the research site that developed the internationally award-winning Tilapia Ice Cream.
- Fort Magsaysay - primarily known as the largest military reservation in the Philippines spanning Palayan City and Laur, it also serves as a prominent eco-tourism and summer getaway destination. The vast reservation features dedicated public recreational spaces including the man-made Pahingahan Dam for boating and fishing, scenic picnic grounds, and diverse outdoor sports facilities set within its forested hills.
- Highland Bali - known as the "Bali of the North", it is located in Pantabangan. This prominent tourism destination is known for its Balinese-themed architecture and luxury amenities. Situated along the hills overlooking the Pantabangan Lake, it serves as a major landmark for eco-tourism and has frequently hosted high-profile Filipino celebrities for vacations and private events.
- Little Vigan (Lumang Gapan) - a historic heritage and cultural tourism site located in Gapan City. Centered around Plaza Independencia and the Gapan Church, it features preserved ancestral brick houses, beautifully illuminated cobblestone streets, and active open-air night markets highlighting local heritage and street food culture.
- Upper Tabuating Dam - an infrastructure and water resource development project completed by the National Irrigation Administration (NIA) located in General Tinio.
- PMP Man-Made Paradise Farm - a prominent agri-tourism and farm resort destination located in Barangay Nazareth, General Tinio.
- George Point Dino Park - a prominent family-oriented eco-tourism attraction located in Pantabangan, featuring large-scale animatronic dinosaur displays and interactive recreational activities set against the mountainous scenic backdrop.
- Gapan City Ferris Wheel
- Rice Science Museum, Science City of Muñoz
- Freedom Park, Cabanatuan City
- NFA Grains Industry Museum, Cabanatuan City
- Museo Novo Ecijano, Palayan City
- Lomboy Farms, Guimba
- Carron Dreampark in San Isidro, Nueva Ecija

== Government ==
The Governor of Nueva Ecija is the highest-ranking official in the province, after the President of the Philippines. The province is divided into six congressional districts, which consists of 27 municipalities and five cities, namely: Cabanatuan, San Jose, Palayan, Gapan and Science City of Muñoz. The provincial capital is Palayan City. The current governor of the province is Aurelio Umali and its vice governor is Gil Raymond Umali.

Capitols of Nueva Ecija

New Provincial Capitol (seat of Government) of Nueva Ecija is at Palayan City.

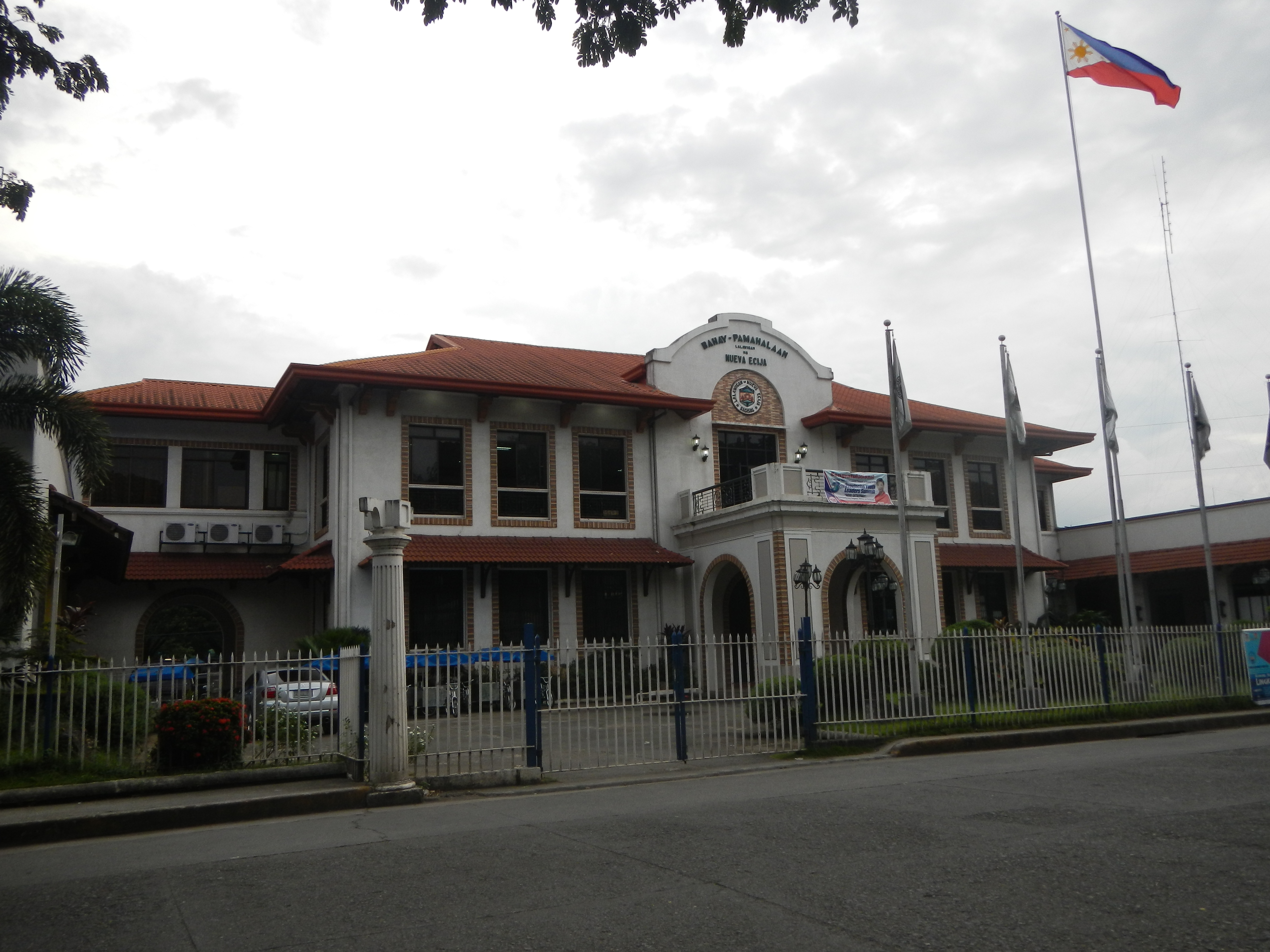
The Governor and Provincial Officers still hold office at the Old Provincial Capitol in Cabanatuan

Current Provincial Government Officials (2025-2028):

- Governor: Aurelio "Oyie" M. Umali (Unang Sigaw)
- Vice-Governor: Gil Raymond M. Umali (Unang Sigaw)

Sangguniang Panlalawigan Members:

1st District:

- Belinda E. Pallilio (Unang Sigaw)
- Reichel Ann R. Villanueva (Unang Sigaw)
- Eric Daniel F. Salazar (Unang Sigaw)

2nd District:

- Ferdinand V. Dysico (Unang Sigaw)
- Jason J. Abalos (NUP)

3rd District:

- Eduardo Jose B. Jose VII (PFP)
- Prudencio B. Garcia Jr. (PFP)

4th District:

- Inocencio T. Bautista Jr. (Lakas)
- Ray B. Padiernos Jr. (Unang Sigaw
- Mary Sweet Liberty N. Cruz (Unang Sigaw)

Ex-Officio Members:

- Sonny J. Cariño (President, Liga ng mga Barangay)
- Lance A. Santos (President, PCL)
- Sweet Cruz (President, Panlalawigang Pederasyon ng Sangguniang Kabataan)
- Dante C. Wagayen Jr. (Representative, IPMR)

=== House of Representatives ===
District	Representative	Party	Term	Bloc
1st	Mikaela "Mika" B. Suansing	PFP	2	Majority
2nd	Mario "Kokoy" O. Salvador	PFP	1	Majority
3rd	Julius Cesar "Jay" V. Vergara	PFP	1	Majority
4th	Emerson "Emeng" D. Pascual	NUP	2	Majority

== Culture ==
Novo Ecijano culture, primarily Tagalog in base, also has a mixture of Kapampangan, Pangasinense, Ilokano, and other indigenous cultures within the province. A melting pot of culture, the province has a varied of festivals, traditions, and beliefs that constitute Novo Ecijano heritage, along with tangible heritage structures, scenes, and objects.

=== Cuisine ===
Novo Ecijano cuisine is varied. In its northwest, seafood and vegetable dishes with a lot of salt is prevalent due to its proximity with Pangasinan. In its northwest, highland crops are much prized. In its central and southern areas, food is very diverse due to its proximity with numerous sources of ingredients.

The province is known for various localized culinary specialties. These include the longganisa of Cabanatuan, traditional rice cakes (kakanin) from San Jose, Peñaranda, and San Antonio, and carabao milk products originating from Talavera, Cabiao, and Muñoz. Additionally, towns like Cuyapo and San Jose are noted for their pancit, while San Leonardo and Muñoz are recognized for their local goat stew. The province is also recognized for "tinumis," a distinct local variant of pork blood stew (dinuguan) native to Nueva Ecija that uniquely utilizes tamarind leaves or tamarind fruit as a souring agent instead of vinegar. For desserts and baked goods, the city of Cabanatuan is widely noted for its homegrown confectionery culture, driven by established local brands such as Edna's Cakeland.

=== Literature ===
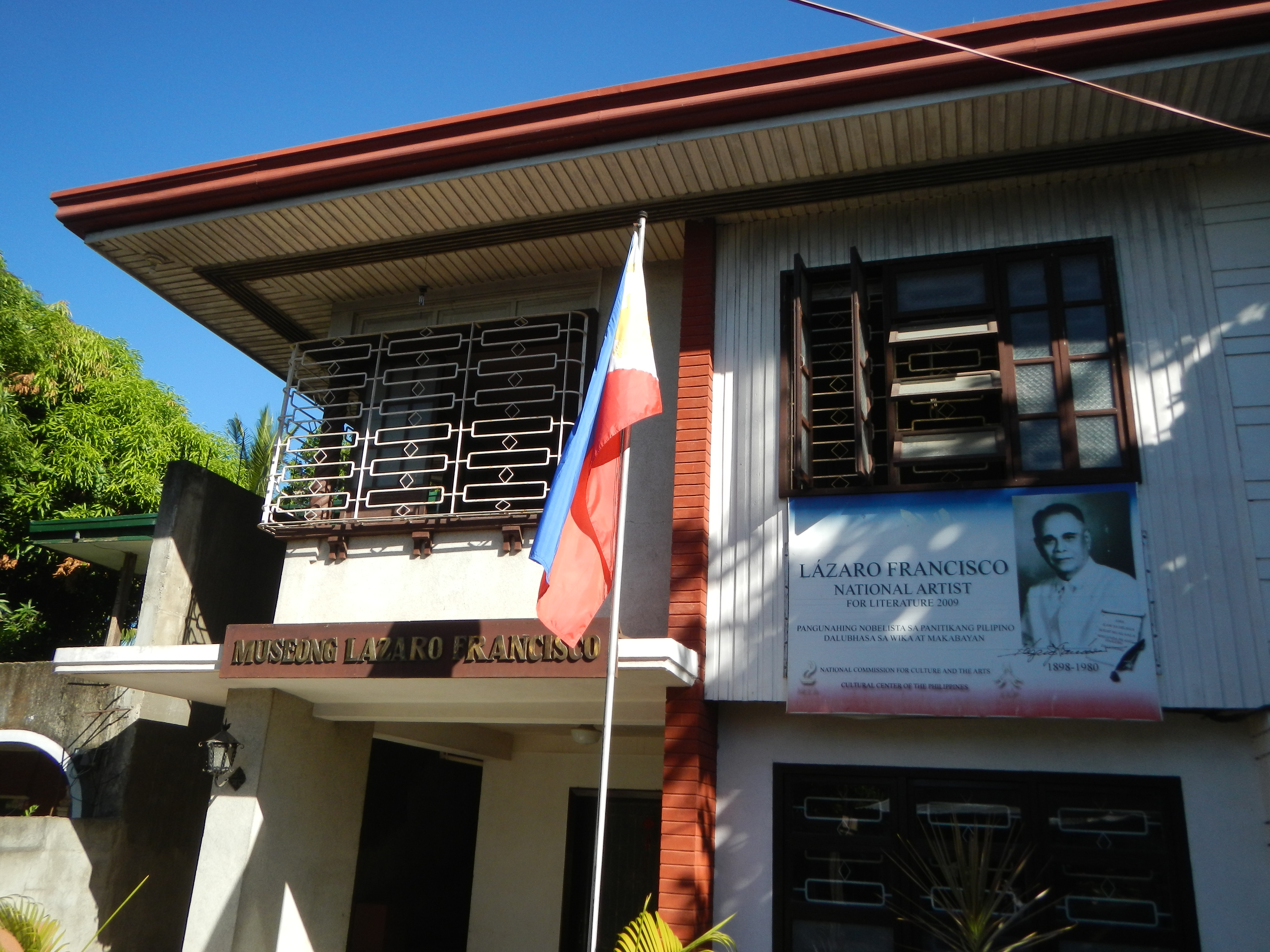
Museong Lazaro Francisco

The best known Tagalog novelist of the province is Lázaro Francisco. His novels depicted life in an agrarian society that gave rise to the social unrest of his period (1950s and 1960s). One of his novels was serialized by Liwayway Magazine, the most popular Tagalog magazine at that time until the 1970s. But unlike the Partido Komunista ng Pilipinas, Lazaro advocated for the peaceful resolution of the agrarian problem, relying on the benevolence of the government and the landlords.

=== Sports ===
The province is home to the Nueva Ecija Rice Vanguards of the Maharlika Pilipinas Basketball League (MPBL). The team won the 2022 MPBL finals, where they also accomplished the first and only regular season sweep in the league.

=== Festivals ===
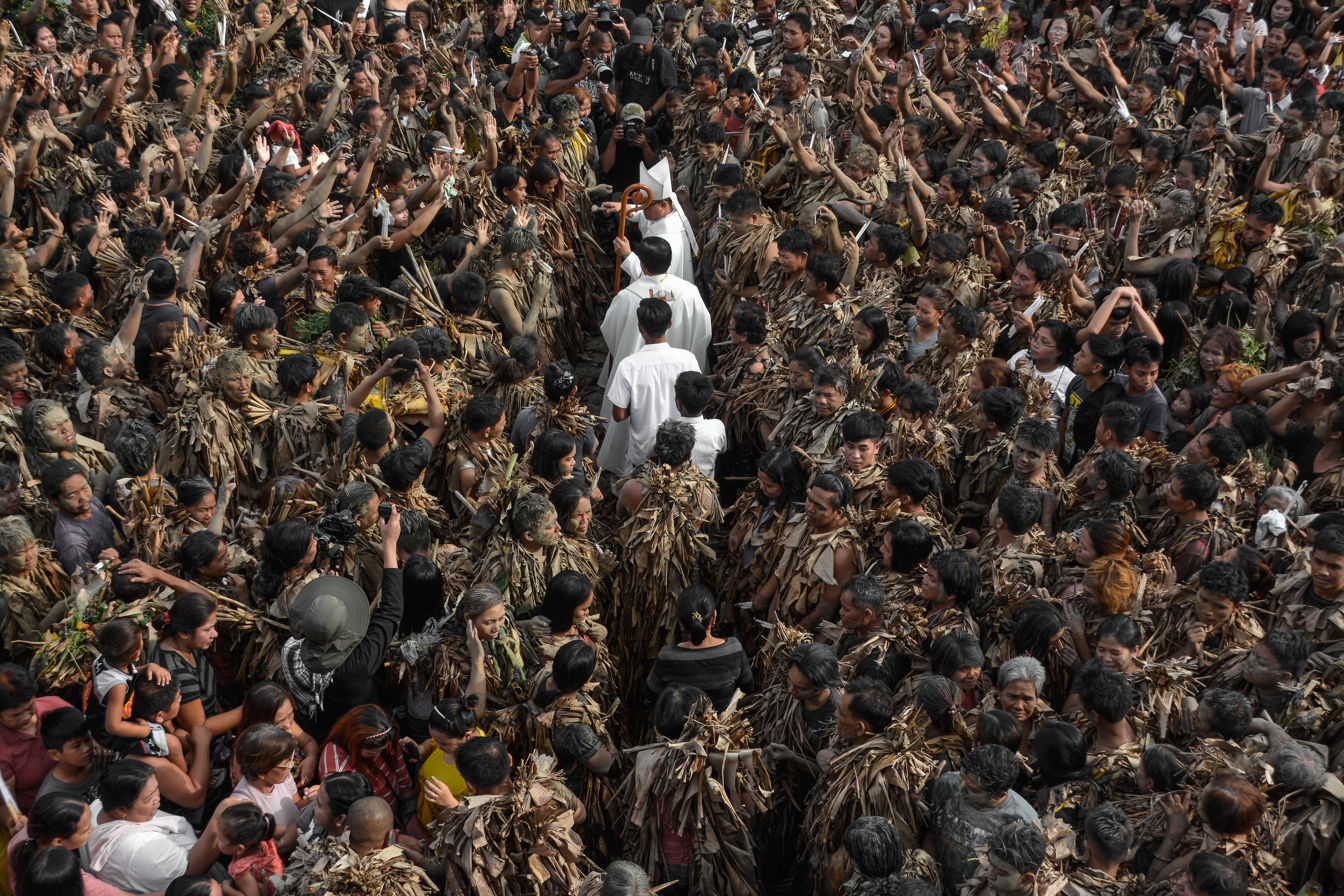
Taong Putik festival in Aliaga

Local festivals in Nueva Ecija typically reflect the province's agricultural heritage and cultural traditions. For example, San Jose celebrates the Tanduyong Festival every fourth Sunday of April, a colorful street dancing event that gives thanks for the onion harvest, and the Pagibang Damara, held in April or May, which marks the conclusion of the harvest season and serves as a communal expression of thanksgiving.

The Banatu Festival in Cabanatuan, which coincides with the city's founding anniversary, derives its name from banatu (vine) symbolizing growth and unity within the city.

In Aliaga, the Taong Putik festival is held annually on June 24 in honor of John the Baptist. Participants cover themselves in mud and dried banana leaves while asking for alms and candles, reenacting a local interpretation of a biblical story associated with the saint.

Bongabon's Sibuyas Festival, observed from April 1 to 10, highlights the municipality’s prominence as country's top onion producer and serves as a tribute to its farmers.

Other notable celebrations in the province highlighting local culture and industries include the Pandawan Festival of Pantabangan, the Kesong Puti Festival of Talavera, and the Kariton Festival celebrated in the municipality of Licab.

== Education ==
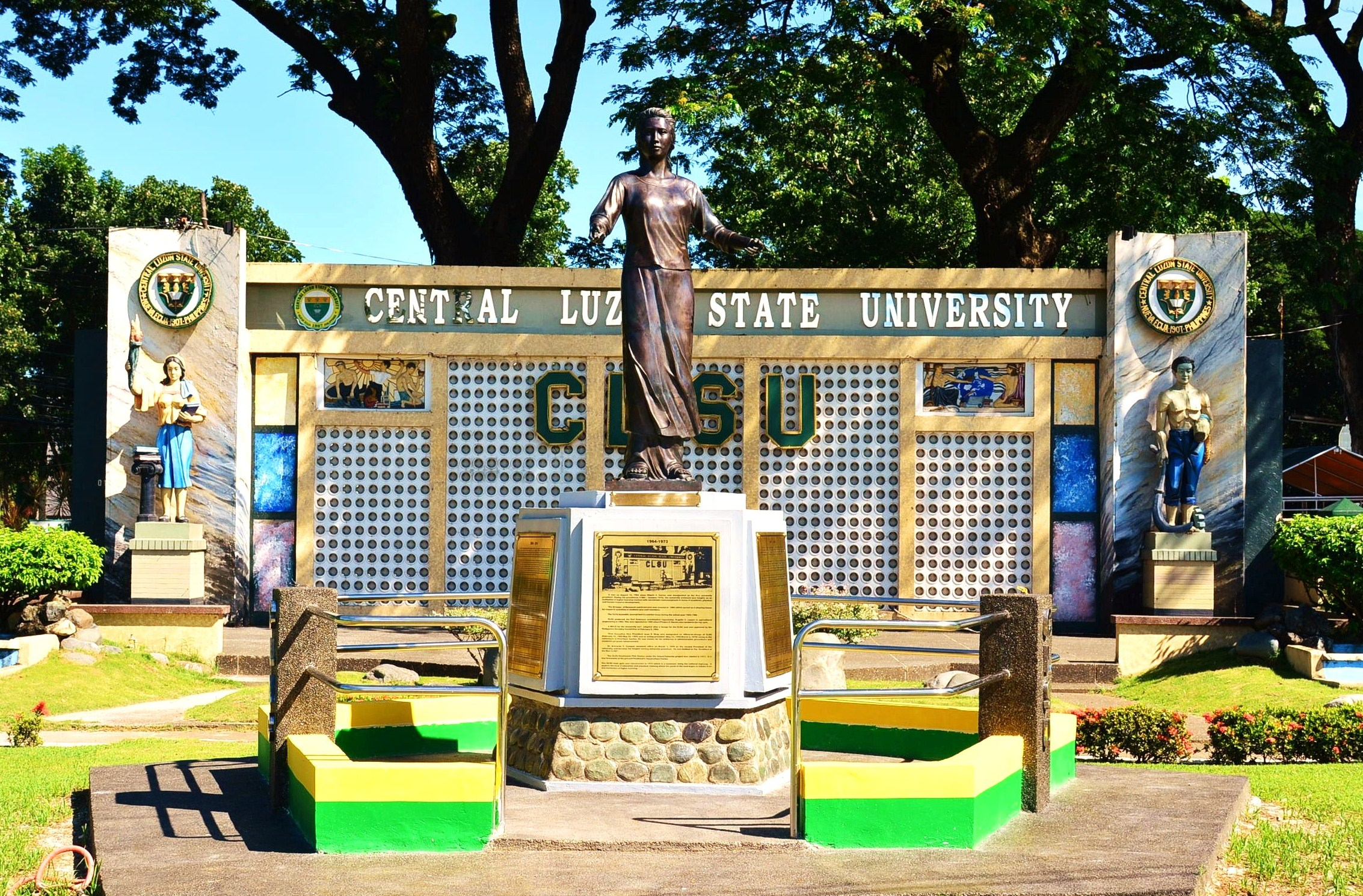
Central Luzon State University main gate

Nueva Ecija hosts several prominent educational institutions that serve as major centers of learning in Central Luzon.

The Central Luzon State University, located in the Science City of Muñoz, is one of the country’s leading state universities known for its programs in agriculture, fisheries, and science and technology research. The Nueva Ecija University of Science and Technology, with its main campus in Cabanatuan City, offers a wide range of undergraduate and graduate programs in engineering, education, and information technology.

The province is also home to Wesleyan University Philippines, a private Methodist university in Cabanatuan City. Other notable institutions include Araullo University, the largest private university in the Province with three campuses, and the College of the Immaculate Conception, one of the oldest Catholic educational institutions in the province.

Two extra universities are the Polytechnic University of the Philippines in Cabiao, and Our Lady of Fatima University in Cabanatuan City.

== See also ==
- Intangible Cultural Heritage of the Philippines
- List of radio stations in Nueva Ecija
- Super regions of the Philippines
- Meralco Terra Solar Farm
