= CICT =

CICT may refer to:

== College of information and communication technology known as CICT ==
- Taguig City University, Philippines
- Holy Angel University, Angeles City, Pampanga, Philippines
- Camarines Sur Polytechnic Colleges, Nabua, Camarines Sur, Philippines

== Other uses ==
- Central Institute of Classical Tamil, Chennai, India
- CICT-DT, the Global Television Network's owned-and-operated television station in Calgary, Canada
- Commission on Information and Communications Technology (Philippines)
