= Super regions of the Philippines =

Former grouping of regions and provinces of the Philippines based on economic strengths

The super regions of the Philippines are an informal and de facto defunct grouping of parts of regions and provinces of the Philippines based on their economic strengths. According to the 2006 Executive Order No. 561, which established these regions,

"[These] groupings neither supersede current political boundaries nor alter the regional development councils as established by existing laws and issuances."

The creation of super regions was first proposed by the President Gloria Macapagal Arroyo in her sixth State of the Nation Address to group the selected regions/provinces by their economic strengths. Each super region was headed by a Development Champion.

== Composition ==
The super regions were the four following:

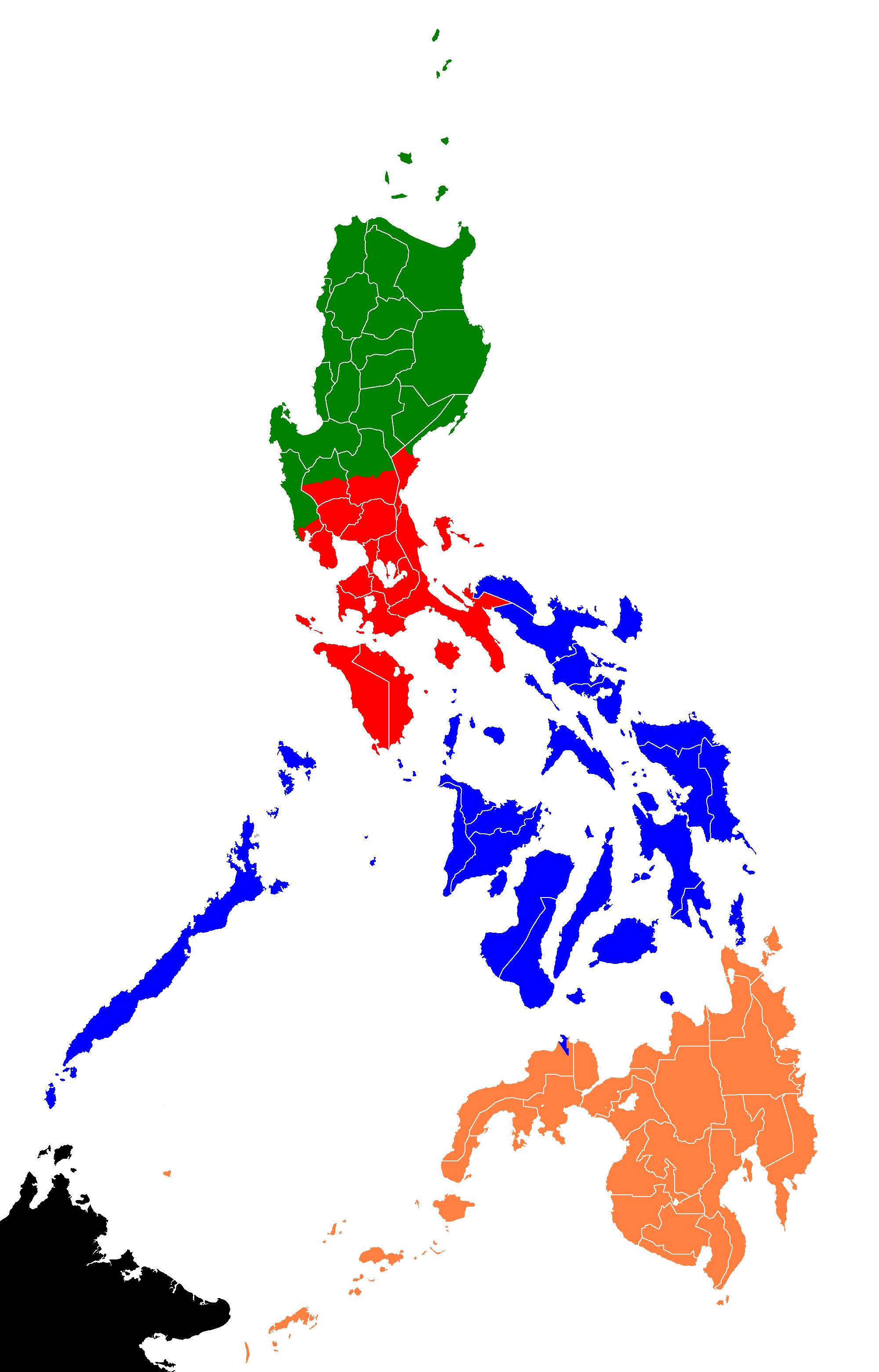
Map of the Philippines divided into the proposed super regions, except for the cyber corridor. North Luzon Agribusiness Quadrangle Metro Luzon Urban Beltway Central Philippines Mindanao

=== North Luzon Agribusiness Quadrangle ===
- Ilocos Region
- Cordillera Administrative Region
- Cagayan Valley
- northern portion of northern provinces of Central Luzon
  - Aurora (north of Baler)
  - Nueva Ecija (north of Cabanatuan)
  - Tarlac (north of Tarlac City)
  - Zambales (north of Subic)

=== Metro Luzon Urban Beltway ===
or simply Luzon Urban Beltway.

- the rest of Central Luzon
  - Aurora (south of Baler, including Baler)
  - Bataan
  - Bulacan
  - Nueva Ecija (south of Cabanatuan, including Cabanatuan)
  - Pampanga
  - Tarlac (south of Tarlac City, including Tarlac)
  - Zambales (south of Subic, including Subic and Olongapo)
- National Capital Region
- Calabarzon
- Mimaropa (excluding the provinces of Palawan and Romblon)
  - Marinduque
  - Occidental Mindoro
  - Oriental Mindoro

=== Central Philippines Region ===
also known as Tourism Super Region.

- the rest of Mimaropa
  - Romblon
  - Palawan
- Bicol Region
- Western Visayas
- Negros Island Region
- Central Visayas
- Eastern Visayas
- Northern Mindanao
  - Camiguin
- Caraga
  - Siargao

The Tourism Super Region is a concept of development plan of the government. Under this concept, the government intends to focus development and investments on tourism related projects. This super region is actually a cluster of five regions plus some parts of Caraga. It boasts of a wide stretch of beachline, surfing spots, caves, lakes, and historical sites.

Included in the plan is building infrastructure such as airports, roll-on-roll-off seaports, bus terminals and hotels. Aside from Mactan–Cebu International Airport, the government intends to build international airports in each component region. The Bohol–Panglao International Airport in Bohol in Central Visayas and the Bicol International Airport in Daraga, Albay for the Bicol Region has opened in 2018 and 2021, respectively, while the unutilized Guiuan Airport in Guiuan, Eastern Samar is being planned to be converted into an international airport for Eastern Visayas region. The Kalibo International Airport in Aklan is now open to international flights from Incheon, South Korea due to increasing Korean tourists flocking to Boracay Island. The Bacolod–Silay International Airport in Silay is designated to serve Negros Occidental and Negros Oriental, while the new Iloilo International Airport in Cabatuan, Iloilo, is designated as the international airport for Panay Island together with Kalibo Airport.

=== Mindanao Super Region ===
also known as Agribusiness Mindanao Super Region.

- Zamboanga Peninsula
- Northern Mindanao (except for Camiguin)
- Davao Region
- Soccsksargen
- Caraga (except for Siargao)
- Bangsamoro Autonomous Region in Muslim Mindanao

=== Cyber corridor ===
A "cyber corridor' traverses the above super regions from Baguio to Cebu City to Davao City.

== See also ==
- Regions of the Philippines
- Economy of the Philippines
