= Ramon H. Lopez =

Filipino painter (born 1983)

Ramon H. Lopez (born February 1983) in San Jose, Nueva Ecija, is a Filipino painter and artist known for using rust as medium for his painting.

== Career ==
He uses indigenous materials such as rust as his medium. He started to collect rusting objects from trash, carefully segregating the rust particles which he uses for his art works. He decided to become a rust painter and plans to create more artistic works in the future. He is assured that his works will pass the test of times since he puts top coats in all his works.
