= San Jose City National High School =

Public high school in Nueva Ecija, Philippines

- Mataas na Paaralang ng Lungsod ng San Jose (Filipino)

Location
- Cardenas Street, Brgy. Calaocan; San Jose, Nueva Ecija; Philippines
- 15°47′10″N 120°59′27″E

Information
- Type: State-owned, public institution
- Established: 1944
- Principal: Dr. Jocelyn T. Leonardo
- Grades: 7 to 12
- Campus: 80,000 m^{2} (860,000 sq ft)
- Colors: Green and White
- Affiliations: DepEd Region III

The San Jose City National High School (Filipino: Mataas na Paaralan ng Lungsod ng San Jose) is a public secondary school in San Jose, Nueva Ecija, Philippines, was established in 1944 with 321 students enrolled and with only a few teachers. Classes in those times were held in makeshift rooms constructed of bamboo and talahib. Other classes were conducted in unoccupied first floors of residential homes. Through the cooperative efforts of the Parents Teachers Association (PTA) and the community, an eight hectare lot was acquired and purchased through funds they were able to raise. Quonset huts made of cogon used by the Americans as barracks were used as temporary rooms. A warehouse made of sawali (woven split bamboo mats) and GI sheets inside the campus was also converted into classrooms.

The school was formerly named North Provincial High School and later Constancio Padilla National High School, when the town of San Jose was converted into a chartered city on August 10, 1969, the North Provincial High School became San Jose City High School. By virtue of Batas Pambansa Bilang 261 authored by Assemblyman Narciso S. Nario, the school was nationalized and named San Jose City National High School which was approved on November 13, 1982. The following year, Assemblyman Leopoldo Diaz passed a Bill Batas Pambansa Bilang 650 changing its name to Constancio Padilla National High School, in honor of Constancio Padilla, former congressman of Nueva Ecija and a member of the First Congress of the Republic of the Philippines. On November 9, 2015, the Sangguniang Panlungsod of San Jose City passed Ordinance No. 15-130 renaming/reverting the school's name to San Jose City National High School.

It has Science Technology and Engineering (STE) program, Special Program in the Arts (SPA), and Regular Classes, it also has the Special Program in Foreign Language (SPFL) and Special Program in Journalism (SPJ). The school also offers Special Needs Education (SNEd) and Open High School Program (OHSP).

== History ==
Constancio Padilla National High School was established in 1944. Classes were held in makeshift classrooms constructed of bamboo and talahib. Other classes were conducted in unoccupied first floors of residential homes. Through the cooperative efforts of the parents, teachers and the community, an eight hectare lot was acquired and purchased through funds they were able to raise. Quonset huts made of cogon used by the Americans as barracks were used as temporary rooms. A warehouse made of sawali and GI sheets inside the campus was converted into classrooms.

When the school was founded, it was named North Provincial High School. When the town was converted into a chartered City, it became San Jose City High School. By virtue of B.P. Blg. 261 authored by Assemblyman Narciso Nario, the school was nationalized and named San Jose City National High School which was approved on November 13, 1982. The following year, Assemblyman Leopoldo Diaz passed another Bill changing its name to Constancio Padilla National High School which is still being used up to the present.

A tremendous facelift was made in the early 1990s. Many buildings were erected through the efforts of the school officials. Buildings were given by the national government through the efforts of alumni members who became a national figure. The rest were donated by the local government and foreign grants.

== Community linkages ==
The school works harmoniously with the officials of the local government and the NGO's. The Sangguniang Panglungsod passed an Ordinance through the DENR requiring the graduating students to plant at least 6 seedling/trees in a designated area. Student government participate in the activities of the city during the observance of Linggo ng Kabataan where the students are given the chance to experience running the government.

CPNHS also enjoins the PTA in the school programs. PTA serves as the partner of the school in the realization of the school's programs and projects. Aside from the Parent Teachers Association, the school also received support from the barangay and Local Government Unit (LGU). They play a great role in the educational needs of today's youth through their financial and package grants for the school's growing population.

Another partner of the school is the alumni association. They organized homecoming, donated projects like school buildings and other facilities and pledges support in all undertakings.

== Community relations ==
- Cleanliness and beautification campaigns
- Tree planting programs supported by the school.
- Boy/Girl City Officials during Linggo ng Kabataan
- Sports tournament participated by students and out-of-school youth.
- Citizens Drug Watch – campaign for anti-drug abuse monitored by the local government
- SADAC (School Anti-Drug Abuse Campaign) and CADAC (City Anti-Drug Abuse Campaign) are organized by the students in support to the government's drive on anti-drug abuse.
- Library is open to the community (School library is also called Community Library)

== Special programs ==
- 4Ts is a special remedial program for the non-readers and non-numerates which is observed weekly
- DepEd Youth Formation Groups:
- Supreme Secondary Learner Government – Students exercise suffrage and elect the officers through secret ballot on election days. Student government run the student affairs.
- Barkada Kontra Droga - formerly known as School Anti-Drug Abuse Council, Barkada Kontra Droga is a peer-oriented organization which aims to raise awareness of various forms of harmful substances and substance abuses.
- Youth for Environment in Schools Organization (YES-O) - a group of learners who advance environmental advocacies in school.
- Project WATCH (We Advocate Time Consciousness and Honesty) - a group of learners that serve as disciplinaries, making sure that timeliness and honesty are well-observed in school in terms of attendance in flag raising and classrooms; They also employ various activities to raise awareness of timely and important events in the country.
- Campus Journalism – campus journalists in SJCNHS work in The Grain, the Official Student Publication of San Jose City National High School. The said publication not only develop press conference-performing students, but most importantly, students who are proactive members of the society, effecting change. In the same manner, the school now offers Special Program in Journalism, a section exclusive for students who specialize in journalistic endeavors.
- Sining Kanlungang Lino Brocka (SiKLAB) - named after National Artist Catalino Brocka, who grew up in San Jose City, Sining Kanlungang Lino Brocka serves as a community that nurtures the artistic talents of San Jose City National High School's students. The school also offers Special Program in the Arts, a section that exclusively practices arts in six disciplines (dance, music, theater, media arts, creative writing, and visual arts).
- Scouting Activities – Boy and Girl Scouts are given the opportunity to join the Scouting activities to augment character building programs.
- Athletic Events – Intramurals Games; Division Athletic Meets, etc., one-day leagues, and even laro ng lahi events are participated in by the students. Just this years, two sections have been opened to house students with athletic prowess. This is to ensure that our athletes are well-identified and contained, and are prepared rigorously for any athletic competitions.
- Convocations – held on special holidays with guest speakers to highlight the occasion.
- Implementation of government trusts
- Teachers sportsfest sponsored by the Faculty & Staff Club of the school.
- Alumni Homecoming are celebrated by batches; the Grand Alumni Homecoming happens every three years

== Curricular programs ==
- Science, Technology, and Engineering (STE) - an exclusive program that specializes in sciences, research, and development.
- Special Program in Foreign Language (SPFL) - the program teaches a foreign language to a section of learners. Moreover, the students also learn a certain nation's culture and arts. In San Jose City National High School, Chinese Mandarin is the language offered.
- Special Program in the Arts (SPA) - the said program develops a learner's artistic talents. It offers six disciplines: dance, music, theater arts, media arts, creative writing, and visual arts
- Special Program in Journalism (SPJ) - this program focuses on journalism and the attitude, skills, and knowledge related to it. The said program has been running for two years now.
- Special Needs Education Program (SNED) - a program intended to nurture learners who are disabled. Here, they learn more than just sign language, but how to navigate the world with their unique and awesome characteristics.

SUBJECTS OFFERED

- LANGUAGE: English and Filipino
- "Study of Society: Social Studies
- Math, Science & Technology: Mathematics, Biology, Physics, Chemistry
- Technology & Livelihood Education: Cookery, Agriculture, Beauty Care, Automotive, and ICT
- Edukasyon sa Pagpapakatao: Personality Development, DepEd Core Values (Makadiyos, Makakalikasan, Makatao, at Makabansa)
- MAPEH: Music, Arts, Physical Education, and Health
