= Tanduyong Festival =

Annual harvest festival in Nueva Ecija, Philippines

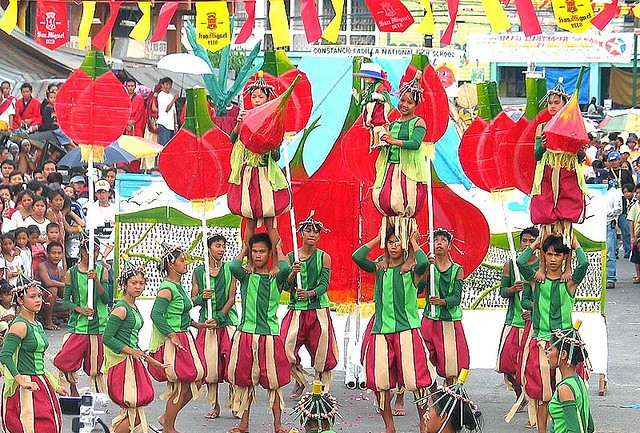
- Observed by: San Jose, Nueva Ecija, Philippines
- Type: Religious
- Date: Fourth Sunday in April
- 2024 date: April 28
- 2025 date: April 27
- 2026 date: April 26
- 2027 date: April 25
- Frequency: annual

Tanduyong Festival is an annual harvest festival in San Jose City in the province of Nueva Ecija, the largest province in Central Luzon, Philippines. The festival takes its name from a variety of shallot grown in the region.

== Background ==
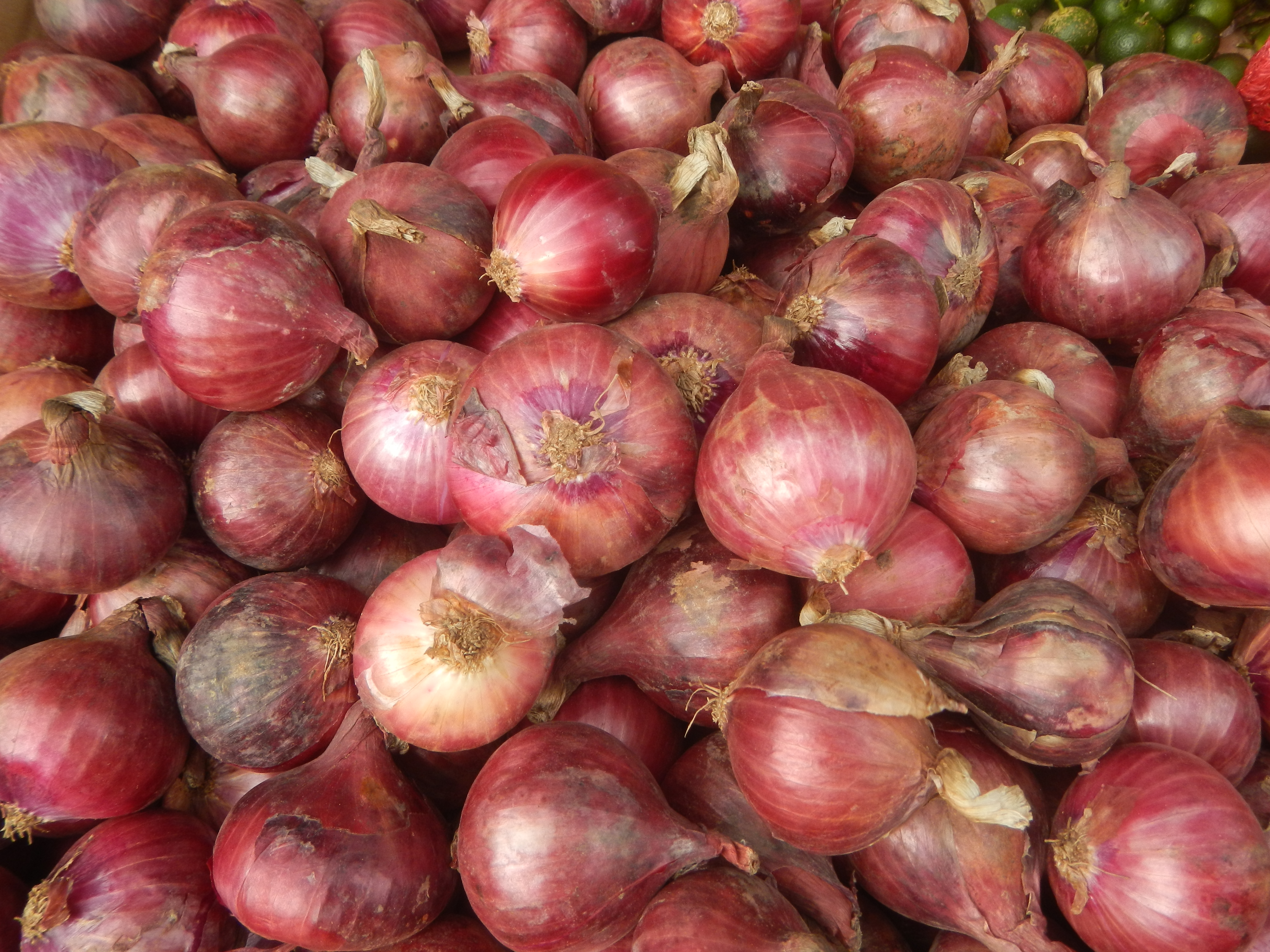
Bunch of onions

Nueva Ecija is a historic province in the Philippines with colorful and remarkable festivals. This province, with five cities and 27 municipalities, has diverse cultural traditions that became significant part of Novo Ecijanos culture and tradition. San Jose City is a second class city in the province of Nueva Ecija. It is the northernmost city of the province. According to the 2000 census, it has a population of 108,254 in 23,191 households.

Before the city was founded by the Spaniards, it is known as Kabaritan, named for the plant commonly seen in the area. With its wide plains, agriculture is the main source of livelihood in the city. It is part of the rice granary of the Philippines. But the agricultural produce of the city also includes vegetables, fruits and onions. It is now a leading producer of onions in the country. Every year, the Tanduyong festival is held on April coinciding with the annual fiesta to celebrate this. Tanduyong is a variety of shallot grown in the area.

== The festival ==
San Jose City prides itself as the "Onion Capital of the Philippines" and is a leading producer of onion, garlic, rice and vegetables. Every year, on the fourth Sunday of April, the people of San Jose dance through the main street in a colorful, enchanting celebration of the blessing of the harvest. On festival day, the streets are filled with contingents of dancers outfitted in striking, multi-hued native costumes. Exotic rhythms of improvised musical instruments fill the air as the dancers gyrate and sway to the beat of life. Special activities included are: beauty contest, tourism and trade fair, awarding ceremony and cultural shows.
