= Core Gateway College =

Private college in Nueva Ecija, Philippines

Core Gateway College, Inc.
- Former name: Colleges of the Republic
- Established: 1948
- Affiliations: Commission on Higher Education (Philippines)
- President: Dr. Danilo S. Vargas
- Location: San Jose City, Nueva Ecija, Philippines; 15°47′27″N 120°59′20″E
- Colors: Green
- Location in Nueva Ecija Location in Luzon Location in the Philippines

Core Gateway College, Inc., formerly Colleges of the Republic, is a community college in San Jose City, Nueva Ecija, Philippines. The college was founded by Dr. Anacleto E. Agaton in February 1948. The College was renamed Core Gateway College, Inc.

== Brief history ==
The Colleges of the Republic was established in 1948 as part of the post-war rebuilding effort in the town of San Jose, Nueva Ecija. The institution has served San Jose City and its surrounding communities for over seventy eight years.

== Courses offered ==
=== School of Graduate Studies ===
- Master of Arts in Education
- Majors in: Filipino, Education Management, Guidance and Counseling, Mathematics Education
- Master of Arts in Public Administration

=== College Department ===
- Bachelor of Secondary Education
- Majors in: Social Studies, Filipino, English, Mathematics
- Bachelor of Elementary Education
- Bachelor of Business Administration
- Majors in: Management Accounting and Business Management
- Bachelor of Arts in Political Science
- Bachelor of Science in Computer Science

=== Basic Education ===
- High School
- Elementary
- Pre-Elementary
