= San Jose, Nueva Ecija =

Component city in Nueva Ecija, Philippines

San Jose
- Component city
- City of San Jose
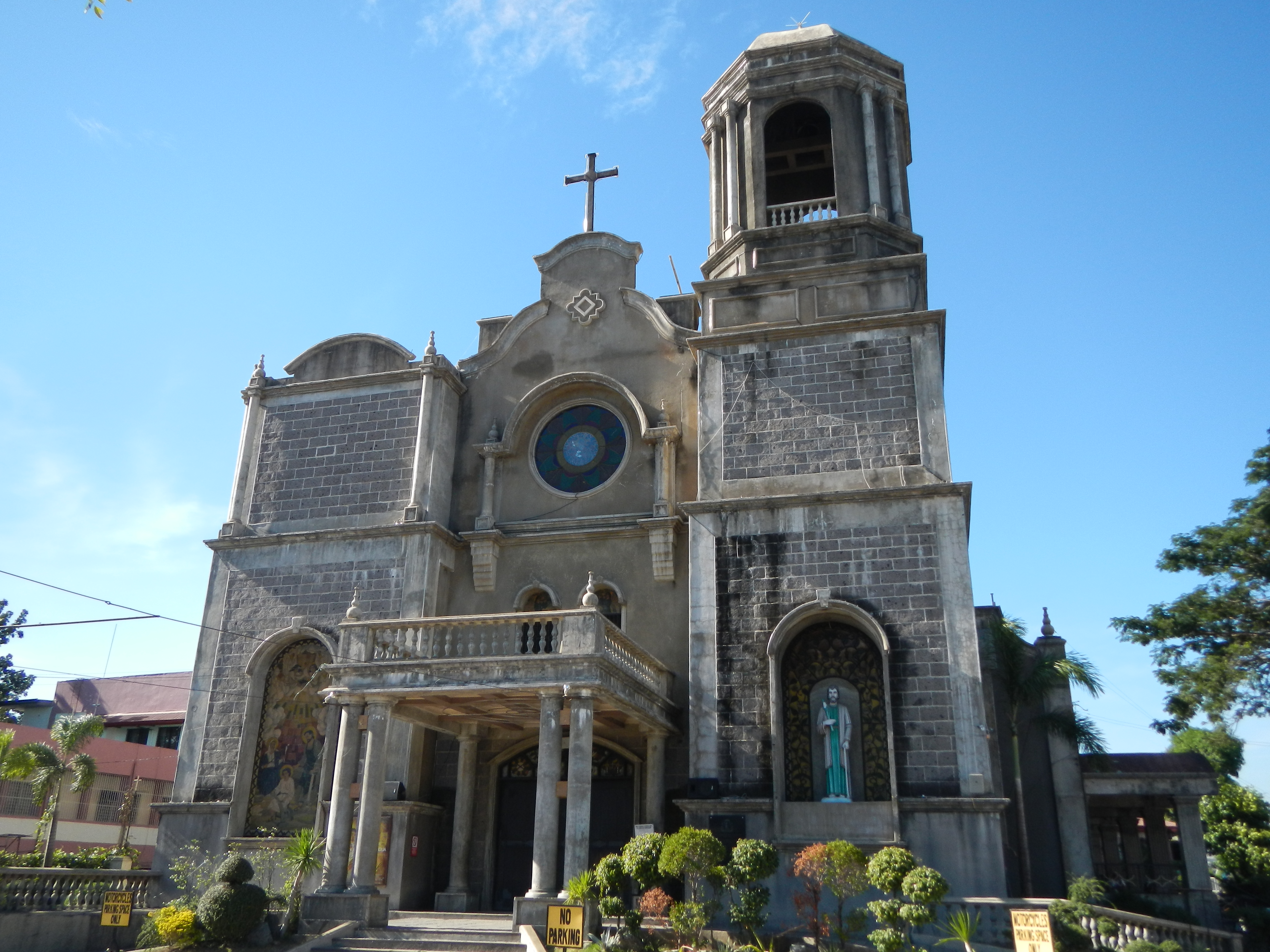
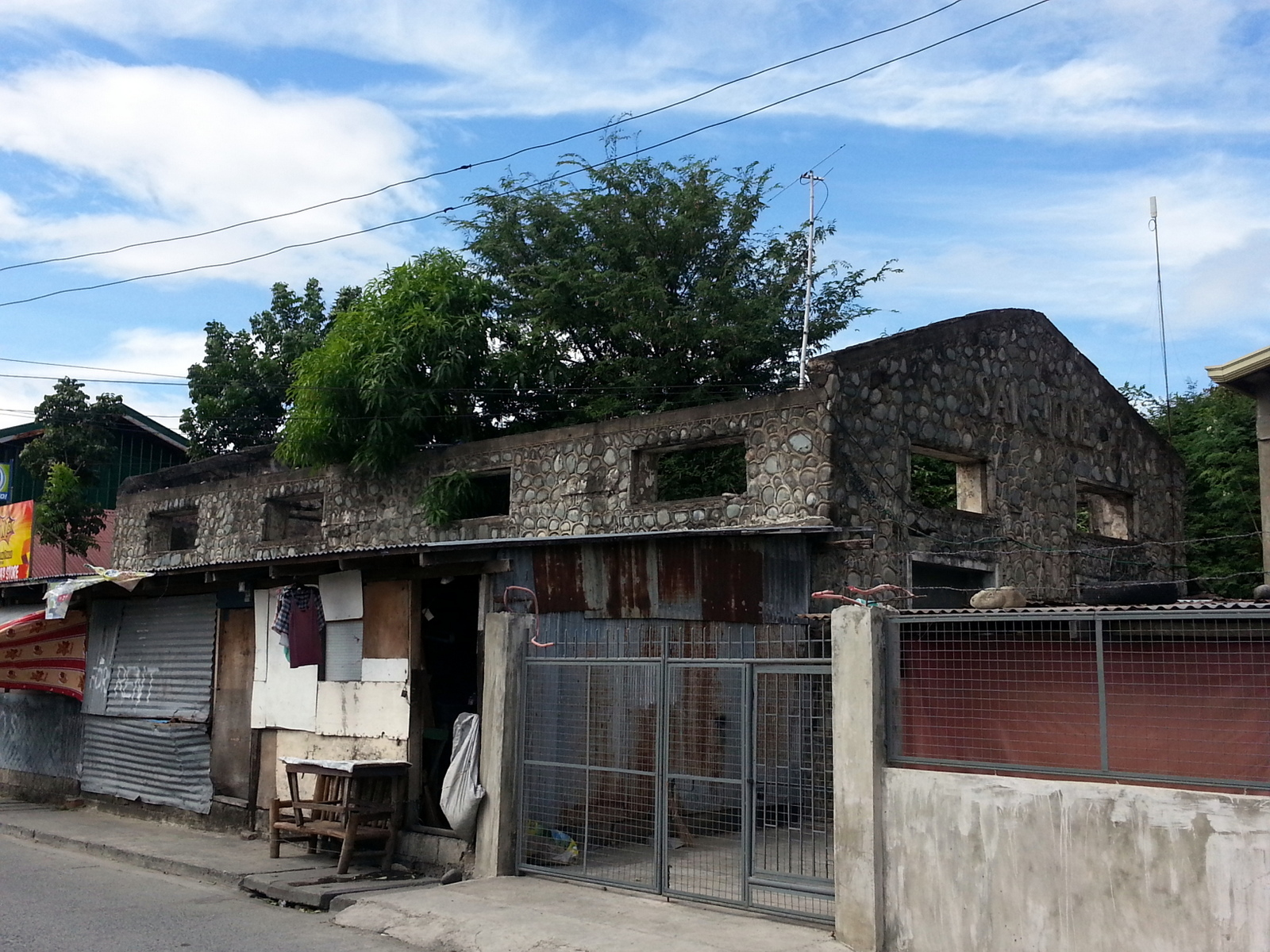
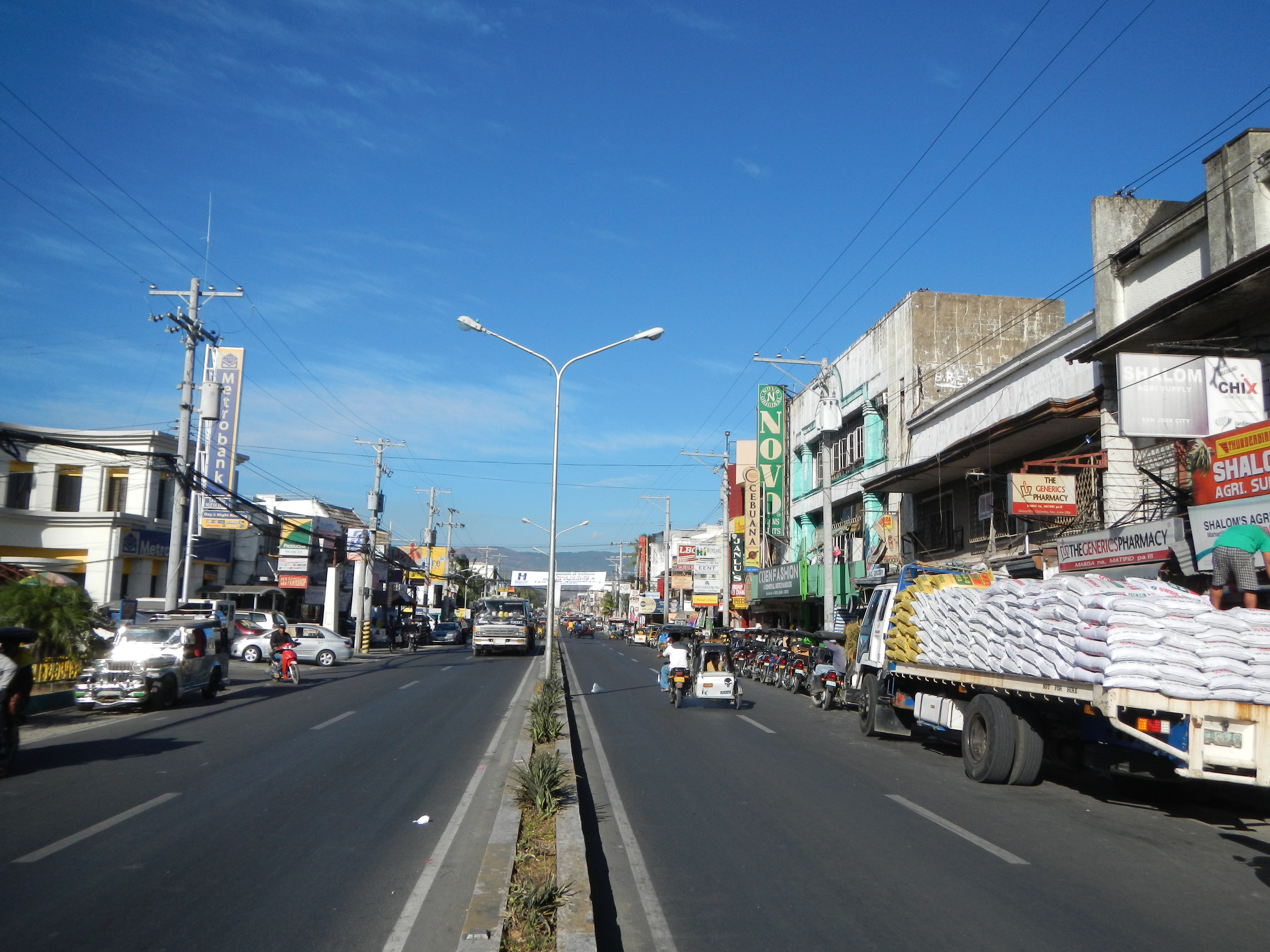
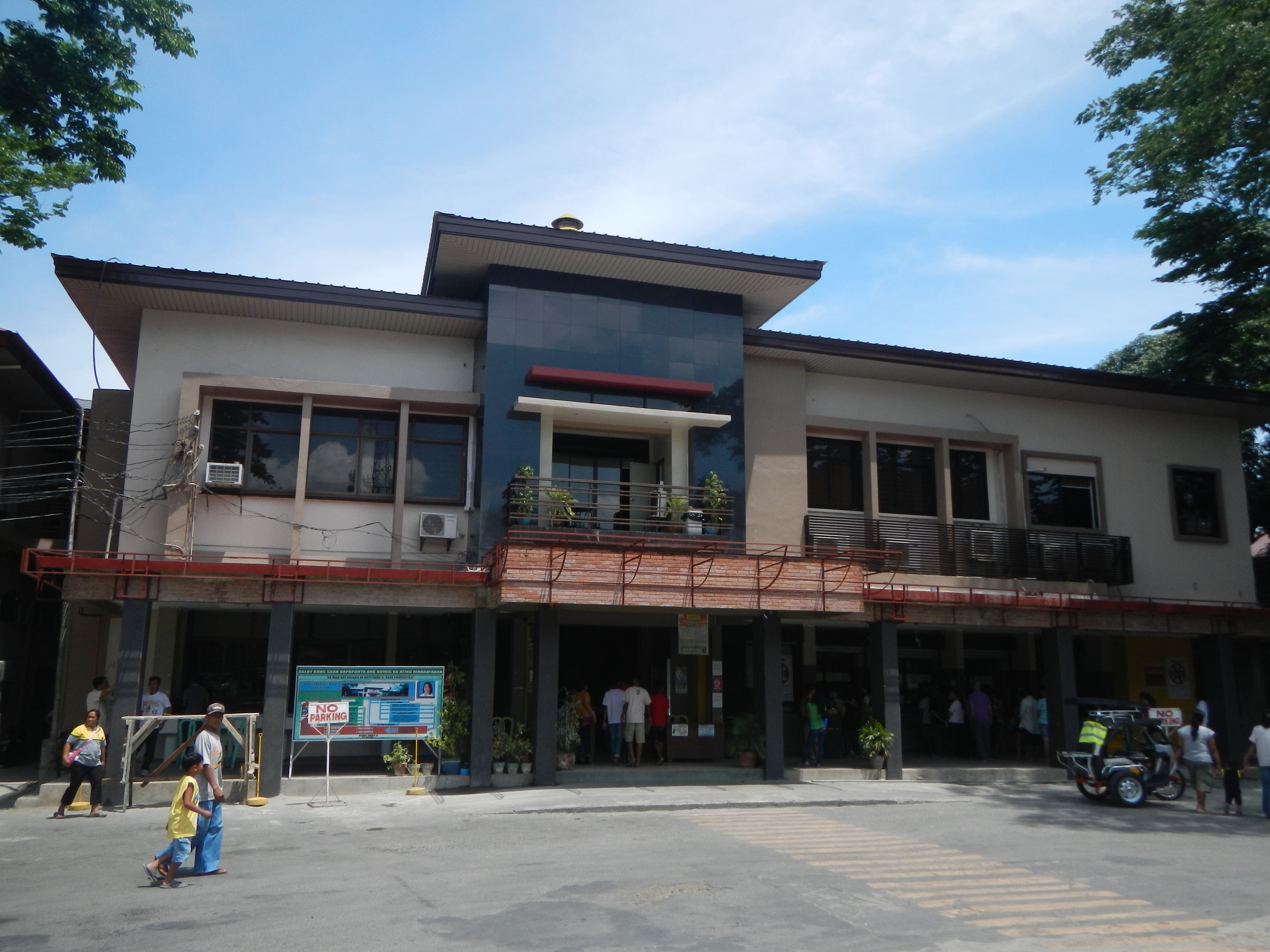
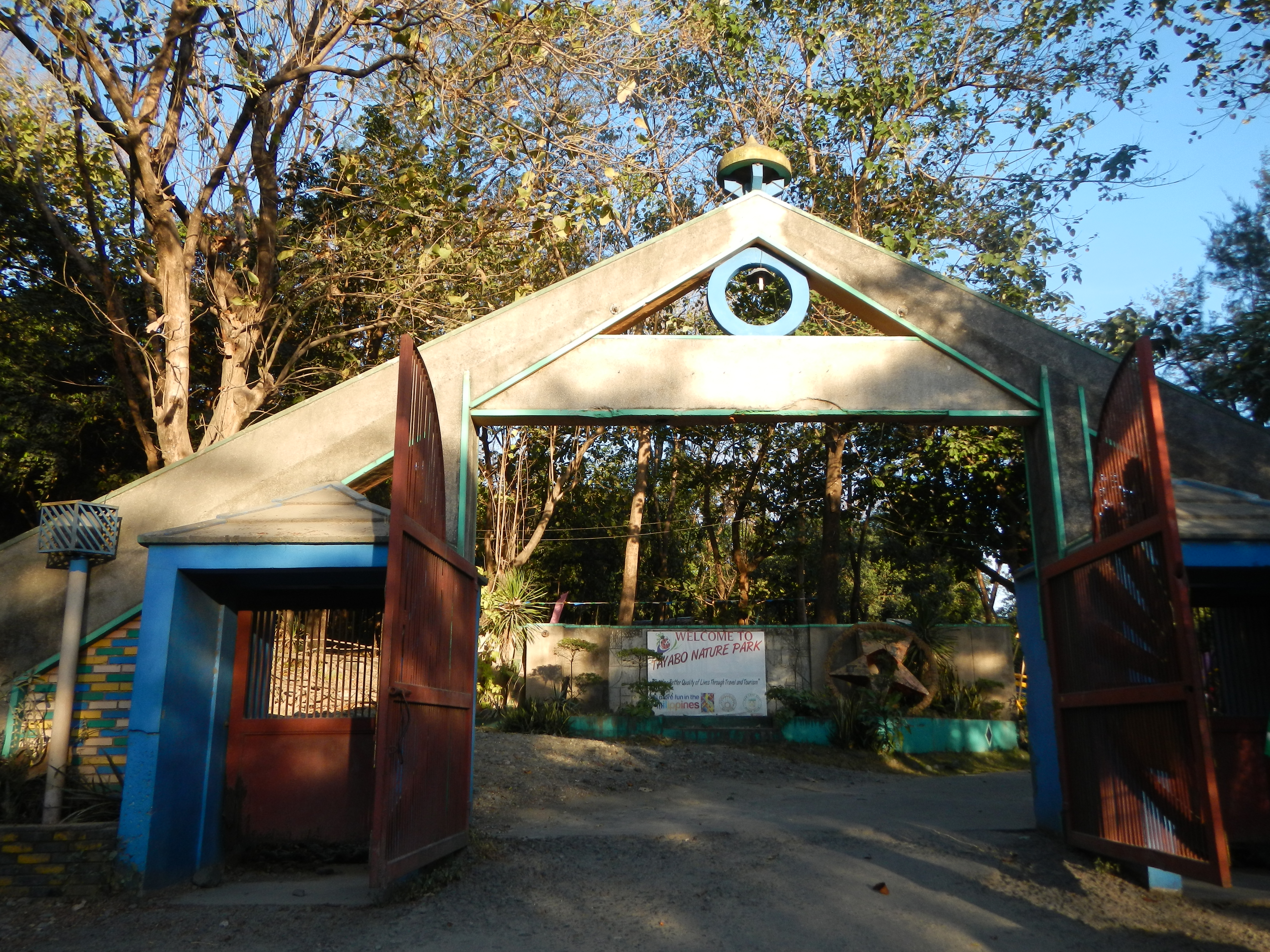
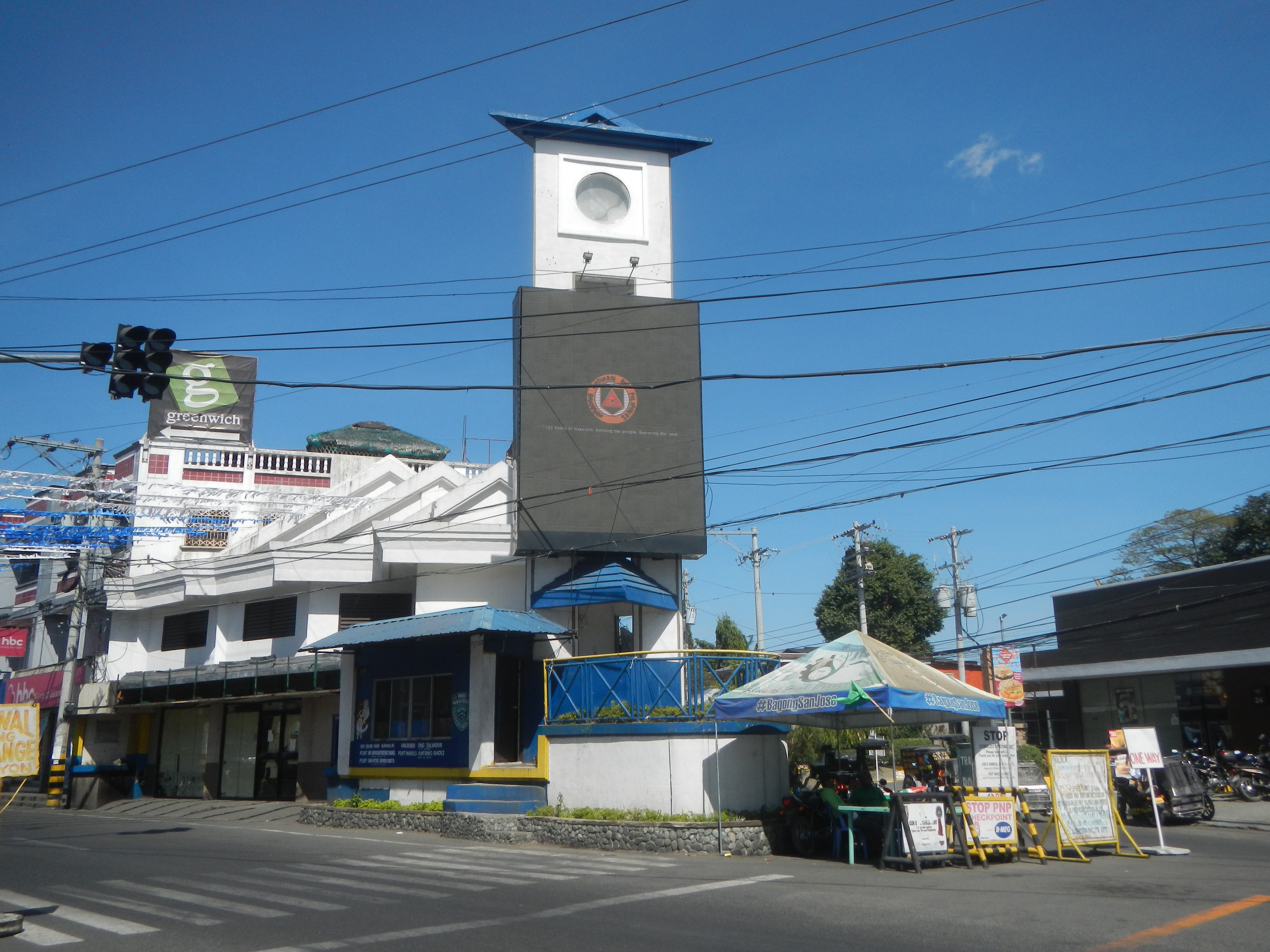
- From top, left to right: Saint Joseph the Worker Cathedral Parish • Old Philippine National Railway Station • Poblacion • San Jose City Hall • Tayabo Nature Park • San Jose City Clock Tower)

- Seal
- Nicknames: Christmas Capital of Nueva Ecija, Rice Granary of Nueva Ecija
- Anthem: San Jose Hymn (Filipino: Himno ng San Jose)
- Map of Nueva Ecija with San Jose highlighted
- Interactive map of San Jose
- Location within the Philippines
- Coordinates: 15°48′13.32″N 120°59′56.76″E
- Country: Philippines
- Region: Central Luzon
- Province: Nueva Ecija
- District: 2nd district
- Founded: March 19, 1894
- Cityhood: August 4, 1969
- Named for: St. Joseph
- Barangays: 38 (see Barangays)

Government
  - Type: Sangguniang Panlungsod
  - Mayor: Josel F. Violago
  - Vice Mayor: Evangel Shalom S. Manugue
  - Representative: Mario O. Salvador
  - City Council: Members: Glenda Macadangdang; Mary Eleanor Villena; Atty. Ronald Lee Hortizuela; Edward John Divina; Andrei Benedict Ignacio; Dr. Arturo Vittorio Donayre III; Jennifer Salvador; Manuel Chua; Banjo Munar; Carina Clarizze Munsayac
  - Electorate: 103,753 voters (2025)

Area
  - Total: 185.99 km^{2} (71.81 sq mi)
- Elevation: 184 m (604 ft)
- Highest elevation: 1,410 m (4,630 ft)
- Lowest elevation: 38 m (125 ft)

Population (2024 census)
  - Total: 156,714
  - Density: 842.59/km^{2} (2,182.3/sq mi)
  - Households: 37,243

Economy
  - Income class: 2nd city income class
  - Poverty incidence: 11.97% (2023)
  - Revenue: ₱ 1,683 million (2024)
  - Assets: ₱ 4,482 million (2024)
  - Expenditure: ₱ 1,375 million (2024)
  - Liabilities: ₱ 937.7 million (2024)

Service provider
  - Electricity: San Jose City Electric Cooperative (SAJELCO)
- Time zone: UTC+8 (PST)
- ZIP code: 3121
- PSGC: 034926000
- IDD : area code: +63 (0)44
- Native languages: Ilocano; Tagalog
- Website: www.sjc.gov.ph

San Jose, officially the City of San Jose (Filipino: Lungsod ng San Jose; Ilocano: Siudad ti San Jose; Pangasinan: Siyudad na San Jose), is a component city in the province of Nueva Ecija, Philippines. According to the 2024 census, it has a population of 156,714 people, making it the second most populous city in Nueva Ecija after Cabanatuan, and a key urban center in the northern part of the province.

== Etymology ==
The town got its name after Saint Joseph, the patron saint of the place.

Before the city was founded by the Spanish colonizers, it is known as Kabaritan, named after the plant barit commonly seen in the area.

== History ==
Years before it became a town, San Jose was a wilderness and a veritable hunting ground of the inhabitants of its neighboring towns. The earliest inhabitants were known as Negritos (Baluga) headed by Kapitan Danding, a Negrito convert to Christianity residing in Pinagcuartelan. These early inhabitants depended mostly on hunting and fishing for their livelihood. Some hunters from the neighboring towns considered San Jose to be a good place for settlers due to its wide and uncleared agricultural land. The first group of settlers made some clearings (kaingin) on the outskirts of the present town.

Originally, San Jose was a part of the town of Puncan, but later on, because of its nearness to Lupao, it was made a barrio of the latter. The early history of this town was coupled with the early history of Puncan and Lupao. Formerly, San Jose was known as a barrio of "Kabaritan", referring to the barit, an Ilocano term for a plant related to rattan and was abundant in the place.

=== Spanish colonial era ===
On March 19, 1894, San Jose became a full-fledged town, with an interim government headed by a capitán municipal. Kabaritan was separated from Lupao and renamed after Saint Joseph, its patron saint.

The local official was also converted from a Teniente Absoluto to a Capitán Municipal, the first one being Canuto Ramos, who served from 1894 to 1898. One of his remarkable achievements was the construction of an irrigation system which was later acquired and enlarged by the government (now the Talavera River Irrigation System), covering vast rice fields as far as Muñoz and Talavera.

Several years before the Philippine Revolution, Ilocanos from the Ilocandia and parts of Nueva Ecija, especially the towns of Santo Domingo, Muñoz and Lupao, as well as Pangasinenses of Pangasinan and northern Tarlac, Tagalogs (including Batangueños) and Kapampangans, settled the forest of Kabaritan, and cleared its wilderness. It was from this time that growth of the town began.

=== American era ===
When the Revolution broke out and upon the surrender of the Spanish forces in 1898, a revolutionary government was set up in San Jose. The town remained as such until the establishment of local government under the Americans in 1901.

San Jose under the American Regime became a progressive town. Its inhabitants enjoyed more political, economic, intellectual and religious rights than before. This was due to the establishment of various schools, churches, public buildings and the construction of roads and bridges, which hastened the progress of the town.

From 1898 to 1900, the Philippines was placed under an American military government. In this period, José Cardenas was appointed Capitán Municipal and under him, the town saw the appointment of new officials, planning, and the establishment of new subsidiary settlements.

The second Capitán Municipal under the American military government (1900–1901) was Celestino Javalde, who continued the plotting of new settlements and construction of roads in the población.

When United States replaced military rule with the civilian Insular Government, Cornelio Ramos was appointed Capitán Municipal. He continued the roadworks in the población and aided the construction of irrigation canals leading to the different barrios of San Jose.

In 1904, Filipinos were given more rights and freedom in choosing government officials, with an election held. The first to be electer Municipal President in place of a Capitán Municipal was Crisanto Sánchez (1904–1906). He continued road construction projects, named streets in the población, and appointed lower municipal officials.

Celestino Javalde returned to govern the town as an elected Municipal President, serving from 1906 to 1908. With the help of his vice-president and other municipal officials, he focused on land reform, which paved the way for equal distribution of property.

The Municipal President-elect of 1908–1910, Valerio Escobar concentrated on the construction of roads from Sibut to San Agustin. He also founded the barrios of Santa Barbara and Kapisungan (now Bagong Sikat).

Desiderio de Guzmán was elected in 1910 and served till 1912. He had many achievements but among all these, he paid more attention to the improvements of records in the población.

Under Municipal President Agapito Kurameng, (1912–1916), he initiated the construction of a concrete elementary school building (Gabaldon building) which now comprises one of the central buildings of San Jose West Elementary School. The improvement of roads, and expropriation of lots for the Municipal Hall and the Public Market were among his other achievements.

The construction of the Municipal building and the construction of more roads leading to the barrios were launched by Gregorio Cadhit (1916–1919). He was re-elected to office from 1919 to 1922, and in his second term he initiated construction of part of the public market.

As years went by, the town developed such that there was a need for more public improvements and building constructions for the welfare of the populace. To meet these demands, the newly elected Municipal President Rafael Rueda and Municipal Vice-president Estanislao Arquero with the help of other municipal officials put up a Puericulture Center and a Municipal Nursery from 1922 to 1925. A second building for the public market was also constructed. Telephone lines connecting the población to all barrios were installed. A road to Kalbarito (now Palestina) was constructed, as was further road improvement.

Raymundo Eugenio was elected Municipal President for the period from 1925 to 1928. A third building for the public market was constructed and more construction of roads, especially those leading to Andres Bonifacio, were put underway.

In 1928–1931, Apolonio Pascual and Vice-president Victorino Villar were instrumental in putting up the fourth building for the public market and the municipal dispensary. More improvement of roads leading to the barrios was also done.

Raymundo Eugenio was re-elected to office, and served from 1931 to 1934 with Vice-president Ladislao Bunag. Eugenio was called the road-building President of San Jose because of his efforts in the construction of many roads especially leading to the barrios of Bagong Bayan, Porais, Tondod, and Andres Bonifacio.

Apolonio Pascual was re-elected for the 1934–1937 term. Dimas Tomás was his Vice-president. Changes in 1935 upon the establishment of the Philippine Commonwealth marked the transition of the heads of the municipal government to be known as the Alcalde and Vice-Alcalde. Aside from the construction of more roads, the barrios of Patacla (now San Francisco) and A. Pascual were founded. The waterworks that provide the people of San Jose with drinking water was constructed and installed. The home economics building of San Jose Central School was also constructed.

Alcalde Pedro del Pilar and Vice-Alcalde Severino Bautista, under the Commonwealth government, established the town’s buying stations for NARIC (National Rice and Corn, a predecessor agency of the modern National Food Authority). This was during their term of office from 1937 to 1940, and they were re-elected for the 1940–1942 term. As a continuation of their policies, the improvement of roads was continued.

=== Japanese occupation ===
Upon the outbreak of World War II on December 8, 1941, San Jose became an evacuation center for refugees from neighboring provinces especially those from Manila and its suburbs. The town was bombed by two Japanese planes on December 23, 1941. The terrified populace, who suffered heavy casualties, fled to the remotest barrios of San Jose, while a provisional government operated in the barrio of Porais under Basílio Durán as Mayor, appointed by the military forces of the Commonwealth Government. This provisional local government existed only briefly due to the arrival of the Japanese Imperial Forces on January 26, 1942, who then established a rival provisional government with Matías Bautista as Mayor. After his refusal to cooperate, the Japanese replaced him with Anastacio Bascos. Engr. Casimiro Panajon succeeded him, but was later murdered by the Japanese for non-collaboration with them and his guerrilla activities.

During the Liberation of the Philippines in 1945, Anselmo Patacsil, Pedro del Pilar and Basílio Durán were appointed in succession as Mayors by the Philippine Civil Affairs Unit (PCAU). Each served for a short period from 1945 to 1946, working to re-organise the municipal government in cooperation with the PCAU. They helped in the establishment of emergency hospitals, the North Provincial High School, and the re-opening of elementary schools.

=== Philippine independence ===
After Philippine independence in July 1946, Alfonso Villamar was elected Mayor with Paulino Margarejo as his Vice-Mayor (1947–1951). Among their achievements were the maintenance of evacuees, a pacification campaign, rehabilitation of devastated government buildings, the establishment of a fire department and a municipal library, and the improvement of roads.

==== Creation of Llanera ====
In 1954, the barrios of Bagumbayan (townsite), Andres Bonifacio, Caridad, San Mauricio (portion), Parang Manga (portion), Santa Barbara, Floridablanca, Gomez, San Francisco, and Victoria were separated to form the town of Llanera along with some territories excised from Talavera and Rizal.

=== Cityhood ===
On August 4, 1969, by virtue of Republic Act 6051, San Jose was converted into a city, making it as the third city in Nueva Ecija after Cabanatuan and Palayan.

== Demographics ==
Population census of San Jose
Year	Pop.	±% p.a.
1903	3,744	—
1918	15,592	+9.98%
1939	28,666	+2.94%
1948	33,017	+1.58%
1960	38,078	+1.20%
1970	70,314	+6.32%
1975	58,387	−3.66%
1980	64,254	+1.93%
1990	82,836	+2.57%
1995	96,860	+2.97%
2000	108,254	+2.41%
2007	122,353	+1.70%
2010	129,424	+2.07%
2015	139,738	+1.47%
2020	150,917	+1.63%
2024	156,714	+0.91%
Source: Philippine Statistics Authority

=== Languages ===
Spoken languages in San Jose City
Languages	percentage
Tagalog	72.1%
Pangasinense	10.2%
Ilocano	9.2%
Others	8%

The current population of San Jose City is 156,714 people in 23,191 households as of May 2024. The majority language used is Tagalog, more than 72 percent of the population speak it as their native tongue, followed by Ilocano, Kapampangan, and Pangasinense.

=== Religion ===
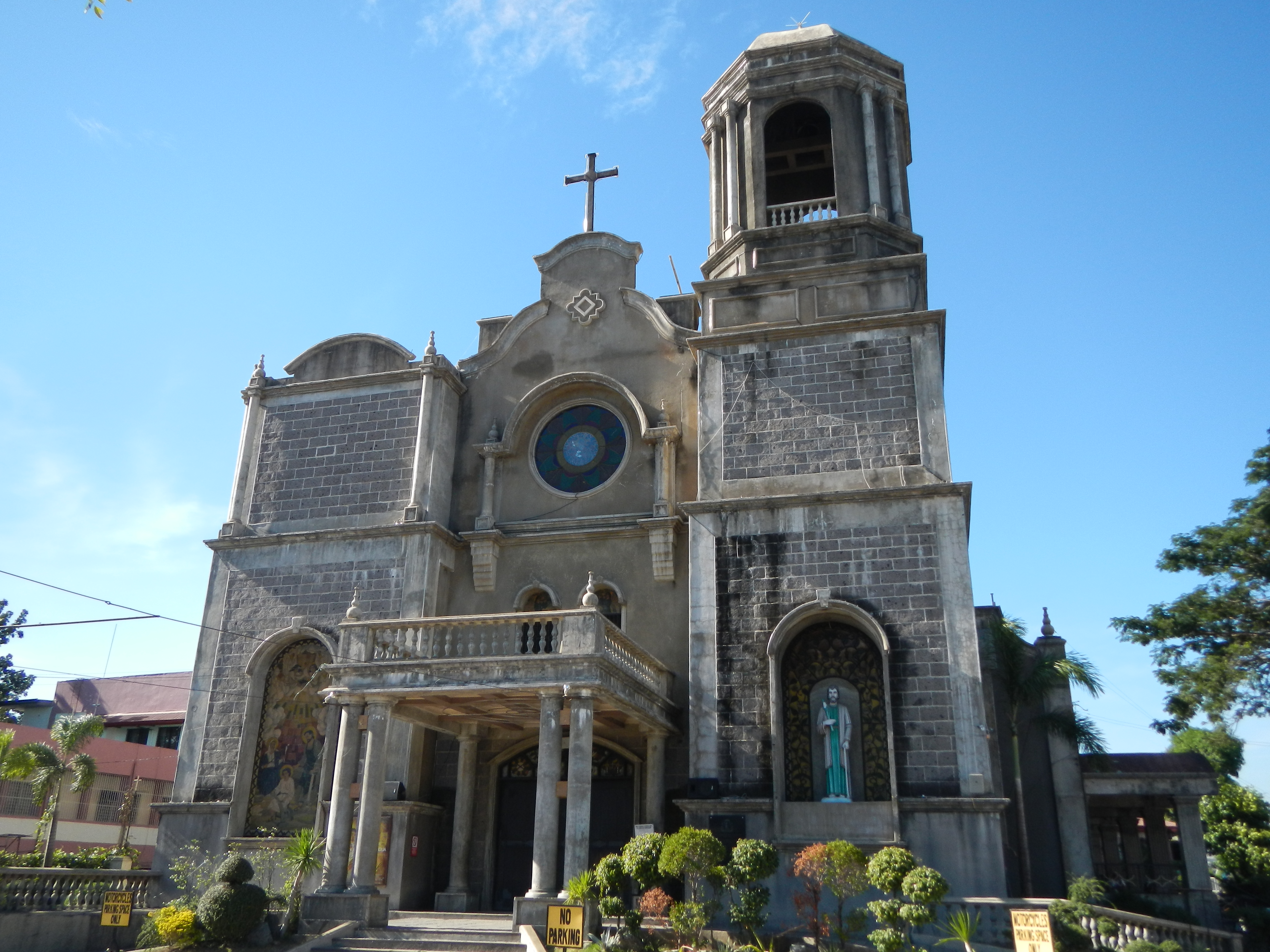
Cathedral of Saint Joseph the Worker

On February 16, 1984, the Diocese of San Jose was created by Pope John Paul II. The creation of the new diocese bisected the province horizontally into the Diocese of Cabanatuan in the south, and the Diocese of San Jose in the north, both the suffragans of the Archdiocese of Lingayen–Dagupan. 80% of the city residents are Catholics and the patron saint is Saint Joseph. The feast is celebrated every March 19 annually. The diocese now has 17 parishes administered by 22 priests working under one bishop. Among its Catholic institutions are 9 high schools, 4 elementary schools, 6 kindergarten schools, 1 diocesan catechetical center, and the Don Bosco Training Center.

== Geography ==
San Jose City is 43 kilometres (27 mi) from Cabanatuan, 57 kilometers (35 mi) from Palayan, 159 kilometres (99 mi) from the Philippine capital Manila, and 106 kilometers (66 mi) from Bayombong.

=== Barangays ===
San Jose City is politically subdivided into 38 barangays. Each barangay consists of puroks and some have sitios.

Barangay	PSGC	Urban/Rural
A. Pascual	34926001	Rural
Abar 2nd	34926003	Rural
Abar Ist	34926002	Urban
Bagong Sikat	34926004	Rural
Caanawan	34926005	Rural
Calaocan	34926006	Urban
Camanacsacan	34926007	Rural
Canuto Ramos Poblacion (District III)	34926021	Rural
Crisanto Sanchez Poblacion (District V)	34926023	Rural
Culaylay	34926008	Rural
Dizol	34926009	Rural
Ferdinand E. Marcos Poblacion (District II)	34926020	Rural
Kaliwanagan	34926010	Rural
Kita-Kita	34926011	Rural
Malasin	34926012	Urban
Manicla	34926013	Rural
Palestina	34926014	Rural
Parang Mangga	34926015	Rural
Pinili	34926017	Rural
Porais	34926024	Rural
Rafael Rueda Sr. Poblacion (District I)	34926019	Urban
Raymundo Eugenio Poblacion (District IV)	34926022	Urban
San Agustin	34926027	Rural
San Juan	34926028	Rural
San Mauricio	34926029	Rural
Santo Niño 1st	34926030	Urban
Santo Niño 2nd	34926031	Urban
Santo Niño 3rd	34926035	Urban
Santo Tomas	34926032	Rural
Sibut	34926033	Urban
Sinipit Bubon	34926034	Rural
Tabulac	34926036	Rural
Tayabo	34926037	Rural
Tondod	34926038	Rural
Tulat	34926039	Rural
Villa Floresta	34926040	Rural
Villa Joson (Parilla)	34926016	Rural
Villa Marina	34926042	Rural

=== Climate ===
San Jose has a tropical wet and dry climate (Köppen-Geiger system: Aw), The average annual temperature is 26.7 °C (80.1 °F) in San Jose. Precipitation here averages 1,869 mm (73.6 in).

The city of San Jose lies at 15° 47' North, 120° 59' East in Central Luzon. The estimated elevation at these coordinates is approximately 109.9 meters or 360.4 feet above mean sea level. The city has two pronounced seasons, rainy season from the months of May to November and the dry season in the remaining months.

Climate data for San Jose, Nueva Ecija
Month	Jan	Feb	Mar	Apr	May	Jun	Jul	Aug	Sep	Oct	Nov	Dec	Year
Mean daily maximum °C (°F)	29.7 (85.5)	30.6 (87.1)	32.1 (89.8)	33.4 (92.1)	33.8 (92.8)	32.6 (90.7)	31.6 (88.9)	31.0 (87.8)	31.2 (88.2)	31.3 (88.3)	30.5 (86.9)	30.0 (86.0)	33.8 (92.8)
Daily mean °C (°F)	24.7 (76.5)	25.2 (77.4)	26.6 (79.9)	27.9 (82.2)	28.5 (83.3)	27.9 (82.2)	27.3 (81.1)	27.0 (80.6)	27.1 (80.8)	26.9 (80.4)	26.0 (78.8)	25.4 (77.7)	28.5 (83.3)
Mean daily minimum °C (°F)	19.8 (67.6)	19.9 (67.8)	21.1 (70.0)	22.5 (72.5)	23.3 (73.9)	23.3 (73.9)	23.0 (73.4)	23.1 (73.6)	23.0 (73.4)	22.5 (72.5)	21.6 (70.9)	20.8 (69.4)	19.8 (67.6)
Average rainfall mm (inches)	14.0 (0.55)	19.0 (0.75)	36.0 (1.42)	54.0 (2.13)	201.0 (7.91)	214.0 (8.43)	332.0 (13.07)	350.0 (13.78)	271.0 (10.67)	201.0 (7.91)	128.0 (5.04)	49.0 (1.93)	1,869 (73.58)
Average rainy days (≥ 0.1 mm)	1	3	3	3	13	13	16	15	17	9	5	5	103
Source: Climate-Data

== Economy ==
Poverty incidence of San Jose (%)

Source: Philippine Statistics Authority

Agriculture is the prime revenue of San Jose City since it is a part of the rice granary of the Philippines. However other agri-based produce are vegetables, fruits and onions. The city is now a leading producer of onions in the country.

The city's local crops include rice, corn, and onion; thus the city is also referred to as the "City of the Golden Harvests" and "Rice Bowl of the Philippines". Other crops are mango, banana, eggplant, and garlic.

=== Industries ===
San Jose City is home to various renewable energy firms including the 24-megawatt San Jose City iPower Corporation. Considered the first of its kind in the country, the San Jose biomass project is using 100% rice husk. The biomass facility was put up by 21 rice millers of the city in a joint venture with the Union Energy Corp. owned by businessman Lucio Co, to set up a P1.2-billion rice husk-powered system that is now generating 12 megawatts of electricity, 10.8 MW of which feed the Luzon grid. Another 12 MW expansion was commissioned in 2017.

In 2017, the Board of Investments (BOI) has approved the P777-million biomass power plant project of VS Gripal Power Corp. which involved the development, construction and operation of another 6 MW biomass power plant. Similarly, the plant generates power using rice husk as feedstock. Commercial operations started in December 2019.

Meanwhile, several other solar energy projects was put up in the city including the 10 MW SJC SolarPower Corporation project and another 10 MW solar power project by V-Mars Solar Energy Corporation which was recently acquired by Yuchengco group's PetroGreen Energy Corp.

=== Shopping centers ===
San Jose City serves as another shopping hub, besides Cabanatuan, in the province and other nearby localities and provinces like Pangasinan and Nueva Vizcaya. Malls like Waltermart and Magic Mall have already established their presence in the city.

In terms of future developments, the Philippines' major mall chains SM, Robinsons, and CityMall all have expressed plans to build branches in the city.

== Tourism ==
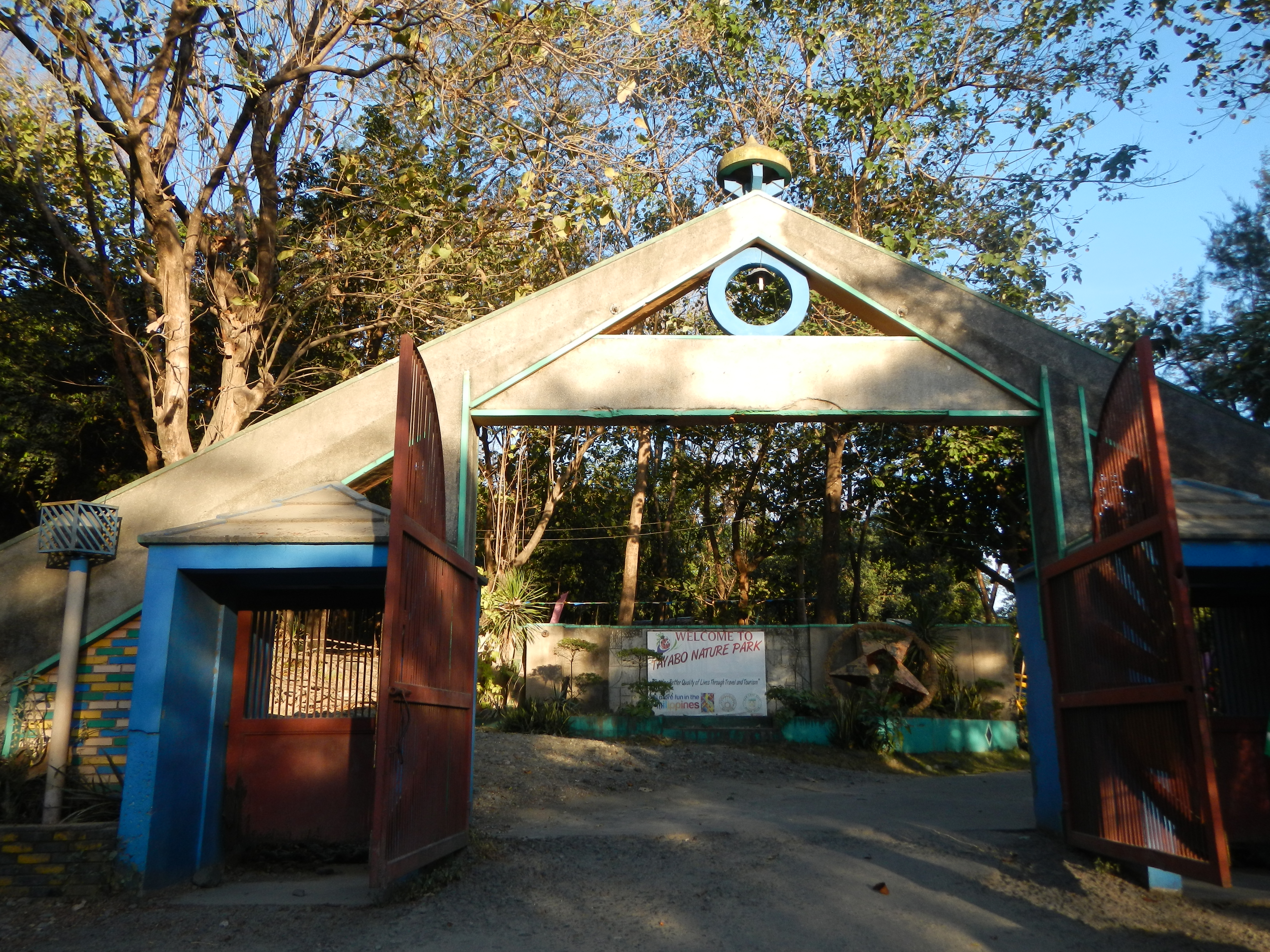
Tayabo Nature Park

Tayabo Nature Park
The park is situated at the gateway to the Cagayan Valley, at the foot of Mount Caraballo. It has a hundred step stairs leading to lamp-lit pagodas in the hilltop, and from the park can be seen Nueva Ecija.

Palasapas Falls
This waterfall is located in the outskirts of the city, in the barrio Manicla, seven kilometers away from the Poblacion.

Christmas Capital
In 2018, the city has been named as the Christmas Capital of Nueva Ecija for its grand Christmas lights.

Amangpintor Art Museum
is the first of its kind in Nueva Ecija, Philippines, and stands out as a unique museum in the country for its focus on Indigenouism Art. This art form features works created using natural pigments, such as sap from fruits and other indigenous materials, including blood and hair.

=== Festivals ===
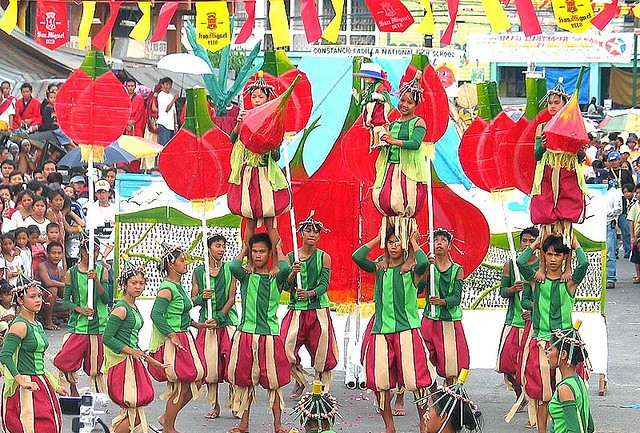
Tanduyong Festival in 2013

- Tanduyong Festival: San Jose City prides itself as the "Onion Capital of the Philippines" and is a leading producer of onion, garlic, rice and vegetables. Tanduyong is a variety of onion grown in the area. Every year, on the fourth Sunday of April, the people of San Jose celebrate the Tanduyong Festival. On festival day, the streets are filled with contingents of dancers outfitted in striking, multi-hued native costumes. Special activities included are a beauty contest, tourism, and trade fair, awarding ceremony and cultural shows.
- Pagibang Damara: Hundreds of years ago in Central Luzon, landlords in the haciendas made the farmers build the “damara”, just before planting time of palay. A “damara” is a makeshift shelter made from kawayan (bamboo) and nipa, built at the center of ricefields as a protection from the sun's heat or from rain. Over the years, it has been a tradition that after all the harvests were safely brought home, the “damaras” are demolished (“ginigiba”). People then start celebrating together for the bountiful harvest.

In 2008, with rice as its primary produce, San Jose City conducted its First Rice Festival, adopting the century – old festive tradition. However, unlike in older days, wherein people celebrate separately in their barangays, San Jose City now celebrates together. The after-harvest celebration has become a multi-sectoral effort, collectively prepared, funded out of contributions (from the public and private sector), and participated in by all sections of the city.

Since 2015, Pagibang Damara festival features the best Pancit Kanin contest. Pansit Kanin is one of the most common menus among carinderias in San Jose City.

== Transportation ==
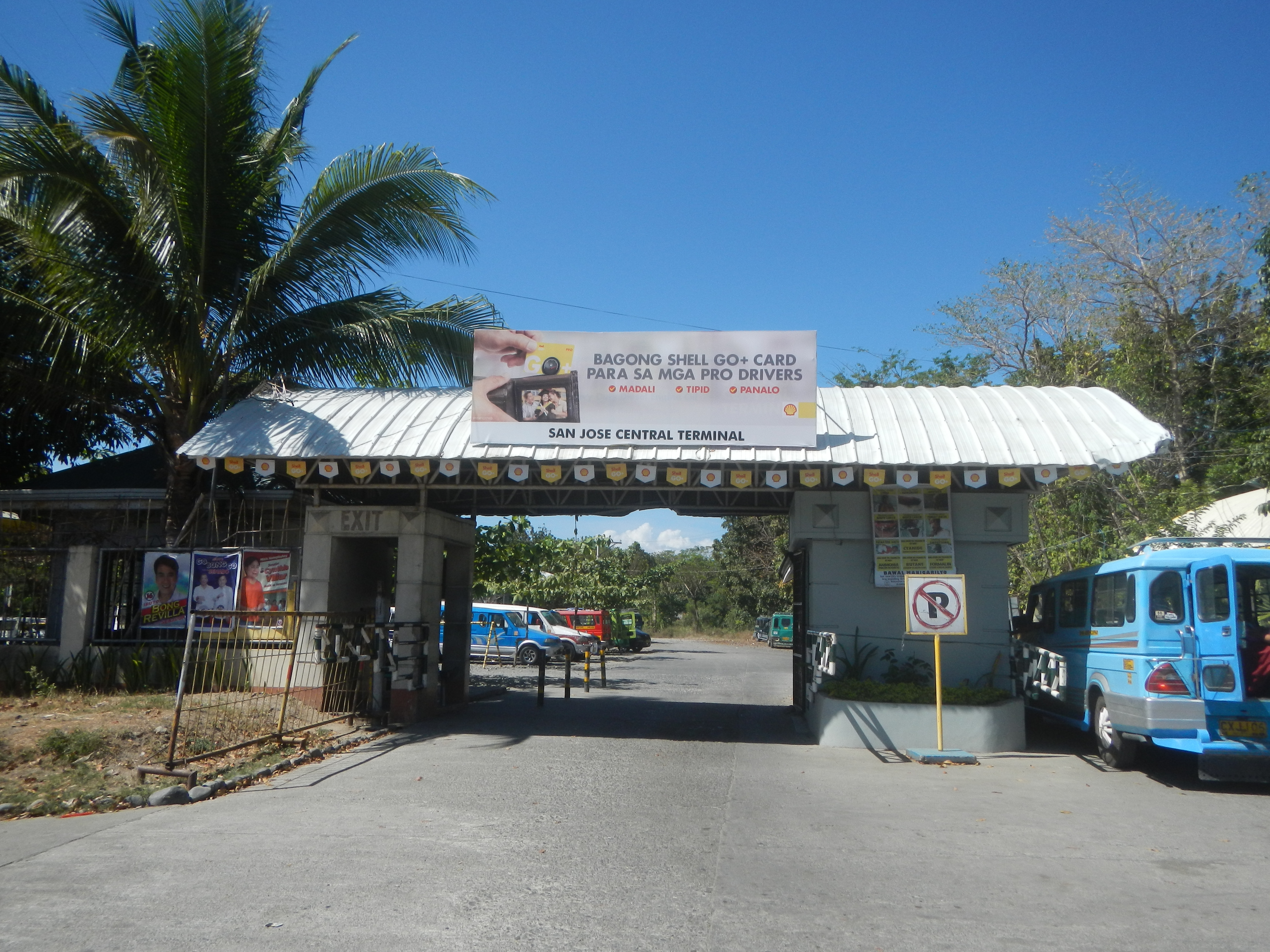
San Jose City Central Terminal

Major bus companies from Metro Manila ply the route going to San Jose City along the Pan-Philippine Highway. Baliwag Transit, Inc. has terminal in Pasay and Cubao, Quezon City has buses that travel specifically to and from Nueva Ecija.

Bus companies going to San Jose City:

- Baliwag Transit From Cubao/Caloocan
- Saulog Transit From Olongapo City
- Arayat Express From Olongapo City
- Genesis Transport From Mariveles, Bataan/San Fernando City, Pampanga
- Golden Bee Transport and Logistics Corporation From Cubao/Pasay
- Viron Transit From Narvacan, Ilocos Sur
- Victory Liner From Cubao
- Five Star From Cubao

=== Former PNR Station in San Jose ===
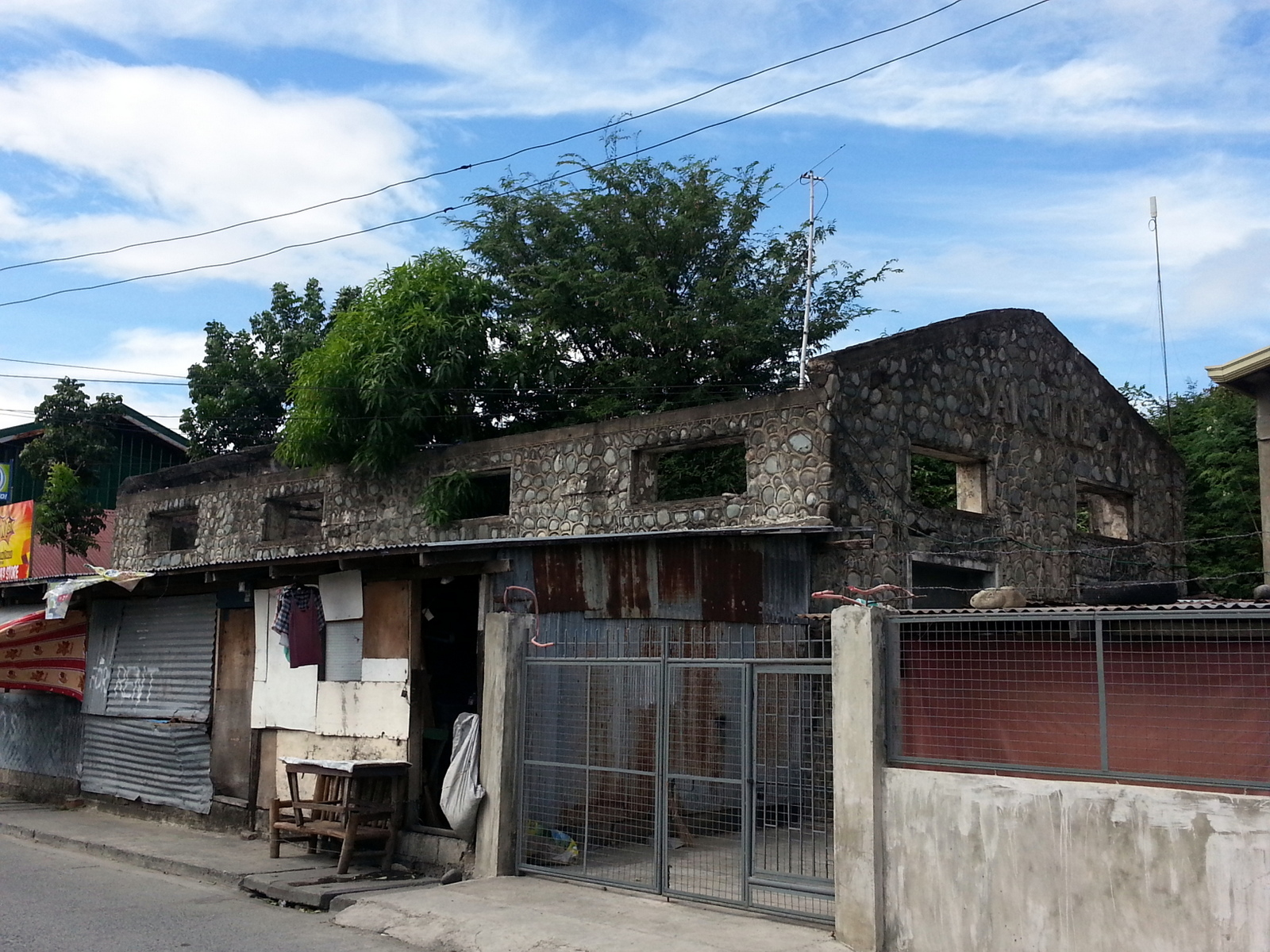
Ruins of the old PNR station in San Jose City

The Philippine National Railways (then Manila Railroad Company) used to have a branch line northwards from Tutuban station in Manila and branches out from the mainline in Tarlac City going to San Jose City. The Tarlac-San Jose line, which served the towns of Guimba, Muñoz and San Jose, was initially constructed in the 1920s and was completed in 1939. However, in 1988, the North Main Line was closed (see Philippine National Railways) and subsequently dismantled. The concrete ruins of the old PNR station of San Jose are located along San Roque Street in Barangay Abar 1st.

=== Expressways and Bypass Roads ===
San Jose City shall also be serviced by a future expressway, which is the partially completed Central Luzon Link Expressway (SCTEX-TPLEX to San Jose City), when finished. The expressway will shorten the usual travel time between the neighboring provinces and San Jose City also stimulating the economy of the towns that the carriageway will pass through as a direct consequence.

To decongest the Pan-Philippine Highway, San Jose City Bypass Road was constructed. It passes through barangays Caanawan, Abar 2nd, Sto. Niño 1st and 2nd, Malasin, Manicla and Kita-kita; and ends at San Jose-Lupao Road, serving as an easier access going to Tarlac and Umingan, Pangasinan.

== Education ==
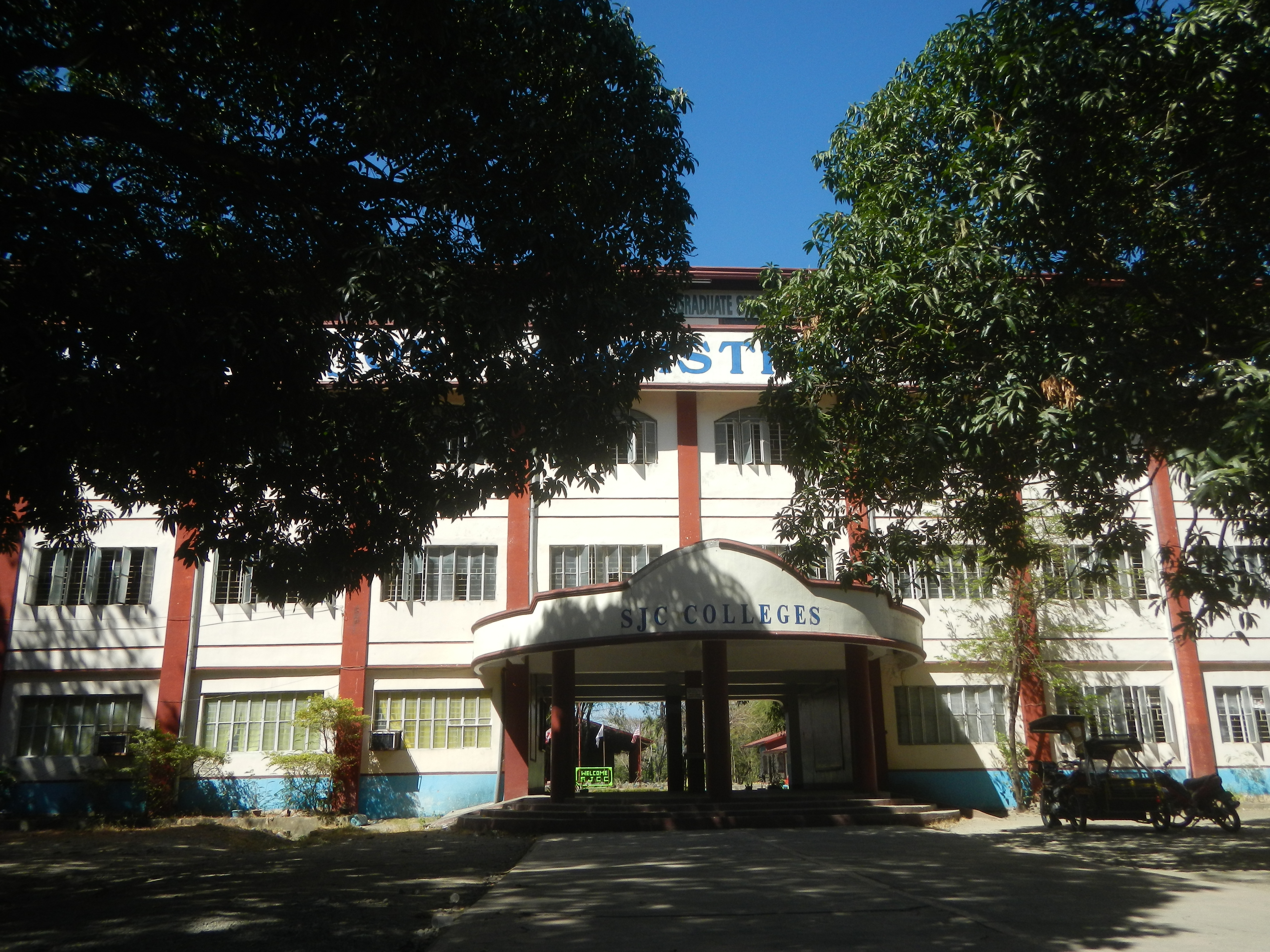
San Jose Christian Colleges

San Jose City has many private and public schools.

Private schools:

- Bethany Christian Academy
- Bettbien Montessori
- Bascos San Jose School
- Bettbien High School
- College for Research & Technology- San Jose City Campus
- Core Gateway College
- Hope Of Manitoba Essential Academy (HOME Academy)
- Mount Carmel Montessori Center
- Nieves Center for Education, Inc. -San Jose City
- San Jose Christian Colleges
- School of the Sacred Heart of San Jose City
- St. Joseph School
- Gracious Shepherd Christian Academy
- Keanney-Diaz Educational Institute
- Elim School for Values and Excellence
- Evangelical Christian Academy
- St. John's Academy
- STI College San Jose City
- St. Augustine Foundation Colleges of Nueva Ecija Inc. San Jose City
- Araullo University San Jose Campus

Public schools:

- San Jose East Central School
- San Jose West Central School
- Abar Elementary School
- Bagong Sikat Integrated School
- Caanawan National High School
- Caanawan Elementary School
- Calaocan Elementary School
- CLSU Laboratory High School-Pinili
- San Jose City National High School (Formerly CPNHS)
- Constancio Padilla National High School Kita-kita Annex
- Porais National High School
- Porais Elementary School
- Pinili Elementary School
- San Agustin Integrated School
- Santo Tomas Elementary School
- Santo Niño 3rd High School
- Tayabo Elementary School
- Tayabo High School – CPNHS Annex
- Tondod High School

== Notable personalities ==
- Lino Brocka – Director and National Artist for Film
- Manuel Chua – Actor, Model and Politician
- Ramon H. Lopez – painter
- Kokoy Salvador – representative, Nueva Ecija's 2nd district
- Aniceto Sobrepeña – Filipino businessman, civil servant and civic leader
- Oscar Solis – Bishop of Salt Lake City in Utah since 2017, first Filipino-American Catholic bishop
- Marvin Gagarin – singer; Pinoy Pop Superstar 3 grand finalist
