= St. Joseph School of San Jose City, Nueva Ecija =

Roman Catholic school in Nueva Ecija, Philippines

St. Joseph School of San Jose City, N.E., Inc.

Location
- Bonifacio St. San Jose City, Nueva Ecija; Philippines
- Coordinates: 15°47′34″N 120°59′22″E

Information
- Type: Non-profit Private School
- Motto: Giving Christ centered quality education and holistic formation towards building a faith community.
- Religious affiliation: Catholic
- Established: June 19, 1946
- Director: Rev. Fr. Ronald Rhoel T. Ocampo
- Principal: Sr. Myrna I. Pinera, SFIC
- Grades: K to 12
- Enrollment: 800 (estimated)
- Color: Battle green
- Nickname: The Josephians
- Affiliations: Catholic Educational Association of the Philippines (CEAP)

St. Joseph School of San Jose City, N.E., Inc., was founded in 1946. It was formerly known as St. Joseph School, which was named after the city saint of San Jose City, Nueva Ecija. This school is a non-profit, private Catholic elementary and secondary school located in the heart of San Jose City, Philippines.The elementary and secondary school is known as the Center of Elementary and Secondary Education in San Jose City, Nueva Ecija because it is located in San Jose City, a city in the central part of the Philippines. The school's elementary department is situated near the city market, City Hall, along Bonifacio St. while its high school department is situated near Mary Help of Christian Church, hotels and restaurants along Barangay Malasin.

== History ==
St. Joseph School of San Jose City, N.E., Inc. is a Catholic institution of learning. It was founded in 1946 by the Reverend Theodore Keat, MSC, then the parish priest of San Jose, Nueva Ecija. It was the fulfillment of the parishioner's long desire for a Catholic School.

St. Joseph was established on June 19, 1946. St. Joseph School was a parochial School. Since its foundation, it has been managed by the Missionaries of the Sacred Heart and the Franciscan Sisters of the Immaculate Conception.

In 1986, the Missionaries of the Sacred Heart (MSC) turned over the management of the school to the Diocese and the Franciscan Sisters of the Immaculate Conception continued their services in the dioceses through administration of the institution.

St. Joseph School offers K to 12. It is Co-educational. The institution is a member of a Catholic Educational Association of the Philippines (CEAP) and the Nueva Ecija Catholic Schools Association (NESCA).
