= Indigenous materials in the Philippines =

Indigenous materials are materials that are naturally and locally found in a specific place such as timbers, canes, grass, palms, and rattan. Other indigenous raw materials in the country that are commonly known and used creatively in crafts and decoration are capiz, pearls, corals, and seashells, being an archipelago naturally abundant in beaches and marine resources.

== Arts and crafts ==
The native Filipino products, like in wooden or rattan furniture and handicrafts, woven abaca or pinacloth, and other handmade or carved toy or trinket one usually finds in rural areas was made from indigenous raw materials. Natural fibers from rattan, bamboo, nipa leaves, abaca and pina are commonly used for weaving.

Filipino architectures established the importance of using indigenous materials sawali, it is still naturally cooler than condos and houses.
