= Chinese New Year =

Traditional Chinese holiday

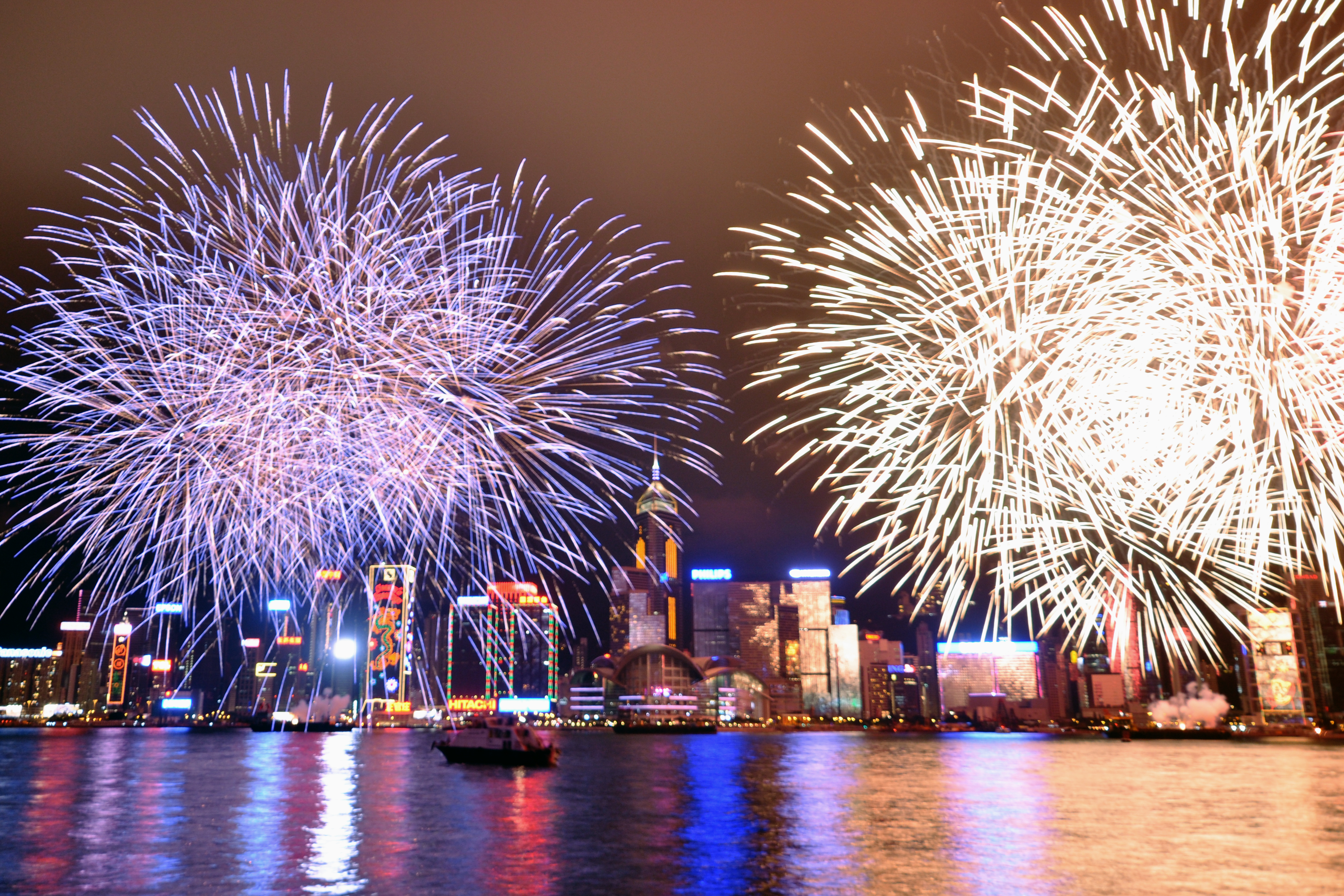
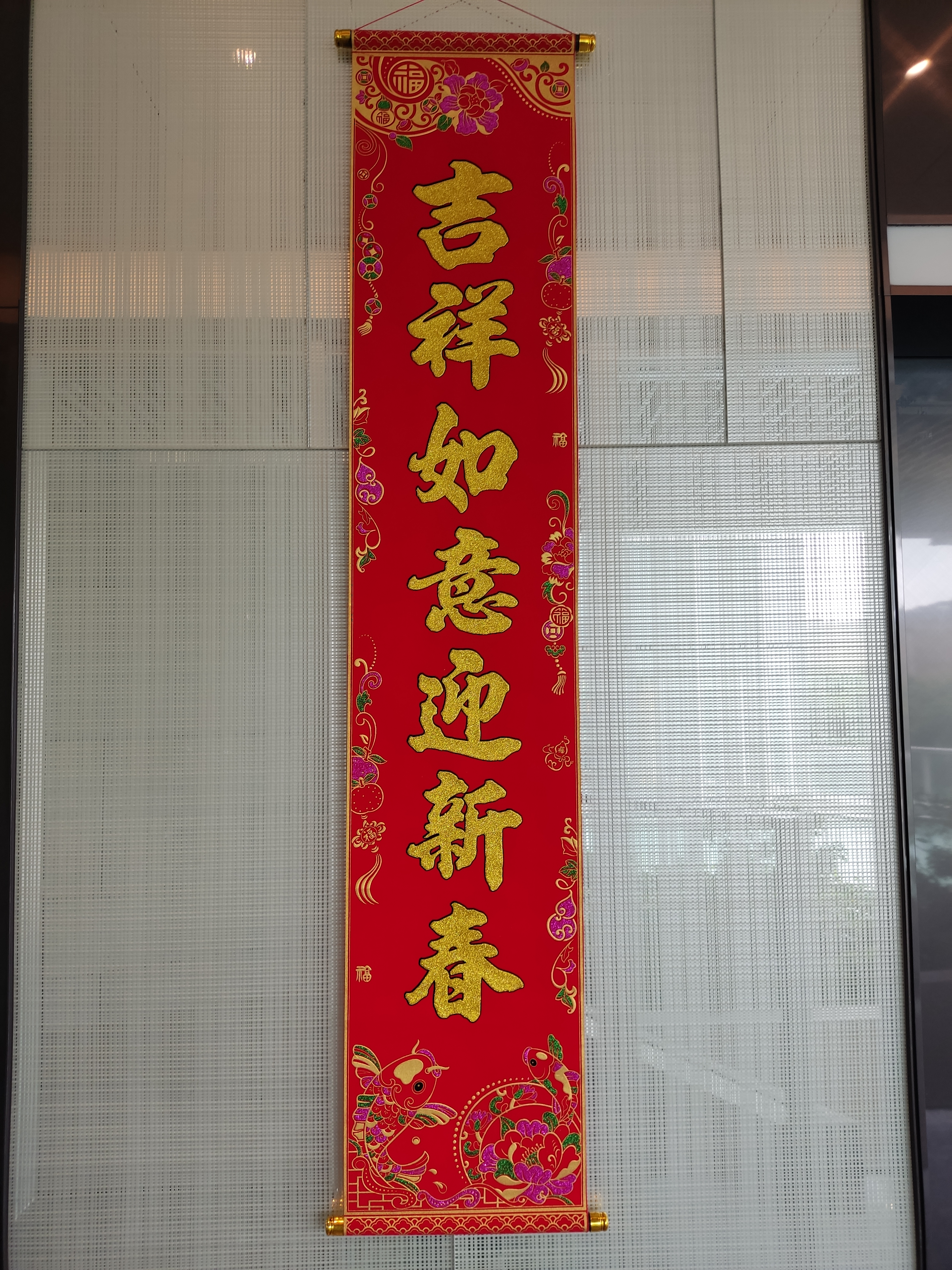
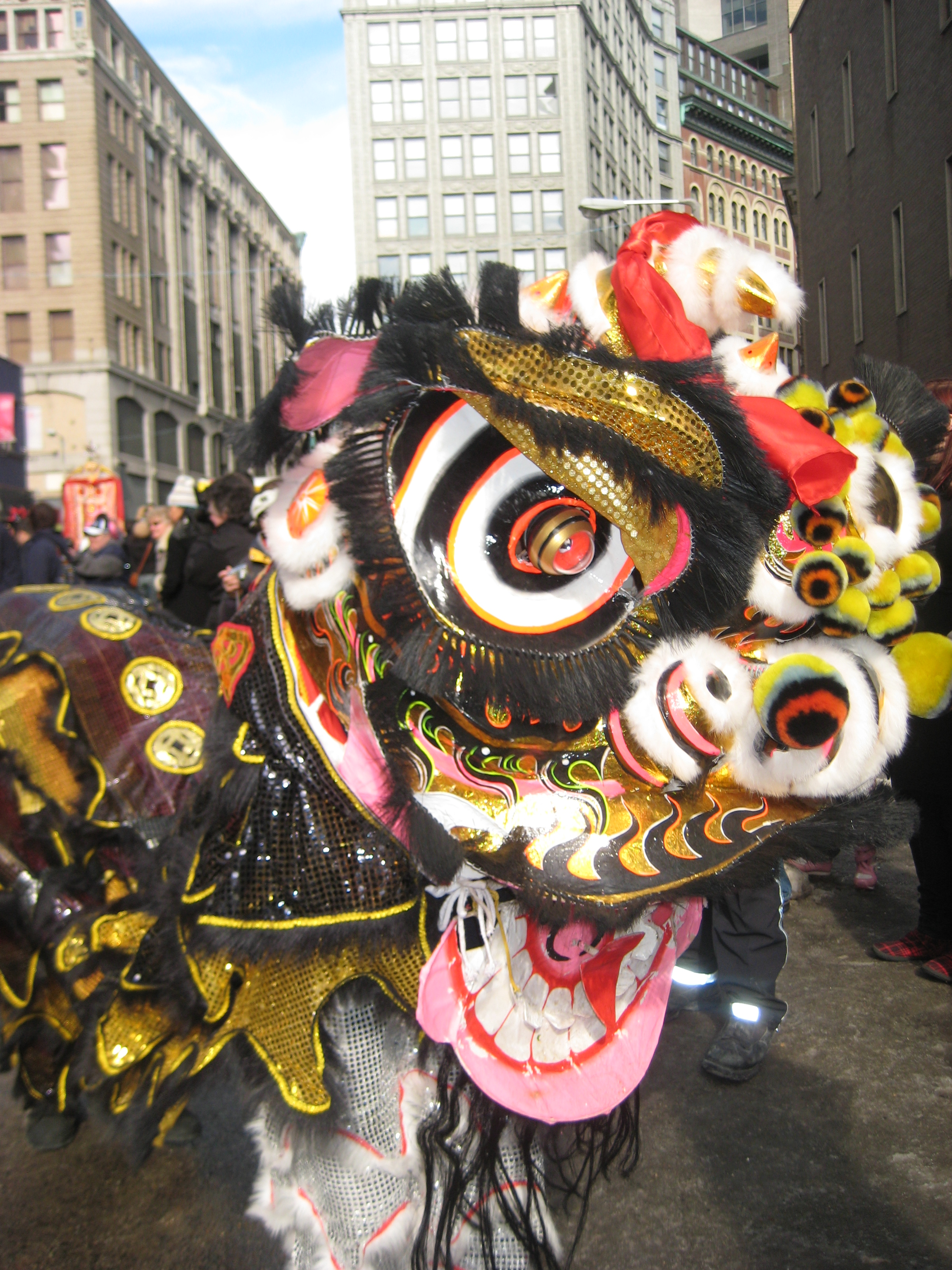
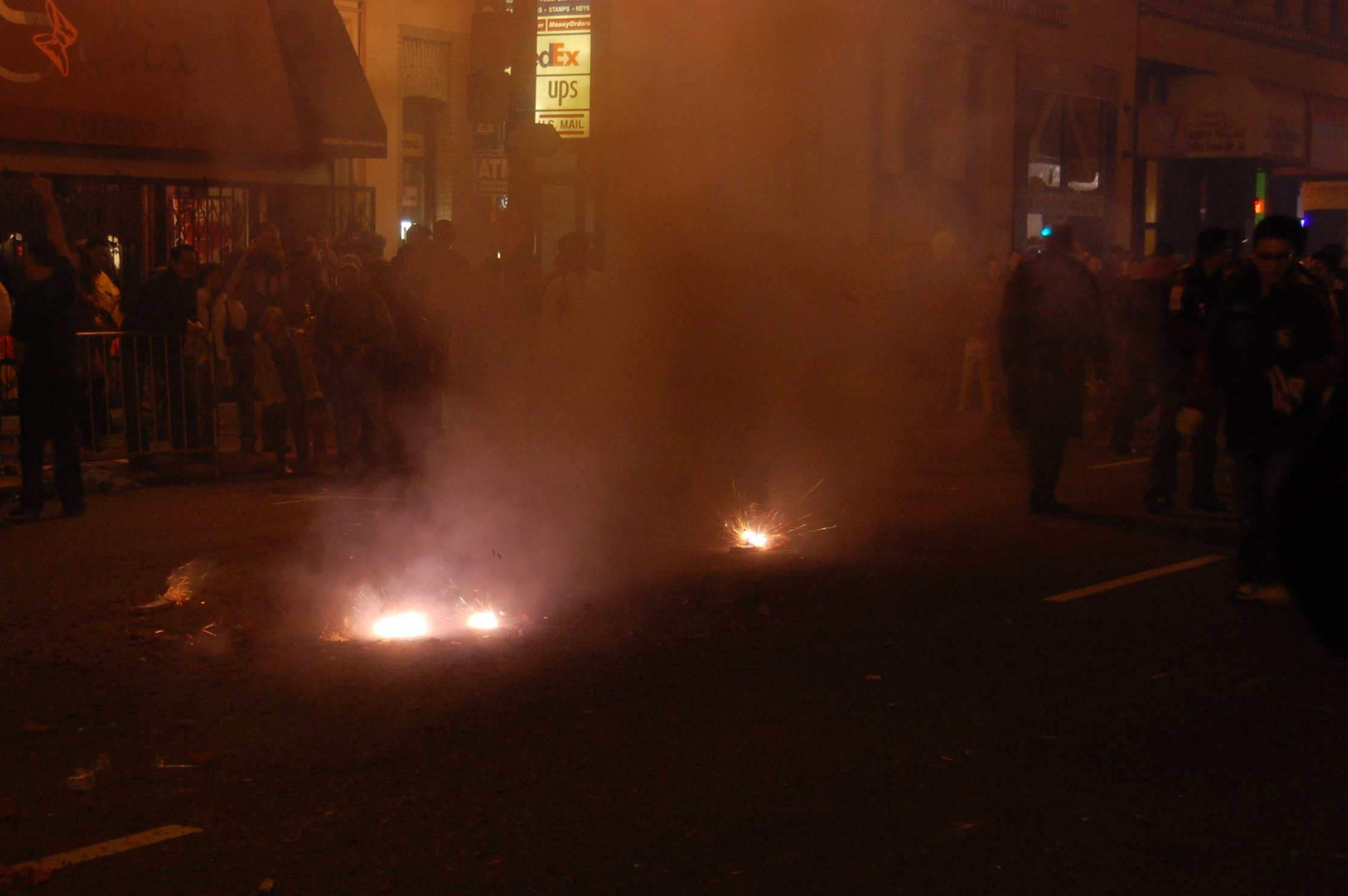
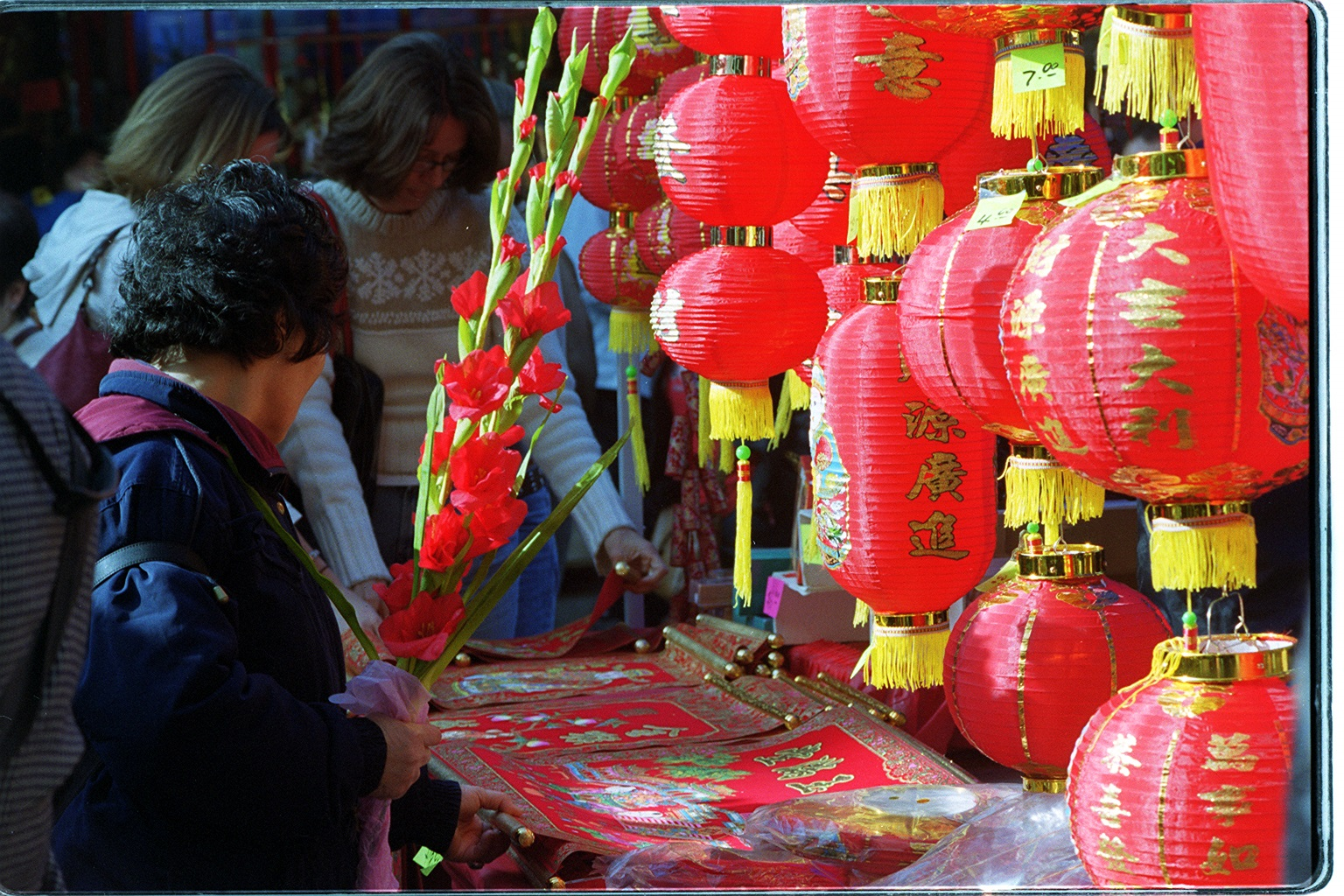
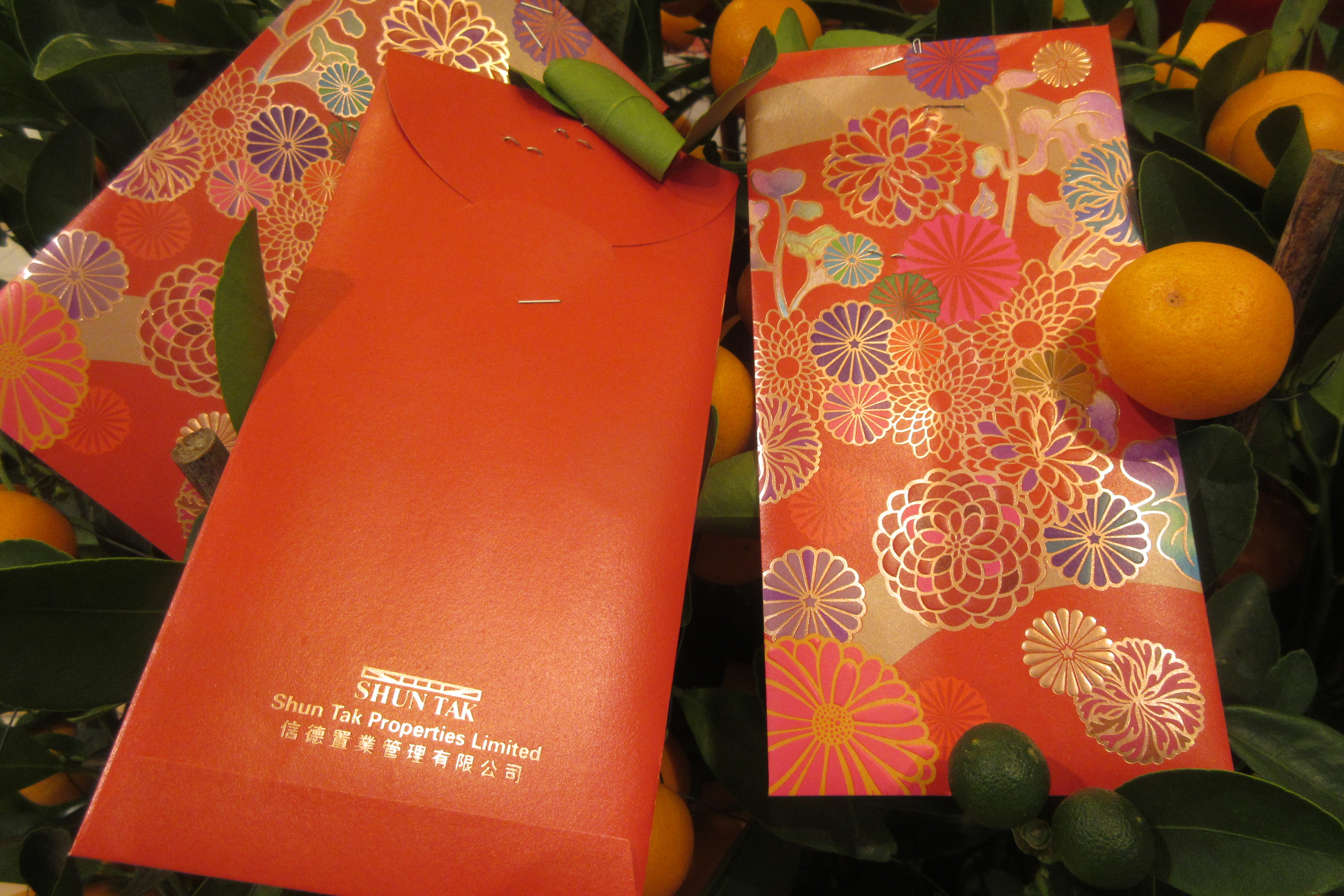
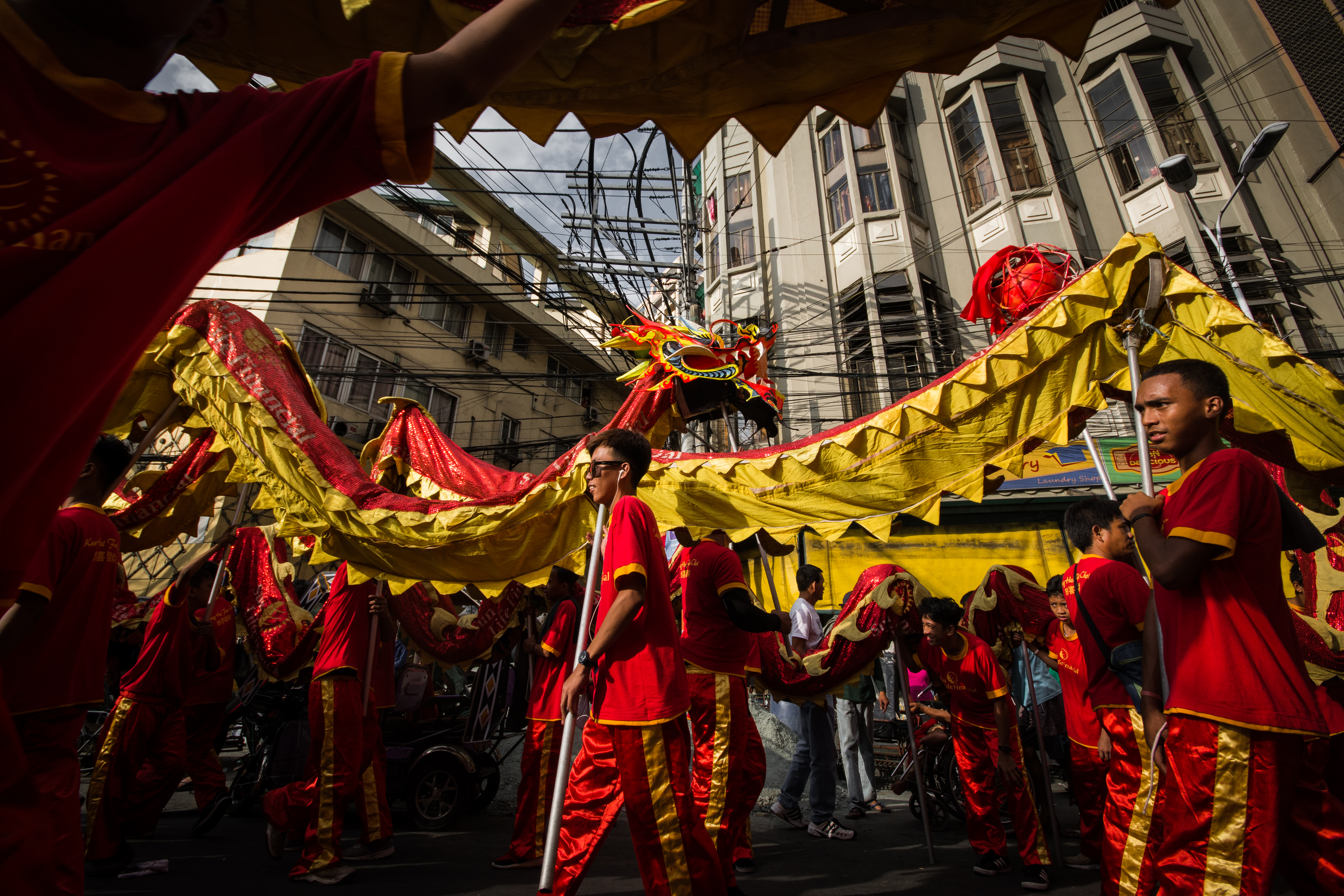
- Clockwise from the top Fireworks over Victoria Harbour in Hong Kong; lion dance in Boston Chinatown; red lanterns on display; complex patterns woven at dragon dance in Binondo, Manila; red envelopes; firecrackers exploding; spring couplet
- Also called: Spring Festival
- Observed by: Chinese people and Sinophone communities
- Type: Cultural; Religious (Chinese folk religion, Han Buddhist, Confucian, Taoist, some Christian communities)
- Significance: To mark the beginning of a new year on the traditional lunisolar Chinese calendar
- Celebrations: Lion dances, dragon dances, fireworks, family gathering, family meal, visiting friends and relatives, giving red envelopes, decorating with chunlian couplets
- Date: First day of the first Chinese lunisolar month
- 2025 date: 29 January (Snake)
- 2026 date: 17 February (Horse)
- 2027 date: 6 February (Goat)
- 2028 date: 26 January (Monkey)
- Frequency: Annual
- Related to: Lantern Festival and similar celebrations in other Asian cultures

Chinese name
- Traditional Chinese: 春節
- Simplified Chinese: 春节
- Literal meaning: "Spring Festival"
Transcriptions
Standard Mandarin
- Hanyu Pinyin: Chūn jié
- Bopomofo: ㄔㄨㄣ ㄐㄧㄝˊ
- Wade–Giles: Ch'un^{1} chieh^{2}
- Tongyong Pinyin: Chun jié
- IPA: [ʈʂʰwə́n tɕjě]
Wu
- Romanization: Tshen tsiq
Yue: Cantonese
- Yale Romanization: Chēun ji
- Jyutping: Ceon1 zit3
- IPA: [tsʰɵn˥ tsit̚˧]
Southern Min
- Hokkien POJ: Chhun cheh
- Tâi-lô: Tshun tseh

Agricultural Calendar New Year
- Traditional Chinese: 農曆新年
- Simplified Chinese: 农历新年
Transcriptions
Standard Mandarin
- Hanyu Pinyin: Nónglì xīnnián
- Bopomofo: ㄋㄨㄥˊ ㄌㄧˋ ㄒㄧㄣ ㄋㄧㄢˊ
- Wade–Giles: Nung^{2}-li^{1} hsin^{1}-nien^{2}
- Tongyong Pinyin: Nóng-lì sin-nián
- IPA: [nʊ̌ŋ.lî ɕín.njɛ̌n]
Yue: Cantonese
- Yale Romanization: Nùhnglihk Sānnìhn
- Jyutping: Nung4 lik6 san1 nin4

Traditional Chinese New Year
- Traditional Chinese: 中國傳統新年
- Simplified Chinese: 中国传统新年
Transcriptions
Standard Mandarin
- Hanyu Pinyin: Zhōngguó chuántǒng xīnnián
- Bopomofo: ㄓㄨㄥ ㄍㄨㄛˊ ㄔㄨㄢˊ ㄊㄨㄥˇ ㄒㄧㄣ ㄋㄧㄢˊ
- Wade–Giles: Chung^{1}-kuo^{2} ch'uan^{2}-tong^{3} hsin^{1}-nien^{2}
- Tongyong Pinyin: Jhongguó chuán-tǒng sin-nián
- IPA: [ʈʂʊ́ŋ.kwǒ ʈʂʰwǎn.tʰʊ̀ŋ ɕín.njɛ̌n]

Spring Festival— Social practices of the Chinese people in celebration of traditional new year
- UNESCO Intangible Cultural Heritage
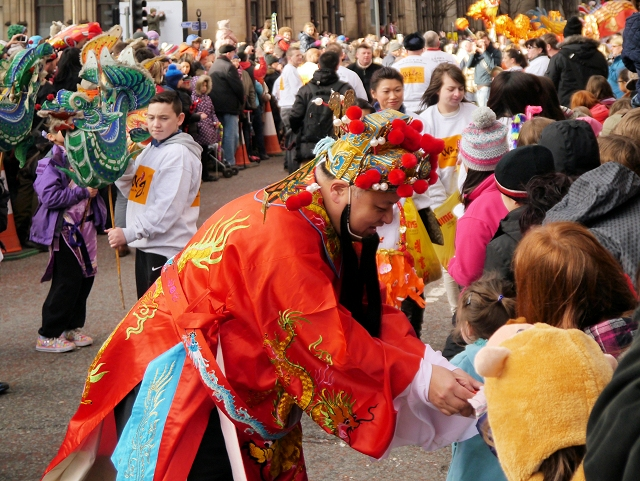
- Chinese New Year Celebrations
- Country: China
- Reference: 2126
- Region: Asia and the Pacific

Inscription history
- Inscription: 2024 (19th session)
- List: Representative
- UNESCO Cultural Heritage

Chinese New Year, also known as the Spring Festival, marks the beginning of a new year on the traditional lunisolar Chinese calendar. It is one of the most important holidays in Chinese culture. Marking the end of winter and the beginning of spring, this festival takes place from Chinese New Year's Eve (the evening preceding the first day of the year) to the Lantern Festival, held on the 15th day of the year. The first day of the Chinese New Year falls on the new moon that appears between 21 January and 20 February.

The Chinese New Year is associated with several myths and customs. The festival was traditionally a time to honour deities and ancestors. Throughout China, different regions celebrate the New Year with distinct local customs and traditions. Chinese New Year's Eve is an occasion for Chinese families to gather for the annual reunion dinner. Traditionally, every family would thoroughly clean their house, symbolically sweeping away any ill fortune to make way for incoming good luck. Windows and doors may be decorated with red paper-cuts and couplets representing themes such as good fortune, happiness, wealth, and longevity. Other activities include lighting firecrackers and giving money in red envelopes.

Chinese New Year is also celebrated worldwide in regions and countries with significant overseas Chinese or Sinophone populations, especially in Southeast Asia, including Singapore, Brunei, Cambodia, Indonesia, Malaysia, Myanmar, the Philippines, and Thailand. It is also prominent beyond Asia, especially in Australia, Canada, France, Mauritius, New Zealand, Peru, South Africa, the United Kingdom, as well as in many other European countries, and the United States. Chinese New Year has influenced celebrations, commonly referred to collectively as Lunar New Year, in other cultures, such as the Losar of Tibet, the Tết of Vietnam, the Seollal of Korea, and the Ryukyu New Year (Okinawan: Sjoogwaci).

== Names ==
In Chinese, the festival is commonly known as the "Spring Festival" (traditional Chinese: 春節; simplified Chinese: 春节; pinyin: Chūnjié), as the spring season in the lunisolar calendar traditionally starts with lichun, the first of the twenty-four solar terms that the festival celebrates around the time of the Chinese New Year. The name was first proposed in 1914 by Yuan Shikai, who was the interim president of the Republic of China. The official usage of the name "Spring Festival" was retained by the government of the People's Republic of China, but the government of the Republic of China based in Taiwan has since adopted the name "Traditional Chinese New Year".

The festival is also called "Lunar New Year" in English, despite the traditional Chinese calendar being lunisolar and not lunar. However, "Chinese New Year" is still a commonly used translation for people of non-Chinese backgrounds. Along with the Han Chinese inside and outside of Greater China, as many as 29 of the 55 ethnic minority groups in China also celebrate Chinese New Year. Korea, Vietnam, Singapore, Malaysia, Indonesia, and the Philippines celebrate it as an official festival.

In recent years, the English translation of the Spring Festival has sparked controversy. In many countries outside China, "Lunar New Year" is considered a more inclusive name and has been widely used for years; however, some Chinese public opinion views "Lunar New Year" as an act of "De-Sinicization". In 2025, the Chinese tea brand CHAGEE translated the Spring Festival as "Lunar New Year", which caused controversy. On January 24, 2025, CHAGEE urgently changed its copy and apologized.

== Dates in the Chinese lunisolar calendar ==
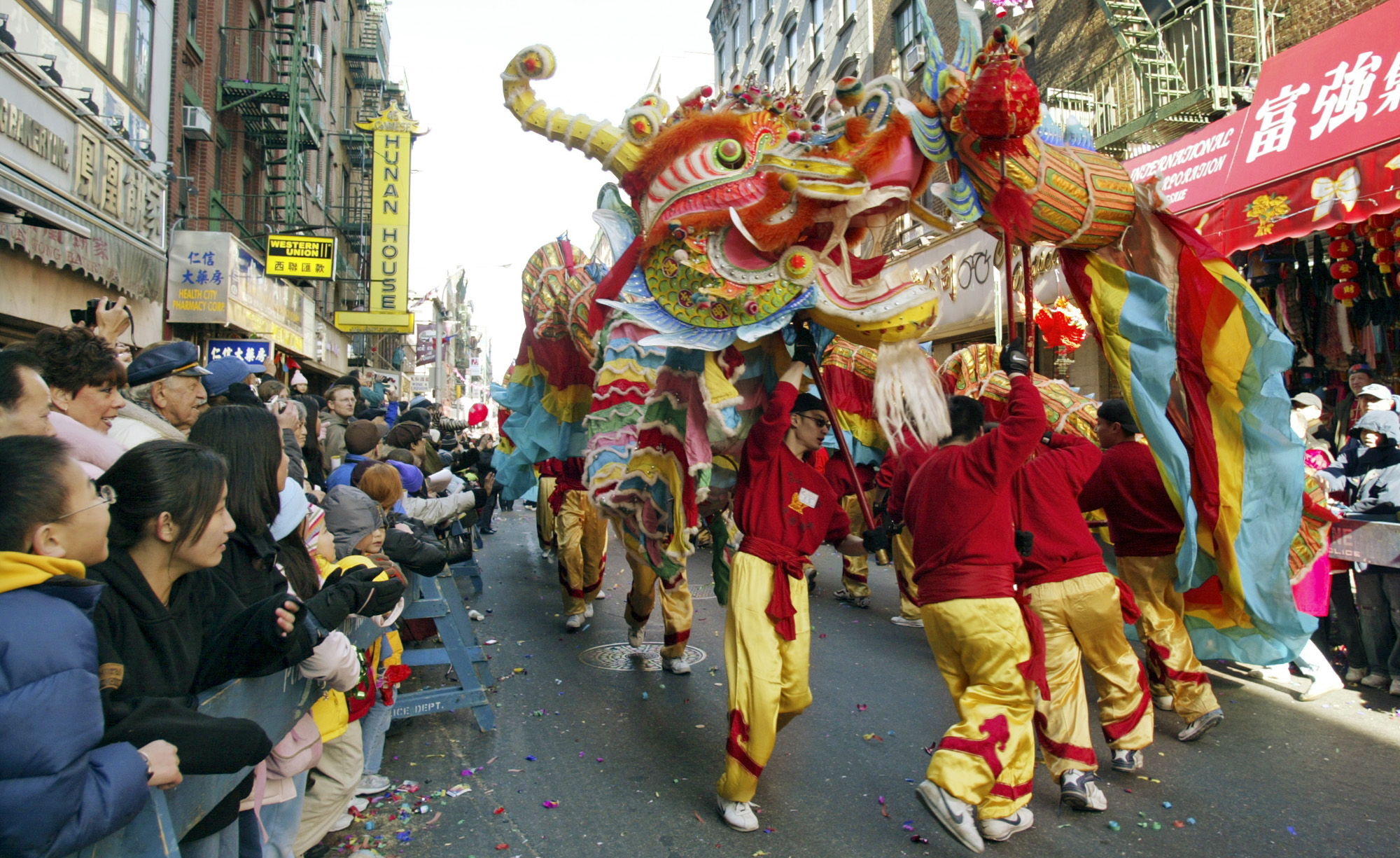
The largest Chinese New Year parade outside Asia, in Chinatown, Manhattan

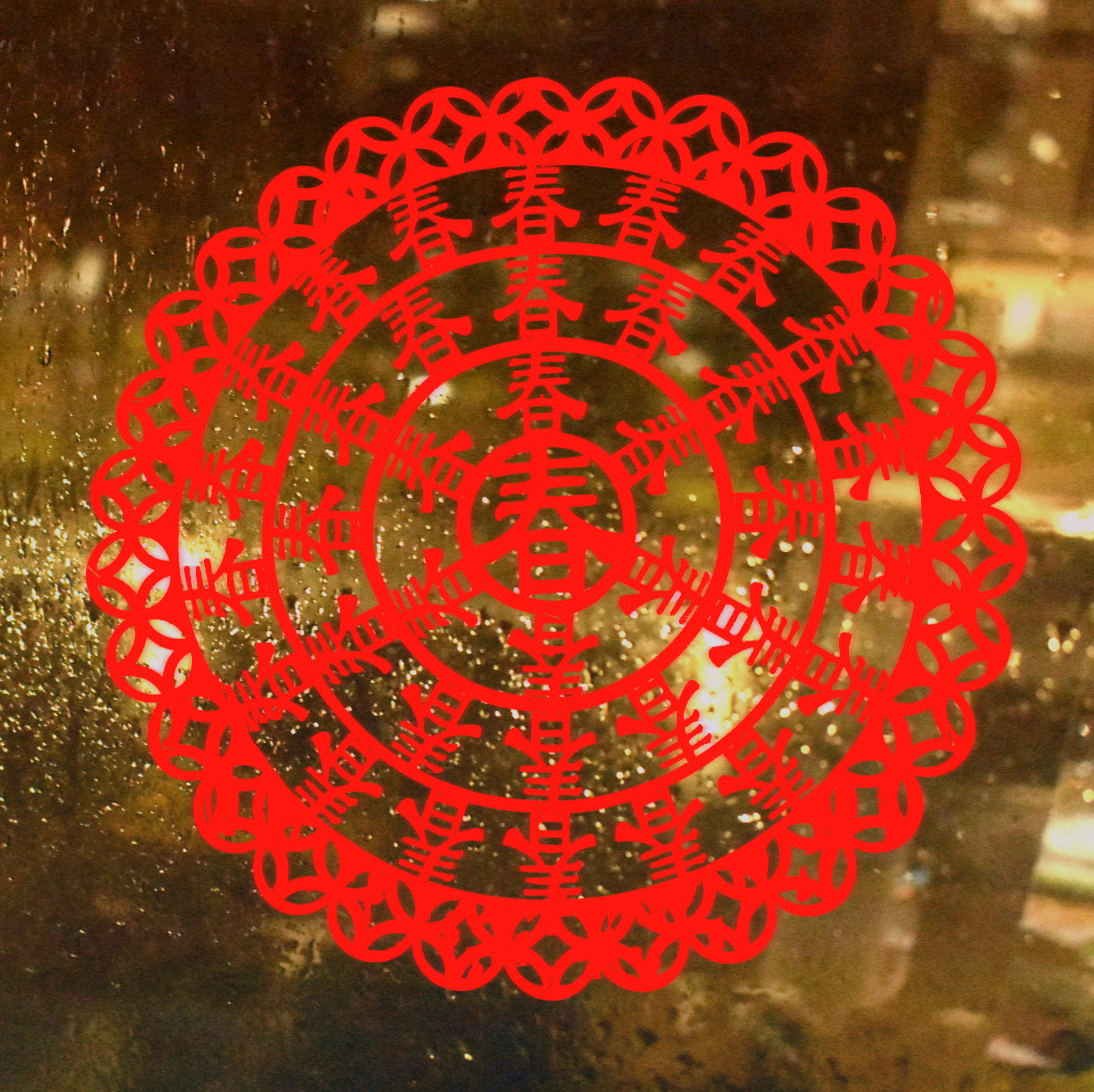
Traditional paper cutting with the character 春 ('spring')

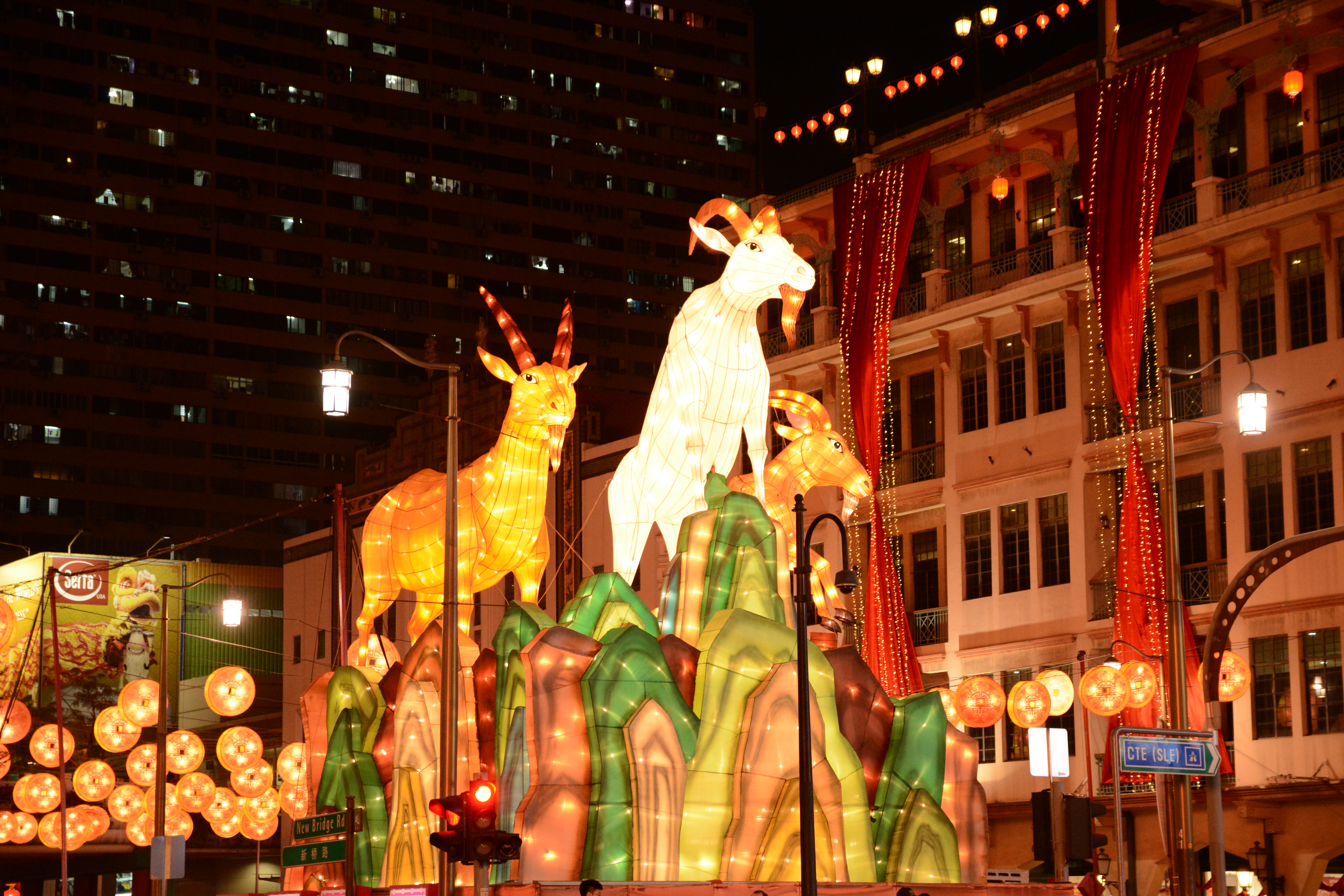
Chinese New Year decorations along New Bridge Road in Singapore

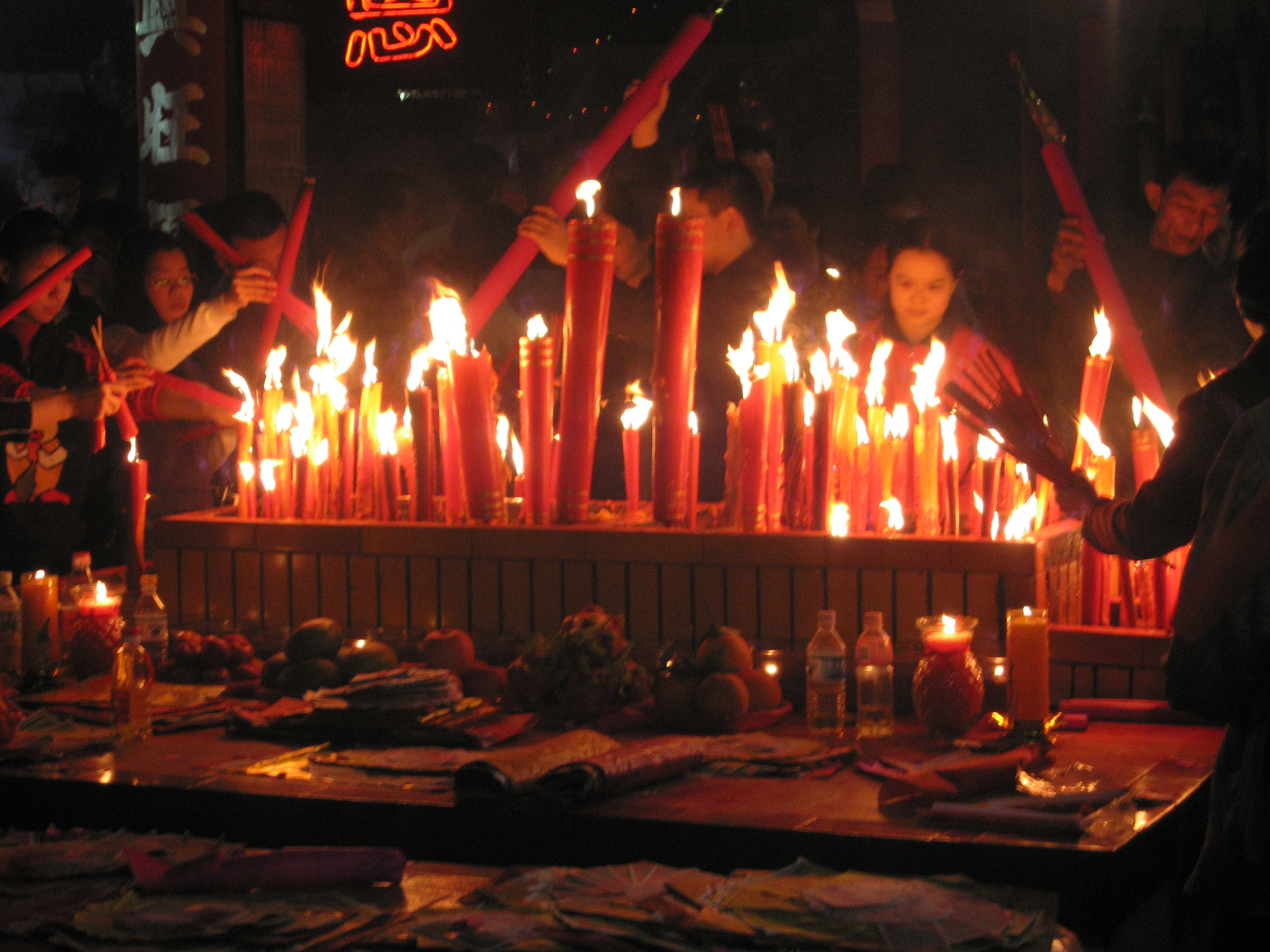
Chinese New Year eve in Meizhou on 8 February 2005

The Chinese calendar defines the lunisolar month containing the winter solstice as the eleventh month, meaning that Chinese New Year usually falls on the second new moon after the winter solstice (rarely the third, if an intercalary month occurs (Note: The next occurrence will be in 2033.)). In more than 96 percent of years, the Chinese New Year is the closest new moon to the beginning of spring (lichun) according to the calendar. In the Gregorian calendar, Chinese New Year occurs on the new moon that falls between 21 January and 20 February (Note: And in extremely rare cases, 21 February, such as in 2319, which would be the first occurrence since the 1645 calendar reform.).

Gregorian	Date	Animal
2026	Tuesday, 17 February	Horse
2027	Saturday, 6 February	Goat
2028	Wednesday, 26 January	Monkey
2029	Tuesday, 13 February	Rooster
2030	Sunday, 3 February	Dog
2031	Thursday, 23 January	Pig
2032	Wednesday, 11 February	Rat
2033	Monday, 31 January	Ox
2034	Sunday, 19 February	Tiger
2035	Thursday, 8 February	Rabbit
2036	Monday, 28 January	Dragon
2037	Sunday, 15 February	Snake

== Mythology ==
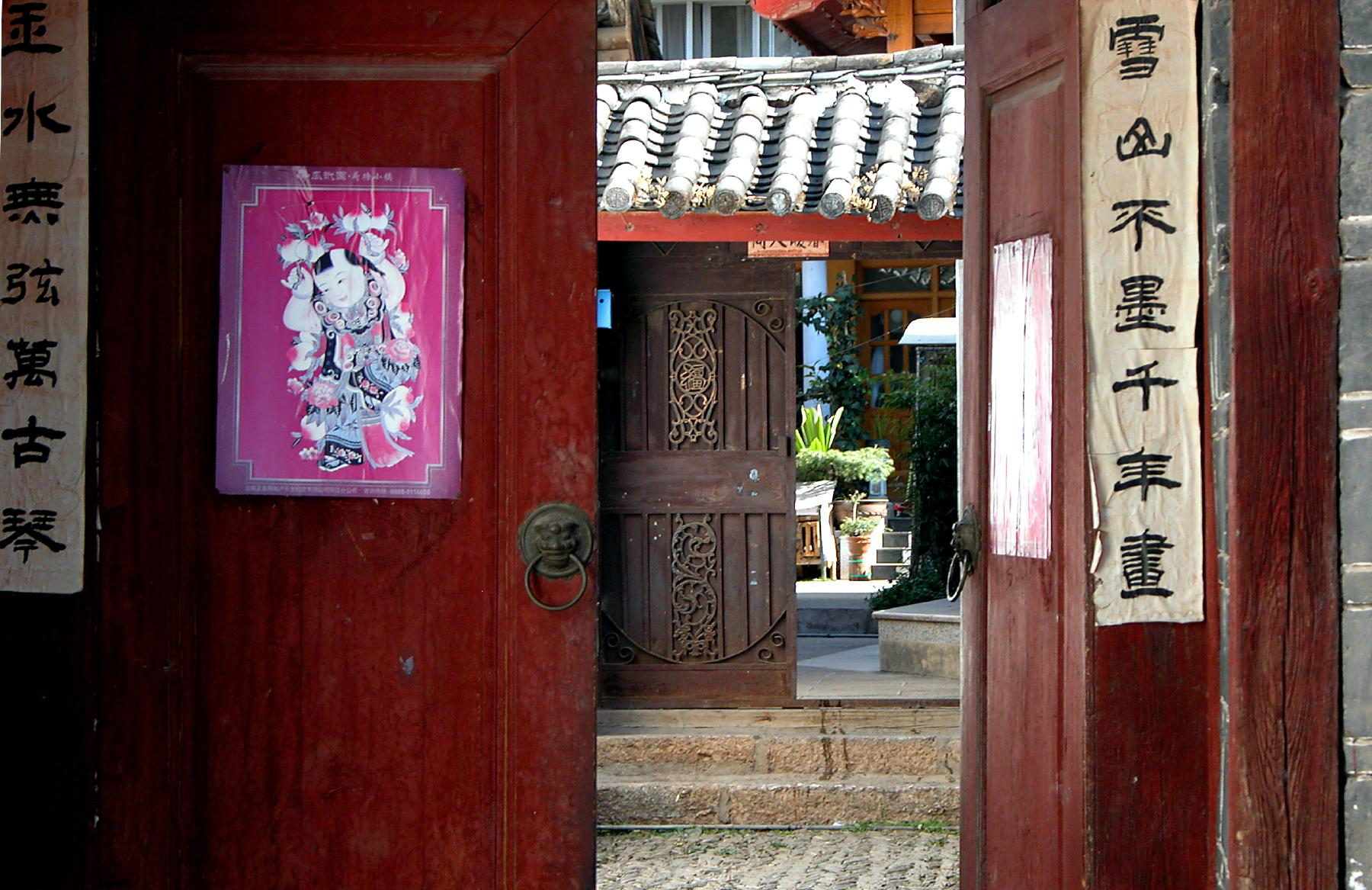
Hand-written Chinese New Year's poetry pasted on the sides of doors leading to people's homes, Lijiang, Yunnan

According to legend, Chinese New Year started with combating a mythical beast called the Nian (a beast that lives under the sea or in the mountains that looks like a lion with horns) during the annual Spring Festival. The Nian would eat villagers, especially children, in the middle of the night. One year, all the villagers decided to hide from the beast. An older man appeared before the villagers and said that he would stay the night and would get revenge on the Nian. The old man put up red papers and set off firecrackers. The day after, the villagers came back to their town and saw that nothing had been destroyed. They assumed that the old man was a deity who had come to save them. The villagers then understood that the Nian was afraid of the colour red and loud noises. As the New Year approached, the tradition grew: villagers wore red clothing, hung red lanterns and spring scrolls on windows and doors, and used firecrackers and drums to frighten away the Nian. From then on, the Nian never came to the village again. The Nian was eventually captured by Hongjun Laozu, an ancient Taoist monk.

== History ==
Before the new year celebration was established, ancient Chinese gathered and celebrated the end of the harvest in autumn. However, this was not the Mid-Autumn Festival, during which the Chinese gathered with family to worship the Moon. In the Classic of Poetry, a poem written during the Western Zhou period (1046 BC – 771 BC) by an anonymous farmer, described the traditions of celebrating the 10th month of the ancient solar calendar, which was in autumn. The poem describes people cleaning millet stacks, offering mijiu (rice wine) to guests, slaughtering lambs, visiting their master's home, toasting him, and expressing wishes for longevity together. The 10th month celebration is believed to be one of the prototypes of Chinese New Year. The records of the first Chinese New Year celebration can be traced to the Warring States period (475 – 221 BC). In the Lüshi Chunqiu, in the Qin state, an exorcism ritual to expel illness, called "Big Nuo", was recorded as being carried out on the last day of the year. Later, Qin unified China, and the Qin dynasty was founded; and the ritual spread. It evolved into the practice of cleaning one's house thoroughly in the days preceding the Chinese New Year.

The first mention of celebrating the start of a new year was recorded during the Han dynasty (202 BC – 220 AD). In the book Simin Yueling (四民月令), written by the Eastern Han agronomist Cui Shi (崔寔), such a celebration was described: "The starting day of the first month is called Zheng Ri. I bring my wife and children to worship ancestors and commemorate my father." Later, he wrote: "Children, wife, grandchildren, and great-grandchildren all serve pepper wine to their parents, make their toast, and wish their parents good health. It's a thriving view." The practice of worshipping ancestors on New Year's Eve is maintained by Chinese people to this day.

Han Chinese also started the custom of visiting acquaintances' homes and wishing each other a happy new year. In Book of the Later Han, volume 27, a county officer was recorded as going to his prefect's house with a government secretary, toasting the prefect, and praising the prefect's merit.

During the Jin dynasty (266–420), people started the New Year's Eve tradition of all-night revelry called shousui (守歲). It was described in an article by Zhou Chu, a general of the Western Jin, Fengtu Ji (風土記, "Notes on Local Conditions"): "At the ending of a year, people gift and wish each other, calling it Kuisui (饋歲, 'time for gifts'); people invited others with drinks and food, calling it Biesui (別歲, 'sending off the year'); on New Year's Eve, people stayed up all night until sunrise, calling it Shousui (守歲, 'guard the year')." The article used the phrase chuxi (除夕) to indicate New Year's Eve—a phrase still used today.

A book of the Northern and Southern dynasties, Jingchu Suishiji, describes the practice of firing bamboo in the early morning of New Year's Day, a New Year's tradition of the ancient Chinese. Poet and chancellor of the Tang dynasty, Lai Gu, also described this tradition in his poem Early Spring (早春): "新曆才將半紙開，小亭猶聚爆竿灰", meaning "Another new year just started as a half-opening paper, and the family gathered around the dust of exploded bamboo poles." The practice was used by ancient Chinese people to scare away evil spirits, since bamboo would noisily crack and explode from being fired.

During the Tang dynasty, people established the custom of sending bai nian tie (拜年帖, "New Year's greetings"), New Year's greeting cards. It is said that the custom was started by Emperor Taizong of Tang. The emperor wrote "普天同慶" ("whole nation celebrates together") on gold leaves and sent them to his ministers. Word of the emperor's gesture spread, and later it became the custom of people in general, who used Xuan paper instead of gold leaves. Another theory is that bai nian tie was derived from the Han dynasty's name tag, men zhuang (門狀, "door opening"). As imperial examinations became essential and reached their heyday under the Tang dynasty, candidates curried favour to become pupils of respected teachers and to get recommendation letters. After obtaining good examination marks, a pupil went to the teacher's home with a men zhuang to convey their gratitude. Eventually, men zhuang became a symbol of good luck, and people started sending them to friends on New Year's Day, calling them by a new name, bai nian tie.

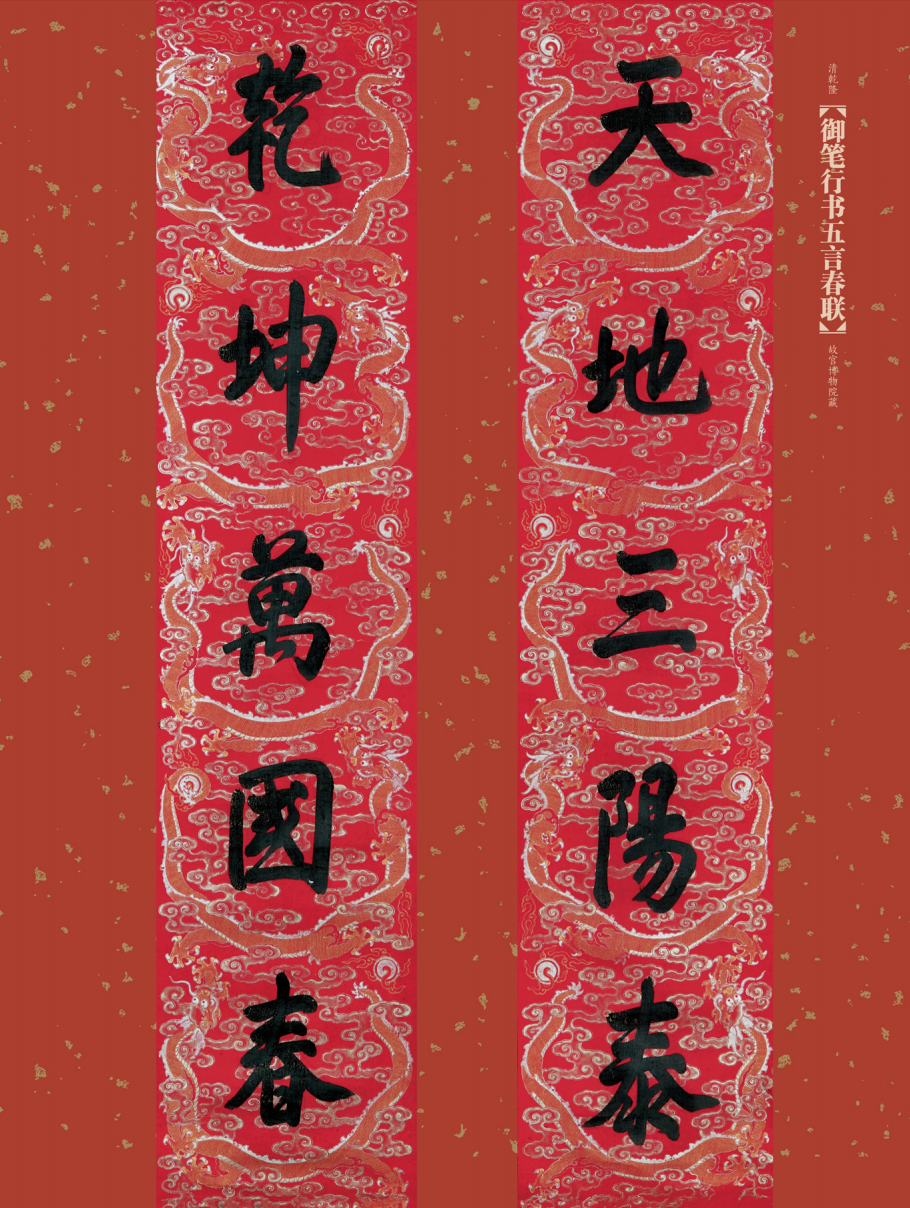
Spring couplets written by the Qianlong Emperor of the Qing dynasty, now stored in The Palace Museum

The Chunlian (Spring Couplets) was written by Meng Chang, an emperor of the Later Shu (935–965 AD), during the Five Dynasties and Ten Kingdoms period："新年納餘慶，嘉節號長春" ("Enjoying past legacies in the new year, the holiday foreseeing the long-lasting spring"). As described by Song dynasty official Zhang Tangying in his book Shu Tao Wu, Volume 2, on the day of New Year's Eve the emperor ordered the scholar Xin Yinxun to write the couplets on peach wood and hang them on the emperor's bedroom door. It is believed that placing the couplets on the door to the home in the days preceding the new year was widespread during the Song dynasty. The famous Northern Song politician, littérateur, philosopher, and poet Wang Anshi recorded the custom in his poem "元日" ("New Year's Day").

爆竹聲中一歲除，
春風送暖入屠蘇。
千門萬戶曈曈日，
總把新桃換舊符。

— 王安石, 元日
Translation:

Amid the sound of firecrackers, a year has come to an end,
The spring wind has wafted warm breath to the Tusu wine.
While the rising sun shines over each and every household,
People get rid of the old couplets and put up the new ones.

— Wang Anshi, New Year's Day

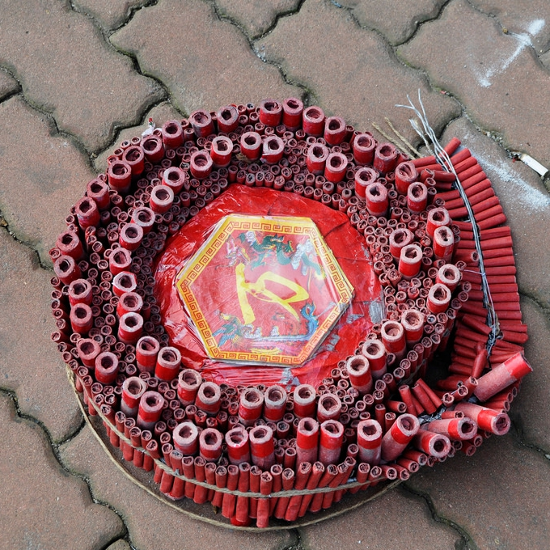
Chinese firecracker

The poem Yuan Ri (元日) also includes the word bao zhu (爆竹, "exploding bamboo"), which is believed to be a reference to firecrackers, instead of the previous tradition of firing bamboo, both of which are called the same in the Chinese language. After gunpowder was invented in the Tang dynasty and widely used under the Song dynasty, people modified the tradition of firing bamboo by filling the bamboo pole with gunpowder, which made for louder explosions. Later, under the Song, people discarded the bamboo and started to use paper to wrap the gunpowder in cylinders, in imitation of the bamboo. The firecracker was still called bao zhu (爆竹), thus equating the new and old traditions. It is also recorded that people linked the firecrackers with hemp rope and created the bian pao (鞭炮, "gunpowder whip") in the Song dynasty. Both bao zhu (爆竹) and bian pao (鞭炮) are still used today to celebrate the Chinese New Year and other festive occasions.

It was also during the Song dynasty that people started to give money to children in celebration of a new year. The money was called sui nian qian (随年钱, "money based on age"). In the chapter, "Ending of a Year" (歲除) in Wulin jiushi (武林舊事), concubines of the emperor prepared a hundred and twenty coins for princes and princesses to wish them longevity.

New Year's celebrations continued under the Yuan dynasty, when people also gave nian gao (年糕, "year cakes") to relatives.

The tradition of eating Chinese dumplings, jiaozi (餃子), was established under the Ming dynasty, at the latest. It is described in the book Youzhongzhi (酌中志): "People get up at 5 in the morning of new year's day, burn incense and light firecrackers, throw door latch or wooden bars in the air three times, drink pepper and thuja wine, eat dumplings. Sometimes put one or two silver currency inside dumplings, and whoever gets the money will attain a year of fortune." Modern Chinese people also put other food that is auspicious into dumplings: such as dates, which prophesy a flourishing new year; candy, which predicts sweet days; and nian gao (年糕, "year cakes"), which foretell a rich life.

In the Qing dynasty, the name ya sui qian (壓歲錢, "New Year's Money") was money given to children during New Year's. The book Qing Jia Lu (清嘉錄) recorded: "elders give children coins threaded together by a red string, and the money is called Ya Sui Qian." The term is still used by Chinese people today. The money was presented in two forms: coins strung on red string or colourful purses filled with coins.

In 1928, the ruling Kuomintang party decreed that Chinese New Year would fall on 1 January of the Gregorian calendar, but this was abandoned due to overwhelming opposition.

=== Suppression during the Cultural Revolution ===
In 1967, during the Cultural Revolution, official Chinese New Year celebrations were banned in China. The State Council of the People's Republic of China announced that the public should "change customs" and have a "revolutionized and fighting Spring Festival". Since people needed to work on Chinese New Year's Eve, they would not need holidays during the Spring Festival. After the Cultural Revolution ended, public celebrations were reinstated.

During the Cultural Revolution, radical groups portrayed the Spring Festival as a bearer of "old customs" rather than a politically neutral holiday. In "Revolutionize the Spring Festival", the Shanghai Revolutionary Workers described the festival as "spiritual shackles" imposed on working people by exploiting classes. The proposal argued that the festival was "heavily tainted" by "feudalism, capitalism, and revisionism". It called on people to act in accordance with Mao Zedong's teachings, and to make the Spring Festival "a target of revolution".

On August 11, 1966, a group of Red Guards published "Let Us Celebrate a 'Proletarian Cultural Revolution Holiday,'" arguing that festivals such as Spring Festival, Mid-Autumn Festival, and Dragon Boat Festival had a "very strong feudal flavour, a widespread baneful influence, and a bad impact." Instead, the proposal argued that traditional festivals should be replaced by holidays with explicit political significance. The "Proletarian Cultural Revolution holiday" proposed to commemorate and celebrate the revolution, with a focus on revolutionizing holidays, including the Spring Festival.

On January 30, 1967, the Shanghai Workers' Revolutionary Rebel General Headquarters, presented a proposal titled "致全国革命造反派和全体革命同志倡议书—破除旧习俗，春节不休假, 展开群众性夺权斗争" (A Proposal to All Revolutionary Rebels and Comrades Nationwide—Break the Old Customs, No Holiday During Spring Festival, Launch a Mass Struggle for Power). The Shanghai rebels claimed that giving workers holidays during the Spring Festival would incite counterrevolutionaries, and sabotage both production and the Cultural Revolution.

People's Daily published a notice that State Council had suspended leave for workers during the Spring Festival of 1967. This was to implement Mao Zedong's policy of "grasping revolution and promoting production." According to the notice, leave for employees wishing to visit relatives during the festival would be made up later.

In early 1969, People's Daily published a report from Shanxi province, describing educated youth who remained in the countryside for the Spring Festival. Sent-down youths settled in Dingxiang County, had proposed that educated youth should spend a "meaningful" and "revolutionary" Spring Festival, alongside poor and lower-middle peasants. Sent-down youths wrote that they found political and ideological importance in their relationship with the poor and lower-middle peasants. Sent-down youths claimed that "no river or sea was as deep as class friendship." The proposal also outlined a five-point Spring Festival plan that included: remaining in the countryside, publicizing Mao Zedong's latest instructions, participating in political struggle, promoting agricultural production, and carrying out propaganda activities centered on politics and frugality.

Red Guards promoted the idea that Mao Zedong wanted his followers to "practice frugality while making revolution". Alongside Mao Zedong's thoughts, the advocacy for a thrifty Spring Festival persisted in 1971. A People's Daily article from that year stated that it was important that people did not partake in banquets, extravagant spending, excessive eating, drinking, and gift giving. These customs embodied the Four Olds and needed to be "broken down" so that the Four News could be established. A member from the Liji Commune who had originally decided to hold a banquet, quickly reconsidered his plan, after learning about the importance of frugality in a Mao Zedong Thought study class. A People's Daily article of 1971, claimed that frugality was not just about living habits, but about the issues that surround class struggle.

There were still families who tried to practice traditional customs, by sending traditional food to family members under investigation. In 1984, Xi Jinping told journalists a story of when he was fifteen during the Cultural Revolution. He explains that he was under investigation because of what he described as his "dissatisfaction with the Cultural Revolution." He recalled that during New Year in 1968, his little brother sent him a plate of traditional dumplings that was quickly confiscated by the Special Case Committee. The Special Case Committee criticized dumplings as reflecting the lifestyle and people of the past.

Historian Fang Xiao describes an example from Hubei Province, in which workers at a reservoir construction site were reportedly not permitted to return home for the Spring Festival. Workers still escaped home at night for the holiday, taking with them the food that was distributed by the local government.

By the late 1970s, official attitudes toward the Spring Festival had begun to shift. The Spring Festival was presented as a needed period of rest for peasants, who worked continuously throughout the year. There were concerns amongst peasants as to why there were no days off during the Spring Festival. Peasants claimed that the Spring Festival is to be a crucial time of rest, and without it, they will lack the strength needed to work. By the end of the Cultural Revolution, the Chinese Government took the initiative to readjust the policies that once prohibited and limited holidays and traditions. By 1980, the Spring Festival was restored as a public holiday.

=== Recognition by the United Nations ===
In 2024, Chinese New Year was added to the Intangible Cultural Heritage of Humanity list by the United Nations Educational, Scientific and Cultural Organisation.

== Public holiday ==
Chinese New Year is observed as a public holiday in some countries and territories, outside of China, with a sizable Chinese population. Since Chinese New Year falls on different days of the week each year, the governments of some of these countries choose to adjust working days to create a longer public holiday. In certain countries, a statutory holiday is added on the following workday if the New Year (as a public holiday) falls on a weekend. For example, in 2013, New Year's Eve (9 February) fell on a Saturday and New Year's Day (10 February) on a Sunday. The holiday may be referred to by different names depending on the country: common English terms include "Chinese New Year", "Lunar New Year", "New Year Festival", and "Spring Festival".

For New Year celebrations that follow Chinese-inspired calendars but are outside of China and the Chinese diaspora (such as Korea's Seollal and Vietnam's Tết), see the article on Lunar New Year.

For other countries and regions where the Chinese New Year is celebrated but not as an official holiday, see the table below.

Country/region	Official name	Description	No. of days
Malaysia	Tahun Baru Cina	The first 2 days of Chinese New Year.	2
Singapore	Chinese New Year	The first 2 days of Chinese New Year.	2
Brunei	Tahun Baru Cina	Half-day on Chinese New Year's Eve and the first day of Chinese New Year.	1
Hong Kong	Lunar New Year	The first 3 days of Chinese New Year.	3
Macau	Novo Ano Lunar	The first 3 days of Chinese New Year	3
Indonesia	Tahun Baru Imlek (Sin Cia)	The first day of Chinese New Year and a joint holiday either on Chinese New Year's Eve or on the second day.	2
China	Spring Festival (Chūn Jié)	The eve and first 3 days of Chinese New Year. Extra holiday days are de facto added adjusting the weekend days before and after the three days holiday, resulting in a full week of public holiday known as Golden Week. During the Chunyun holiday travel season.	4 (official holiday days); 7 (de facto holiday days)
Myanmar	Chinese New Year	The first day of Chinese New Year.	1
Philippines	Chinese New Year	Half-day on Chinese New Year's Eve and the first day of Chinese New Year.	1
South Korea	Korean New Year (Seollal)	The first 3 days of Chinese New Year.	3
Taiwan	Lunar New Year	Chinese New Year's Eve and the first 3 days of Chinese New Year; will be made up on subsequent working days if any of the 4 days fall on Saturday or Sunday. The day before Chinese New Year's Eve is also designated as holiday, but as a bridge holiday, and will be made up on an earlier or later Saturday. Additional bridge holidays may apply, resulting in 9-day or 10-day weekends.	4 (legally); 9–10 (including Saturdays and Sundays)
Thailand	Wan Trut Chin (Chinese New Year's Day)	Observed by Thai Chinese and parts of the private sector. Usually celebrated for three days, starting on the day before the Chinese New Year's Eve. Chinese New Year is observed as a public holiday in Narathiwat, Pattani, Yala, Satun and Songkhla Provinces.	1
Vietnam	Tết Nguyên Đán (Vietnamese New Year)	The first 3 days of Lunar New Year.	3
New York, United States	Lunar New Year	The first day of Lunar New Year.	1
California, United States	Lunar New Year	The first day of Lunar New Year.	1
Suriname	Maan Nieuwjaar	The first day of Chinese New Year.	1

== Festivities ==
Red couplets and red lanterns are displayed on the door frames and light up the atmosphere. The air is filled with strong Chinese emotions. In stores in Beijing, Shanghai, Wuhan, and other cities, products of traditional Chinese style have started to lead fashion trend[s]. Buy yourself a Chinese-style coat, get your kids tiger-head hats and shoes, and decorate your home with some beautiful red Chinese knots, then you will have an authentic Chinese-style Spring Festival.

— Xinwen Lianbo, January 2001, quoted by Li Ren, Imagining China in the Era of Global Consumerism and Local Consciousness

=== Preceding days ===
On the eighth day of the lunisolar month before the Chinese New Year, the Laba Festival, a traditional porridge, Laba porridge (simplified Chinese: 腊八粥; traditional Chinese: 臘八粥; pinyin: làbā zhōu), is served in remembrance of an ancient festival, called La, that occurred shortly after the winter solstice. Pickles such as Laba garlic, which turns green from vinegar, are made on this day. For those who practice Buddhism, the Laba holiday is also considered Bodhi Day. Layue (simplified Chinese: 腊月; traditional Chinese: 臘月; pinyin: Làyuè) is a term often associated with Chinese New Year as it refers to the sacrifices held in honour of the gods in the twelfth lunisolar month; hence, the cured meats of Chinese New Year are known as larou (simplified Chinese: 腊肉; traditional Chinese: 臘肉; pinyin: làròu). The porridge was prepared by the women of the household at first light, with the first bowl offered to the family's ancestors and the household deities. Every member of the family was then served a bowl, with leftovers distributed to relatives and friends. It is still served as a special breakfast on this day in some Chinese homes. The concept of the "La month" is similar to Advent in Christianity. Many families eat vegetarian meals on Chinese New Year's Eve, and the garlic and preserved meat are eaten on Chinese New Year Day.

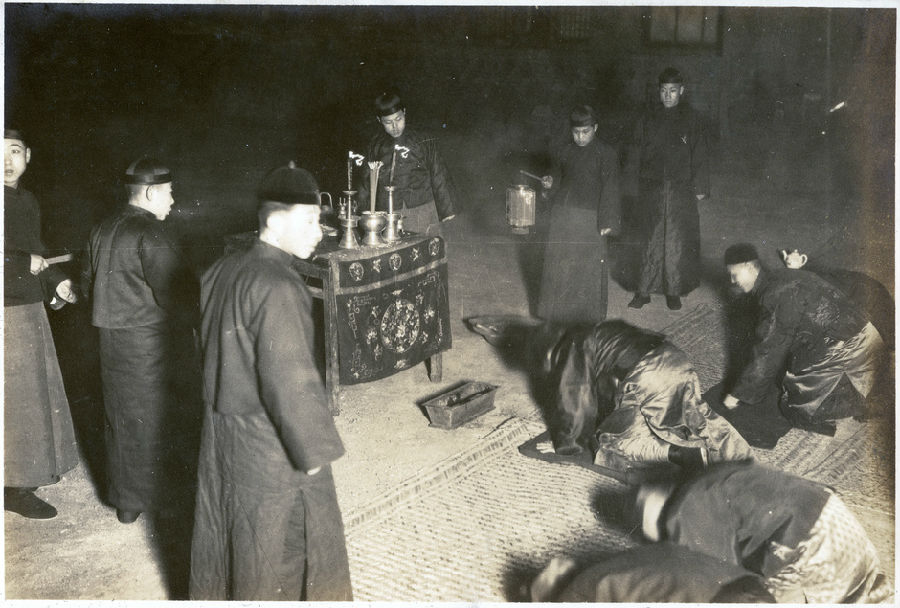
Men gathering to receive the Gods in the Chinese New Year, 1900s

On the days immediately before the new year celebration, Chinese families give their homes a thorough cleaning. There is a Cantonese saying "Wash away the dirt on nin ya baat" (Chinese: 年廿八，洗邋遢; pinyin: nián niàn bā, xǐ lātà; Jyutping: nin4 jaa6 baat3, sai2 laap6 taap3 (laat6 taat3), the 28th day of month 12), but the practice is not restricted to nin ya baat. It is believed that the cleaning sweeps away the bad luck of the preceding year and prepares homes for good luck. Brooms and dust pans are put away on the first day so that the newly arrived good luck cannot be swept away. Some people give their homes, doors, and window-frames a new coat of red paint; decorators and paper-hangers experience a year-end rush of business before the Chinese New Year. Homes are often decorated with paper cutouts of Chinese auspicious phrases and couplets. Purchasing new clothing and shoes also symbolizes a new start. Any haircuts need to be completed before the New Year, as cutting hair on New Year is considered bad luck due to the homonymic nature of the word "hair" (fa) and the word for "prosperity". Businesses are expected to pay off all the debts outstanding for the year before New Year's Eve, including debts of gratitude. Thus, it is a common practice to send gifts and rice to close business associates and extended family members.

In many households where Buddhism or Taoism is observed, home altars and statues are cleaned thoroughly, and decorations used to adorn altars over the past year are taken down and burned a week before the new year starts on Little New Year, to be replaced with new decorations. Taoists (and Buddhists to a lesser extent) will also "send gods back to heaven" (Chinese: 送神; pinyin: sòngshén): an example would be burning a paper effigy of the Kitchen God, the recorder of family functions. This is done so that the Kitchen God can report to the Jade Emperor of the family household's transgressions and good deeds. Families often offer sweet foods (such as candy) to "bribe" the deities into reporting good things about the family.

Before the Reunion Dinner, a prayer of thanksgiving is held to mark the safe passage of the previous year. Confucianists take the opportunity to remember their ancestors, and those who had lived before them are revered. Some people do not offer a Buddhist prayer due to the influence of Christianity, with a Christian prayer offered instead.

=== Chinese New Year's Eve ===
The day before Chinese New Year is usually accompanied by a dinner feast, consisting of special meats as a main course and an offering for the New Year. This meal is comparable to Thanksgiving dinner or Christmas dinner.

In Northern China, it is customary to make jiaozi or dumplings, which are eaten at midnight. Dumplings symbolize wealth because their shape resembles a Chinese sycee otherwise known as Yuan Bao or ingots in English. In the South, it is customary to make a rice cake from glutinous rice flour (niangao) and send pieces of it as gifts to relatives and friends in the coming days as the word Nian means year, and Gao is the same phonetics for cake as well as "higher", therefore well wishes of a better year ahead by eating Nian Gao

Some families visit local temples hours before midnight to pray for success and by lighting the first incense of the year. Today, many households hold parties. Traditionally, firecrackers were lit to ward off evil spirits. The household doors are sealed and not reopened until dawn in a ritual called "opening the door of fortune" (simplified Chinese: 开财门; traditional Chinese: 開財門; pinyin: kāicáimén). The tradition of staying up late on Chinese New Year's Eve is known as shousui (Chinese: 守岁). It is still practised and believed to add to parental longevity.

=== First day ===
The first day, known as the "Spring Festival" (simplified Chinese: 春节; traditional Chinese: 春節), is for the welcoming of the deities of the heavens and Earth at midnight. It is a traditional practice to light fireworks, burn bamboo sticks and firecrackers, and perform a lion dance to ward off evil spirits.

Typical actions such as lighting fires and using knives are considered taboo; thus, all consumable food has to be cooked beforehand. Using the broom, swearing, and breaking any dinnerware without appeasing the deities are also considered taboo.

Normal traditions occurring on the first day involve house gatherings for families, specifically the elders and families to the oldest and most senior members of their extended families, usually their parents, grandparents, and great-grandparents, and trading Mandarin oranges as a courtesy to symbolize wealth and good luck. Members of the family who are married also give red envelopes containing cash known as lai see (Cantonese: 利事) or angpow (Hokkien and Teochew), or hongbao (Mandarin: 红包), a form of a blessing and to suppress both the ageing and other challenges that were associated with the coming year, to junior members of the family, mostly children and teenagers. Business managers may also give bonuses in the form of red packets to employees. The money can be of any form, specifically in numbers ending with 8 (Mandarin: ba 八), which sounds similar to fa (Mandarin: 发), meaning prosperity; but packets with denominations of odd or unlucky numbers, or packets without money, are usually not allowed due to bad luck. The number 4 is especially unlucky, because it sounds similar to si (Mandarin: 死), which means death.

While fireworks and firecrackers are traditionally very popular, some regions have banned them due to concerns over fire hazards. For this reason, various city governments (e.g., Kowloon, Beijing, Shanghai for a number of years) have issued bans on fireworks and firecrackers in certain precincts of the city. As a substitute, large-scale fireworks displays have been sponsored by governments in Hong Kong and Singapore.

=== Second day ===
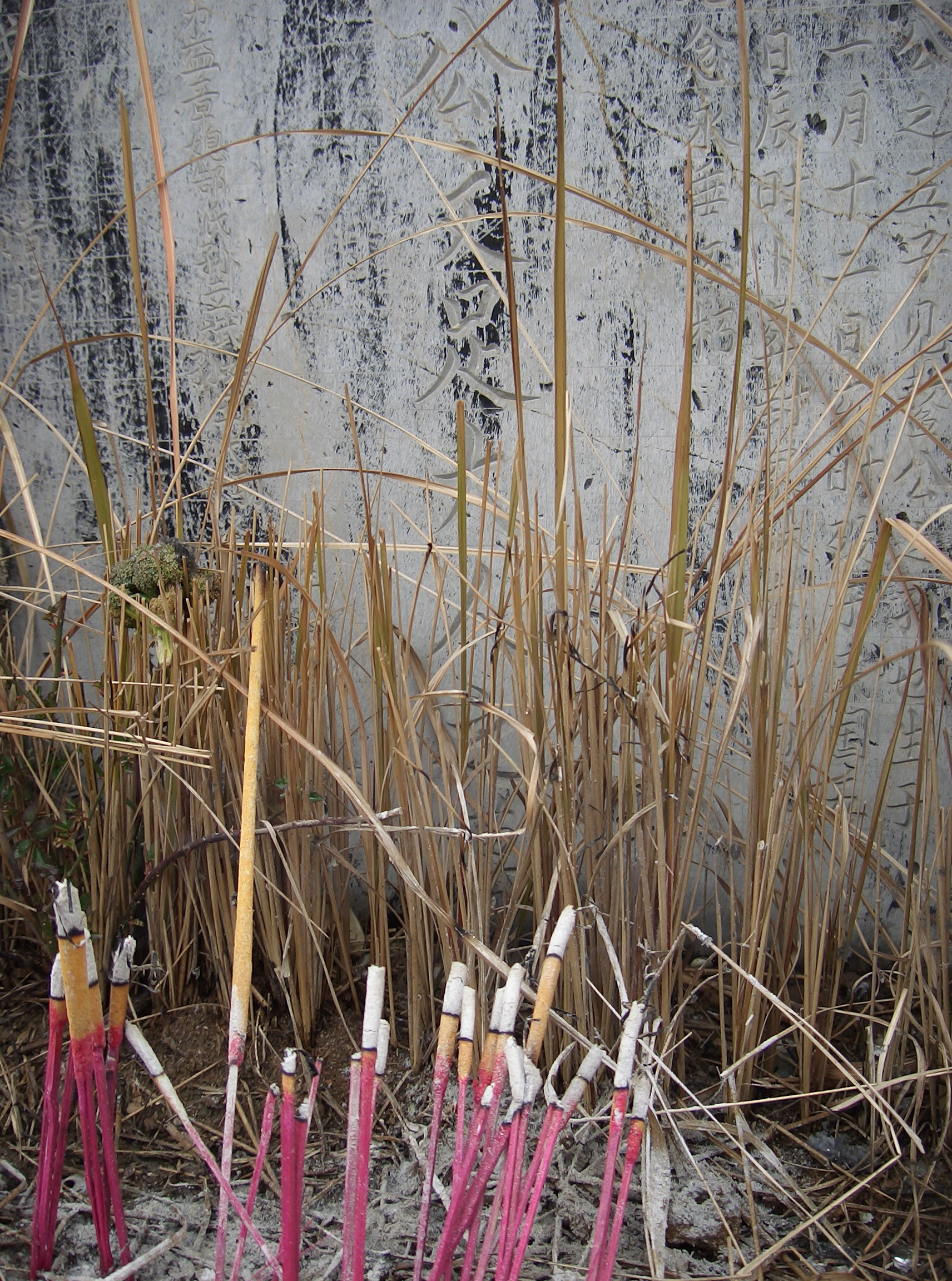
Incense is burned at the graves of ancestors as part of the offering and prayer rituals

The second day, entitled "a year's beginning" (simplified Chinese: 开年; traditional Chinese: 開年; pinyin: kāinián), sees married daughters visiting their birth parents, relatives, and close friends, often renewing family ties and relationships. (Traditionally, married daughters didn't have the opportunity to visit their birth families frequently.)

The second day also saw giving offering money and sacrifices to the God of Wealth (Chinese: 财神) to symbolize a rewarding time after hardship in the preceding year. During the days of imperial China, "beggars and other unemployed people circulate[d] from family to family, carrying a picture [of the God of Wealth] shouting, 'Cai Shen dao!' [The God of Wealth has come!]." Householders would respond with "lucky money" to reward the messengers. Business people of the Cantonese dialect group will hold a Hoi Nin prayer to start their business on the second day of the Chinese New Year, blessing their business to thrive in the coming year.

As this day is believed to be The Birthday of Che Kung, a deity worshipped in Hong Kong, worshippers go to Che Kung Temples to pray for his blessing. A representative from the government asks Che Kung about the city's fortune through kau cim.

=== Third day ===
The third day is known as "red mouth", or Chikou (Chinese: 赤口; pinyin: Chìkǒu), which is also called "Chigou's Day" (Chinese: 赤狗日; pinyin: Chìgǒurì). Chigou, literally "red dog", is an epithet of "the God of Blazing Wrath" (Chinese: 熛怒之神; pinyin: Biāo nù zhī shén). Rural villagers continue the tradition of burning paper offerings over trash fires. It is considered an unlucky day to have guests or go visiting because quarrels happen on this day. Hakka villagers in rural Hong Kong in the 1960s called it the Day of the Poor Devil and believed everyone should stay at home. This is also considered a propitious day to visit the temple of the God of Wealth and have one's future told.

=== Fourth day ===
In communities that celebrate Chinese New Year for 15 days, the fourth day marks the beginning of corporate "spring dinners" and the return to normal business operations. In other regions with a longer Chinese New Year holiday, celebrations include welcoming back the gods who were previously sent off on this day.

=== Fifth day ===
This day, powu (Chinese: 破五; pinyin: pòwǔ), is the birthday of the God of Wealth, also known as Guan Yu. In northern China, people eat jiaozi, or dumplings, in the morning.

In China, it is also common that on the 5th day people will shoot off firecrackers to get Guan Yu's attention, thus ensuring his favour and good fortune for the new year.

=== Sixth day ===
On the sixth day, known as Horse's Day, people drive away the Ghost of Poverty by discarding the garbage accumulated during the festival. The methods may vary, but they essentially convey the same meaning: to dispel the Ghost of Poverty. This practice reflects the common desire among the Chinese people to bid farewell to the old and welcome the new year, to rid themselves of past poverty and hardships, and to usher in a prosperous and auspicious life in the new year.

=== Seventh day ===
The seventh day, traditionally known as Renri (the common person's birthday), is the day when everyone grows one year older. In some overseas Chinese communities in Southeast Asia, such as Malaysia and Singapore, it is also the day when tossed raw fish salad, yusheng, is eaten for continued wealth and prosperity.

For many Chinese Buddhists, this is another day to avoid meat, as the seventh day commemorates the birth of Sakra, lord of the Devas in Buddhist cosmology, who is analogous to the Jade Emperor.

=== Eighth day ===
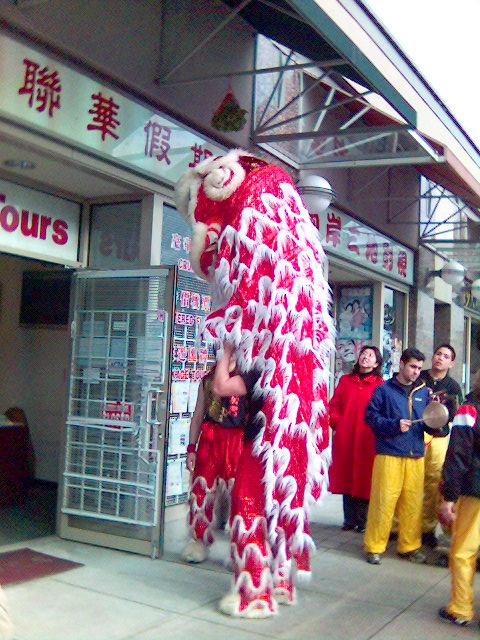
Chinese New Year's celebrations, on the eighth day, in the Metro Vancouver suburb of Richmond, British Columbia, Canada

Another family dinner is held to celebrate the eve of the birth of the Jade Emperor, the ruler of heaven. People typically return to work by the eighth day. Therefore, store owners will host a lunch or dinner for their employees, expressing gratitude for the work they have done throughout the year.

=== Ninth day ===
The ninth day is traditionally the birthday of the Jade Emperor of Heaven (Chinese: 玉皇; pinyin: Yù Huáng), and many people pray to the Taoist Pantheon in thanks or gratitude. The day is commonly known as Ti Kong Dan (Chinese: 天公誕; Pe̍h-ōe-jī: Thiⁿ-kong Tan), Ti Kong Si (Chinese: 天公生; Pe̍h-ōe-jī: Thiⁿ-kong Siⁿ/Thiⁿ-kong Seⁿ), or Pai Ti Kong (Chinese: 拜天公; Pe̍h-ōe-jī: Pài Thiⁿ-kong), and is especially important to Hokkiens.

A prominent requisite offering is sugarcane. Legends hold that the Hokkien were spared from a massacre by Japanese pirates by hiding in a sugarcane plantation, between the eighth and ninth days of the Chinese New Year, coinciding with the Jade Emperor's birthday. "Sugarcane" (Chinese: 甘蔗; Pe̍h-ōe-jī: kam-chià) is a near homonym to "thank you" (Chinese: 感謝; Pe̍h-ōe-jī: kám-siā) in the Hokkien dialect.

=== Tenth day ===
Some celebrate the Jade Emperor's birthday on this day.

=== Fifteenth day ===
The fifteenth day of the new year is celebrated as the Lantern Festival, also known as the Yuanxiao Festival (simplified Chinese: 元宵节; traditional Chinese: 元宵節; pinyin: Yuán xiāo jié), the Shangyuan Festival (simplified Chinese: 上元节; traditional Chinese: 上元節; pinyin: Shàng yuán jié), and Chap Goh Meh (Chinese: 十五暝; Pe̍h-ōe-jī: Cha̍p-gō͘-mê; lit. 'the fifteen night' in Hokkien). Rice dumplings, or tangyuan (simplified Chinese: 汤圆; traditional Chinese: 湯圓; pinyin: tang yuán), a sweet glutinous rice ball brewed in soup, are eaten this day. Candles are lit outside houses as a way to guide wayward spirits home. Families may walk the streets carrying lanterns, which sometimes have riddles attached to or written on them as a tradition.

In China and Malaysia, this day is celebrated by individuals seeking a romantic partner, akin to Valentine's Day. Nowadays, single women write their contact numbers on mandarin oranges and throw them into a river or a lake, after which single men collect the oranges and eat them. The taste serves as an indication of their potential love life: a sweet taste represents good fortune, while a sour taste represents a less favorable outcome.

This day often marks the end of the Chinese New Year festivities.

== Traditional food ==
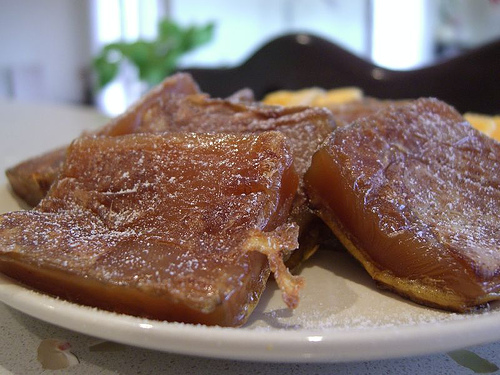
One version of niangao, New Year rice cake

A reunion dinner is held on New Year's Eve, during which family members gather for a celebration. The venue will usually be in or near the home of the most senior member of the family. The New Year's Eve dinner is very large and sumptuous and traditionally includes dishes of meat (namely, pork and chicken) and fish. Most reunion dinners also feature a communal hot pot, as it is believed to signify the coming together of the family members for the meal. Reunion dinners (particularly in the Southern regions) may prominently feature specialty meats (e.g. wax-cured meats such as duck and Chinese sausage) and seafood (e.g. lobster and abalone) that are usually reserved for special occasions. In most areas, fish (simplified Chinese: 鱼; traditional Chinese: 魚; pinyin: yú) is included, but not eaten completely (and the remainder is stored overnight), as the Chinese phrase "may there be surpluses every year" (simplified Chinese: 年年有余; traditional Chinese: 年年有餘; pinyin: niánnián yǒu yú) sounds the same as "let there be fish every year". Eight individual dishes are served to reflect the belief in good fortune being associated with the number. If in the previous year a death was experienced in the family, seven dishes are served.

Other traditional foods consist of noodles, fruits, dumplings, spring rolls, and Tangyuan, which are also known as sweet rice balls. Each dish served during Chinese New Year represents something special. The noodles used to make longevity noodles are usually very thin, long wheat noodles, which are longer than normal noodles, and are usually fried and served on a plate, or boiled and served in a bowl with their broth. The noodles symbolize the wish for a long life. The fruits that are typically selected would be oranges, tangerines, and pomelos, as they are round and "golden" in color, symbolizing fullness and wealth. The pronunciations of these Chinese words are said to harbor luck and prosperity, such as the Chinese pronunciation for orange (橙 chéng), which sounds the same as the Chinese for 'success' (成 chéng). The pomelo, which is believed to bring constant prosperity, also has a pronunciation that symbolize good luck. The Chinese word for pomelos (柚 yòu) sounds similar to 'to have' (有 yǒu); disregarding its tone, however, it sounds exactly like 'again' (又 yòu). Certain Chinese characters can represent luck as well, such as the Chinese word for tangerine (桔 jú), which contains the Chinese character for luck (吉 jí). Additionally, dumplings and spring rolls symbolize wealth, whereas sweet rice balls symbolize family togetherness.

Red envelopes may be distributed during the reunion dinner to the immediate family. These packets contain money in an amount that reflects good luck and honorability. Several foods are consumed to usher in wealth, happiness, and good fortune. Several of the Chinese food names are homophones for words that also mean good things.

Many families in China still follow the tradition of eating only vegetarian food on the first day of the new year, as it is believed that doing so will bring good luck into their lives for the whole year.

Like many other New Year dishes, certain ingredients that have names that relate to long life, prosperity, or wealth also take precedence over others.

Food item	Simplified Chinese	Traditional Chinese	Hanyu Pinyin	Description
Buddha's delight	罗汉斋	羅漢齋	Luóhàn zhāi	An elaborate vegetarian dish served by Chinese families on the eve and the first day of the New Year. A type of black hair-like algae, pronounced "fat choy" in Cantonese, is also featured in the dish for its name, which sounds like "prosperity". Hakkas usually serve kiu nyuk (Chinese: 扣肉; pinyin: kòuròu) and ngiong teu fu.
Chicken	鸡	雞	Jī	Boiled chicken is served because it is figured that any family, no matter how humble their circumstances, can afford a chicken for the Chinese New Year.
Apples	苹果	蘋果	Píngguǒ	Apples symbolize peace because the word for apple ("ping") is a homonym of the word for peace.
Fish	鱼	魚	Yú	Is usually eaten or merely displayed on the eve of the Chinese New Year. The pronunciation of fish makes it a homophone for "surpluses" (simplified Chinese: 余; traditional Chinese: 餘; pinyin: yú).
Garlic	蒜		Suàn	Is usually served in a dish with rondelles of Chinese sausage or Chinese cured meat during the Chinese New Year. The pronunciation of Garlic makes it a homophone for "calculating (money)" (Chinese: 算; pinyin: suàn). The Chinese cured meat is so chosen because it is traditionally the primary method for storing meat over the winter, and the meat rondelles resemble coins.
Jau gok	油角		Yóu jiǎo	The main Chinese New Year dumpling for Cantonese families. It is believed to resemble a sycee or yuánbǎo, the old Chinese gold and silver ingots, and to represent prosperity for the coming year.
Jiaozi	饺子	餃子	Jiǎozi	The common dumpling eaten in northern China, also believed to resemble sycee. At the reunion dinner, Chinese people add various foods into Jiaozi fillings to represent good fortune: coins, Niangao, dried dates, candy, etc.
Mandarin oranges	桔子		Júzi	Oranges, particularly mandarin oranges, are a common fruit during the Chinese New Year. They are particularly associated with the festival in southern China, where its name is a homophone of the word for "luck" in dialects such as Teochew (in which 橘, jú, and 吉, jí, are both pronounced gik).
Melon seed/Guazi	瓜子		Guāzi	Other variations include sunflower, pumpkin and other seeds. It symbolizes fertility and having many children.
Niangao	年糕		Niángāo	Most popular in eastern China (Jiangsu, Zhejiang and Shanghai) because its pronunciation is a homophone for "a more prosperous year (年高 lit. year high)". Niangao is also popular in the Philippines, where there is a large Chinese population and is known as tikoy (Chinese: 甜粿, from Min Nan) there. Known as the Chinese New Year pudding, niangao is made up of glutinous rice flour, wheat starch, salt, water, and sugar. The color of the sugar used determines the color of the pudding (white or brown).
Noodles	面条	麵條	Miàntiáo	Families may serve uncut noodles (making them as long as they can), which represent longevity and long life, though this practice is not limited to the new year.
Sweets	糖果		Tángguǒ	Sweets and similar dried fruit goods are stored in a red or black Chinese candy box.
Rougan (Yok Gon)	肉干	肉乾	Ròugān	Chinese salty-sweet dried meat, akin to jerky, which is trimmed of the fat, sliced, marinated, and then smoked for later consumption or as a gift.
Taro cakes	芋头糕	芋頭糕	Yùtougāo	Made from the vegetable taro, the cakes are cut into squares and often fried.
Turnip cakes	萝卜糕	蘿蔔糕	Luóbogāo	A dish made of shredded radish and rice flour, usually fried and cut into small squares.
Yusheng or Yee sang	鱼生	魚生	Yúshēng	Raw fish salad. Eating this salad is said to bring good luck. This dish is usually eaten on the seventh day of the New Year, but may also be eaten throughout the period.
Five Xinpan	五辛盘	五辛盤	Wǔ xīnpán	Five Xin include onion, garlic, pepper, ginger, and mustard. As an ancient traditional folk culture, it has existed since the Jin dynasty. It symbolizes health. In a positive economic growth dynasty, like Song, The Five Xinpan would not only have five spicy vegetables but would also include Chinese bacon and other vegetables. Moreover, it was offered to the family's ancestors to express respect and seek a blessing.
Laba porridge	腊八粥	臘八粥	Làbā zhōu	This dish is eaten on Laba Festival, the eighth day of the twelfth month of the Chinese lunisolar calendar. The congees are made of mixed walnut, pine nuts, mushrooms, and persimmon. The congees are for commemorating the sacrifices of ancestors and celebrating the harvest.

== Practices ==
=== Red envelopes ===
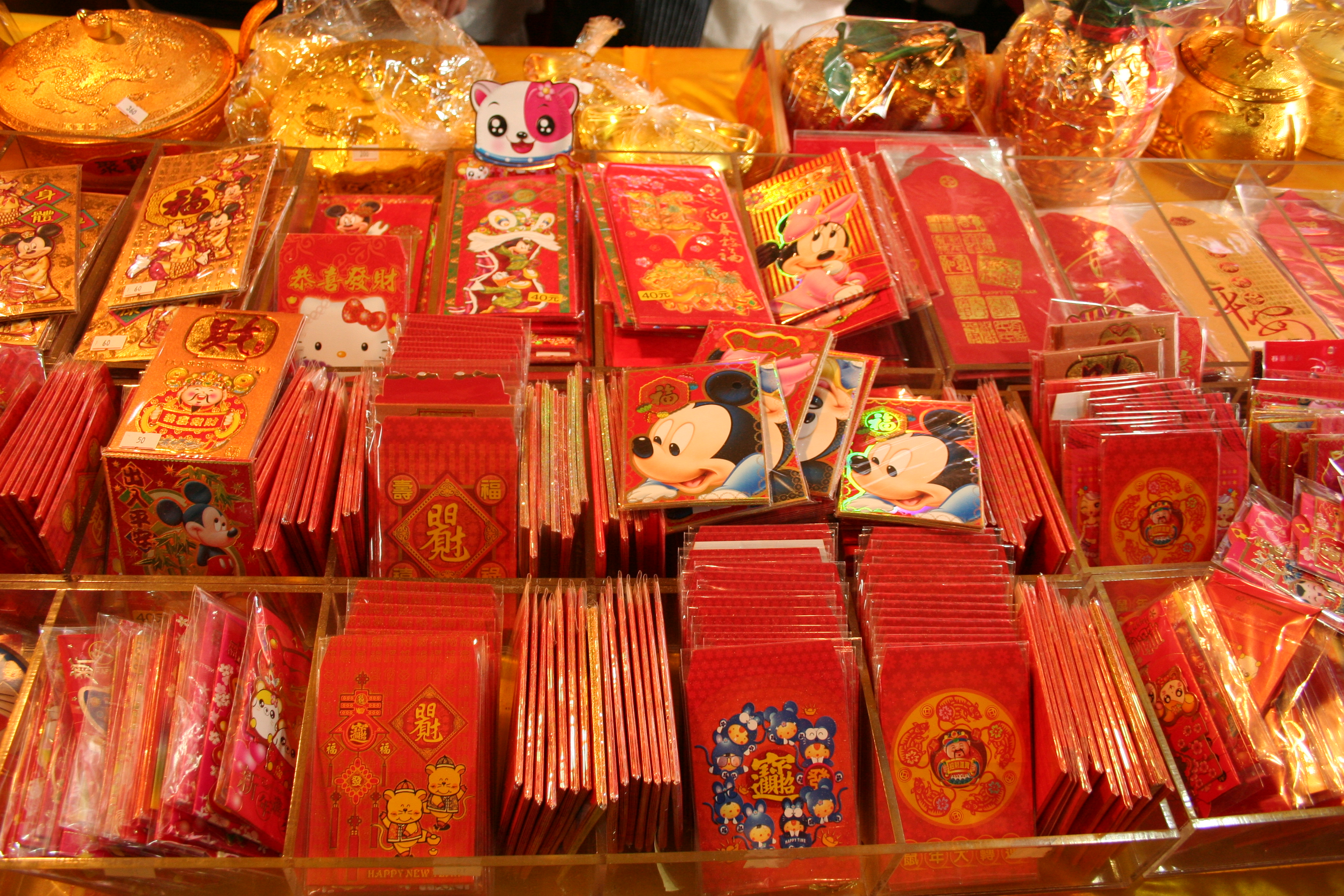
Red packets for sale in a market in Taipei, Taiwan, before the Year of the Rat

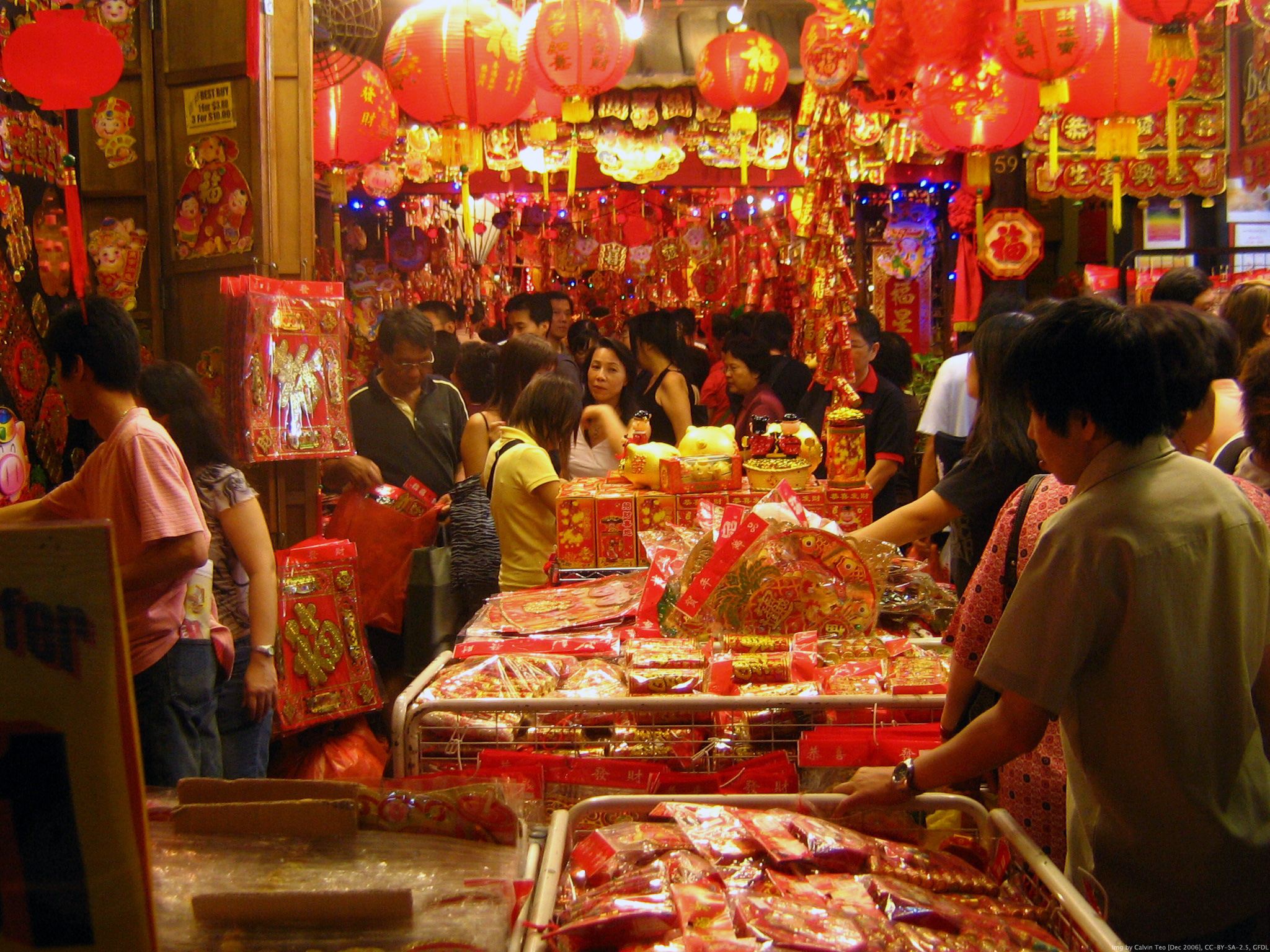
Shoppers at a New Year market in Chinatown, Singapore

Traditionally, red envelopes or red packets (traditional Chinese: 紅包; simplified Chinese: 红包; Mandarin pinyin: hóngbāo; Hokkien Pe̍h-ōe-jī: âng-pau; Hakka Pha̍k-fa-sṳ: fùng-pâu), alternatively known as lai see, particularly in Cantonese-speaking areas (Chinese: 利是 / 利市 / 利事; Cantonese Yale: laih sih; pinyin: lìshì), are passed out during the Chinese New Year's celebrations, from married couples or the elderly to unmarried juniors or children. During this period, red packets are also known as yasuiqian (壓歲錢; 压岁钱; yāsuìqián), which evolved from a homophonous phrase yasuiqian (壓祟錢; 压祟钱; yāsuìqián), literally meaning "money to suppress evil spirits". According to legend, a demon named Sui would pat a child on the head three times on New Year's Eve, causing the child to have a fever. In response, parents wrapped coins in red paper and placed them next to their children's pillows. When Sui approached, the flash of the coins scared him away. Since then, on every New Year's Eve, parents have wrapped coins in red paper to protect their children.

Red packets almost always contain money. Chinese superstitions favour amounts that begin with even numbers, such as 8 (八, pinyin: bā), a homophone for "wealth", and 6 (六, pinyin: liù), a homophone for "smooth"—but not the number 4 (四, pinyin: sì), which is a homophone of "death", and is, as such, considered unlucky in Asian culture. Odd numbers are also avoided, as they are associated with cash given during funerals (帛金, pinyin: báijīn). It is also customary for bills placed inside a red envelope to be new.

A request for red packets (Mandarin: 討紅包; tǎo hóngbāo, Cantonese: 逗利是; dauh laih sih) wouldn't be refused by a married person as it would mean that he or she would be "out of luck" in the new year. Red packets are generally given by married couples to the younger unmarried members of the family. It is customary and polite for children to wish elders a happy new year and a year of happiness, health, and good fortune before accepting the red envelope. Red envelopes are then kept under the pillow and slept on for seven nights after the Chinese New Year, before opening, because that symbolizes good luck and fortune.

In the mid-2010s, Chinese messaging apps such as WeChat popularized the distribution of red envelopes in a virtual format via mobile payments, usually within group chats. In 2017, it was estimated that over 100 billion of these virtual red envelopes would be sent over the New Year holiday.

==== Combating demons ====
In ancient times, there was a monster named sui (祟) which came out on New Year's Eve and touched the heads of sleeping children. The child would be frightened by the touch and wake up and have a fever. The fever would eventually cause the child to have intellectual disabilities. Hence, families will light up their homes and stay awake, leading to a tradition of shou sui (守祟), to guard against sui harming their children.

A folklore tale of sui is about an elderly couple with a precious son. On the night of New Year's Eve, since they were afraid that sui would come, they took out eight pieces of copper coins to play with their son to keep him awake. Their son was very sleepy, however, so they let him go to sleep after placing a red paper bag containing the copper coins under the child's pillow. The two older children also stayed with him for the whole night. Suddenly, the doors and windows were blown open by a strange wind, and even the candlelight was extinguished. It turned out to be a sui. When the sui was going to reach out and touch the child's head, the pillow suddenly brightened with the golden light, and the sui was scared away, so the exorcism effect of "red paper wrapped copper money" spread in China (see also Chinese numismatic charms). The money was then called ya sui qian (壓祟錢), the money to suppress sui.

Another tale recounts a village terrorized by a huge demon that none could defeat; numerous warriors and statesmen had attempted to do, to no avail. A young orphan, wielding a magical sword passed down from his ancestors, confronted and battled the demon, ultimately slaying it. With the demon vanquished, peace returned to the village, and in gratitude, the elders bestowed upon the courageous young man a red envelope filled with money as a token of appreciation for his valor and for freeing the village from the demon's menace.

=== Gift exchange ===
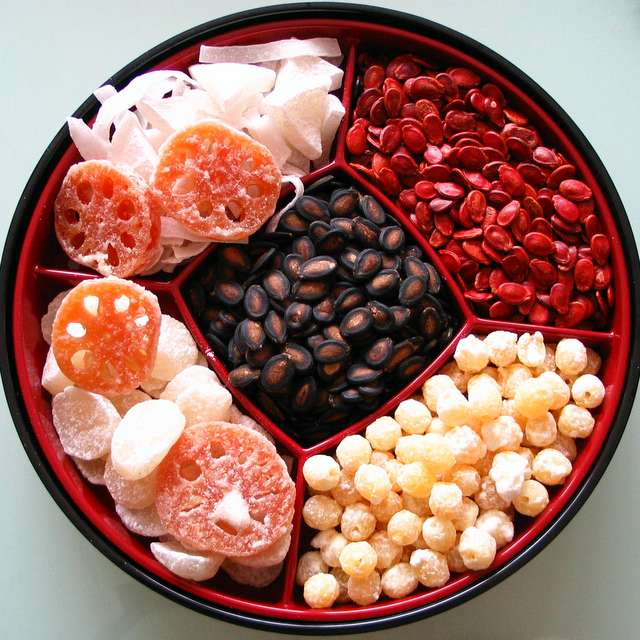
Chinese candy box

In addition to red envelopes, typically given from older individuals to younger ones, small gifts such as food or sweets are exchanged between friends or relatives from different households during Chinese New Year. These gifts are often brought when visiting friends or relatives at their homes. Common gifts include fruits (especially oranges, but never pears), cakes, biscuits, chocolates, and candies. It is customary for gifts to be wrapped in red or golden paper, symbolizing good luck.

Certain items should not be given, as they are considered taboo. Taboo gifts include:

- items associated with funerals (i.e. handkerchiefs, towels, chrysanthemums, items coloured white and black)
- items that show that time is running out (i.e. clocks and watches)
- sharp objects that symbolize cutting a tie (i.e. scissors and knives)
- items that symbolize that you want to walk away from a relationship (examples: shoes and sandals)
- mirrors
- homonyms for unpleasant topics (examples: "clock" sounds like "the funeral ritual" or "the end of life", green hats because "wear a green hat" sounds like "cuckold", "handkerchief" sounds like "goodbye", "pear" sounds like "separate", "umbrella" sounds like "disperse", and "shoe" sounds like a "rough" year)

=== Markets ===
Markets or village fairs are set up as the New Year approaches. These usually open-air markets feature New Year–related products such as flowers, toys, clothing, and even fireworks and firecrackers. It is convenient for people to buy gifts for their New Year visits as well as their home decorations at these markets. In some places, the practice of shopping for the perfect plum tree is not dissimilar to the Western tradition of buying a Christmas tree.

=== Fireworks ===
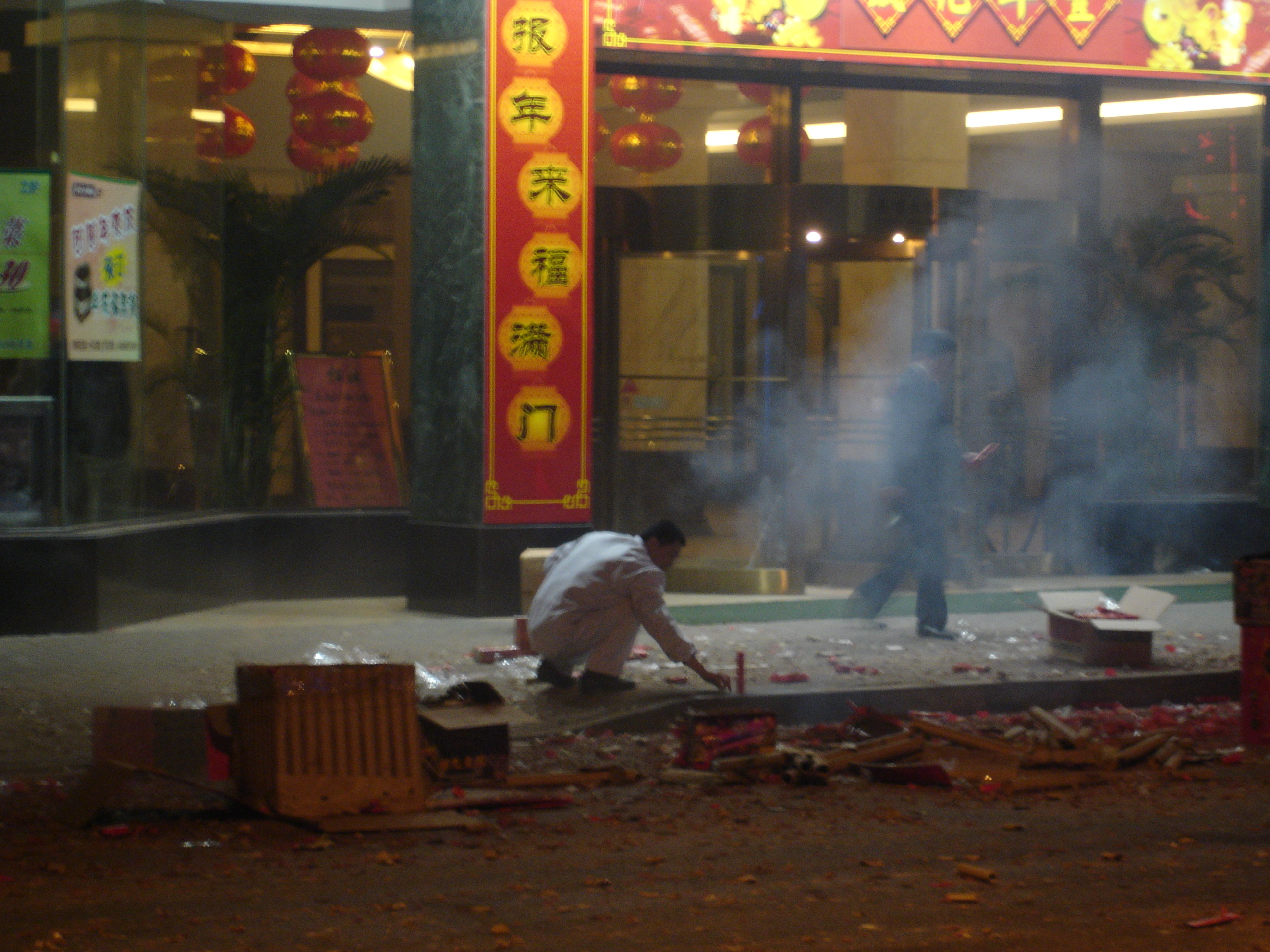
A Chinese man setting off fireworks during Chinese New Year in Shanghai

Bamboo stems filled with gunpowder that were burnt to create small explosions were once used in ancient China to drive away evil spirits. In modern times, this method has evolved into the use of firecrackers during the festive season. Firecrackers are usually strung on a long, fused string so it can be hung. Each firecracker is rolled up in red paper, as red is auspicious, with gunpowder in its core. Once ignited, the firecracker lets out a loud popping noise and, as they are usually strung together by the hundreds, the firecrackers are known for their deafening explosions that are thought to scare away evil spirits. The burning of firecrackers also signifies a joyful time of year and has become an integral aspect of Chinese New Year celebrations. Since the 2000s, firecrackers have been banned in various countries and towns.

=== Shehuo ===
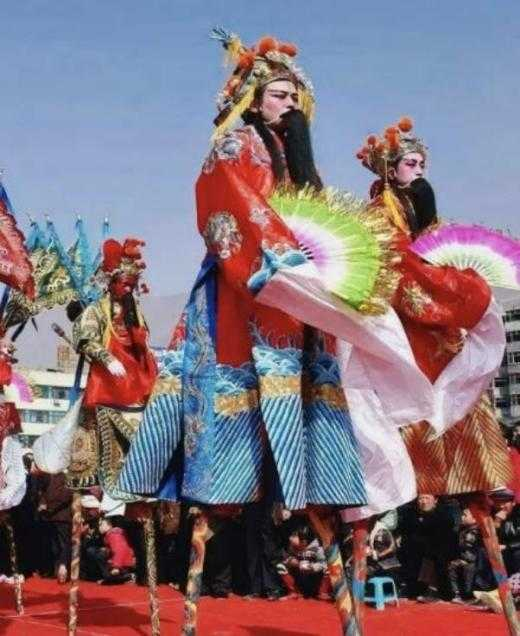
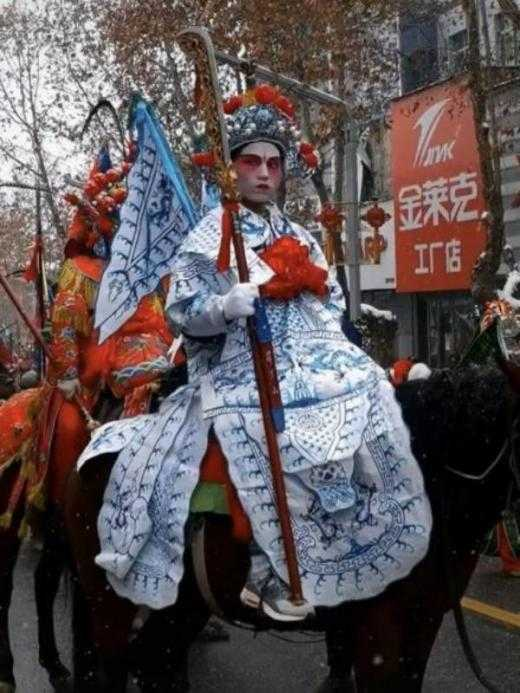
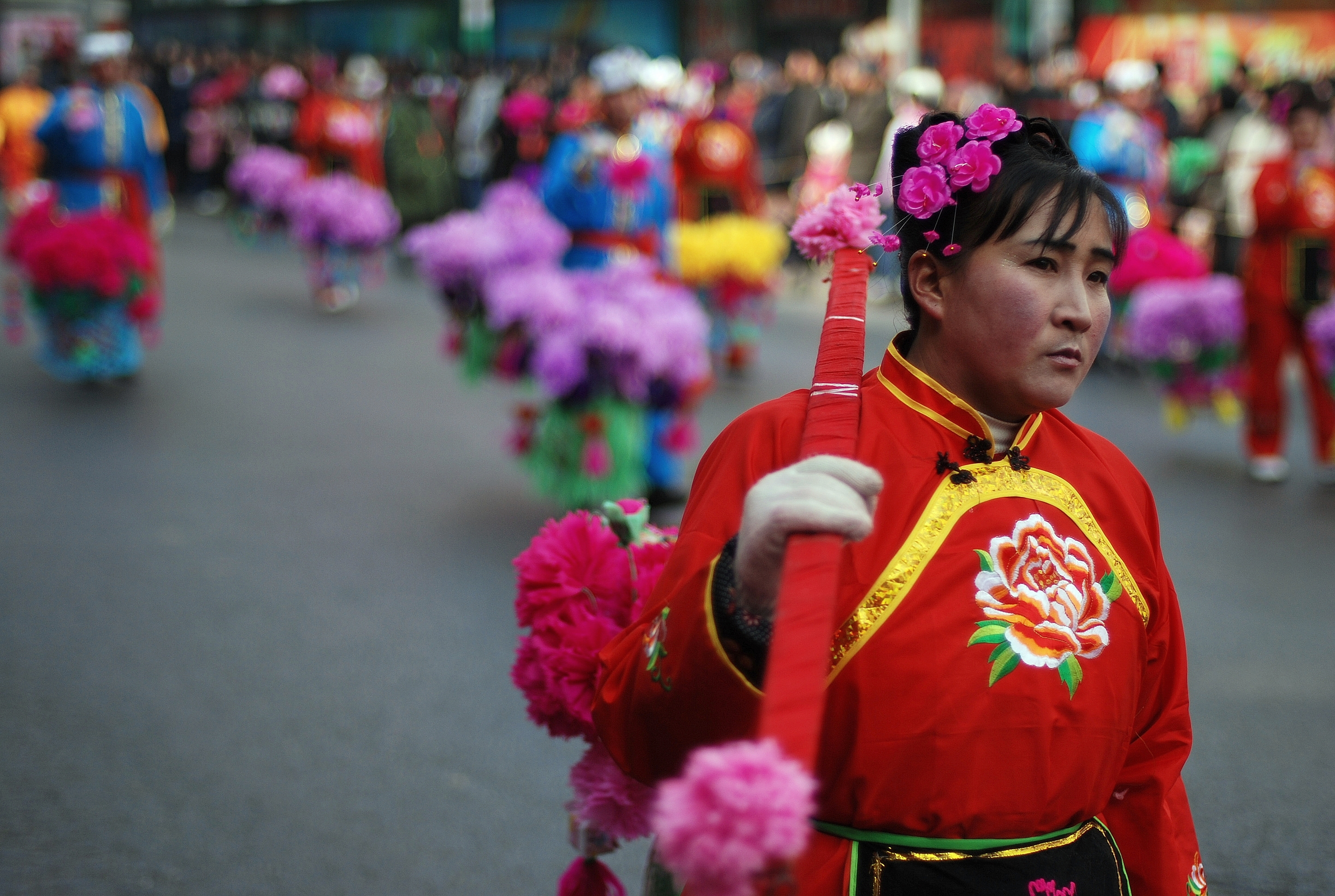
Shehuo parades in Shaanxi and Qinghai

Shehuo is a traditional celebration and carnival activity of Chinese Han folk to celebrate the Spring Festival, featuring various acrobatic performances staged during festivals and sacrificial rites. Rooted in millennia-old agricultural practices of worshipping fire and the land, the folk rituals of Shehuo traditionally entailed praying for good fortune and bounteous harvests, or to drive away demons.

=== Music ===
"Happy New Year!" (Chinese: 新年好呀; pinyin: Xīn Nián Hǎo Ya) is a popular children's song for the New Year holiday. The melody is similar to the American folk song, Oh My Darling, Clementine. Another popular Chinese New Year song is Gong Xi Gong Xi (Chinese: 恭喜恭喜！; pinyin: Gongxi Gongxi!) .

=== Movies ===
Watching Chinese New Year films is an expression of Chinese cultural identity. During the New Year holidays, stage bosses gather the most popular actors from various troupes and let them perform repertories from the Qing dynasty. Nowadays, many people celebrate the New Year by watching these movies. In mainland China, the New Year's Gala is broadcast by every TV station, featuring traditional performances and a message by the CCP General Secretary.

Hong Kong filmmakers also release Chinese New Year films, mostly comedies, at this time of year.

=== Clothing ===
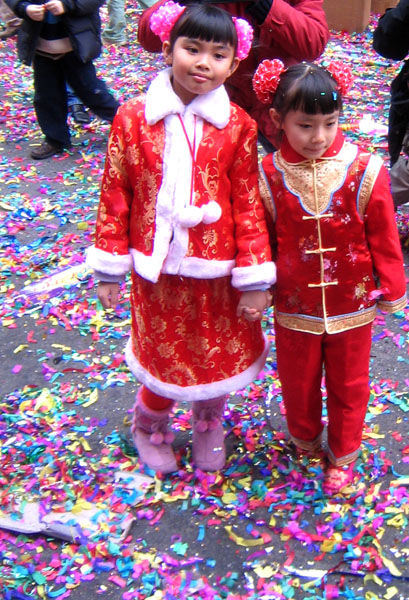
Girls dressed in red (New York)

The colour red is commonly worn throughout Chinese New Year; traditional beliefs held that red could scare away evil spirits. The wearing of new clothes is another clothing custom during the festival; the new clothes symbolize a new beginning.

=== Family portrait ===
In some places, the taking of a family portrait is an important ceremony after the relatives are gathered. The photo is taken in the hall of the house or in front of the house. The eldest male head of the family sits in the center.

=== Symbolism ===
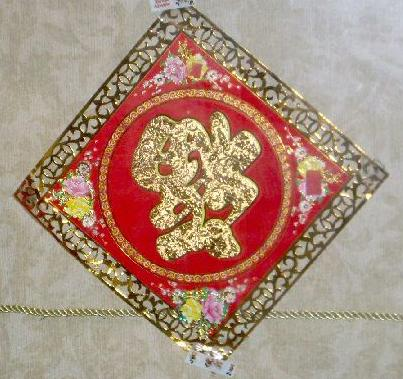
An inverted character fu is a sign of arriving blessings

As with all cultures, Chinese New Year traditions incorporate elements that are symbolic of deeper meanings. One common example of Chinese New Year symbolism are the red diamond-shaped fu characters (Chinese: 福; pinyin: fú; Cantonese Yale: fūk; lit. 'blessings', 'happiness'), which are displayed on the entrances of Chinese homes. This sign is usually seen hanging upside down, since the Chinese word for "upside down" (倒; dào), is homophonous, or nearly homophonous, with the word for "arrive" (到; dào) in all varieties of Chinese. Therefore, it symbolizes the arrival of luck, happiness, and prosperity. Other characters may include (壽; shòu), (萬; wàn), (寶; bǎo), (財; cái), or a combination such as (招財進寶; zhāo cái jìn bǎo).

For Cantonese-speaking people, if the fu sign is hung upside down, the implied dao (upside down) sounds like the Cantonese word for "pour", producing "pour the luck [away]", which would usually symbolize bad luck; this is why the fu character is not usually hung upside-down in Cantonese communities.

Red is the predominant colour used in New Year celebrations. Red symbolizes joy, virtue, truth and sincerity. On the Chinese opera stage, a painted red face usually denotes a sacred or loyal personage and sometimes a great emperor. Candies, cakes, decorations, and many things associated with the New Year and its ceremonies are coloured red. The sound of the Chinese word for "red" (pinyin: hóng; Cantonese Yale: húng) is in Mandarin homophonous with the word for "prosperous". Therefore, red is an auspicious colour and has an auspicious sound.

According to Chinese tradition, the year of the pig is a generally unlucky year for the public, thus encouraging individuals to reevaluate most of their decisions before coming to a conclusion. However, this is said to help you gain more control over your life by learning to stay prepared by being cautious.

=== Nianhua ===
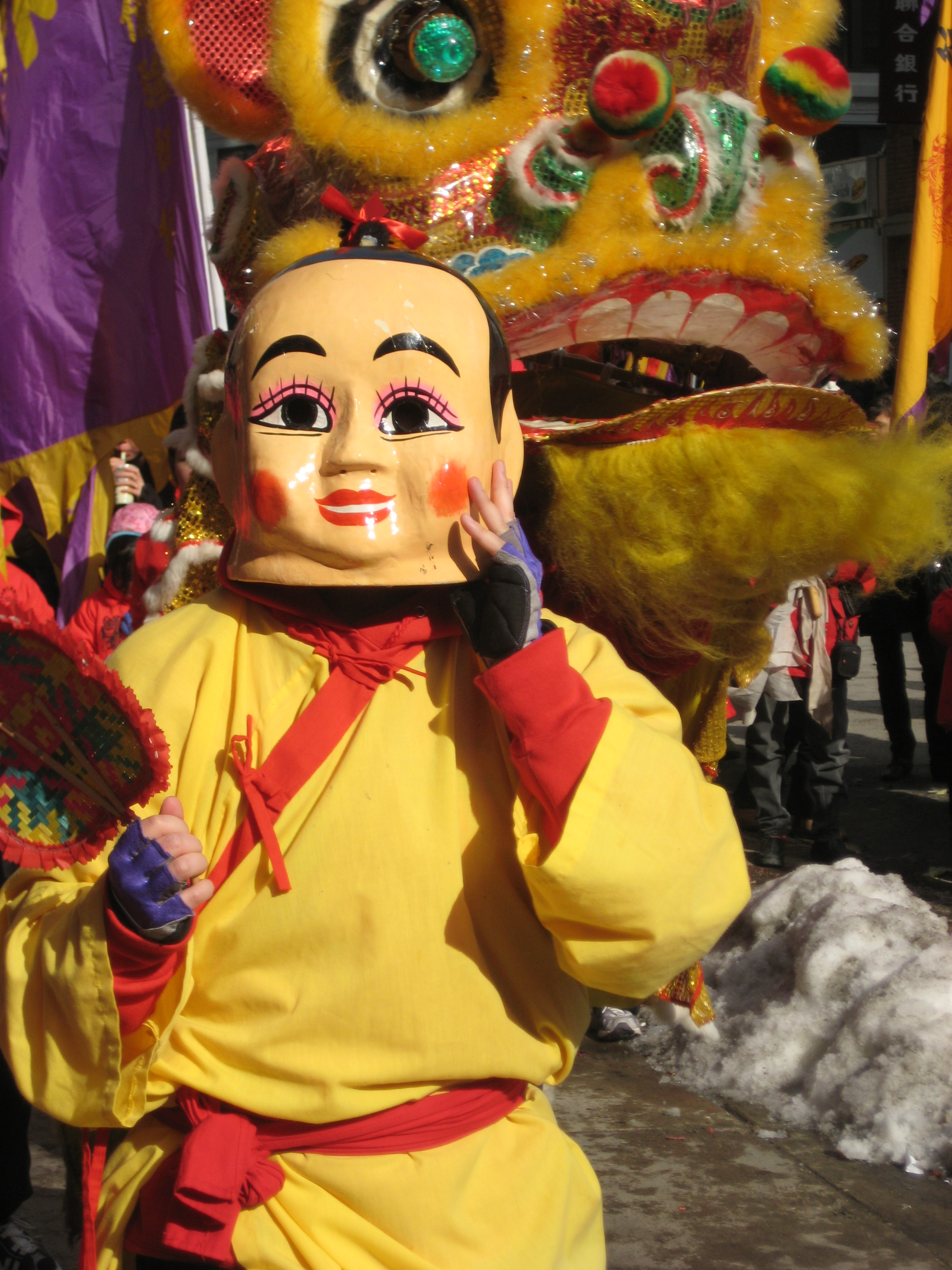
Chinese New Year festival in Chinatown, Boston

Nianhua can be a form of Chinese coloured woodblock printing, for decoration during the Chinese New Year. It employs a range of subjects to express and invite positive prospects as the new year begins. The most popular representatives of these prospects take inspiration from nature, religion, folklore, etc., and are portrayed in flashy and lively ways.

=== Leisure ===
During Chinese New Year day, work at most establishments stops, and a favourite pastime is playing Mahjong with family or friends.

=== Flowers ===
The following are popular floral decorations for the New Year and are available at New Year markets.

Floral Decor	Meaning
Plum Blossom	symbolizes luck
Kumquat	symbolizes prosperity
Calamondin	symbolizes luck
Narcissus	symbolizes prosperity
Bamboo	a plant used for any time of year, its sturdiness represents strength
Sunflower	means to have a good year
Eggplant	a plant to heal all of your sicknesses
Chom Mon Plant	a plant which gives you tranquility
Orchid	represents fertility and abundance, as well as good taste, beauty, luxury and innocence
Phalaenopsis	symbolizes wealth, good luck, prosperity, and the flourishing of family and career

Each flower has a symbolic meaning, and many Chinese people believe that it may usher in the values that it represents. In general, except for those in lucky colours like red and yellow, chrysanthemums should not be displayed at home during the New Year, because they are normally used for ancestral veneration.

=== Icons and ornaments ===
Icons	Meaning	Illustrations
Lanterns	These lanterns differ from those of the Mid-Autumn Festival. They are typically red and oval shaped. These are the traditional Chinese paper lanterns. Those lanterns, used on the fifteenth day of the Chinese New Year for the Lantern Festival, are bright, colorful, and come in many different sizes and shapes.	
Decoration	Decorations generally convey a New Year greeting. They are not advertisements. Faichun, also known as Huichun—Chinese calligraphy of auspicious Chinese idioms on typically red posters—are hung on doorways and walls. Other decorations include a New Year picture, Chinese knots, Sycee, papercutting and couplets.	
Dragon dance and Lion dance	Dragon and lion dances are common during the Chinese New Year. It is believed that the loud beats of the drum and the deafening sounds of the cymbals, together with the face of the Dragon or lion dancing, can evict bad or evil spirits. Lion dances are also popular for the opening of businesses in Hong Kong and Macau.	
Fu Lu Shou	Nianhua of the Fu Lu Shou.	
Red envelope	Typically given to children, the elderly and Dragon/Lion Dance performers while saying t 恭喜發財 j gung1 hei2 faat3 coi4, s 恭喜发财 p gōng xǐ fā cái.	
Shrubs	Citrus trees are typically used for decoration.	

=== Spring travel ===
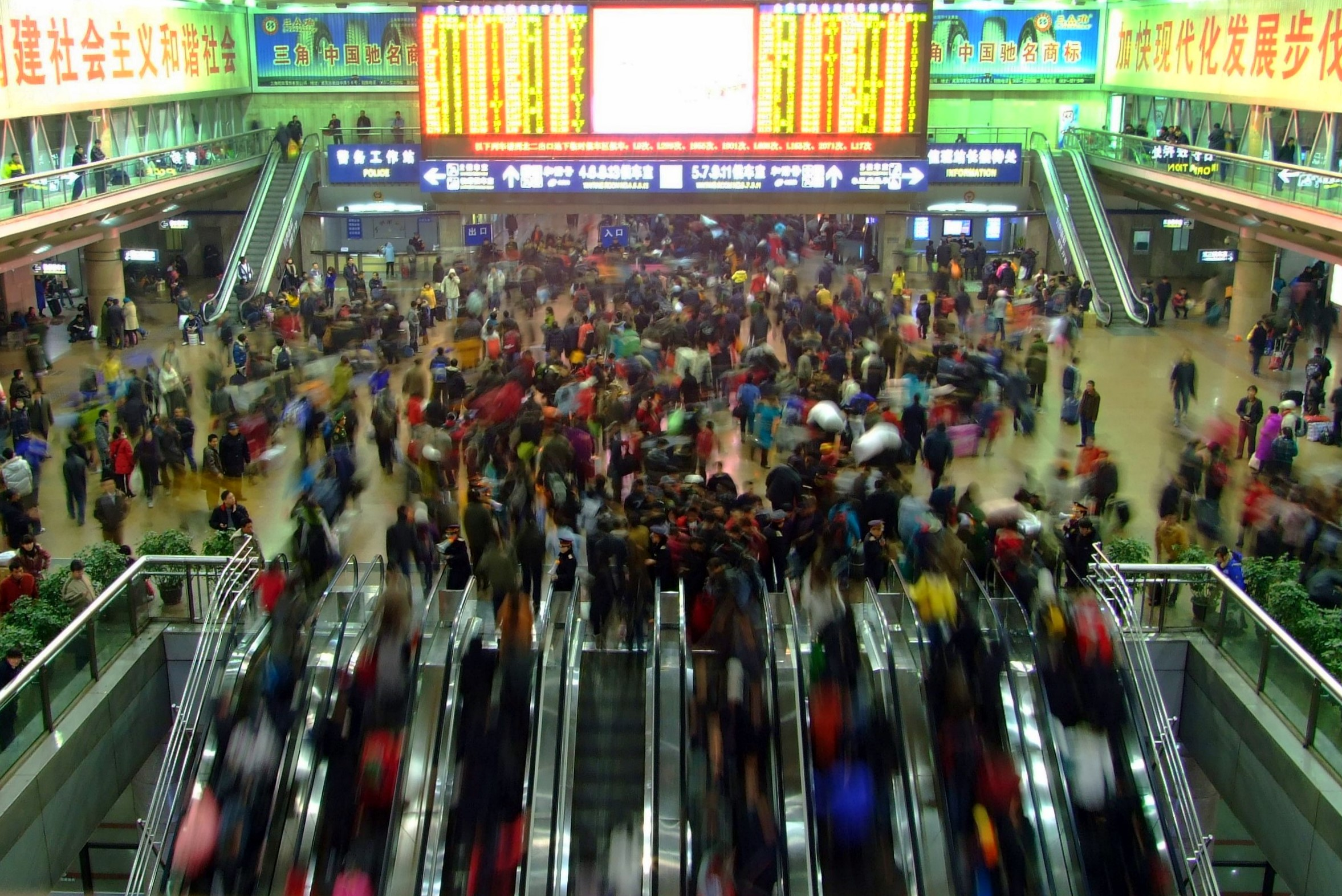
Scene of the 2009 Chunyun period inside Beijing West railway station

Traditionally, families gather together during the Chinese New Year. In modern China, migrant workers travel home to have reunion dinners with their families on Chinese New Year's Eve. Owing to a large number of interprovincial travellers, special arrangements are made by railways, buses, and airlines starting from fifteen days before the New Year's Day. This 40-day period is called chunyun, and is known as the world's largest annual migration. More interurban trips are taken in China in this period than the total population of China.

== Festivities outside China ==
Chinese New Year is also celebrated annually in many countries that house significant Chinese populations. These include countries throughout Asia, Oceania, and North America. Sydney, London, and San Francisco claim to host the largest New Year celebration outside of Asia and South America. The largest Chinese New Year Celebration in the Southern Hemisphere is held in Australia.

=== East Asia ===
==== Korea ====
Seollal (Korean: 설날; RR: Seollal; MR: Sŏllal) is a traditional Korean festival and national holiday commemorating the first day of the lunisolar calendar. It is one of the most important traditional holidays for ethnic Koreans, being celebrated in both North Korea and South Korea as well as by the Korean diaspora all around the world. During this time, many Koreans would visit their family, perform ancestral rites, wear the hanbok (한복; 韓服) / Chosŏn-ot (조선옷; 朝鮮옷), eat traditional food, and play traditional folk games. One of the most well-known practices of the current day is receiving money from their elders after performing a formal bow, a tradition likely adopted from Confucian customs.

==== Japan ====
The Japanese New Year (正月, Shōgatsu) is an annual festival that takes place in Japan. Since 1873, the official Japanese New Year has been celebrated according to the Gregorian calendar, on 1 January of each year, New Year's Day (元日, Ganjitsu). Before 1872, traditional events of the Japanese New Year were celebrated on the first day of the year of the modern Tenpō calendar, the last official lunisolar calendar. Before the Meiji period, the date of the Japanese New Year had been based on Japanese versions of lunisolar calendar (the last of which was the Tenpō calendar) and, before, Jōkyō calendar, the Chinese version. However, in 1873, five years after the Meiji Restoration, Japan adopted the Gregorian calendar, and the first day of January became the official and cultural New Year's Day in Japan.

==== Taiwan ====
In Taiwan, the most common terms for the Chinese New Year are Chinese: 農曆新年; pinyin: Nónglì Xīnnián; lit. 'Agricultural Calendar New Year' and Chinese: 過年; pinyin: Guònián; lit. 'passing year'. Unlike in China, where Chinese: 春节; pinyin: Chūn Jié; lit. 'Spring Festival' is the standard and official term; people in Taiwan typically do not use "Spring Festival" in daily conversations. Instead, they emphasize the connection to the traditional Chinese calendar by calling it 農曆新年 ("lunar new year"), or simply refer to it as 過年 ("past year"), which is more casual and widely used among families and friends—these terms are also acceptable in mainland Chinese usage.

Taiwanese Guonian differs from the Chinese Spring Festival in several cultural practices, traditions, and customs, despite both celebrations being based on the traditional Chinese calendar. In Taiwan, the Chinese New Year (農曆新年) emphasises honouring ancestors through elaborate rituals, including offering food and incense at home altars. Taiwanese families often prioritise local delicacies, such as pineapple cakes and kuih s, symbolizing prosperity and good fortune. While large firework displays are popular in some places, Taiwan tends to focus more on temple visits, lantern-lighting ceremonies, and family reunions.

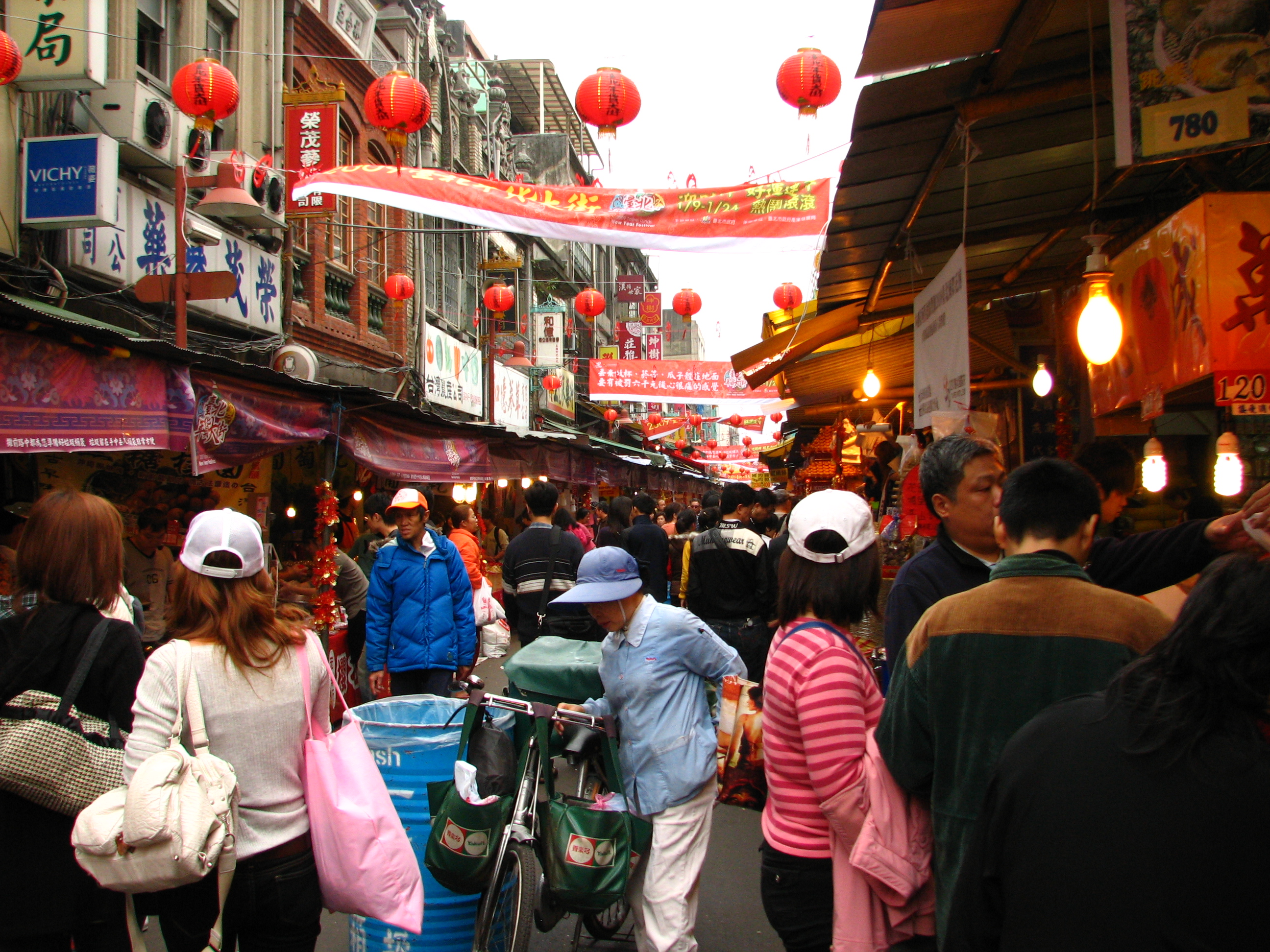
Dihua Street market in Taipei during the Chinese New Year

In Taiwan, businesses traditionally reopen on the sixth day of the Chinese New Year, accompanied by firecrackers. In the morning of the ninth day (traditionally anytime between midnight and 7 am), Taiwanese households set up an altar table with three layers: one top (containing offertories of six vegetables (Chinese: 六齋; pinyin: liù zhāi; those being noodles, fruits, cakes, tangyuan, vegetable bowls, and unripe betel), all decorated with paper lanterns), and two lower levels (five sacrifices and wines) to honour the deities below the Jade Emperor. The household then kneels three times and kowtows nine times to pay obeisance and wish him a long life. Incense, tea, fruits, vegetarian food or roasted pig, and gold paper are served as customary protocol for paying respect to an honored person. In Taiwan in the 2000s, some employers also gave red packets as a bonus to maids, nurses, or domestic workers from Southeast Asian countries, although whether this is appropriate is controversial.

In Taiwan, spring travel is a significant event known as the Spring Festival travel rush. The primary mode of transportation in western Taiwan is oriented in a north–south direction, facilitating long-distance travel between the urbanized north and rural hometowns in the south. However, transportation in eastern Taiwan and between Taiwan and its outlying islands is less convenient. Cross-strait flights between Taiwan and China commenced in 2003 as part of the Three Links initiative, primarily catering to "Taiwanese businessmen" returning to Taiwan for the new year.

=== Southeast Asia ===
Chinese New Year is a national public holiday in many Southeast Asian countries and is considered to be one of the most important holidays of the year.

==== Malaysia ====
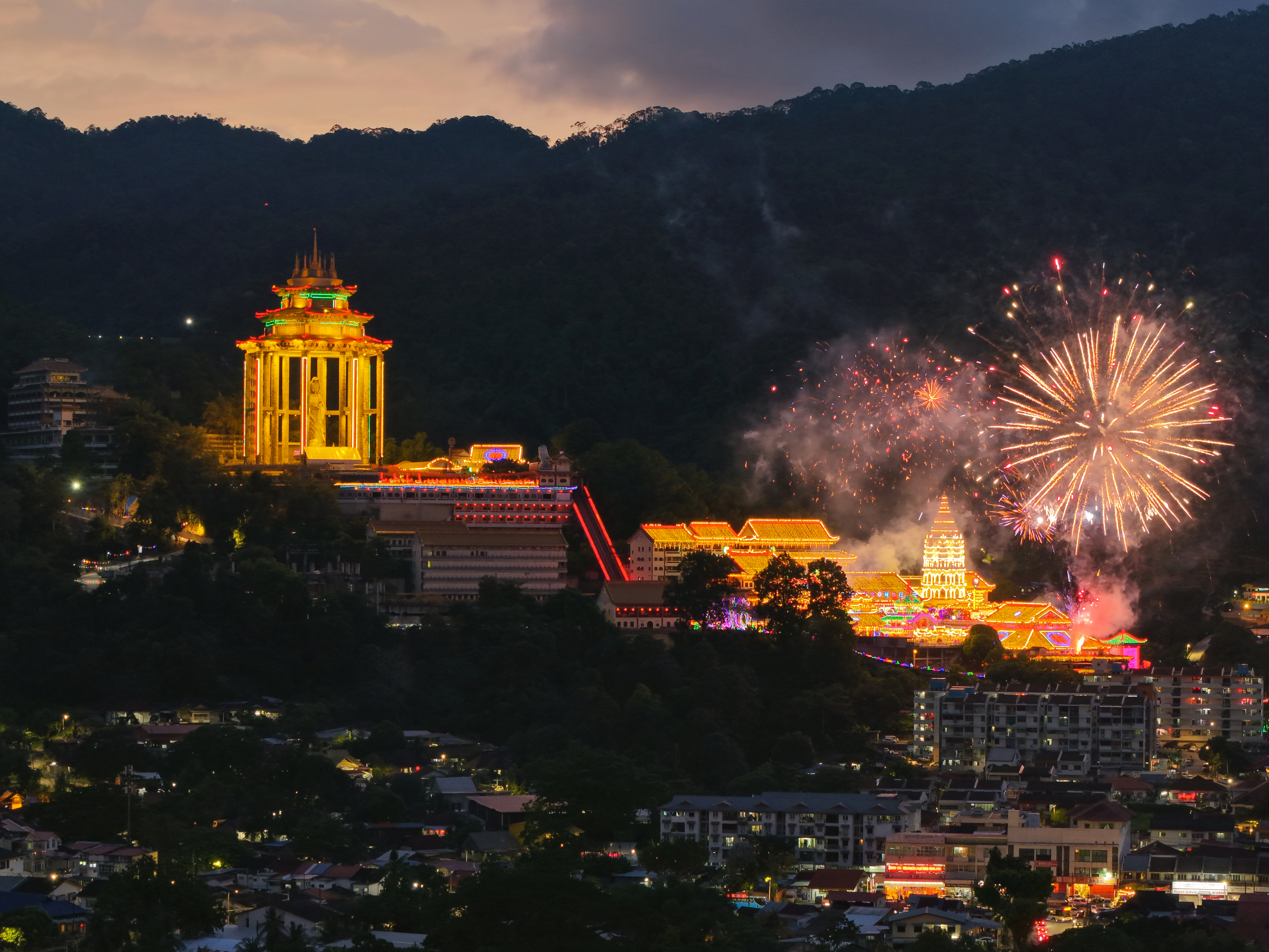
Malaysia's largest Buddhist temple – Kek Lok Si in George Town – illuminated in preparation for Chinese New Year in 2025.

Chinese New Year's Eve is typically a half-day holiday in Malaysia, while Chinese New Year is a two-day public holiday. George Town, a Chinese-majority city, is known for its lively Chinese New Year celebrations that last until the Lantern Festival on the fifteenth day. Kek Lok Si, the largest Buddhist temple in Malaysia, is typically lit up throughout the festivities. Penang's Chief Minister customarily hosts an "open house" for the public, while various other events take place across the city, including at the Chinese clan houses and the Snake Temple. Hokkien households celebrate the Jade Emperor's birthday, known colloquially as the "Hokkien New Year", on the ninth day, with offerings. Traditionally, during the Lantern Festival, single females throw oranges at seafront locations such as the Esplanade in the hope of finding their partners.

==== Singapore ====
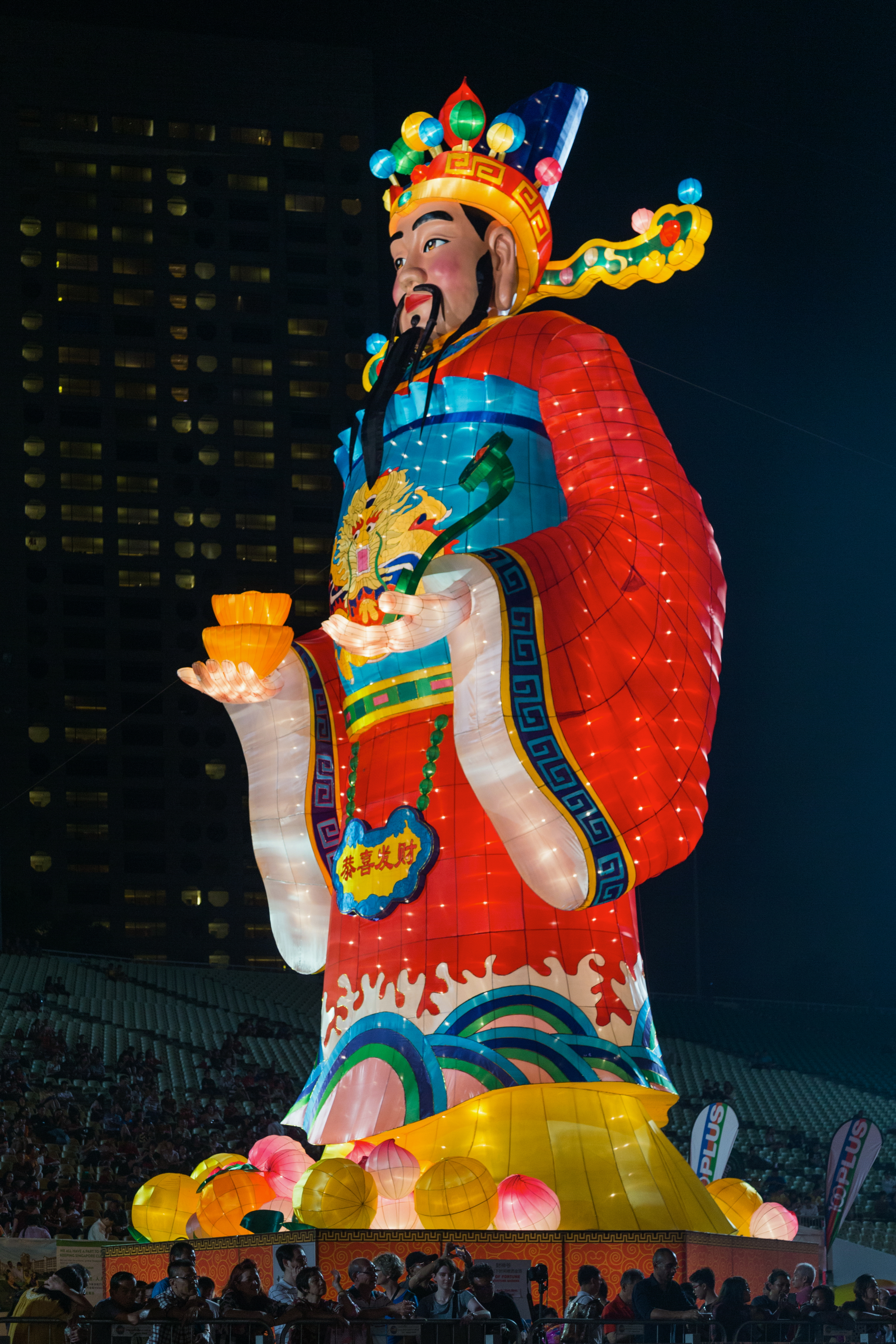
Decorations on the occasion of Chinese New Year – River Hongbao 2016, Singapore

In Singapore, Chinese New Year is officially a two-day public holiday and is accompanied by various festive activities. One of the main highlights is the Chinatown celebrations. In 2010, this included a Festive Street Bazaar, nightly staged shows at Kreta Ayer Square, and a lion dance competition. The Chingay Parade also features prominently in the celebrations. It is an annual street parade in Singapore, well known for its colourful floats and a wide variety of cultural performances. The highlights of the Parade for 2011 included a Fire Party, multi-ethnic performances, and a travelling dance competition.

==== Indonesia ====
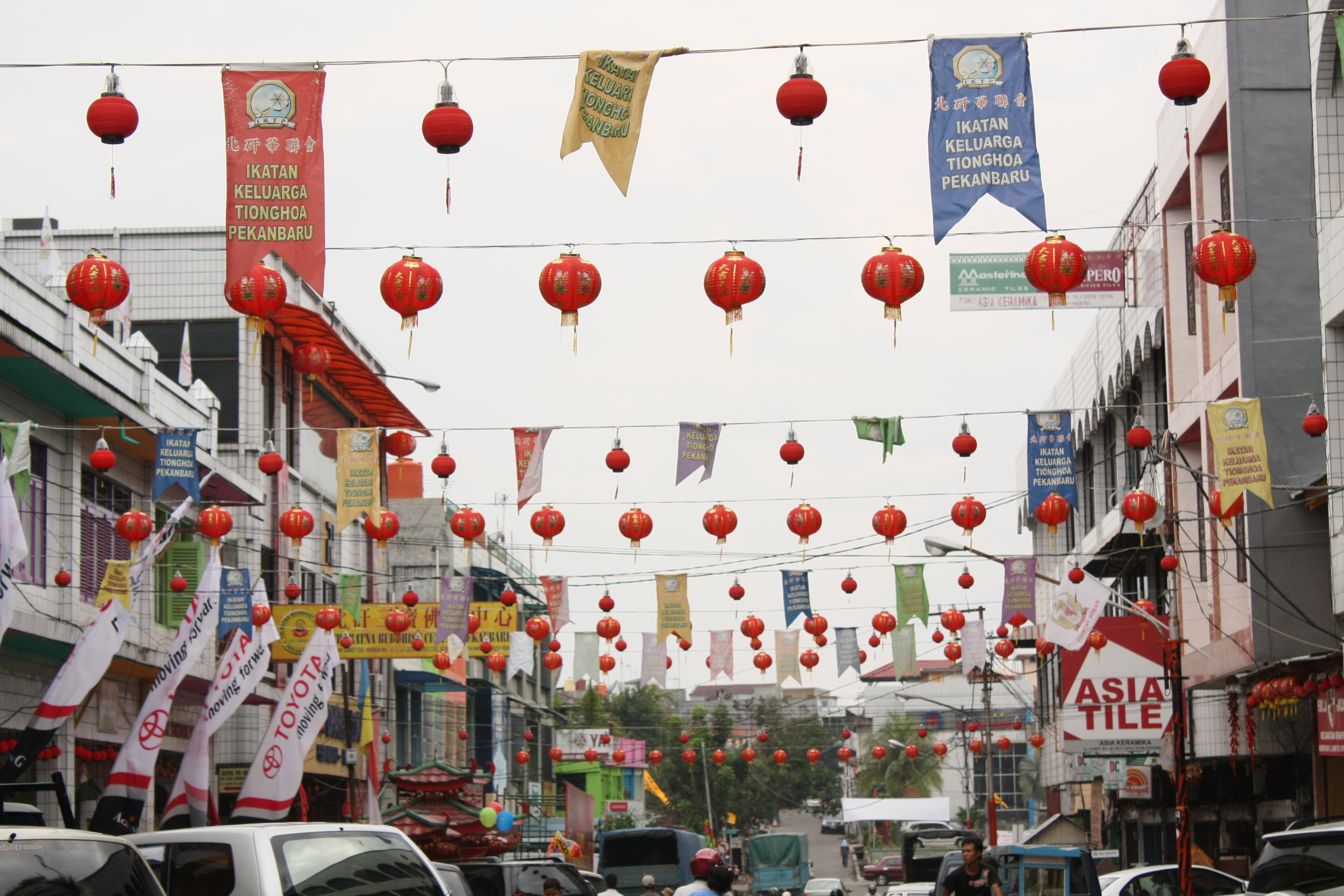
Lanterns hung around Senapelan street, the Pekanbaru Chinatown in Riau, Indonesia

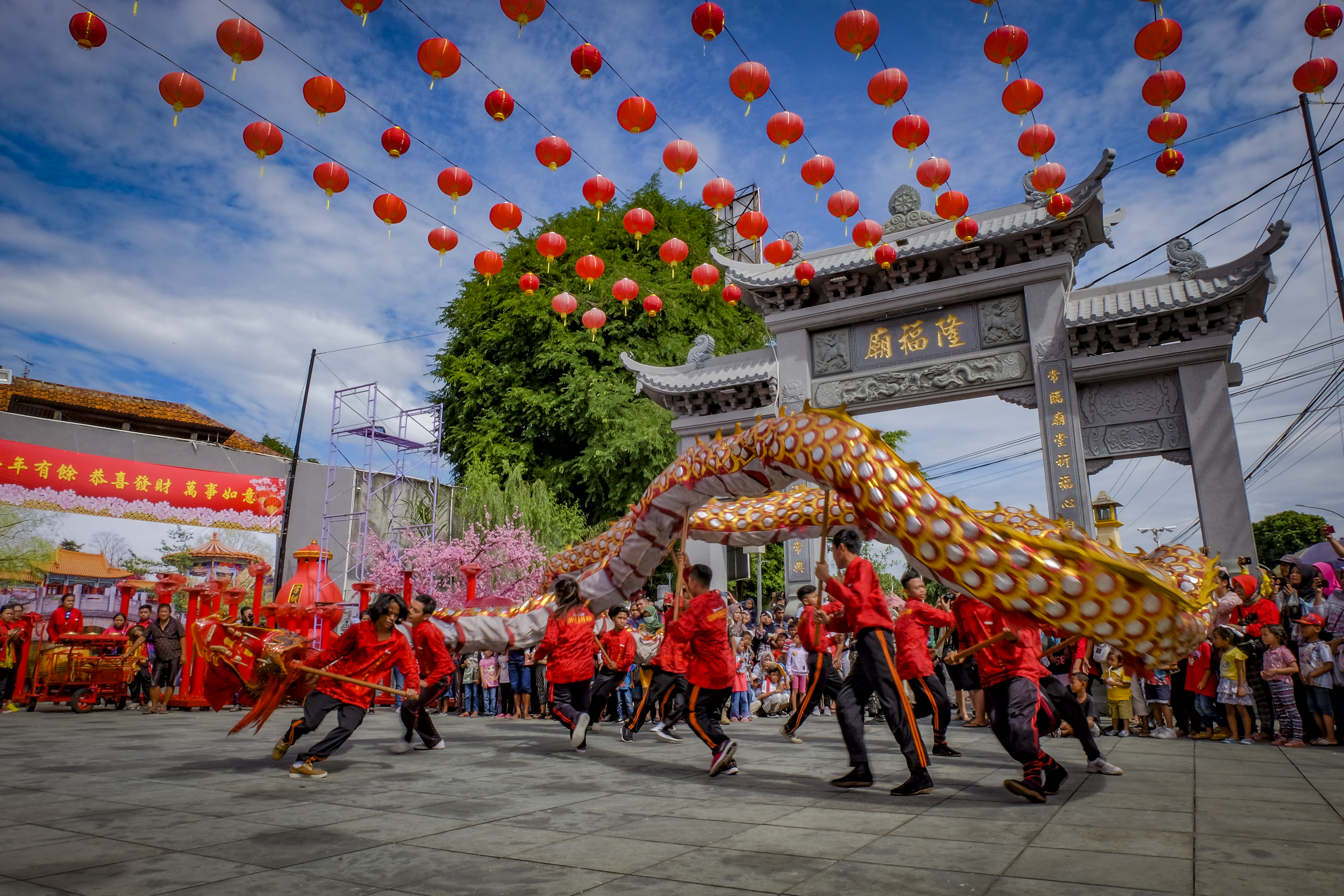
Liong attraction during Chinese New Year in Jakarta, Indonesia

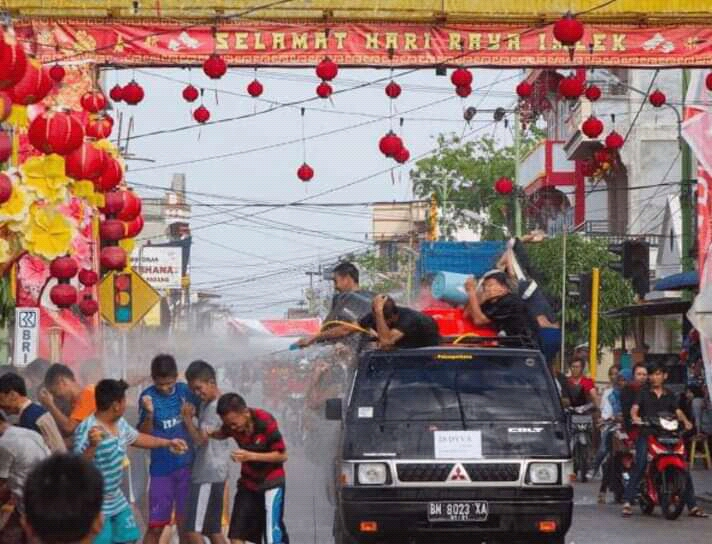
Cian cui (Chinese: 濺水; Pe̍h-ōe-jī: chiān-chúi) is an Indonesian tradition during Chinese New Year, which involves splashing others with water. Photograph taken in Selatpanjang, Riau, Indonesia.

In Indonesia, the first day of the Chinese New Year is recognized as a national holiday. The remaining 14 days are usually only celebrated by ethnic Chinese families. Chinese Year follows the Confucius year or Kǒngzǐlì (Chinese: 孔子历) or Kongzili in Indonesian. Chinese New Year is officially named Tahun Baru Imlek (Chinese: 陰曆新年; Pe̍h-ōe-jī: im-le̍k sin-nî), with Imlek deriving from the Hokkien word for "Lunar Calendar" (Chinese: 陰曆; Pe̍h-ōe-jī: im-le̍k). It is known locally in Hokkien as Sin Cia (Chinese: 新正; Pe̍h-ōe-jī: sin-chiaⁿ). It was celebrated as one of the official national religious holidays by Chinese Indonesians from 18 June 1946 to 1 January 1953 through a government regulation signed by President Sukarno on 18 June 1946. It was unofficially celebrated by ethnic Chinese from 1953 to 1967 based on a government regulation signed by vice-president Mohammad Hatta on 5 February 1953, which annulled the previous regulation, among others.

Effectively from 6 December 1967, until 1998, the spiritual practice of celebrating Chinese New Year by Chinese families was specifically restricted to only inside the Chinese house. This restriction was made by the New Order government through Presidential Instruction No. 14 of 1967 signed by President Suharto. This restriction was ended when the regime changed and President Suharto was overthrown. The celebration was conducted unofficially by the Chinese community from 1999 to 2000. On 17 January 2000, President Abdurrahman Wahid issued Presidential Decree No. 6 of 2000 to annul the previous instruction. On 19 January 2001, the Ministry of Religious Affairs issued Ministerial Decree No.13 of 2001 on Imlek Day as a National Holiday to set Hari Tahun Baru Imlek as a "facultative holiday" for the Chinese community. Through a presidential decree it was officially declared as a one-day public holiday as of 9 April 2002 by President Megawati.

Cities with significant Chinese populations in Indonesia such as Jakarta, Medan, Batam, Surabaya, Semarang, Surakarta, Singkawang, Pangkal Pinang, Binjai, Bagansiapiapi, Tanjungbalai, Pematangsiantar, Selat Panjang, Pekanbaru, Tanjung Pinang, Ketapang, Pontianak, Sungailiat, Tanjung Pandan, Manggar, Toboali, Muntok, Lubuk Pakam, Bandung, Rantau Prapat, Tebing Tinggi, Sibolga, Dumai, Panipahan, Tanjung Balai Karimun, Jambi, Palembang, Bengkayang, Manado, and Tangerang always celebrate the new year with parades and fireworks. Shopping malls typically decorate their interiors and exteriors with lanterns and various Chinese ornaments. Lion dances are very common throughout the city, usually in residential areas, temples, and shopping centres. Usually, Buddhists, Confucians, and Taoists will burn incense made out of aloeswood in front of their houses as prayers. Chinese temples are generally open for 24 hours on the first day, distributing red envelopes and sometimes rice, fruits or sugar to the poor.

==== Philippines ====
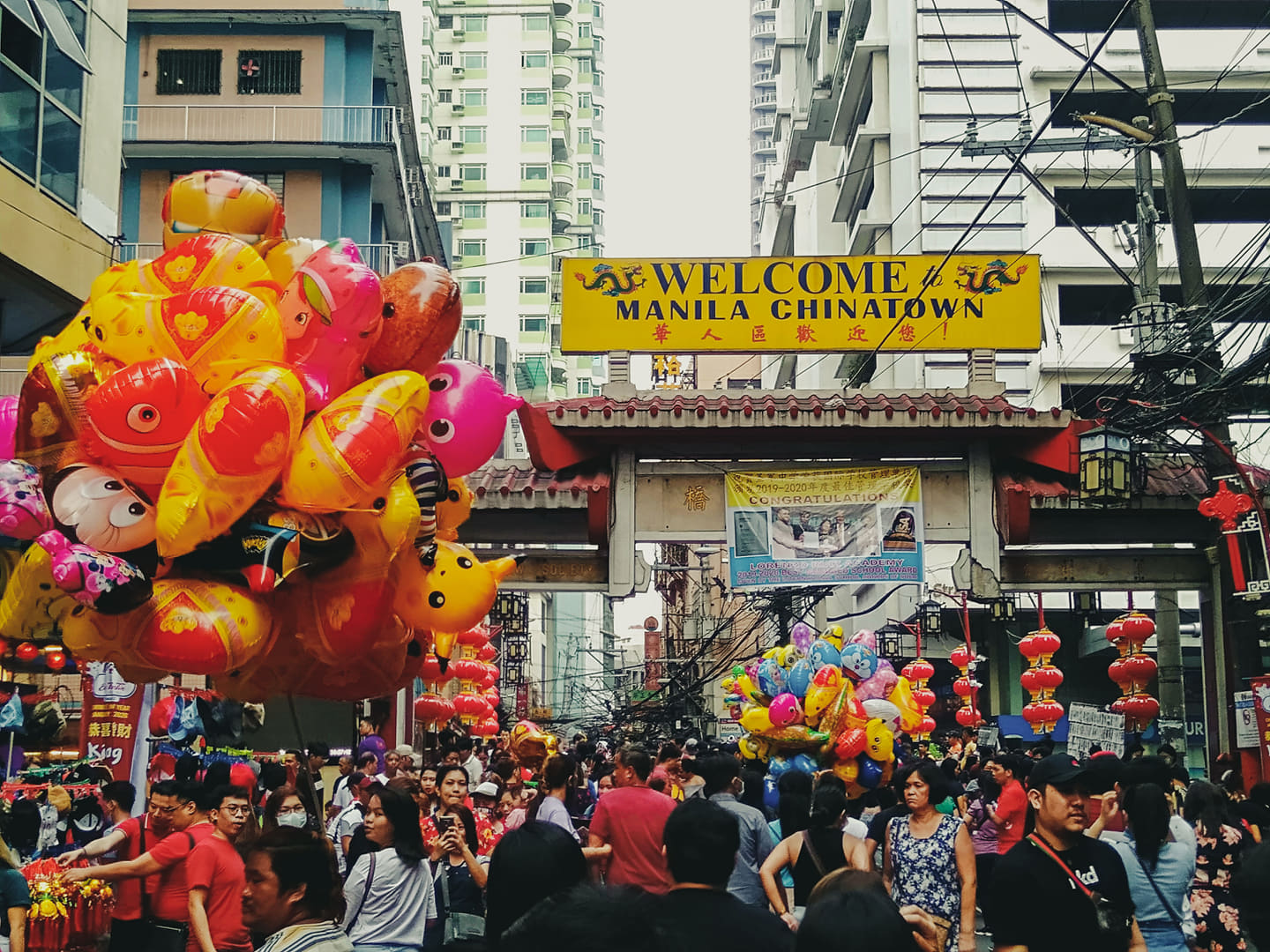
A busy street in Manila Chinatown, celebrating the 2020 Chinese New Year

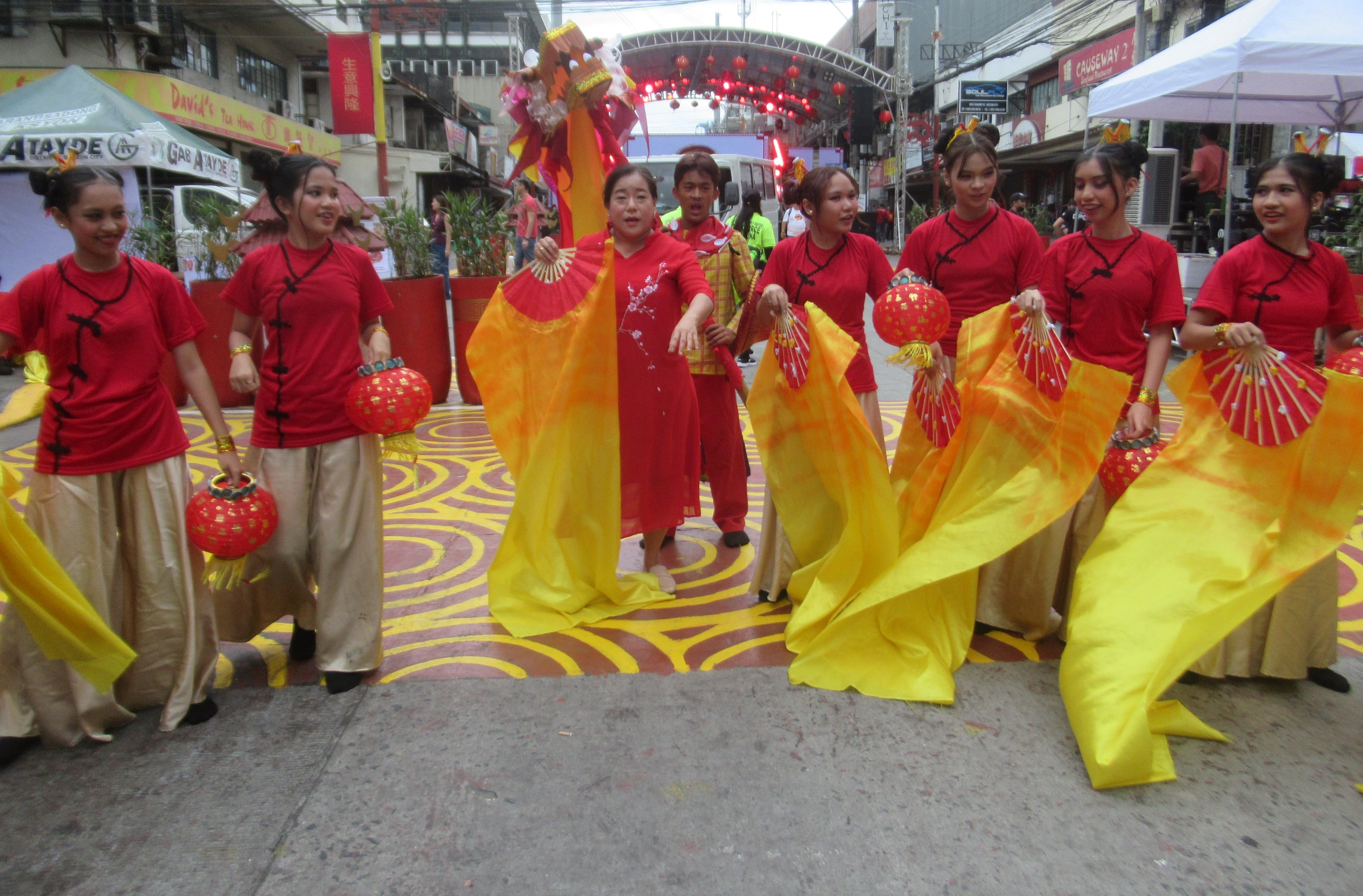
Folk dancers celebrating the 2025 Chinese New Year at Banawe Chinatown in Quezon City

In the Philippines, Chinese New Year (Philippine Hokkien Chinese: 咱人年兜; Pe̍h-ōe-jī: Lán-nâng Nî-tau) is considered one of the important festivals for Chinese Filipinos, and its celebration has also extended to the majority non-Chinese Filipinos, especially since, in 2012, Chinese New Year was included as a public non-working holiday in the Philippines. During this time of year, the selling or giving of tikoy, especially by Chinese Filipinos, is widely known and practised. Celebrations are centered primarily in Binondo in Manila, the oldest Chinatown in the world, with other celebrations taking place in key cities.

In 2024, Manila celebrated the Spring Festival of the Wooden Dragon, as well as the 430th anniversary of Manila Chinatown, featuring the "Manila Chinatown Solidarity Float Parade"—along Manila Central Post Office in Lawton, Ermita, and Jones Bridge—led by Chinese ambassador Huang Xilian with the winners of Mr. & Ms. Chinatown Philippines 2023. It was preceded by Chinese New Year's Eve, with the "First incense offering" at Binondo Church, a Taoist prayer ritual with Joss sticks, including Chinese ancestor worship at Martyr Saints of China altars in Binondo Chinese Parish Church. At midnight, a 2-minute pyro-musical fireworks display was witnessed by 1.5 million at the Chinese-Filipino Friendship Bridge. In Cebu, a festival called the Red Lantern Festival was held.

==== Thailand ====
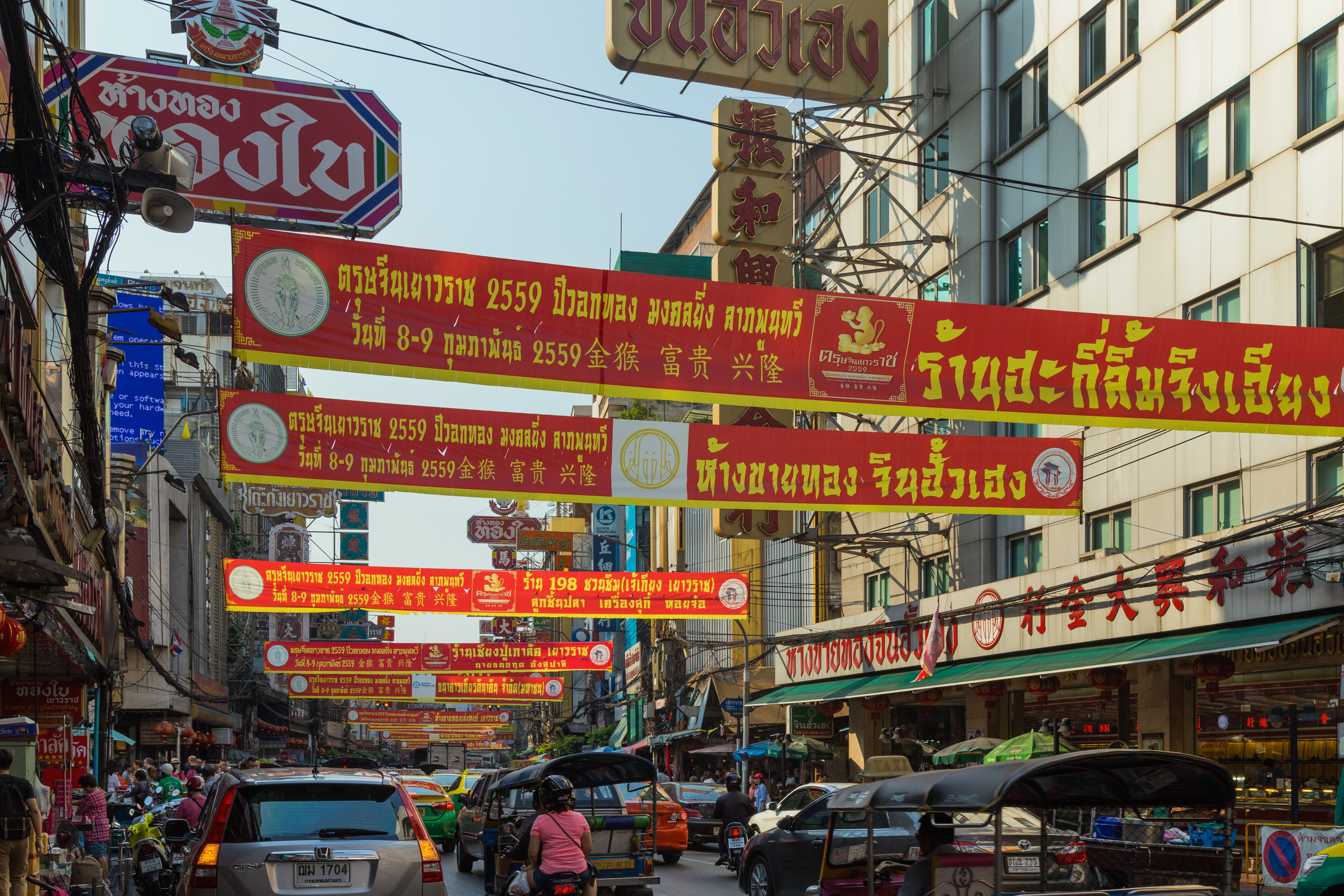
Greeting banners of various companies in the Chinese New Year 2016, Yaowarat

Chinese New Year festivities occur throughout Thailand, especially in provinces where many people of Chinese descent live, such as Nakhon Sawan, Suphan Buri, and Phuket. Chinese New Year is observed as a public holiday in the provinces of Narathiwat, Pattani, Yala, Satun, and Songkhla. In Bangkok, there are large celebrations in Chinatown, Yaowarat Road, where the main road is closed and turned into a pedestrian street, with a member of the royal family in attendance each year to open the ceremony, such as Princess Maha Chakri Sirindhorn. For 2021 (for one year only), the government declared the Chinese New Year a government holiday. It applied mostly to civil servants. Financial institutions and private businesses were allowed to decide whether or not to observe it. In 2026, no official Chinese New Year celebrations were held in Yaowarat as the country was in mourning following the passing of the Queen Sirikit. Nevertheless, decorative lights and lanterns were displayed as usual, and Songkhla Province declared the day a public holiday.

Observed by Thai Chinese and parts of the private sector, the festivities occur over three days, starting on the day before Chinese New Year's Eve. The first day is Wan chai (Thai: วันจ่าย; pay day), the day that people go out to shop for offerings. The second day is Wan wai (Thai: วันไหว้; worship day), which is a day of worshiping the gods and ancestral spirits, which is further divided into three periods—dawn, late morning, and afternoon. The third day is Wan tieow (Thai: วันเที่ยว; holiday), which is a holiday where everyone will leave the house to travel or to bless relatives or respectable people, often wearing red clothes, which are believed to be auspicious.

=== India and Pakistan ===
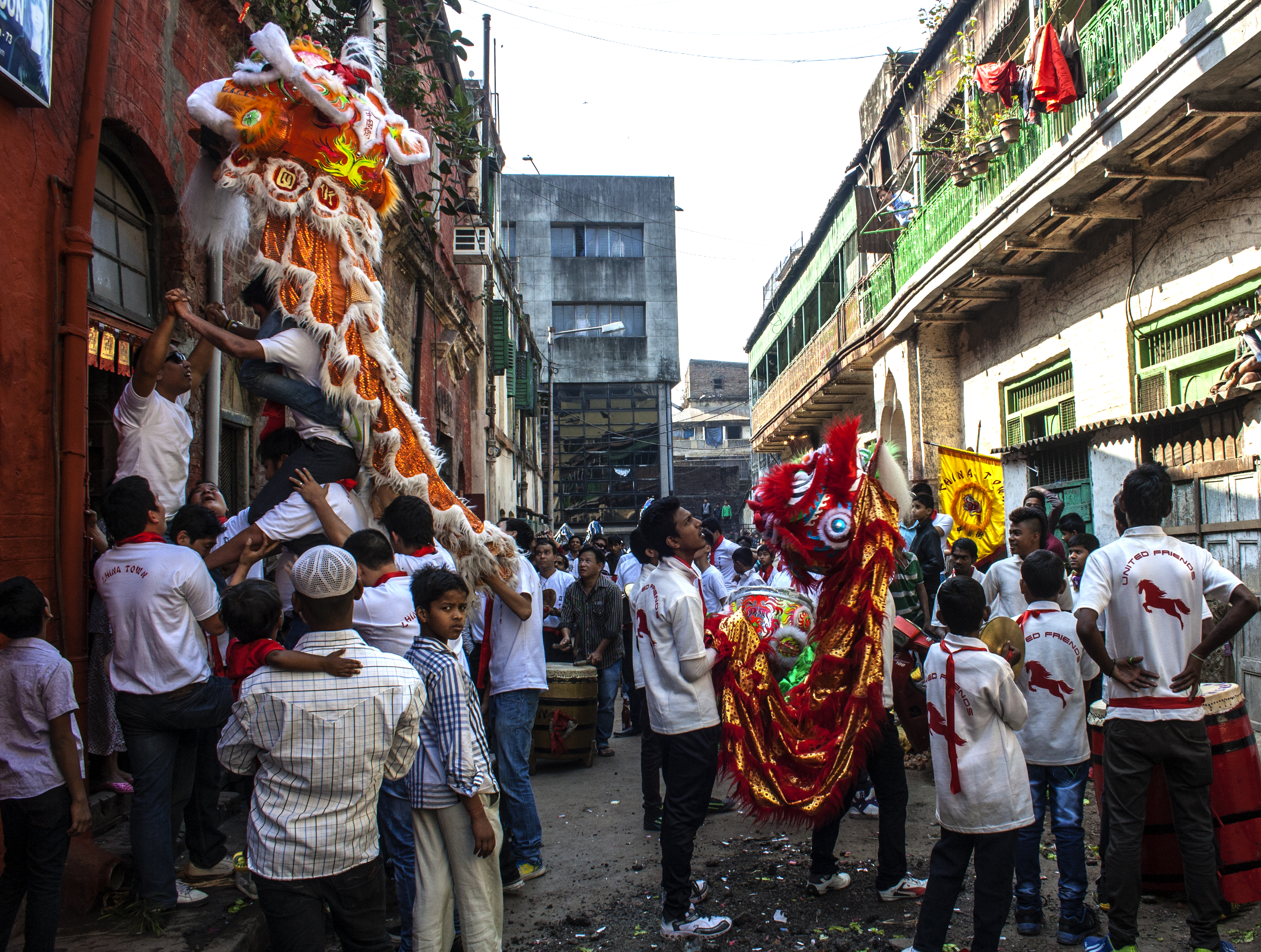
Chinese New Year 2014 Celebration in Kolkata

In India, many celebrate Chinese New Year with lion and dragon dances in Chinatown, Kolkata, where a significant community of people of Chinese origin exists.

In Pakistan, Chinese New Year is celebrated among the sizeable Chinese expatriate community that lives in the country. During the festival, the Chinese embassy in Islamabad arranges various cultural events in which Pakistani arts and cultural organizations and members of the civil society also participate.

=== Mauritius ===
Chinese culture in Mauritius is an important component of the multiculturalism in Mauritius. Despite the small size of the Sino-Mauritian community (estimated to be only about 3% of the total population), Chinese New Year (also known as Chinese Spring Festival) is a time when Chinese culture is celebrated on the island. Mauritius is also the only country in Africa that lists the Chinese Spring Festival as a statutory public holiday. During this period of the year, there is a joyful and festive atmosphere throughout the entire country.

Sino-Mauritians are very attached to Chinese traditions. The Chinese Spring Festival is the biggest celebration for the Sino-Mauritians on the island. The dates of the celebration follow the Chinese lunisolar calendar instead of the Gregorian calendar. During the week before New Year's Day, spring cleaning in homes is performed. The festival starts on Chinese New Year's Eve by lighting firecrackers to ward off evil spirits. Traditionalists visit pagodas for offerings and prayers on New Year's Eve. Following Chinese customs, there is a big family dinner on New Year's Eve. While the family dinner was traditionally celebrated at the house of the oldest family members, going to restaurants for New Year's Eve is getting more popular; some restaurants may have special dinners to foster the family reunions of Sino-Mauritians. After the New Year Eve's dinner, youths often go to nightclubs.

On Chinese New Year day, it is customary for Sino-Mauritians to share niangao with their relatives and friends and to light firecrackers to ward off evil spirits. Red envelopes are also given. Some families would also visit pagodas on New Year's Day to honour their ancestors. There are families who observe a vegetarian diet on New Year's Day. The main events typically take place in the Chinatown area in Port Louis, the capital of Mauritius. The Dragon dance and the Southern Lion dance are customarily performed on that day. The colour red is predominantly used to decorate the streets and houses. Chinese items (e.g. Chinese lanterns) are also used as decorations.

=== Oceania ===
==== Australia and New Zealand ====
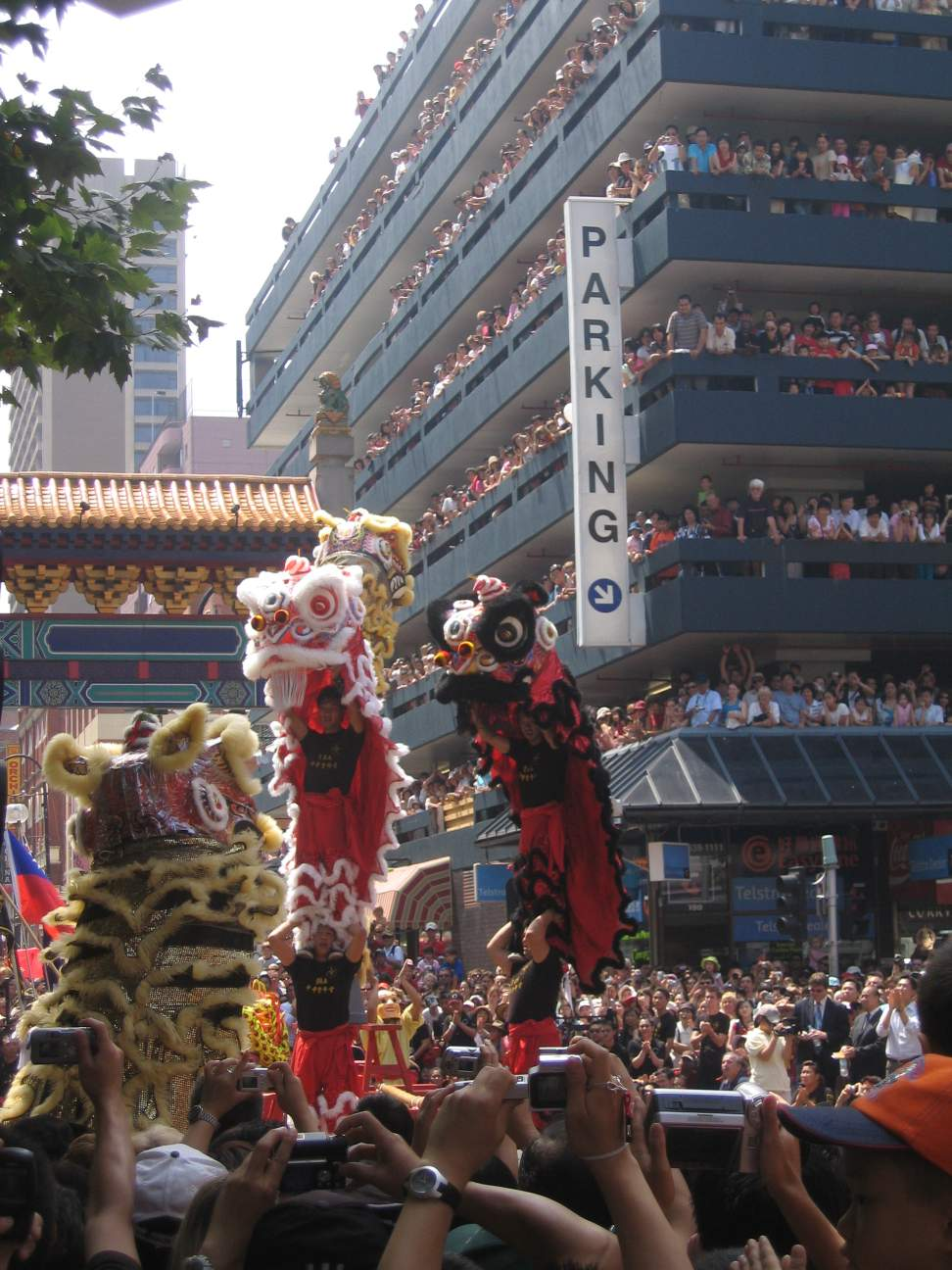
Chinese New Year in Chinatown, Melbourne

With one of the largest Chinese populations outside of Asia, Sydney also boasts the largest Chinese New Year celebrations outside of Asia, annually attracting over 600,000 attendees to the festivities in Chinatown. The events span over three weeks and include a launch celebration, outdoor markets, evening street food stalls, Chinese opera performances, dragon boat races, a film festival, and multiple parades featuring participants from Chinese, Korean, and Vietnamese communities. The main parade, which sees over 100,000 spectators and involves more than 3,500 performers, is a notable highlight of the celebrations. The festival also attracts international media coverage, reaching millions of viewers in Asia. The festival in Sydney is organized in partnership with a different Chinese province each year. In addition to Sydney, other state capital cities in Australia also celebrate the Chinese New Year due to the large number of Chinese residents in those cities. The cities include: Brisbane, Adelaide, Melbourne, Box Hill, and Perth. The common activities are the lion dance, dragon dance, New Year market, and food festival. In the Melbourne suburb of Footscray, Victoria, a Lunar New Year celebration, initially focusing on the Vietnamese New Year, has expanded into a celebration of the Chinese New Year as well as the April New Year celebrations of the Thais, Cambodians, Laotians, and other Asian Australian communities, which celebrate the New Year in either January/February or April.

In New Zealand, Auckland hosts the Auckland Lantern Festival for 4 days. Meanwhile, Wellington hosts a two-day weekend festival for Chinese New Year, and a one-day festival is held in Dunedin, centred on the city's Chinese gardens.

=== North America ===
Chinese New Year in Washington, D.C.

Many cities in North America sponsor official parades for Chinese New Year. Among the cities with such parades are New York City (Manhattan, Flushing, Queens, and Brooklyn), San Francisco, Los Angeles, Boston, Chicago, Mexico City, Toronto, and Vancouver. However, even smaller cities that are historically connected with Chinese immigration, such as Butte, Montana, have recently hosted parades.

==== New York City ====
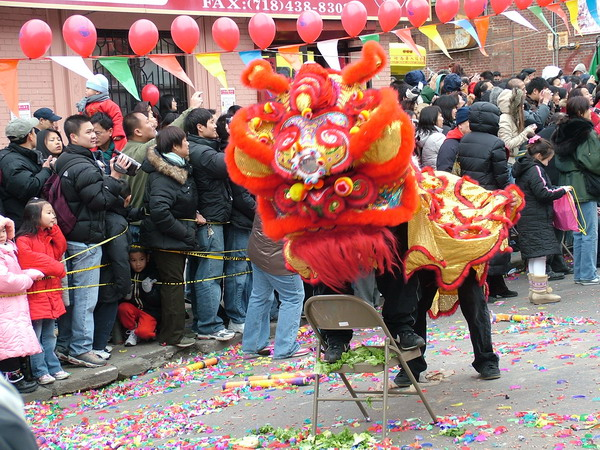
Lion dance in Fuzhou Town, Brooklyn

Multiple groups in New York City cooperate to sponsor a week-long Chinese New Year celebration. The festivities include a cultural festival and special exhibits. One of the key celebrations is the Chinese New Year parade with floats and fireworks taking place along the streets in Chinatown, Manhattan, the largest Chinese New Year parade outside Asia. In June 2015, New York City Mayor Bill de Blasio declared that the Lunar New Year would be made a public school holiday, and in September 2023, New York State made Lunar New Year a mandatory public school holiday.

==== California ====
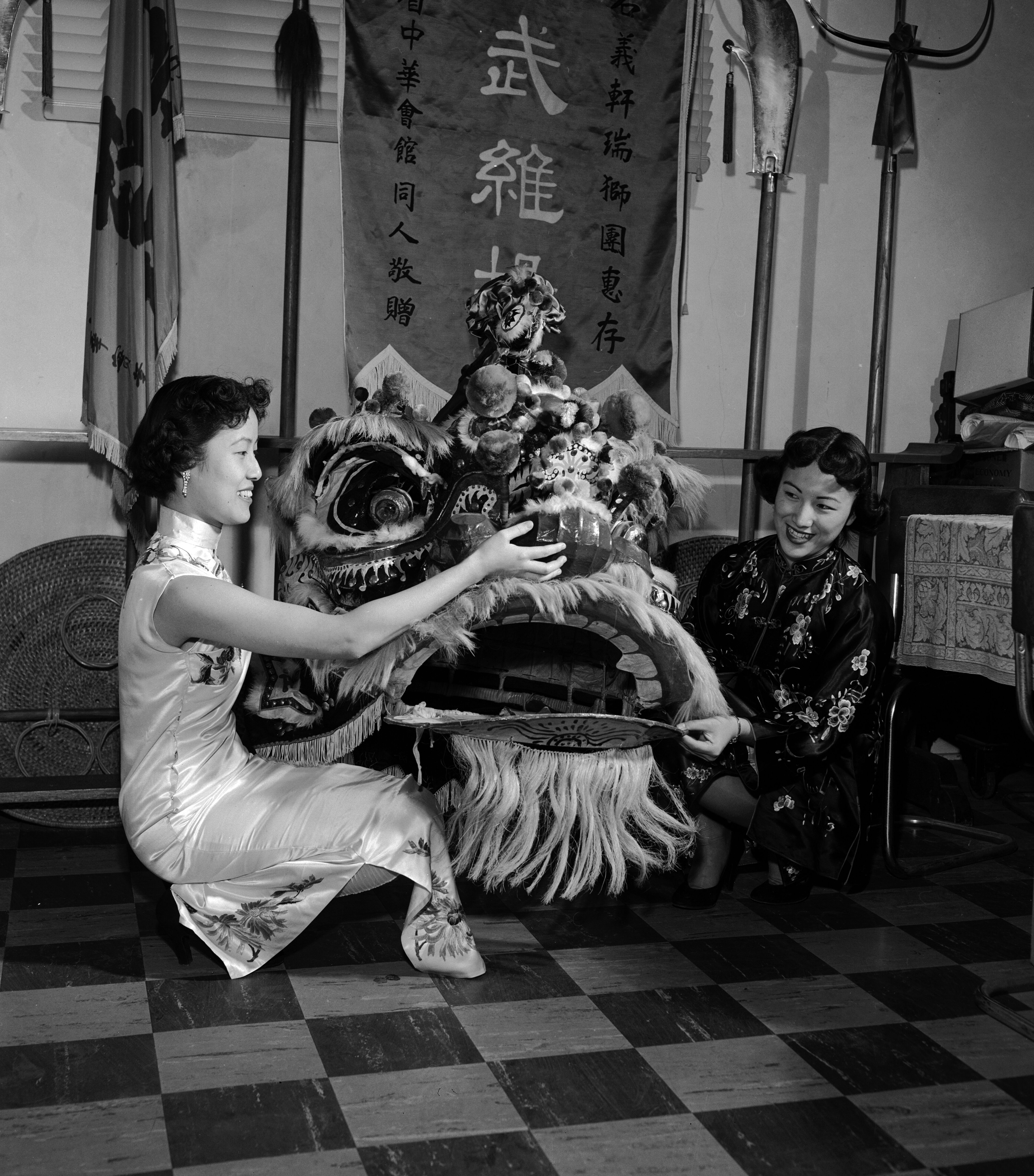
Lion costume for New Year parade, Los Angeles, 1953

Signed into law in 2022 and effective in 2023, California declared the Lunar New Year a state government holiday. Many communities throughout all of California celebrate with large celebrations taking place in both the San Francisco Bay Area and Greater Los Angeles, as well as in Fresno, Sacramento, San Diego, Santa Rosa, and Stockton.

==== San Francisco ====
The San Francisco Chinese New Year Festival and Parade is the oldest and one of the largest events of its kind outside of Asia, and one of the largest Asian cultural events in North America.

The festival incorporates Grant and Kearny Streets into its street festival and parade route, respectively. The use of these streets traces its lineage back to early parades, beginning the custom in San Francisco. In 1849, with the discovery of gold and the ensuing California Gold Rush, over 50,000 people came to San Francisco to seek their fortune or just a better way of life. Among those were many Chinese, who had come to work in the gold mines and on the railroad. By the 1860s, the residents of San Francisco's Chinatown were eager to share their culture with their fellow San Francisco residents who may have been unfamiliar with (or hostile towards) it. The organizers chose to showcase their culture by using a favourite American tradition – the parade. They invited a variety of other groups from the city to participate, and they marched down what today are Grant Avenue and Kearny Street, carrying colourful flags, banners, lanterns, drums, and firecrackers to drive away evil spirits.

In San Francisco, over 100 units participate in the annual Chinese New Year Parade, which has been held since 1958. The parade is attended by some 500,000 people, along with another 3 million TV viewers.

==== Greater Los Angeles ====
The Golden Dragon Parade has happened annually in Chinatown, Los Angeles, since 1899, one of the oldest and largest Chinese New Year parades outside of Asia. Beginning in the 1970s, famous Asian American actors have held the title of Grand Marshall of the parade, the first being the late Bruce Lee.

Around Southern California, many communities also put on festivals and parades that can last multiple days, with some of the largest occurring in the San Gabriel Valley, home to the largest Chinese community outside of Asia and often called the first suburban Chinatown, and Little Saigon, where many Vietnamese and Chinese live. The Little Saigon area has hosted Tet celebrations since 1982 for its Chinese and Vietnamese communities. They were originally held at Garden Grove Park, with parades in both Garden Grove and Westminster. Monterey Park puts on the largest of such festivals, occupying 5 blocks in the city and attracting over 100,000 individuals.

Neighboring Alhambra has also hosted a large festival since 1993 with many performances and street vendors. San Gabriel hosts an annual Chinese Gala at the San Gabriel Mission Playhouse in addition to its street festival. Starting in 2014, there are also larger celebrations at the Orange County Fair and Events Center in Costa Mesa, which attract over 50,000 visitors. Neighboring Fountain Valley also hosts an annual Chinese New Year carnival in Mile Square Regional Park with many food vendors and a Ferris wheel.

Many people also celebrate by going to temples across Southern California, and the largest temple celebration is held at Hsi Lai Temple in Hacienda Heights. Most major shopping malls will also be decorated for the Chinese New Year. Disneyland California Adventure in Anaheim celebrates the Chinese New Year by decorating certain areas of the park in Chinese displays, serving speciality East Asian foods and allowing for character photos with Mulan, Mushu, Raya, Tigger, and Mickey and Minnie Mouse in Chinese Costumes. Some other communities that hold Chinese New Year Celebrations include Eastvale, Hollywood, Irvine, Palos Verdes, Pasadena, Rancho Cucamonga, Riverside, Rosemead, San Marino, San Pedro, Santa Monica, Temple City, Tustin, and West Covina.

=== Europe ===
==== United Kingdom ====
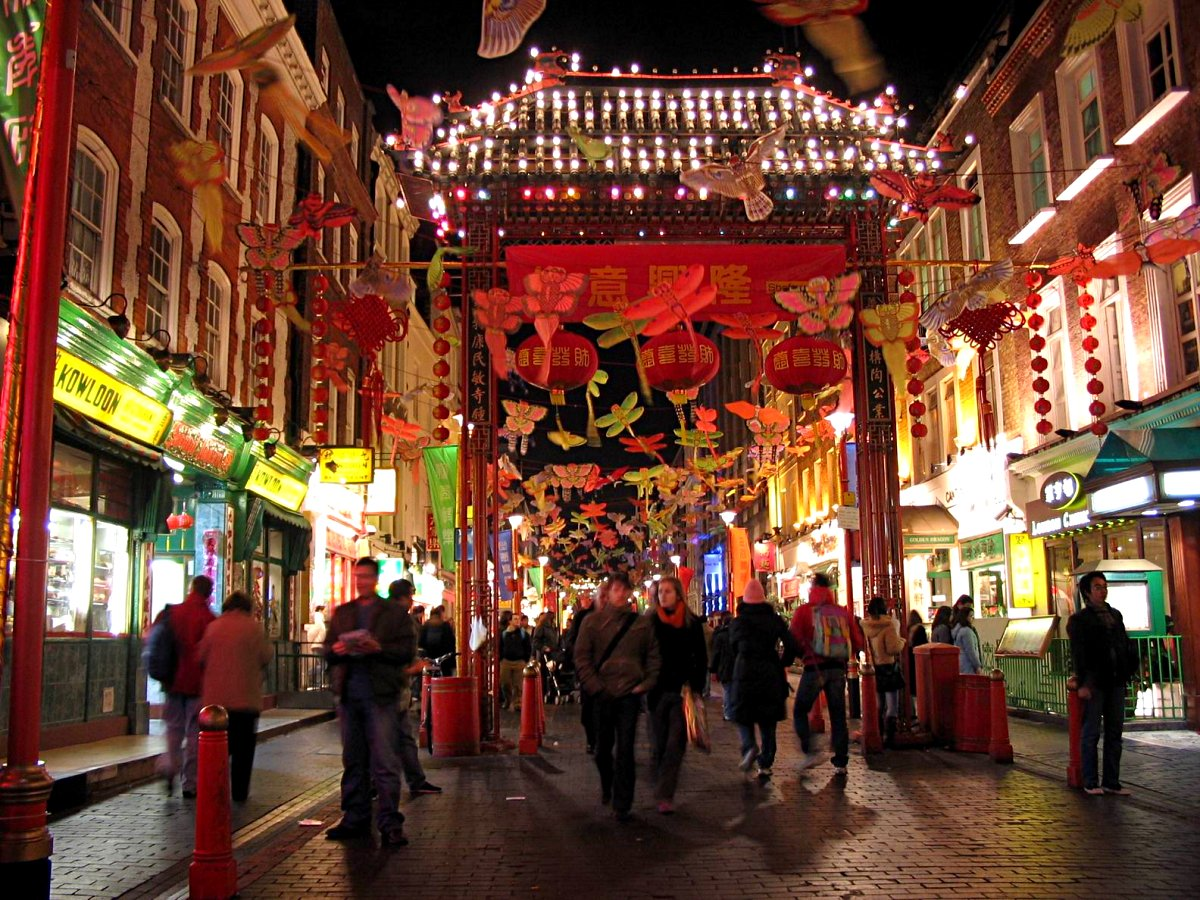
London: Chinatown with Chinese New Year decoration

In London, celebrations take place in Chinatown, Leicester Square, and Trafalgar Square. Festivities include a parade, culturally oriented feast, fireworks, concerts, and performances. The celebration attracts between 300,000 and 500,000 people yearly, according to the organisers.

==== France ====
In Paris, since the 1980s, month-long celebrations have been held in several districts with many performances. The largest of three parades has around 40 groups and 4,000 performers and is attended by more than 200,000 people in the 13th arrondissement.

==== Netherlands ====
Official celebrations are held in The Hague, Amsterdam, and Rotterdam.

==== Hungary ====
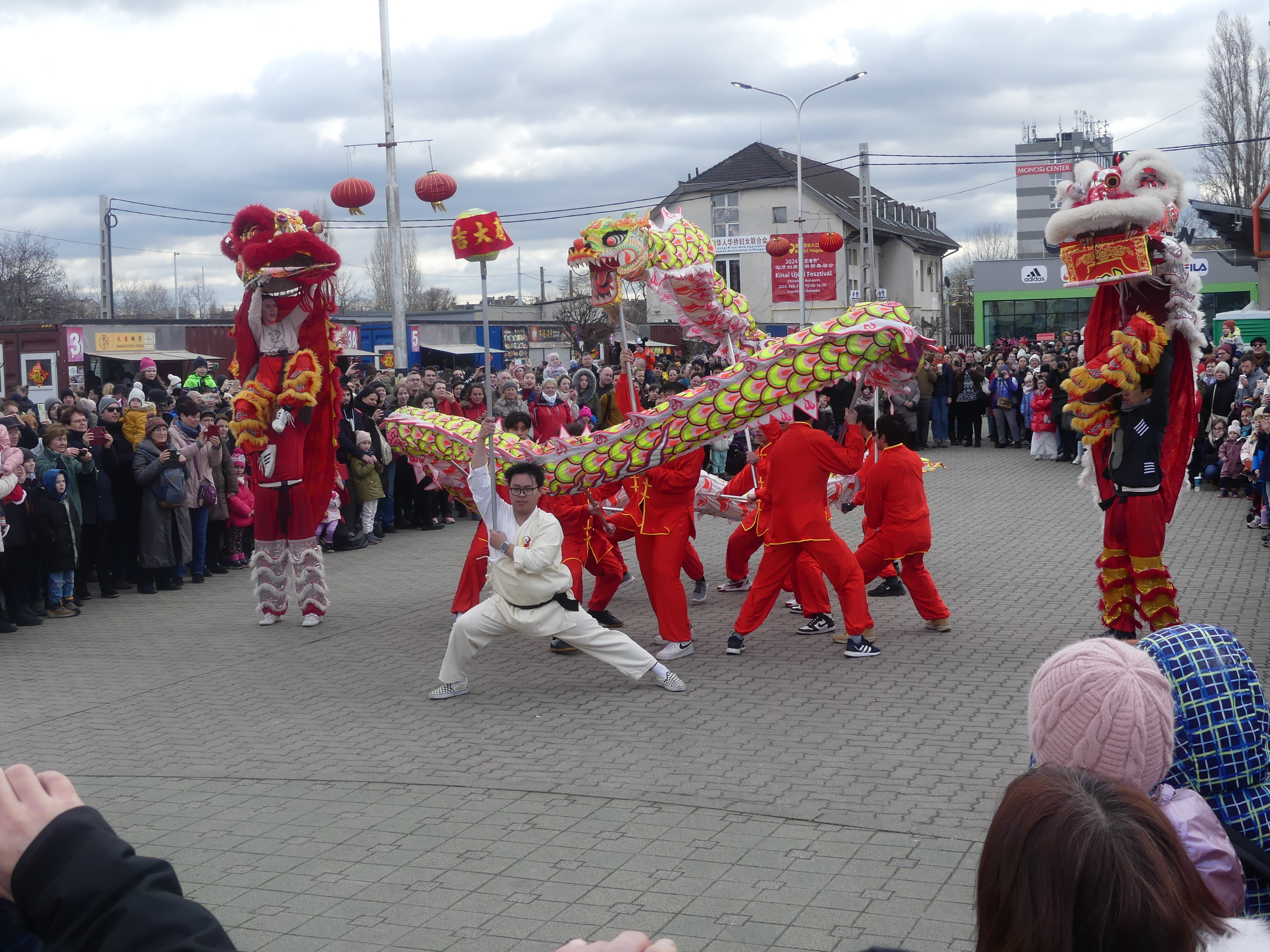
Chinese New Year at Kőbánya, 2024

In Budapest, celebrations have been held since 2017 in the Kőbánya district with many parades and performances.

== Greetings ==
Chinese New Year is often accompanied by loud, enthusiastic greetings, often referred to as 吉祥話 (jíxiánghuà) in Mandarin or 吉利說話 (gat1lei6 syut3waa6) in Cantonese, loosely translated as "auspicious words or phrases". New Year couplets printed in gold letters on bright red paper, referred to as chunlian (春聯) or fai chun (揮春), are another way of expressing wishes for an auspicious new year. They probably predate the Ming dynasty (1368–1644), but did not become widespread until then. Today, they are ubiquitous with Chinese New Year.

Some of the most common greetings include:

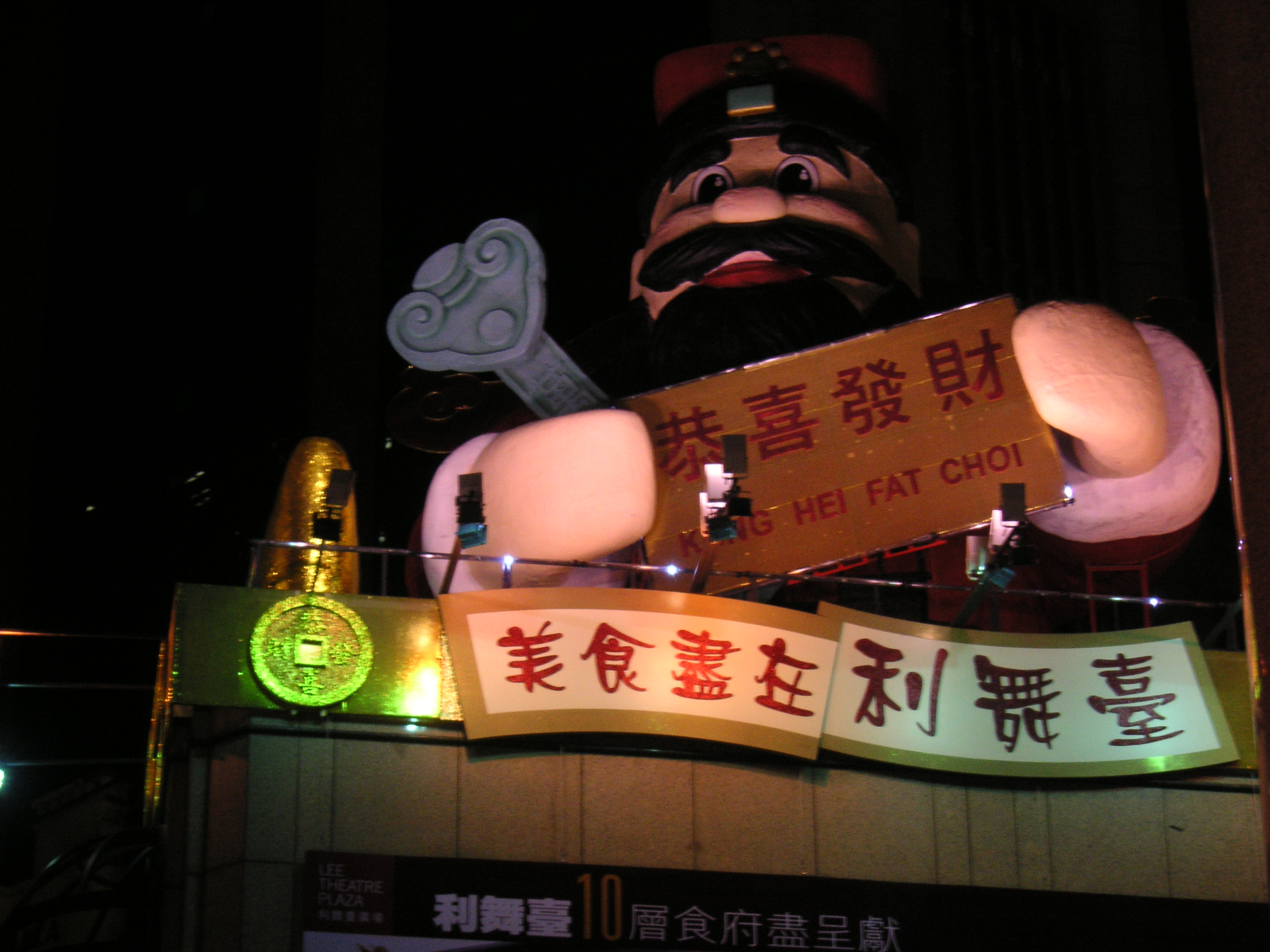
Gong Hei Fat Choi at Lee Theatre Plaza, Hong Kong

- Xin nian kuai le / San nin fai lok: simplified Chinese: 新年快乐; traditional Chinese: 新年快樂; pinyin: Xīnniánkuàilè; Jyutping: san1 nin4 faai3 lok6; Pe̍h-ōe-jī: Sin-nî khòai-lo̍k; Hakka: Sin Ngen Kai Lok; Taishanese: Slin Nen Fai Lok. A more contemporary greeting reflective of Western influences, it literally translates the greeting "Happy New Year" more common in the West. It is written in English as "xin nian kuai le". In northern parts of China, traditionally people say simplified Chinese: 过年好; traditional Chinese: 過年好; pinyin: Guònián Hǎo instead of simplified Chinese: 新年快乐; traditional Chinese: 新年快樂 (Xīnniánkuàile), to differentiate it from the international new year. And 過年好 (Guònián Hǎo) can be used from the first day to the fifth day of the Chinese New Year. However, 過年好 (Guònián Hǎo) is considered very short and therefore somewhat discourteous.
- Gong xi fa cai / Gong hei fat choi: simplified Chinese: 恭喜发财; traditional Chinese: 恭喜發財; pinyin: Gōngxǐfācái; Hokkien: Kiong hee huat chai (POJ: Kiong-hí hoat-châi); Cantonese: Gung1 hei2 faat3 coi4; Hakka: Gung hee fatt choi, which loosely translates as "congratulations and be prosperous". It is spelled varyingly in English, such as gung hay fat choy, gong hey fat choi, or kung hei fat choy. It is often mistakenly assumed to be synonymous with "Happy New Year". The saying is now commonly heard in English-speaking communities for greetings during Chinese New Year in parts of the world where there is a sizeable Chinese-speaking community, including overseas Chinese communities that have been resident for several generations, relatively recent immigrants from Greater China, and those who are transient migrants (particularly students).

Numerous other greetings exist, some of which may be exclaimed out loud to no one in particular in specific situations. For example, as breaking objects during the new year is considered inauspicious, one may then say 歲歲平安 (Suìsuì-píng'ān) immediately, which means "everlasting peace year after year". Suì (歲), meaning "age", is homophonous with 碎 (suì) (meaning "shatter"), in the demonstration of the Chinese love for wordplay in auspicious phrases. Similarly, 年年有餘 (niánnián yǒu yú), a wish for surpluses and bountiful harvests every year, plays on the word yú that can also refer to 魚 (yú meaning "fish"), making it a catch phrase for fish-based Chinese New Year dishes and for paintings or graphics of fish that are hung on walls or presented as gifts.

The most common auspicious greetings and sayings consist of four characters, such as the following:

- 金玉滿堂, Jīnyùmǎntáng – "May your wealth [gold and jade] come to fill a hall"
- 大展鴻圖, Dàzhǎnhóngtú – "May you realize your ambitions"
- 迎春接福, Yíngchúnjiēfú – "Greet the New Year and encounter happiness"
- 萬事如意, Wànshìrúyì – "May all your wishes be fulfilled"
- 吉慶有餘, Jíqìngyǒuyú – "May your happiness be without limit"
- 竹報平安, Zhúbàopíng'ān – "May you hear [in a letter] that all is well"
- 一本萬利, Yīběnwànlì – "May a small investment bring ten-thousandfold profits"
- 福壽雙全, Fúshòushuāngquán – "May your happiness and longevity be complete"
- 招財進寶, Zhāocáijìnbǎo – "When wealth is acquired, precious objects follow"

These greetings or phrases may also be used just before children receive their red packets, when gifts are exchanged, when visiting temples, or even when tossing the shredded ingredients of yusheng, particularly popular in Malaysia and Singapore. Children and their parents can also pray in a temple, in hopes of getting good blessings for the new year to come.

Children and teenagers sometimes jokingly use the phrase "恭喜發財，紅包拿來" (pinyin: gōngxǐfācái, hóngbāo nálái; Cantonese: 恭喜發財,利是逗來; Jyutping: gung^{1}hei^{2} faat^{3}coi^{4}, lei^{6} si^{6} dau^{6} loi^{4}), roughly translated as "Congratulations and be prosperous, now give me a red envelope!". In Hakka, the saying is more commonly said as Gung hee fatt choi, hung bao diu loi, which would be written as 恭喜發財，紅包逗來 – a mixture of the Cantonese and Mandarin variants of the saying.

In the 1960s, children in Hong Kong used to say 恭喜發財，利是逗來，斗零唔愛 (Cantonese, Gung Hei Fat Choy, Lai Si Tau Loi, Tau Ling M Ngoi), which was recorded in the pop song "Kowloon Hong Kong" by The Reynettes in 1966. Later, in the 1970s, children in Hong Kong used the saying: 恭喜發財，利是逗來，伍毫嫌少，壹蚊唔愛, roughly translated as "Congratulations and be prosperous, now give me a red envelope, fifty cents is too little, don't want a dollar either". It basically meant that they disliked small change – coins that were called "hard substance" (Cantonese: 硬嘢). Instead, they wanted "soft substance" (Cantonese: 軟嘢), which was either a ten dollar or a twenty dollar note.

== See also ==
- The Birthday of Che Kung
- Other celebrations of Lunar New Year in China:
  - Tibetan New Year (Losar)
  - Mongolian New Year (Tsagaan Sar)
- Celebrations of Lunar New Year in other parts of Asia:
  - Buryat New Year (Sagaalgan)
  - Korean New Year (Seollal)
  - Japanese New Year (Shōgatsu)
  - Mongolian New Year (Tsagaan Sar)
  - Vietnamese New Year (Tết Nguyên Đán)
- Similar Asian Lunisolar New Year celebrations that occur in April:
  - Burmese New Year (Thingyan)
  - Cambodian New Year (Chaul Chnam Thmey)
  - Lao New Year (Pii Mai)
  - Sri Lankan New Year (Aluth Avuruddu)
  - Thai New Year (Songkran)
- Chinese New Year Gregorian Holiday in Malaysia
  - Malaysia Chinese New Year (Tahun Baru Cina)
  - Indonesian Chinese New Year (Imlek)
- Lunar New Year fireworks display in Hong Kong
- Suguo

== Bibliography ==
- “致全国革命造反派和全体革命同志倡议书——破除旧习俗，春节不休假，展开群众性夺 权斗争” (A Proposal to All Revolutionary Rebels and Comrades Nationwide—Break the Old Customs, No Holiday During Spring Festival, Launch a Mass Struggle for Power). People’s Daily, January 30, 1967, 3.
- “在山西定襄县择里大队落户的北京知识青年发出倡议 各地插队知识青年春节不回城里和贫下中农一起战斗迎接新胜利” (Beijing educated youth settled in Zeli Production Brigade, Dingxiang County, Shanxi Province, issued a proposal: Educated youth sent to the countryside should not return to the city for the Spring Festival, but fight alongside the poor and lower-middle peasants to welcome new victories). People’s Daily, January 27, 1969, 1.
- Beijing No. 1 Middle School Red Guards. “Let Us Celebrate a ‘Proletarian Cultural Revolution Holiday,’” in China’s Cultural Revolution, 1966–1969: Not a Dinner Party, ed. Michael Schoenhals, 227-28. NY: ME Sharpe, 1996.
- Reporting Team of Liji Commune. “要节约过春节,” (Save money for the Spring Festival), People’s Daily, January 22, 1971, 4.
- “坚决执行毛主席的抓革命、促生产的方针，夺取革命、生产双胜利国务院发出今年春节 不放假的通知” (Resolutely implement Chairman Mao's policy of "grasping revolution and promoting production" to achieve a double victory in revolution and production. The State Council issued a notice that there will be no holiday for the Spring Festival this year), People’s Daily, January 30, 1967, 1.
- Shanghai Workers Revolutionary Rebel General Headquarters et al. “Revolutionize the Spring Festival,” in China’s Cultural Revolution, 1966–1969: Not a Dinner Party, ed. Michael Schoenhals, 222-27. NY: ME Sharpe, 1996.
- Torigian, Joseph. The Party's Interests Come First: The Life of Xi Zhongxun, Father of Xi Jinping. United States: Stanford University Press, 2025.
- Welch, Patricia Bjaaland (1997). Chinese New Year. Oxford University Press. ISBN 978-0-19-587730-4.
- Xiao, Fang, Juwen Zhang, and Bill Long. “The Predicament, Revitalization, and Future of Traditional Chinese Festivals.” Western Folklore 76, no. 2 (2017): 181–96. https://www.jstor.org/stable/44790971
