= List of people from Nueva Ecija =

The following is a list of notable people who were either born in, lived in, are current residents of, or are closely associated with the province of Nueva Ecija.

== National heroes and patriots ==
- Antonio Bautista – air force pilot and Medal of Valor awardee
- Mariano Llanera – vice commander of the Philippine Revolutionary Army
- Benito Natividad – brigadier general of the Philippine Revolutionary Army
- Mamerto Natividad – commanding general of the Philippine Revolutionary Arm in Central Luzon
- Juan Pajota – World War II guerrilla officer who played a key role in the Raid at Cabanatuan
- Manuel Tinio – youngest general of the Philippine Revolutionary Army and later governor of Nueva Ecija
- Pantaleon Valmonte – general of the Philippine Revolutionary Army

== Entertainment ==
- Jason Abalos – actor and politician
- JC Alcantara – actor
- Raymond Bagatsing – actor
- RK Bagatsing – actor
- Jose Balagtas – film director and politician
- Paolo Ballesteros – actor, comedian and drag queen
- Heber Bartolome – folk singer
- Ruel S. Bayani – film and television director
- Kathryn Bernardo – actress and singer; highest-grossing Filipino actress of all time
- Bea Binene – actress
- Nida Blanca – actress
- Gavin "Ser Geybin" Capinpin – vlogger
- Anthony Castelo – singer
- Val Castelo – singer and actor
- Ryza Cenon – actress
- Manuel Chua – actor and model
- Nestor de Villa – actor
- Darren Espanto – singer
- Cristy Fermin – talk show host
- Bella Flores – actress
- Marvin Gagarin – singer
- BB Gandanghari – actress and model
- Katrina Halili – actress
- JaMill – content creators
- Small Laude – vlogger
- Rio Locsin – actress
- Diana Mackey – actress and beauty queen
- Rose Marielle Mamaclay – singer
- Jayzam Manabat – vlogger
- Kaori Oinuma – actress; former PBB housemate
- Erika Padilla – actress, TV host and model
- Daniel Padilla – actor; Box Office King and FAMAS Best Actor
- Rommel Padilla – actor and politician
- Fred Panopio – singer and actor
- Coleen Perez – actress
- Kurt Perez – former child actor; StarStruck Kids Ultimate Male Survivor
- Lito Pimentel – actor
- Anita Ramos Camba – television producer and director
- Willie Revillame – actor, businessman and longtime host of major Philippine noontime variety shows
- Nikki Samonte – actress
- Rosalyn Sirikit Santiago – Bb. Pilipinas 2006 1st runner-up
- Vilma Santos – actress and politician; FAMAS Hall of Fame inductee
- Yen Santos – actress; Gawad Urian Best Actress
- Romnick Sarmenta – actor; dubbed as the "Teenage King" in the 1980s
- Vic Silayan – actor
- Val Sotto – actor, singer and politician
- Vic Sotto – actor, television host, and comedian; multi-awarded Box Office King
- Chanel Olive Thomas – Bb. Pilipinas Supranational 2017
- Eula Valdez – actress
- Xilhouete – drag performer

== Journalism ==
- Philip Agustin – journalist and newspaper editor
- Louie Beltran – broadcast journalist, first editor-in-chief of the Philippine Daily Inquirer
- Frankie Evangelista – broadcast journalist and newspaper columnist
- Athena Imperial – GMA News reporter and Miss Earth - Water 2011
- Anthony Taberna – news anchor and radio broadcaster
- Joe Taruc – DZRH radio broadcaster

== Education, literature and the arts ==
- Lamberto Antonio – poet and writer; Palanca awardee
- Jose Balagtas – film director and writer
- Lino Brocka – director and National Artist for Film
- Behn Cervantes – artist, activist and film director
- Elito "Amangpintor" Circa – indigenous painter
- Emmanuel de Guzman – 12th president of the Polytechnic University of the Philippines.
- Felipe Padilla de Leon – composer and National Artist for Music
- Rony V. Diaz – writer and Palanca awardee
- Damiana Eugenio – writer known as the "Mother of Philippine Folklore."
- Doreen Fernandez – food writer and cultural historian
- Lázaro Francisco – novelist and National Artist for Literature.
- Ramon H. Lopez – painter
- E. Arsenio Manuel – academic, historian and anthropologist
- Mario Parial – painter and sculptor
- Rogelio R. Sikat – novelist, playwright and Palanca awardee

== Politics and government ==
- Richard Albano – retired PNP General
- Jaime Bautista – businessman and former Secretary of Transportation
- Sonny Belmote – former speaker of the House of Representatives
- Ponciano Bernardo – former mayor of Quezon City
- Alice Bulos – Filipino American civil rights leader and Democratic Party delegate
- Oscar Calderon – former chief of the Philippine National Police
- Oscar Castelo – former secretary of national defense and secretary of justice
- Delfin Castro – AFP major general
- Perci Cendaña – representative, Akbayan Party-list
- Hermogenes Concepcion – former senator
- Hermogenes Concepcion Jr. – former solicitor general and associate justice of the Supreme Court of the Philippines
- Epifanio de los Santos – historian and writer who served as Nueva Ecija representative to the Malolos Congress and later governor of Nueva Ecija
- Jaime de los Santos – former chief of staff and commanding general of the Philippine Army, former commander of the United Nations Transitional Administration in East Timor
- Eduardo del Rosario – first Secretary of Human Settlements and Urban Development
- Faustino Dy – former Governor of Isabela
- Randy Escolango – undersecretary at the Department of Health
- Juan Feleo – peasant leader
- Josie Fitial – former First Lady of the Northern Mariana Islands
- Isauro Gabaldón – former resident commissioner of the Philippines to the United States House of Representatives
- Dr. Paulino J. García – former Secretary of Health
- Rafael Ileto – AFP General and former Secretary of National Defense
- Mark Jimenez – former congressman of Manila and consultant of former Philippine President Joseph Ejercito Estrada
- Eduardo Joson – WWII guerrilla leader and former governor of Nueva Ecija
- Juan Liwag – former senator
- Cielo Magno – economist; former Undersecretary of the Department of Finance
- Rafael V. Mariano – former partylist representative for Anakpawis and former Secretary of Agrarian Reform
- Ameurfina Melencio-Herrera – lawyer and second woman to be appointed as Associate Justice of the Supreme Court of the Philippines
- Sedfrey Ordoñez – lawyer and former Secretary of Justice
- Robin Padilla – actor and politician; ran for Vice Governor of Nueva Ecija in 1995.
- Bernardo Pardo – Supreme Court Associate Justice
- Emerson Pascual – representative, Nueva Ecija's 4th district
- Kokoy Salvador – representative, Nueva Ecija's 2nd district
- Vicente "Tito" Sotto III – senate president, actor, and musician
- Mika Suansing – representative, Nueva Ecija's 1st district
- Jay Vergara – representative, Nueva Ecija's 3rd district
- Joseph Gilbert Violago – representative, Nueva Ecija's 2nd district
- Reynaldo Wycoco – former director of the national Bureau of Investigation

== Religion ==
- Emma de Guzman – Marian visionary and co-founder of La Pietà International Prayer Group
- Frederick Kriekenbeek – Catholic priest and pioneering exorcist in the Archdiocese of Cebu
- Jose Elmer Mangalinao – Roman Catholic bishop
- Alberto Ramento – ninth supreme bishop and former chairperson of the Supreme Council of Bishops of the Philippine Independent Church
- Oscar Solis – bishop of Salt Lake City in Utah since 2017, first Filipino-American Catholic bishop

== Sports ==
- Carlo Biado – pool player and world champion
- Hernando Castelo – sports shooter
- Samboy de Leon – basketball player
- Japoy Lizardo – taekwondo athlete and commercial model; Asian Games bronze medalist
- Frances Molina – Premier Volleyball League MVP
- Ferdinand Pascual – international basketball referee

== Others ==
- Alexis Belonio – inventor
- Alice Eduardo – businesswoman; founder and CEO of Sta. Elena Construction and Development Corporation
- Rosario and Silvino Encarnacion – Ramon Magsaysay Award recipients
- Rolando Galman – alleged assissin of Ninoy Aquino
- Julian Marcelino – mass murderer
- Sergio Ortiz-Luis Jr. – Chairman of PCCI; Father of Philippine Export
- Aniceto Sobrepeña – businessman; former president of Metrobank Foundation
- Mary Jane Veloso – Filipino migrant worker who was sentenced to death in Indonesia for drug trafficking in 2010. Her case drew international attention and widespread advocacy efforts, leading to a stay of execution in 2015.
