= Reactions to the Philippine drug war =

The following article details the reactions, both local and international, to the Philippine drug war.

== Local ==
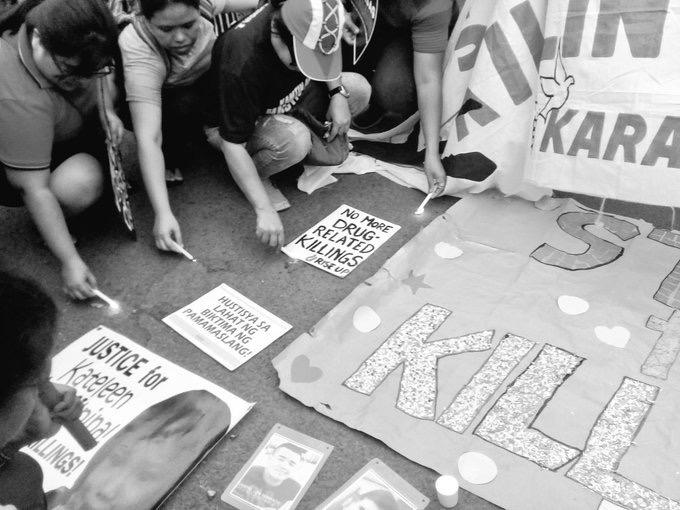
Protest by local human rights groups, remembering the victims of the drug war, October 2019.

Senator Risa Hontiveros, an opponent of Duterte, said that the drug war was a political strategy intended to persuade people that "suddenly the historically most important issue of poverty was no longer the most important."

President Duterte claimed to recognize poverty as a key problem of the country; the administration's 10-point Socioeconomic Agenda, no.8 is to improve social protection programs, including the Conditional Cash Transfer Program, to protect the poor. President Duterte signed Republic Act (RA) No. 11315, or the Community-Based Monitoring System (CBMS) Act. RA 11315 authorizing the government to adopt a CBMS.

De Lima expressed frustration with the attitude of Filipinos towards extrajudicial killings: "they think that it's good for peace and order. We now have death squads on a national scale, but I'm not seeing public outrage."

President Duterte has denied involvement in the ‘Davao Death Squad.’ “It started in Davao as a political issue. As a matter of fact, you go to Davao, the DDS is not really a DDS. It was during the time ‘Sparrow versus the DDS of government,” President Duterte said. The President has pointed out that not a single case was filed against him when Senator Leila de Lima was Chair of the Commission on Human Rights for 7 years.

During his fourth SONA, the President called on officials to work towards lifting 6 million Filipinos out of poverty. According to data from Pulse Asia surveys, the poverty-stricken, classes D and E, never gave the President approval and trust ratings below 70% throughout the first half of his presidency. According to a Pulse Asia opinion poll conducted from July 2 to 8, 2016, 91% of Filipinos "trusted" Duterte. A survey conducted between February and May 2017, by PEW research center, found that 78% of the Filipinos support the drug war. A survey in September 2017 showed 88% support for the drug war, while 73% believed that extrajudicial executions were occurring. An independent survey in September 2017 showed that 88% of Filipinos support the drug war. As of 2019, it is at 82%.

Dela Rosa announced in September 2016 that the drug war had "reduced the supply of illegal drugs in the country by some 80 to 90 percent", and said that the War was already being won, based on statistical and observational evidence.

Aljazeera reported that John Collins, director of the London School of Economics International Drug Policy Project, said: "Targeting the supply side can have short-term effects. However, these are usually limited to creating market chaos rather than reducing the size of the market. ... What you learn is that you're going to war with a force of economics and the force of economics tends to win out: supply, demand and price tend to find their own way." He said it was a "certainty" that "the Philippines' new 'war' will fail and society will emerge worse off from it."

Malacañang and the chief of police declared the drug war a success, claiming that supply has been cut by 90 percent, with the government regaining authority at national penitentiary Bilibid where incarcerated leaders of cartels continue to control the narcotics chain from their swish cells.

In June 2017 the price of methamphetamine on the streets of Manila was lower than it had been at the start of Duterte's presidency, according to Philippine Drug Enforcement Agency data. Gloria Lai of the International Drug Policy Consortium commented: "If prices have fallen, it's an indication that enforcement actions have not been effective".

The Chairman of the Philippine Chamber of Commerce and Industry, Sergio Ortiz-Luis Jr., quelled fears that foreign investors might be put off by the increasing rate of killings in the country, explaining at a press conference on September 19, 2016, that investors only care about profit: "They don't care if 50% of Filipinos are killing each other so long as they're not affected". On the following day the Wall Street Journal reported that foreign investors, who account for half of the activity on the Philippine Stock Exchange, had been "hightailing it out of town", selling $500 million worth of shares over the past month, putting pressure on the Philippine peso which was close to its weakest point since 2009.

The Archbishop of Manila Luis Antonio Tagle acknowledged that people were right to be "worried about extrajudicial killings", along with other "form[s] of murder": abortion, unfair labor practices, wasting of food, and "selling illegal drugs, pushing the youth into vices".

A Redemptorist Brother named Jun Santiago, whose Sinirangan coffeeshop beneath Baclaran Church's bell tower closed in 2021 due to the COVID-19 pandemic lockdowns, reopened his social enterprise later the same year as Silingan Coffee, employing as baristas some of the wives, mothers, sisters and daughters of victims of the Philippine drug war's alleged extrajudicial killings.

== International ==
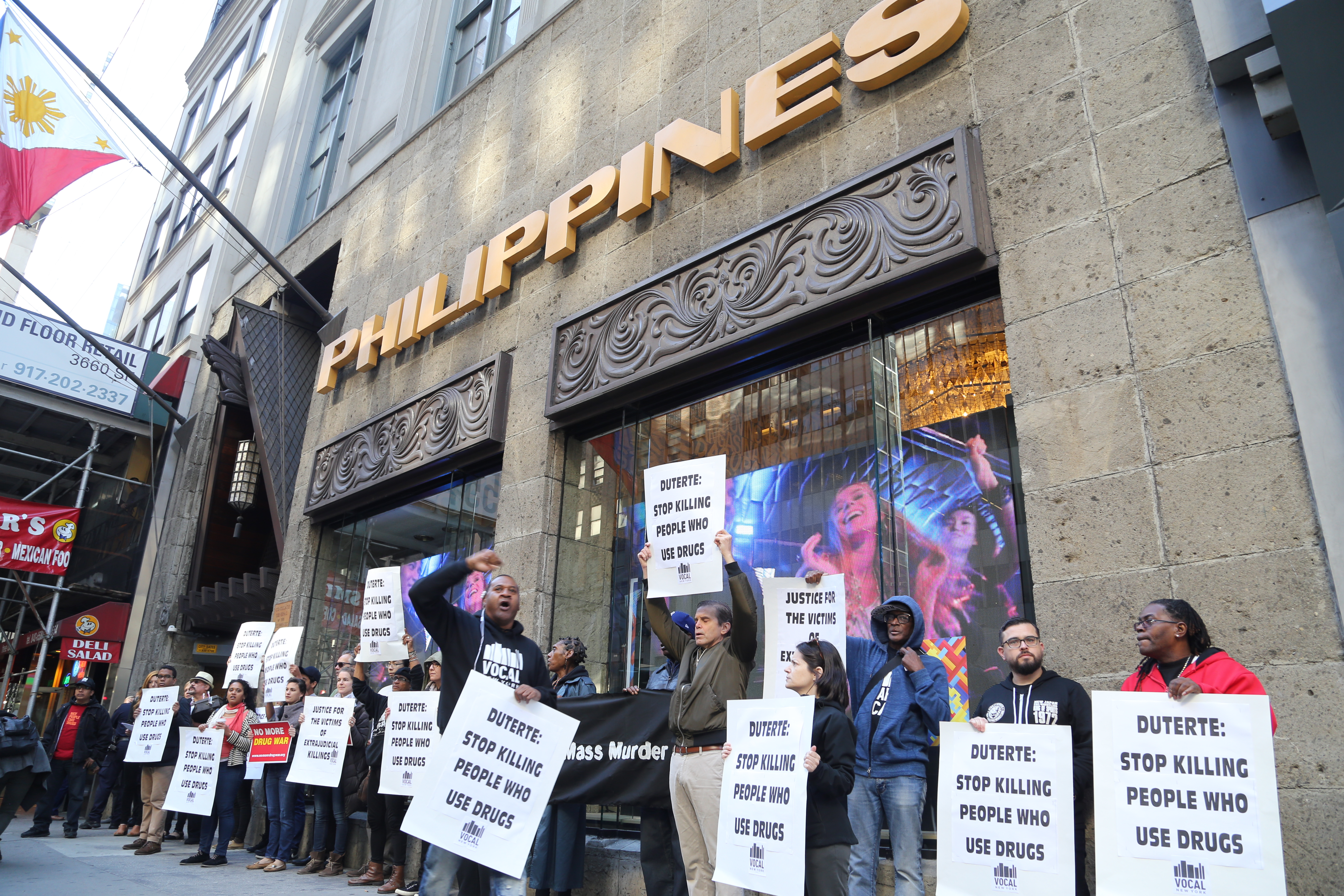
Protest against the Philippine war on drugs in front of the Philippine Consulate General in New York City. The protesters are holding placards which urge Duterte to stop killing drug users.

During his official state visit to the Philippines in January 2017, Japanese Prime Minister Shinzō Abe said: "On countering illegal drugs, we want to work together with the Philippines through relevant measures of support". He offered financial assistance for Philippine drug rehabilitation centers, and made no mention of deaths resulting from the drug war. He announced an $800 million Official Development Assistance package to "promote economic and infrastructure development".

In June 2016, Gary Song-Huann Lin, the representative of Taiwan in the Philippines, welcomed Duterte's plan to declare a war against criminality and illegal drugs. He said Taiwan is ready to help the Philippines combat cross-border crimes like human and drug trafficking. He later reasserted on October that Taiwan was an indispensable partner to the Philippines’ war on drugs. In 2018, Ricardo Parojinog, an alleged narcopolitician at Ozamiz and the brother of Reynaldo, was detained in Taiwan for illegal immigration and later deported to the Philippines; he was then found dead in September 2020.

On July 19, 2016, Lingxiao Li, spokesman for the Chinese Embassy in Manila, announced China's support for the drug war: "China fully understands that the Philippine government under the leadership of H. E. President Rodrigo Duterte has taken it as a top priority to crack down on drug-related crimes. China has expressed explicitly to the new administration China's willingness for effective cooperation in this regard, and would like to work out a specific plan of action with the Philippine side." The statement made no reference to extrajudicial killings, and called illegal drugs the "common enemy of mankind". On September 27, the Chinese Ambassador Zhao Jianhua reiterated that "Illegal drugs are the enemy of all mankind" in a statement confirming Chinese support for the Duterte administration.

Indonesian National Police Chief General Tito Karnavian commented in regards to Indonesia's rejection of a similar policy for Indonesia: "Shoot on sight policy leads to abuse of power. We still believe in the presumption of innocence. Lethal actions are only warranted if there is an immediate threat against officers... there should not be a deliberate attempt to kill". In September 2016 Budi Waseso, head of Indonesia's National Anti-Narcotics Agency (BNN), said that he was currently contemplating copying the Philippines' hardline tactics against drug traffickers. He said that the Agency planned a major increase in armaments and recruitment. An Agency spokesman later attempted to downplay the comments, stating: "We can't shoot criminals just like that, we have to follow the rules." Most recently, Indonesian President Joko "Jokowi" Widodo used the language of "emergency" to ramp up the country's war on drugs, in a move that observers see as "in step with Filipino President Rodrigo Duterte's" own campaign against the illegal drug trade.

On September 9, the Prime Minister of New Zealand, John Key spoke to Duterte about "arguably better" ways to deal with drug issues. The then Prime Minister commented "Now he didn't really give us a direct answer to what happens when and if innocent people get associated with what is essentially extra-judicial killings." The New Zealand Government has repeatedly spoken to Duterte regarding his war on drugs across several administrations since and there was some consideration in barring Duterte from a layover arrival in New Zealand following the 2016 APEC summit in Peru, due to his human rights record, mainly as a result of the war on drugs.

On October 16, prior to Duterte's departure for a state visit to Brunei, the President said he would seek the support of that country for his campaign against illegal drugs and Brunei's continued assistance to achieve peace and progress in Mindanao. This was responded to positively by Brunei Sultan Hassanal Bolkiah the next day according to Philippine Foreign Affairs Secretary Perfecto Yasay Jr. Malaysia's Deputy Prime Minister Ahmad Zahid Hamidi said "he respects the method undertaken by the Philippine government as it is suitable for their country's situation", while stressing that "Malaysia will never follow such an example as we have our own methods such as seizing assets used in drug trafficking with resultant funds to be channelled back towards rehabilitation, prevention and enforcement of laws against drugs".

On December 3, 2016, Duterte said that during a phone conversation on the previous day with then-United States President-elect Donald Trump, Trump had invited him to Washington, and endorsed his drug-war policy, assuring him that it was being conducted "the right way". Duterte described the conversation:

I could sense a good rapport, an animated President-elect Trump. And he was wishing me success in my campaign against the drug problem. [...] He understood the way we are handling it, and I said that there's nothing wrong in protecting a country. It was a bit very encouraging in the sense that I supposed that what he really wanted to say was that we would be the last to interfere in the affairs of your own country.

On December 16, Duterte and Singaporean President Tony Tan and Prime Minister Lee Hsien Loong agreed to work together in the fight against terrorism and illegal drugs. In a meeting during a state visit both parties discussed areas of cooperation between the two countries.

The European Parliament expressed concern over extrajudicial killings in a resolution September 15, stating: "Drug trafficking and drug abuse in the Philippines remain a serious national and international concern, note MEPs. They understand that millions of people are hurt by the high level of drug addiction and its consequences in the country but are also concerned by the 'extraordinarily high numbers killed during police operations in the context of an intensified anti-crime and anti-drug campaign."

In response, the Foreign Affairs Secretary Alan Peter Cayetano stated that the European Parliament had crossed a red line when it called for interfering in the Philippines’ sovereignty. The resolution was said to be "biased, incomplete and even wrong information and does not reflect the true situation on the ground". In addition, the European Parliament was also criticized when the Philippine presidential spokesperson said that it is inconsistent that the European Parliament will condemn the war against drugs, which is now also being financed partly by the European Union especially in drug rehabilitation projects.

In response, at a press conference Duterte made an obscene hand gesture and claimed that the European Parliament's members were "hypocrites" whose colonial-era ancestors killed "thousands" of Arabs and other peoples. Duterte stated that "When I read the EU condemnation I told them fuck you. You are doing it in atonement for your sins. They are now strict because they have guilty feelings. Who did I kill? Assuming that it's true? 1,700? How many have they killed?"

EU Trade Commissioner Cecilia Malmström, in a visit to the Philippines in March 2017, warned that unless the Philippines addresses human rights issues, the EU would cancel tariff-free export of 6,000 products under the Generalized System of Preferences. Presidential spokesman Ernesto Abella dismissed the concerns, saying that they revealed European ignorance.

On December 24, U.S. Senators Marco Rubio, Edward Markey, and Christopher Coons expressed their concerns regarding the alleged extrajudicial killings and human rights violations in Duterte's war on drugs. Through a letter sent to the U.S. Department of State, they noted that instead of addressing the drug problem, investing in treatment programs or approaching the issue with an emphasis on health, Duterte has "pledged to kill another 20,000 to 30,000 people, many simply because they suffer from a drug use disorder." Rubio, Markey and Coons also questioned U.S. secretary of state John Kerry's pledge of $32-million funding for training and other law-enforcement assistance during his visit to Manila. In May 2017, Senator Rubio, along with Senator Ben Cardin, filed a bipartisan bill in the U.S. Senate to restrict the exportation of weapons from the U.S. to the Philippines.

The US ambassador in Manila announced on December 14, 2016, that the US foreign aid agency, the Millennium Challenge Corporation, would cancel funding to the Philippines due to "significant concerns around rule of law and civil liberties in the Philippines," explaining that aid recipients were required to demonstrate a "commitment to the rule of law, due process and respect for human rights." The MCC had disbursed $434 million to the Philippines from 2011 to 2015. The funding denial was expected to lead to the cancellation of a five-year infrastructure development project previously agreed to in December 2015.

In February 2017, former Colombian President César Gaviria wrote an opinion piece on The New York Times to warn Duterte and the administration that the drug war is "unwinnable" and "disastrous," citing his own experiences as the President of Colombia. He also criticized the alleged extrajudicial killings and vigilantism, saying these are "the wrong ways to go." According to Gaviria, the war on drugs is essentially a war on people. Gaviria suggested that improving public health and safety, strengthening anti-corruption measures, investing in sustainable development, decriminalizing drug consumption, and strengthening the regulation of therapeutic goods would enhance supply and demand reduction. In response to Gaviria, Duterte called him an "idiot," and said the issue of extrajudicial killings should be set aside, and that there were four to five million drug addicts in the country.

In September 2017, Foreign Affairs Secretary Alan Peter Cayetano delivered a speech at the 72nd United Nations General Assembly, during which he argued that extrajudicial killings were a myth, and that the drug war, which according to Human Rights Watch had resulted in 13,000 deaths to date, was being waged to "protect (the) human rights of...the most vulnerable (citizens)." In October 2017, Cayetano was interviewed by al-Jazeera. He asserted that all 3,900 people who were killed in the drug war had fought against the police, and that all of the killings were being investigated.

In January 2018, Philippines' presidential spokesman Harry Roque relayed that Indian Prime Minister Narendra Modi had expressed support for Duterte's campaign against narcotics and also called for stronger cooperation against illegal drugs.

On January 17, 2019, Sri Lankan President Maithripala Sirisena, on his state visit in the country, praised the war on drugs campaign, saying that the campaign is "an example to the whole world." Two days later, human rights groups had expressed alarm over the statement of Sirisena.

On May 27, 2020, a Human Rights Watch report showed the Impact of the "war on drugs" in the Philippines. Children and thousands of people have been killed during anti-drug raids, which the authorities have called "collateral damage," since President Rodrigo Duterte launched his "war on drugs" on June 30, 2016.

== International Criminal Court ==
The International Criminal Court (ICC) chief prosecutor Fatou Bensouda expressed concern over the drug-related killings in the country on October 13, 2016. In her statement, Bensouda said that the high officials of the country "seem to condone such killings and further seem to encourage State forces and civilians alike to continue targeting these individuals with lethal force." She also warned that any person in the country who provokes "or engages in acts of mass violence by ordering, requesting, encouraging or contributing, and in any other manner, to the commission of crimes within the jurisdiction of ICC" will be prosecuted before the court. About that, Duterte is open for the investigation by the ICC, Malacañang said.

In February 2018, the ICC announced a “preliminary examination” into killings linked to the Philippine government's “war on drugs”. Prosecutor Bensouda said the court will “analyze crimes allegedly committed in [the Philippines] since at least 1 July 2016." Duterte's spokesman Harry Roque dismissed the ICC's decision as a "waste of the court's time and resources". In March, Duterte announced his intention to withdraw the Philippines from the ICC tribunal, which is a process that takes a year.

In August 2018, activists and eight families of victims of the drug war filed a second petition with the ICC, accusing Duterte of murder and crimes against humanity, and calling for his indictment for thousands of extrajudicial killings, which according to the 50-page complaint, included "brazen" executions by police acting with impunity. Neri Colmenares, a lawyer acting for the group, said that "Duterte is personally liable for ordering state police to undertake mass killings." Duterte threatened to arrest the ICC prosecutor Bensouda.

In July 2023, ICC rejected an appeal by the government against the resumption of "war on drugs" killings.

== United Nations Human Rights Council action ==
Map showing the voting map of countries in regards to the 2019 United Nations Human Rights Council draft resolution on the Philippine drug war.

On June 19, 2018, 38 United Nations member states released a collective statement through the United Nations Human Rights Council (UNHRC), calling on the Philippines and President Duterte to stop the killings in the country and probe abuses caused by the drug war. The 38 nations included Australia, Austria, Belgium, Bulgaria, Canada, Croatia, Cyprus, Czech Republic, Denmark, Estonia, Finland, France, Georgia, Germany, Greece, Iceland, Ireland, Italy, Latvia, Liechtenstein, Lithuania, Luxembourg, Malta, Macedonia, Montenegro, the Netherlands, New Zealand, Poland, Portugal, Romania, Slovakia, Slovenia, Spain, Sweden, Switzerland, Ukraine, the United Kingdom and the United States.

On July 11, 2019, the UNHRC adopted an Iceland-proposed resolution calling on the council to look into the rising homicides related to the drug war and the human rights situation in the country. In response, President Rodrigo Duterte reacted to the resolution saying Iceland has no crime because its people "just go about eating ice" while Senators Vicente Sotto III and Imee Marcos said that countries who voted in favor of the resolution lacked the moral high ground due to abortion being legal in most of these countries.

Malacañang called the resolution "outrageous interference" in the sovereignty of the Philippines as it has no jurisdiction to do so. The Philippine government also said that Iceland may have been fed with inaccurate information about the Philippines’ war on drugs, as the former has no embassy in the Philippines.

The Presidential Spokesperson called the resolution "grotesquely one-sided, outrageously narrow, and maliciously partisan." "It reeks of nauseating politics completely devoid of respect for the sovereignty of our country, even as it is bereft of the gruesome realities of the drug menace," he added.

According to the Presidential Human Rights Committee Secretariat (PHRCS) the government didn't find the need for such a country-specific inquiry on the Philippines as there are so many existing mechanisms wherein the information in the country can be accessed.

The Philippine government continues to subject itself to the universal periodic review every four years as well as different treaty bodies periodically. Despite the mechanisms that are already in place, Iceland resorted to such a move. "The position of the Philippine government is that we will not respect such a resolution, but we will continue engaging the UN through the different mechanisms which we already availed and always respected throughout the years. There was a certain sense of frustration because of the cases that were filed before the ICC without first going through the domestic remedies and the domestic channels, wherein remedies can be considered to be able to address these cases that were brought before the attention of the ICC. So the Philippine government thought it was very disrespectful and violative of the processes," PHRCS Undersecretary Severo Catura said.

UNHRC Draft Resolution A/HRC/41/L.20: Promotion and protection of human rights in the Philippines
Affirmative (18)	Negative (14)	Abstain (15)
1. Argentina; 2. Australia; 3. Austria; 4. Bahamas; 5. Bulgaria; 6. Croatia; 7. Czech Republic; 8. Denmark; 9. Fiji; 10. Iceland; 11. Italy; 12. Mexico; 13. Peru; 14. Slovakia; 15. Spain; 16. Ukraine; 17. United Kingdom; 18. Uruguay	1. Angola; 2. Bahrain; 3. Cameroon; 4. China; 5. Cuba; 6. Egypt; 7. Eritrea; 8. Hungary; 9. India; 10. Iraq; 11. Philippines; 12. Qatar; 13. Saudi Arabia; 14. Somalia	1. Afghanistan; 2. Bangladesh; 3. Brazil; 4. Burkina Faso; 5. Chile; 6. Democratic Republic of the Congo; 7. Japan; 8. Nepal; 9. Nigeria; 10. Pakistan; 11. Rwanda; 12. Senegal; 13. South Africa; 14. Togo; 15. Tunisia

In June 2020, a report by the UN Human Rights Office condemned the Philippine president's so-called "war on drugs" and stated that more than 8,000 people and at least 248 human rights defenders, journalists and trade unionists have died over the past five years.

Two months after the UN revealed that the Philippine government's policies related to its war on drugs have caused systematic violations including killings, arbitrary detentions, and vilification of dissent, the government introduced HRC Resolution No. 45. There was no voting for the Resolution. It requested High Commissioner Michelle Bachelet to provide support for the country in the continued fulfilment of its international human rights obligations and commitments.

Following the UN Report, High Commissioner Michelle Bachelet called for the United Nations Human Rights Council to consider supporting new accountability measures against perpetrators of extrajudicial killings in the Philippines’ war on illegal drugs while also reiterating concerns over proposed new anti-terror legislation, the Anti-Terrorism Act of 2020 stating "The recent passage of the new Anti-Terrorism Act heightens our concerns about the blurring of important distinctions between criticism, criminality and terrorism, the law could have a further chilling effect on human rights and humanitarian work, hindering support to vulnerable and marginalized communities… So I would I urge the President to refrain from signing the law, and to initiate a broad-based consultation process to draft legislation that can effectively prevent and counter violent extremism, but which contains some safeguards to prevent its misuse against people engaged in peaceful criticism and advocacy." According to Ms. Bachelet's office, the campaign against illegal drugs has been linked to the deaths of 73 children. These figures "are not exhaustive…the youngest victim was five months old", the OHCHR report noted. Echoing these concerns, Ms. Bachelet underscored that the operation was being carried out "without due regard for the rule of law, due process and the human rights of people who may be using or selling drugs. The report finds that the killings have been widespread and systematic – and they are ongoing." The High Commissioner also addressed long-running concerns of "near-impunity" for perpetrators of illegal killings during police operations highlighted in the report. It details how the Philippines Police Internal Affairs Service (IAS) automatically investigates any deaths that occur during police operations, and yet of more than 4,580 investigations, "the Government has cited only one case – that of 17-year-old Kian delos Santos – where three police officers were convicted of a drug campaign-related killing". Ms. Bachelet added: "The State has an obligation to conduct independent investigations into the grave violations we have documented. In the absence of clear and measurable outcomes from domestic mechanisms, the Council should consider options for international accountability measures."
