= Cabiao =

Municipality in Nueva Ecija, Philippines

Cabiao Kabyaw
- Municipality
- Municipality of Cabiao
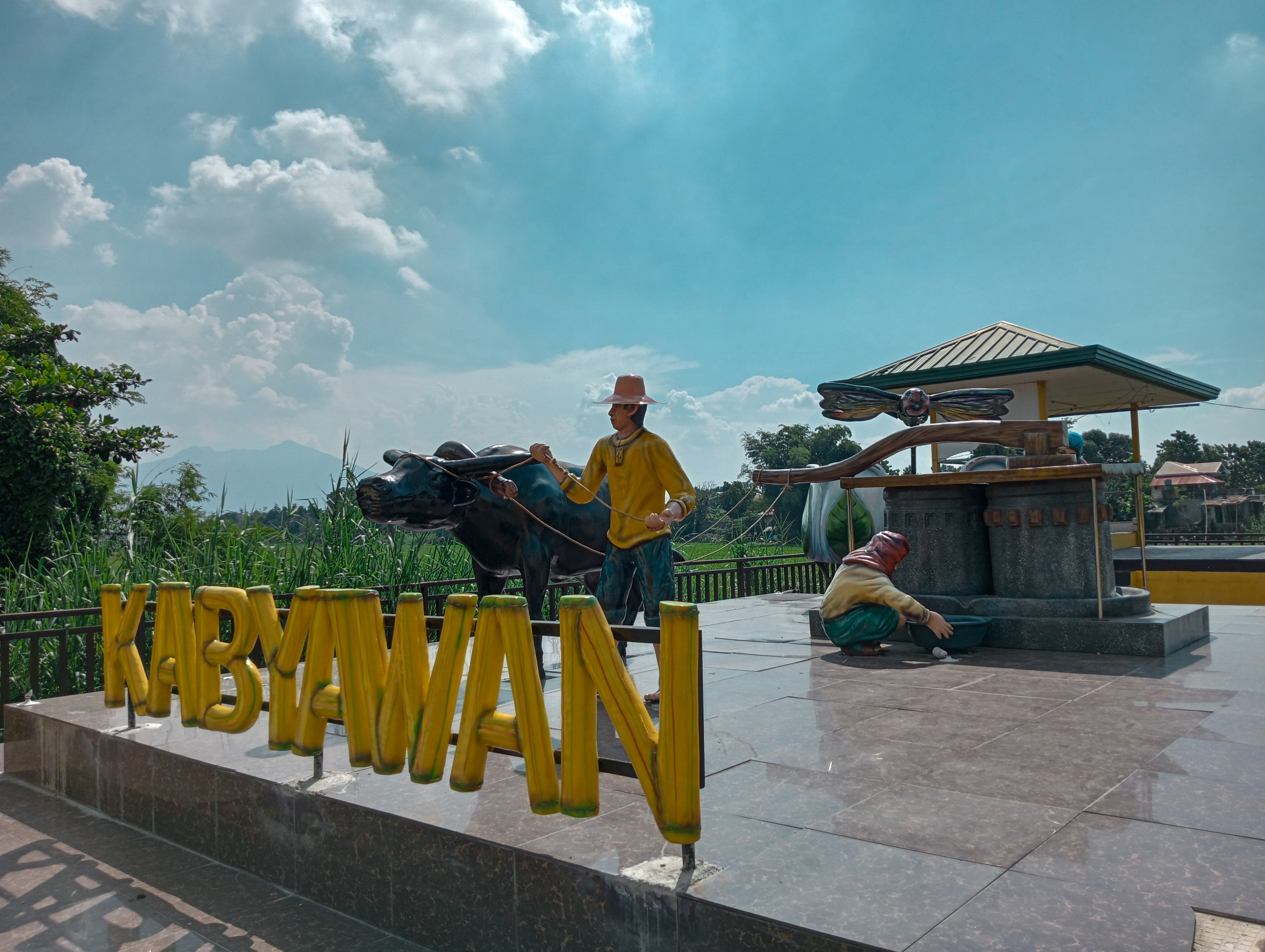
- Kabyawan Monument

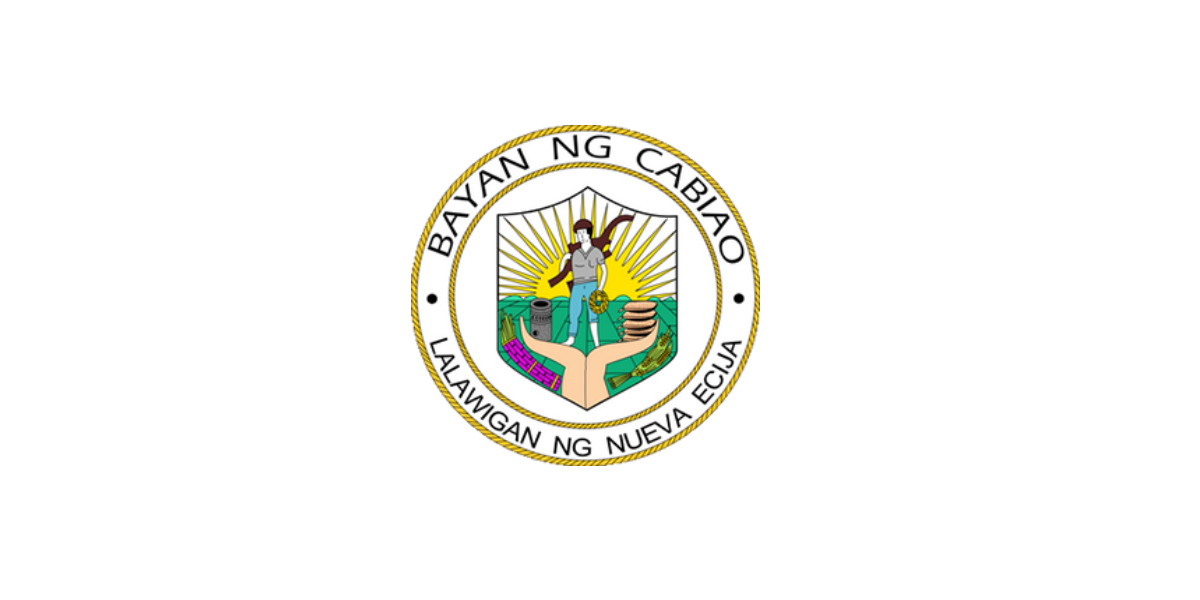
- Flag Seal
- Nicknames: Site of the First Cry of Nueva Ecija; Sweet Sorghum Capital of Nueva Ecija
- Mottoes: Sa Maunlad na Cabiao, Kabyawenyo Ang bida Igpaw Kabyaw
- Map of Nueva Ecija with Cabiao highlighted
- Interactive map of Cabiao
- Location within Philippines Location within Asia Location within Earth
- Coordinates: 15°15′08″N 120°51′27″E
- Country: Philippines
- Region: Central Luzon
- Province: Nueva Ecija
- District: 4th district
- Founded: Between 1765-1767
- Incorporated to Pampanga: 1797
- Incorporated to Nueva Ecija: February 9, 1848
- Barangays: 23 (see Barangays)

Government
  - Type: Sangguniang Bayan
  - Mayor: Rav Kevin M. Rivera
  - Vice Mayor: Ramil B. Rivera
  - Representative: Emerson D. Pascual
  - Municipal Council: Members: Edelwina P. Gonzales; Demetrio M. dela Cruz Jr.; Jose L. Garcia; Moises M. Guevarra; Julito G. Wycoco; Reginald R. Angeles; Jose G. Bustamante Jr.; Jorge A. Burayag
  - Electorate: 62,754 voters (2025)

Area
  - Total: 111.83 km^{2} (43.18 sq mi)
- Elevation: 14 m (46 ft)
- Highest elevation: 31 m (102 ft)
- Lowest elevation: 8 m (26 ft)

Population (2024 census)
  - Total: 89,497
  - Rank: 6th in Nueva Ecija
  - Density: 800.30/km^{2} (2,072.8/sq mi)
  - Households: 19,174
- Demonym(s): Kabyawenyo; Kabyawenya

Economy
  - Income class: 1st municipal income class
  - Poverty incidence: 12.25% (2023)
  - Revenue: ₱ 327.7 million (2024)
  - Assets: ₱ 604.4 million (2024)
  - Expenditure: ₱ 315.3 million (2024)
  - Liabilities: ₱ 320.8 million (2024)

Service provider
  - Electricity: Nueva Ecija 1 Electric Cooperative (NEECO 1)
- Time zone: UTC+8 (PST)
- ZIP code: 3107
- PSGC: 0304904000
- IDD : area code: +63 (0)44
- Native languages: Kapampangan; Tagalog; Ilocano
- Website: www.cabiao.gov.ph

Cabiao, officially the Municipality of Cabiao (Tagalog: Bayan ng Cabiao, Kapampangan: Balen ning Cabiao), is a municipality in the province of Nueva Ecija, Philippines. According to the 2024 census, it has a population of 89,497 people. Cabiao is the 3rd most populous, one of the richest, and fastest growing municipality in the province, only behind Talavera and Guimba. If cities are included, the town ranks 6th.

According to the National Competitiveness Council in Cities/Municipalities Competitiveness Index 2018, Cabiao is ranked 10th in Overall Municipal category with 1,400 participating municipalities and 30th place in first to second class municipal category. The town also boasts of being 2nd place in the Resiliency category.

The town is part of the so-called "Rice Granary Capital of the Philippines", and is also remarked as the "Sweet Sorghum Capital of Nueva Ecija".

== Government ==
=== Local Government ===
The executive branch of the Municipality of Cabiao is headed by the Municipal Mayor. Throughout the municipality's history, the title and term length of the chief executive have evolved—transitioning from the presidente municipal during the early 20th century to the elected Municipal Mayor under the Local Government Code of 1991. The following list details the individuals who have held the office and their respective terms in service.

=== Former Mayors ===
Name	Year
Hon. Pedro Oreta	1900-1903
Hon. Florencio Miranda	1903-1906
Hon. Jose Crespo	1903-1904
Hon. Juan Orquiza	1909-1912
Hon. Gonzalo de Leon	1917-1923
Hon. Manuel Tecson	1923-1926
Hon. Manuel Crespo	1926-1929
Hon. Jose Lapuz	1934-1937
Hon. Prudencio Ortiz Luis	1938-1940
Hon. Jose Garcia	1940
Hon. Isaias Manalastas	1945-1946
Hon. Mariano Guevarra	1945
Hon. Pablo Aligada	1946-1947
Hon. Fernando Relucio	1947-1952
Hon. Paterno L. Santiano	1950
Hon. Gregorio T. Crespo	1960-1963, 1968-1986
Hon. Antonio Lapuz Sr.	1986-1988
Engr. Ireneo A. Manahan	1989-1998
Hon. Gloria Crespo Congco	1998-2001
Hon. Abundia L. Garcia	2007-2010
Hon. Gloria Crespo Congco	2010-2016
Hon. Ramil B. Rivera	2016-2025

== History ==
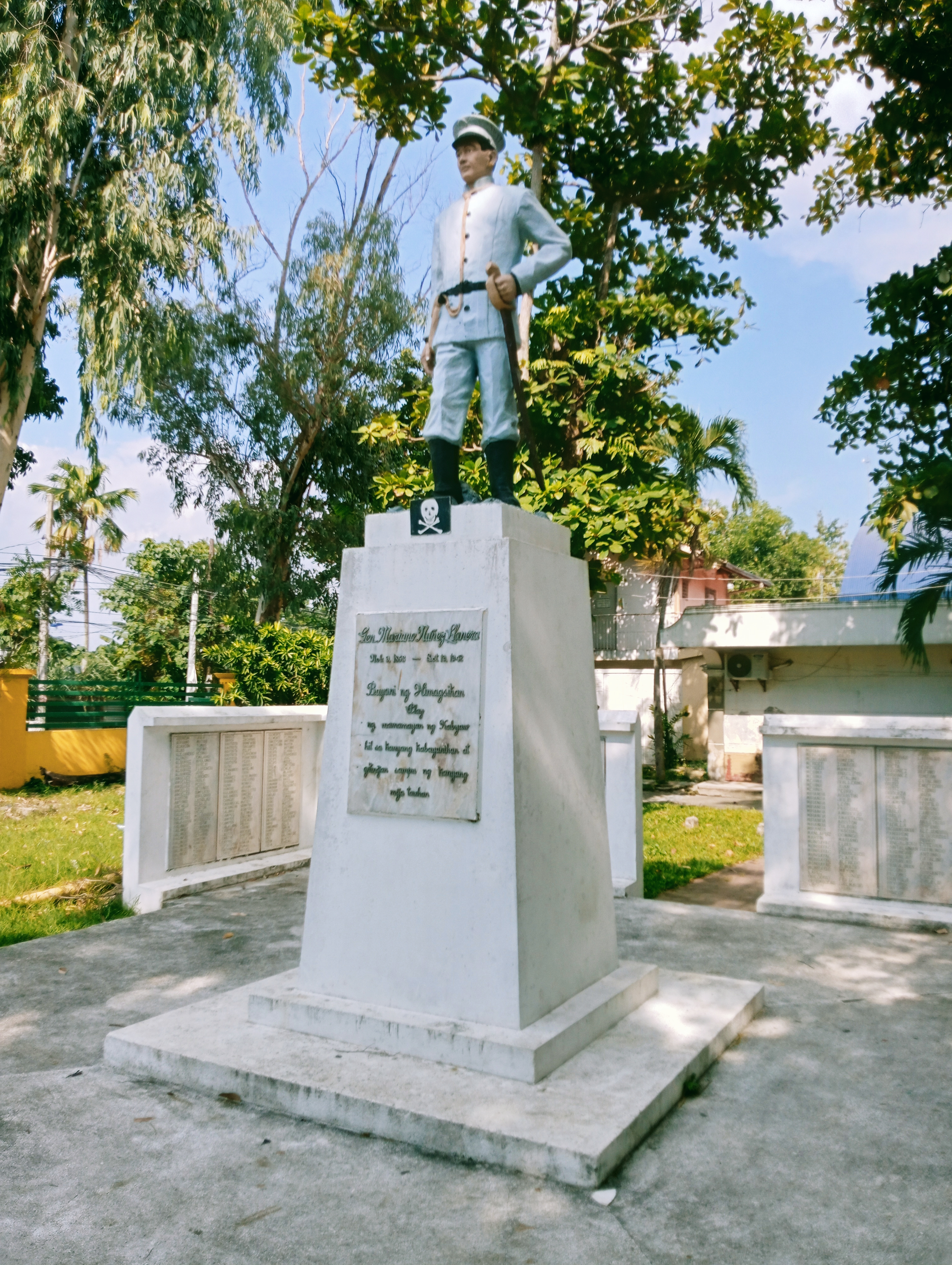
Gen. Mariano Llanera Monument

The name Cabiao is the old Kapampangan word for "a tool used for pounding rice" (modern Kapampangan: kabyo, Tagalog: kabyaw).

Cabiao, along with Gapan, Aliaga, San Isidro, and San Antonio were transferred from Pampanga to Nueva Ecija in 1848. The desire of the populace of Cabiao to be free from Spanish domination and tyranny resulted in an uprising on September 2, 1896. Numbering around 700 men (461 listed in the Tablet of Heroes in the Municipal Compound), the townsfolk of Cabiao and the Cabiao Brass Band under the leadership of their Capitan Municipal Mariano Llanera together with the people of the neighboring towns of Arayat, Delinquente (San Antonio) and Jaen led the siege against the colonizing Spaniards stationed at the Factoria of San Isidro. The Spanish Colonial Government ceded the Philippines to the United States on December 10, 1898, via the Treaty of Paris. Once again, the Philippines was under colonial rule, this time by the American. In the last days of the Spanish occupation, the Cabiao heroes participated in the declaration of the Philippine Republic in Malolos on January 23, 1899. During the Philippine–American War, Cabiao was one of the fiercely contested positions of the American forces in pursuit of General Aguinaldo's Forces however most of the populated areas of Cabiao avoided the fighting. General Pio del Pilar held out in the marshes of San Vicente and Santa Rita to delay the intruding Forces of General Elwell Stephen Otis under the command of General Henry Ware Lawton.

In 1903, the Americans established schools in Cabiao and used the English language as a medium of instructions. Pedro Oreta was elected as the first chief executive of the town under American civil regime followed by the then Mun. President Jose Crespo who established and organized the Presidencia (township hierarchy and organizational plan) constituting the different executive department of the municipality. American occupation in Cabiao has not been as cruel as their Spanish predecessor, however, the people of Cabiao were already afraid to trust the new colonizer. Thomasites missionaries arrived in Cabiao in 1902 as a part of educating the people of Cabiao and in 1903, the Americans established schools in Cabiao and used the English language as the medium of instruction. From 1907 to 1909, Cabiao was placed under jurisdiction of San Isidro and the executive power was then held by the Municipal President of San Isidro. It was in the term of Office of Municipal President Gonzalo Del Leon that the seat of Municipal Town Hall was erected on the land donated by the Romero family. It was during the term of Jose Lapuz that Judge Bonifacio Ysip was elected as delegate to the constitutional convention held in Manila.

After almost three decades of peace, Japan invaded the Philippines. HUKBALAHAP (Hukbo ng Bayan Laban sa Hapon) or People's Anti-Japanese Army, was then established in Sitio Bawit, San Julian, Cabiao on March 29, 1942. When the Allies between the combined U.S. and Filipino troops finally liberated the Philippines and as soon as the Central Government was established in Manila, Mariano Guevarra was appointed Mayor of Cabiao. He was the chief executive of the town in 1945. Prudencio Ortiz Luis succeeded Guevarra who occupies the position for only a few months. In later part of 1945 after the liberation, most of the people of Cabiao were still in the far flung areas of Cambabalu, Saclang Capampangan, Saclang Tagalog, and Dumanas and it was during this time that the mayor of this town has been appointed by then President Manuel Roxas by the name of Ambrosio Aligada. He was appointed as the Chief Executive of the town from 1945 to 1947.

Cabiao was placed under the military government under Pablo Aligada. It was also during the time of Aligada that the Sitio of Palasinan (presently San Gregorio) comprising the property owned by Don Ramon Fernandez were repopulated by the people coming from said the places whereas the area of Bagong Silang were repopulated by the people coming from Buliran, Guyong-guyong, Luyos of which most of them are Tagalogs. Cabiao was governed by Aligada through coercive and dictatorial rule. Isaias Manalastas ruled as the progressive mayor through the support of Huks that during that time is at its height from which they fielded their party named Prente Popular however it did not last long due to the suspicion of the military of an imminent grabbing of power where these party is the political front of the Huks. Nieves Pablo, a woman, was the fourth appointed mayor in that same year. At the height of the Huk uprising, when the entire town was the seat of the rebellion, fifty thousand armed men were inducted in Bawit and in Pasong Diablo, only to be captured en masse by General Ismael Lapus. The clearing of the entire forested area of Bagong Sikat and Santa Isabel was initiated to eliminate the lair of the Huk rebels.

In 1950, when the first tenure of then Paterno Santiano began, the town's public market was constructed through the support of the national government since the towns income cannot at that time support such huge amount of expenditures. During the first tenure of Gregorio T. Crespo, the old town hall was renovated and the original Cabiao Central School Building was restored. The gravelling of Sinipit-San Roque Road was made. Santiano was re-elected as mayor after a heavily contested election results. In 1960, Crespo was re-elected as Mayor, and Pedro T. Wycoco was appointed as the Chief of Police. The Gapan- Arayat Road, Cabiao Section were constructed by Golangco Construction and Development Corp. in 1963. In 1979, the town's Public Market was rehabilitated with the help of assemblyman Angel Concepcion for which the main building was constructed contiguously from the previous two small ones. Cabiao was governed by Crespo for almost three decades.

== Geography ==
Cabiao is located at the south-western part of Nueva Ecija bordering the province of Pampanga. It also borders the municipalities of San Isidro and San Antonio in the province of Nueva Ecija; the municipalities of Magalang, Candaba and Arayat in Pampanga province; and to its north-west is the municipality of Concepcion in Tarlac province. It is 37 kilometres (23 mi) from Cabanatuan, 51 kilometres (32 mi) from Palayan, and 107 kilometres (66 mi) from Manila, and 39 kilometres (24 mi) from San Fernando.

The land area is flat-bounded river with abundant fertile soil; very ideal for cultivation. The estimated 32%, classified as rural/sub-rural areas are related in agricultural land farming. Its surrounded by irrigations and sources of water supply needed in multi-cropping. The rest land area with an estimated of 89.6 km^{2} situated in the core-centered are residentials, households and commercial occupancies. It is classified as urban and sub-urban areas.

=== Climate ===
Climate data for Cabiao, Nueva Ecija
Month	Jan	Feb	Mar	Apr	May	Jun	Jul	Aug	Sep	Oct	Nov	Dec	Year
Mean daily maximum °C (°F)	29 (84)	30 (86)	31 (88)	34 (93)	33 (91)	31 (88)	30 (86)	29 (84)	29 (84)	30 (86)	30 (86)	29 (84)	30 (87)
Mean daily minimum °C (°F)	20 (68)	20 (68)	20 (68)	22 (72)	24 (75)	24 (75)	24 (75)	24 (75)	24 (75)	23 (73)	22 (72)	21 (70)	22 (72)
Average precipitation mm (inches)	4 (0.2)	4 (0.2)	5 (0.2)	11 (0.4)	66 (2.6)	99 (3.9)	127 (5.0)	113 (4.4)	99 (3.9)	84 (3.3)	35 (1.4)	14 (0.6)	661 (26.1)
Average rainy days	2.2	1.9	3.2	5.3	16.1	20.8	23.5	22.8	22.2	16.5	8.9	3.5	146.9
Source: Meteoblue

=== Barangays ===
Cabiao is politically subdivided into 23 barangays. Each barangay consists of puroks and some have sitios.

- Bagong Buhay/ Lote
- Bagong Sikat
- Bagong Silang
- Concepcion/Asyenda
- Entablado
- Maligaya
- Natividad North(pob)
- Natividad South(pob)
- Palasinan
- San Antonio/Pantalan
- San Fernando Norte
- San Fernando Sur
- San Gregorio
- San Juan North(pob)
- San Juan South(pob)
- San Roque
- San Vicente
- Santa Rita
- Sinipit
- Polilio/Libis
- San Carlos
- Santa Isabel
- Santa Ines
- Sitio Dumanas
- Sitio St.Joseph

== Demographics ==
Population census of Cabiao
Year	Pop.	±% p.a.
1903	7,843	—
1918	8,161	+0.27%
1939	14,617	+2.81%
1948	15,902	+0.94%
1960	21,561	+2.57%
1970	28,260	+2.74%
1975	32,752	+3.00%
1980	37,922	+2.97%
1990	48,850	+2.57%
1995	55,902	+2.56%
2000	62,624	+2.46%
2007	68,382	+1.22%
2010	72,081	+1.94%
2015	79,007	+1.76%
2020	85,862	+1.77%
2024	89,497	+1.00%
Source: Philippine Statistics Authority

In the 2024 municipal census, Cabiao had a population of 89,497 people. The population density was 800 inhabitants per square kilometre (2,100/sq mi).

=== Language ===
Kabyawenyos speak Tagalog as their main language. Because the town is a provincial boundary to Pampanga, most of the populace can understand and speak Kapampangan. English is predominantly used in schools and offices, replacing Tagalog as the language spoken.

=== Religion ===
Almost the populace of Cabiao are Roman Catholics, followed by Iglesia Ni Cristo, and protestant sect like born-again Christians, Latter-day Saints, Jehovah's Witnesses, Evangelical fourth watches, Seventh-day Adventists and Baptists are the secondary religious affiliations, sects and organizations.

== Economy ==
Poverty incidence of Cabiao (%)

Source: Philippine Statistics Authority

Growing population and migration provides Cabiao more progressive and sustainable. Increasing the number of commercial business establishment along Jose Abad Santos Avenue, Maligaya Street, Natividad Street, and three neighbor barangays of San Roque, San Gregorio, and San Fernando Sur were located the Public market and Hospital rapidly sprouted.

Cabiao also serve as a commercial, financial and shopping center of neighboring towns of San Isidro, San Antonio and Arayat in Pampanga specifically their nearest barangays of Calaba, San Roque and Sto Cristo in San Isidro.Buliran and Luyos in San Antonio.Mapalad and San Mateo in Arayat.

Urbanization in residential and poblacion areas since 2010–present are observed. From 2nd class municipality rural based in agriculture to 1st class urban municipality.

Eastern and Southern portion engaged in farming and multi-cropping. As part of the "Rice Granary of the Philippines", palay growing are very sustainable and efficient because of good condition of weather, the land area is ideal for cultivation and road connections adjoined from farm to market. Cabiao annually contribute to the provincial rice productions maintain their quantities.

Cabiao's economy is one of the fastest growing in the province of Nueva Ecija and lead as one of the most competitive municipalities in entire Central Luzon region according to the National Competitiveness Council (Philippines) Cities/Municipalities Competitiveness Index 2018. Their revenue income in calendar year 2020 reached P 280,611,660.65 in over 86,968 inhabitants. According to Commission on Audit of the Philippines 2020 data, economic performance of Cabiao are rapidly sustained. Year 2020, 2019, 2018, 2017 and year 2016 shown in the matrix below:

Year	Assets	Liabilities	Equity	Income
2020	₱522,574,173.26	₱299,048,311.11	₱223,525,862.15	₱280,611,660.65
2019	₱451,396,886.98	₱259,324,151.71	₱192,072,735.27	₱223,233,770.08
2018	₱372,568,464.93	₱193,280,360.65	₱179,288,104.28	₱221,613,558.08
2017	₱267,107,549.18	₱138,700,038.84	₱128,407,510.34	₱200,024,292.86
2016	₱212,686,222.79	₱131,995,215.81	₱80,691,006.98	₱160,353,999.25

=== Major industries ===
Rice, corn and sorghum are the main crops for cultivation. Livestocks and contract grower provides inevitable source of income of some Kabyawenyos. Seasonal source of income are mango plantation and calamansi.

== Tourism ==
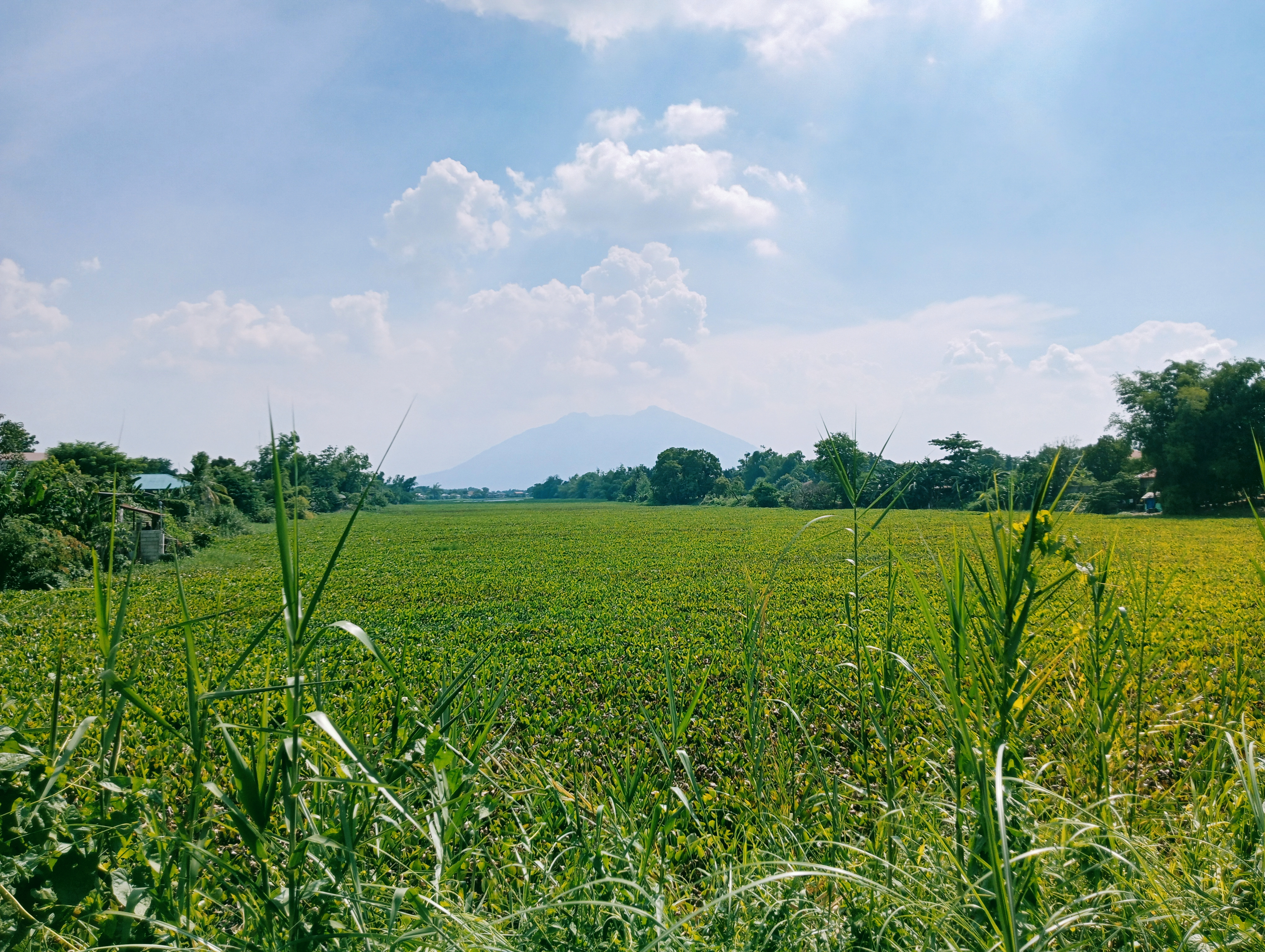
Nabao Lake with Mount Arayat at the background

Nabao Lake, also known as the "Lawa ng Nabao", features views of Mount Arayat from its own nature park. The site is composed of market stalls of handicrafts, rides, a zipline, hanging bridge and restaurants beside the lake. The groundbreaking ceremony was held on September 12, 2018. The place is developed to be pegged as the first floating market-park in the province of Nueva Ecija. The Cabiao Floating Market was opened on December 18, 2020.

"Cabiokid" Foundation is a 13-hectare fermaculture land with over 1000 species of endemic flora are preserved. The land area is composed of rice fields, swamps, mini forest and a garden.

=== Historical site ===
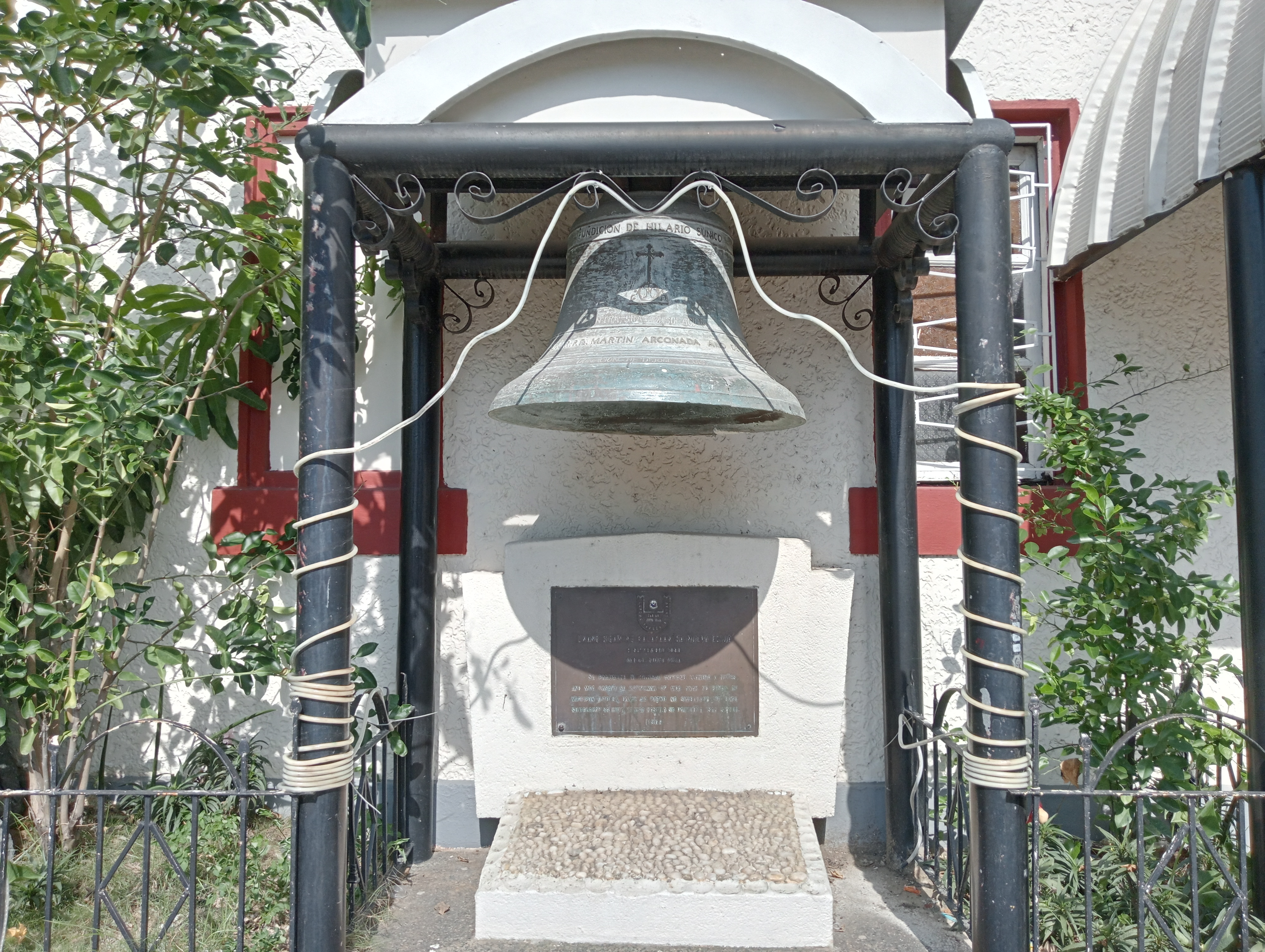
First Cry of Nueva Ecija Marker

Monument of general Mariano Llanera that can be seen in front of Cabiao Municipal Hall symbolizes the heroism of the general who fought the Spaniards and led the "First Cry of Nueva Ecija". The place is also surrounded by bustling Philippine Mahogany trees.

=== Products ===
Sweet delicacies and Pasalubong are the most visited in the town. Pastillas made from fresh carabao's milk are famous of all their products.

== Culture ==
=== Paistima Ka ===
Paistima Ka sa Kabyawan Festival, a week-long festivity every first/second week of February. The festival commemorates the founding anniversary of the town that showcases the rich culture and display the wide array of local delicacies.

The acronym "PaIsTiMa Ka" is from: Pa (Palay), Is (Isda), Ti (Tinapay), Ma (Mangga), and Ka (Ikaw).

=== Kabyawan Festival ===
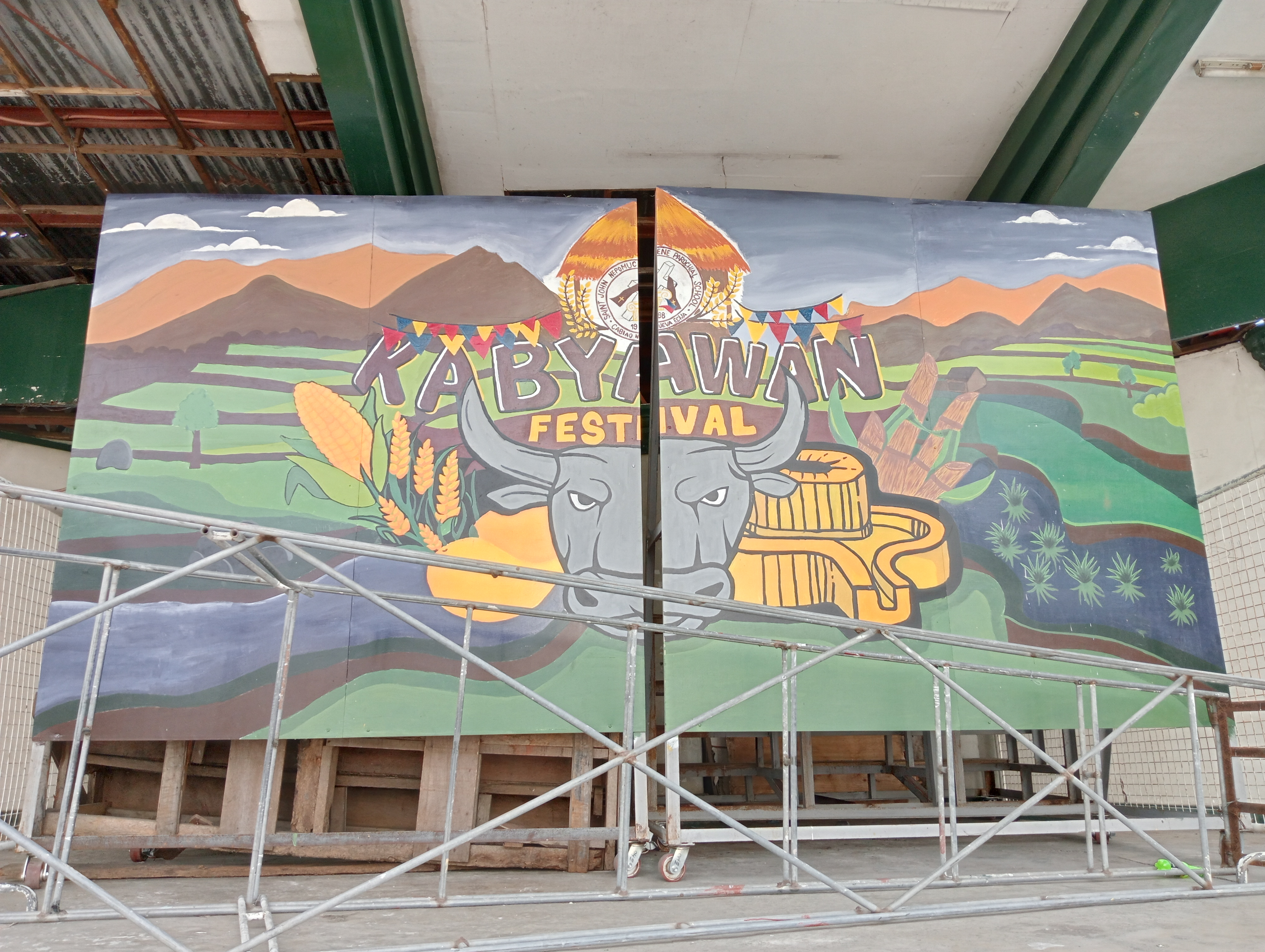
Kabyawan Festival Poster

Kabyawan Festival annually celebrated to the feast of patron's town proper Saint John Nepomocene starting May 8–16. Kabyawan is derived from grinding tools used in extracting sugarcane. The festival showcases local products and delicacies.

The first day includes a Holy Mass in the cathedral. Festivities include a fun-run, bike-a-thon, street dancing, mass demonstration, cultural dancing, dart and poster making. A talent competition and Mayflower parade, followed by the Coronation night of Mutya ng Cabiao is the high point. A grand parade proceeds along Jose Abad Santos Avenue.

== Infrastructure ==
=== Transportation ===
Cabiao is about an hour and a half drive with 92 kilometre away from Manila. It can be reached via NLEX, taking San Simon exit and turning right at Santo Domingo junction in Mexico, traversing Santa Ana, and Arayat in Pampanga. The other route from Manila is taking Santa Rita exit and traversing Maharlika Road through Bulacan province to Gapan, Nueva Ecija turning left towards San Isidro. From Cabanatuan, Cabiao can be reached via Gapan or partly through the Cabiao Viaduct from Jaen town. There are also routes from Clark International Airport via Magalang traversing left to Arayat Pampanga via Jose Abad Santos Avenue (Olongapo-Gapan road).

==== Penaranda-Gapan-San-Isidro-Cabiao Bypass Road ====
The town of Cabiao can be accessed through the 22-kilometer bypass road that also links other towns of Nueva Ecija, such as Peñaranda, Gapan, and San Isidro. This road currently terminates in Brgy. Sta Ines, Cabiao.

==== Public Transportation ====
Cabiao transportation is likely available in all services. The First North Luzon Transit (formerly Sierra Madre Transit.) and RJ Express Inc. are regular travel bus companies with route from Caloocan to San Isidro and vice versa via North Luzon Expressway taking San Simon exit. The regional bus company Genesis Transport, Saulog Transit, and Arayat Express also has a regular route from Olongapo - San Jose City / Cabanatuan vice versa along Jose Abad Santos Avenue (Olongapo-San Fernando-Gapan Road) R3 traversing the town. Passenger jeepneys with the regular route from Cabanatuan - Cabiao via Gapan and vice versa and Cabiao - Arayat / Cabiao - San Fernando, Pampanga via Arayat and vice versa are the common public transport services. Passenger tricycles spreadout point to point around the town has a terminal sections along the streets and market centers.

=== Telecommunications ===
PLDT, Datelcom and Digitel Mobile Philippines, Inc. are the longest telecommunication company in town. Smart Communications, Talk 'N Text and Sun Cellular provide high speed signals LTE in town. Dito Telecommunity, Globe Telecom and Touch mobile upgrade their signals as LTE as part of the area site covered.

Cabiao is part of the contagious Mega Manila as far as Cabanatuan so that several radio stations and television signals are covered.

== Education ==
The Cabiao Schools District Office governs all educational institutions within the municipality. It oversees the management and operations of all private and public, from primary to secondary schools.

Education in Cabiao is concentrated in the downtown area. Primary and secondary together with the colleges and universities are also seen in suburban barangays. These are the list of schools in Cabiao:

=== Primary and elementary schools ===
- Advent School Foundation
- Bagong Sikat Elementary School
- Bagong Silang Elementary School
- Cabiao Central School
- Concepcion Elementary School
- Entablado Elementary School
- Enrique Rivera Jr. Elementary School
- God's Speed Foundation
- Jose Rico Cruz Elementary School
- Legacy Accelerated Christian Academy
- Little Child Jesus Christian Academy
- Maligaya Elementary School
- Palasinan Elementary School
- Polilio Elementary School
- Saint John Nepomocene Parochial School
- Saint Josef Elementary School
- San Antonio Bagong Buhay Elementary School
- San Carlos Elementary School
- San Fernando Norte Elementary School
- San Fernando Sur Elementary School
- San Gregorio Elementary School
- San Roque Elementary School
- San Vicente Elementary School
- Santa Isabel Elementary School
- Santa Rita Elementary School
- Seventh-day Adventist Elementary School
- Sinipit Elementary School

=== Secondary Schools ===
- Blessed Children Integrated School
- Cabiao Senior High School
- Cabiao National High School
- General Mariano Llanera High School
- Gregorio T. Crespo Memorial High School
- Manuel V. Gallego High School
- Santa Rita National High School
- Saint John Nepomocene Parochial School
- Saint Josef National High School

=== Higher educational institutions ===
- Cabiao Technological College
- First Asean International Systems College
- Polytechnic University of the Philippines
- Resource World College

== Notable people ==
- Mark Jimenez – former Manila congressman and consultant of former Philippine President Joseph Ejercito Estrada
- Sergio Ortiz-Luis Jr. – Chairman Emeritus of PCCI
- Reynaldo Wycoco – former NBI director

== Sister cities ==
- Gapan, Nueva Ecija

== Gallery ==
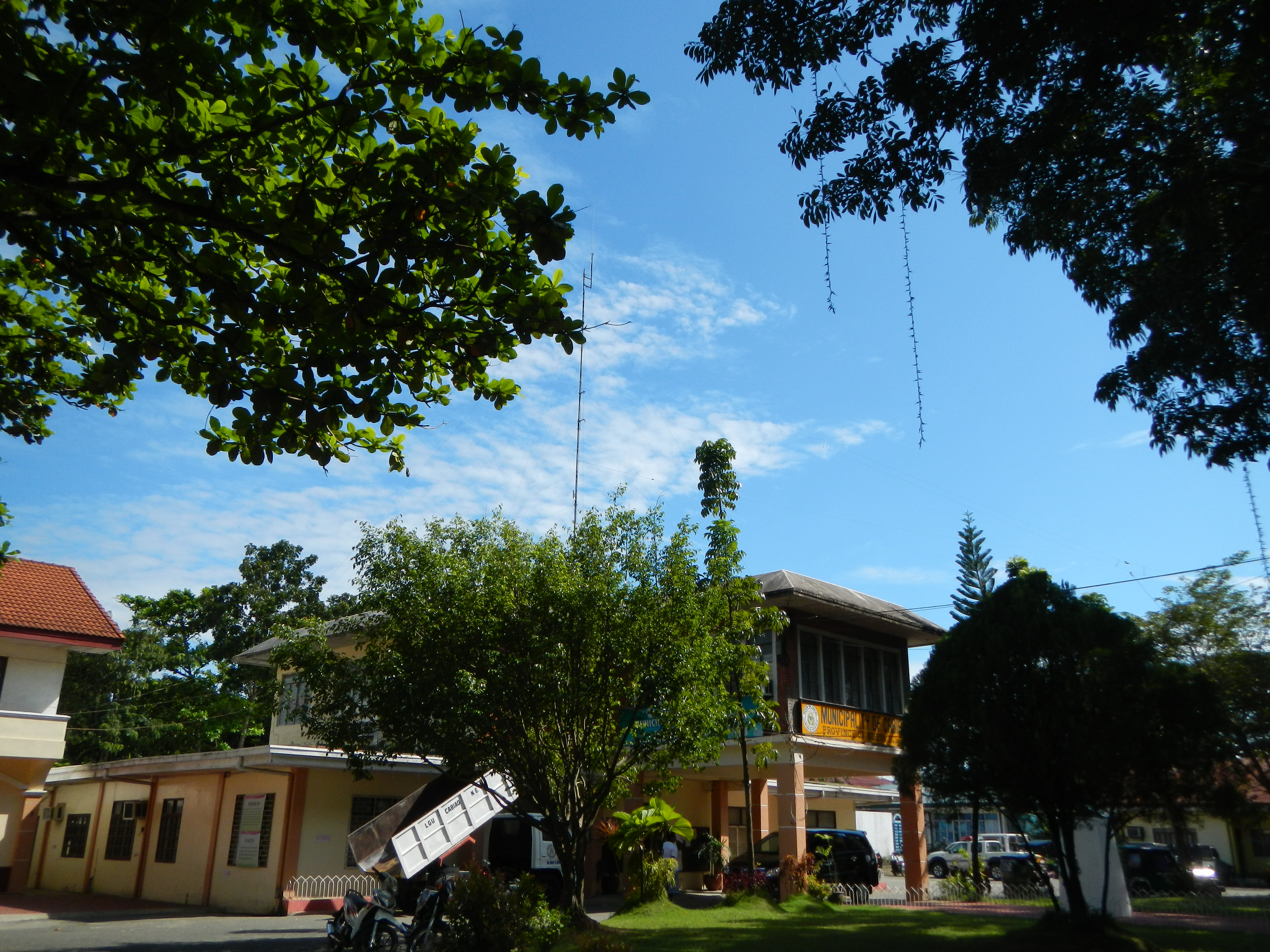
Municipal offices

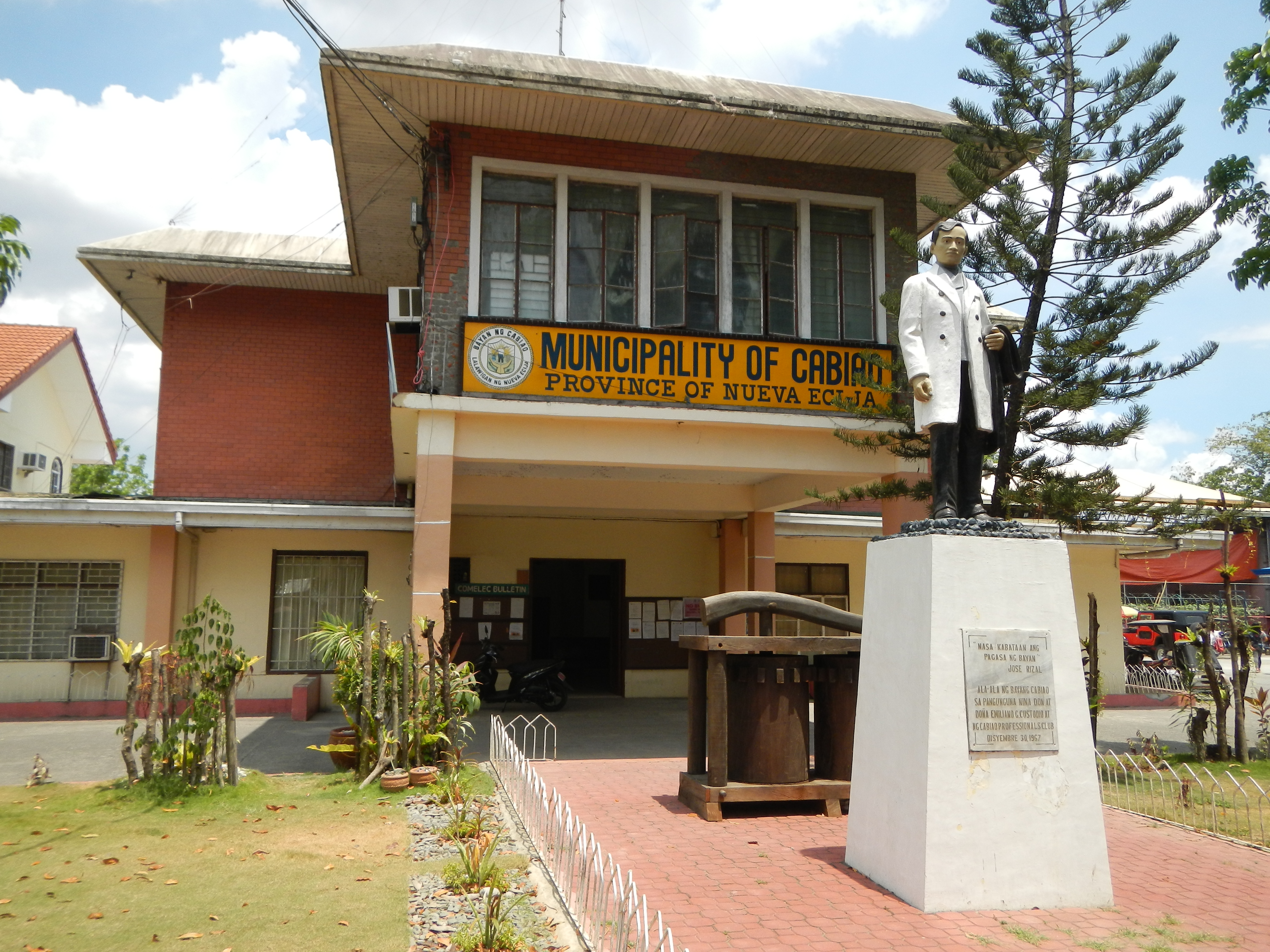
Old Cabiao Town Hall, seat of Municipal Government

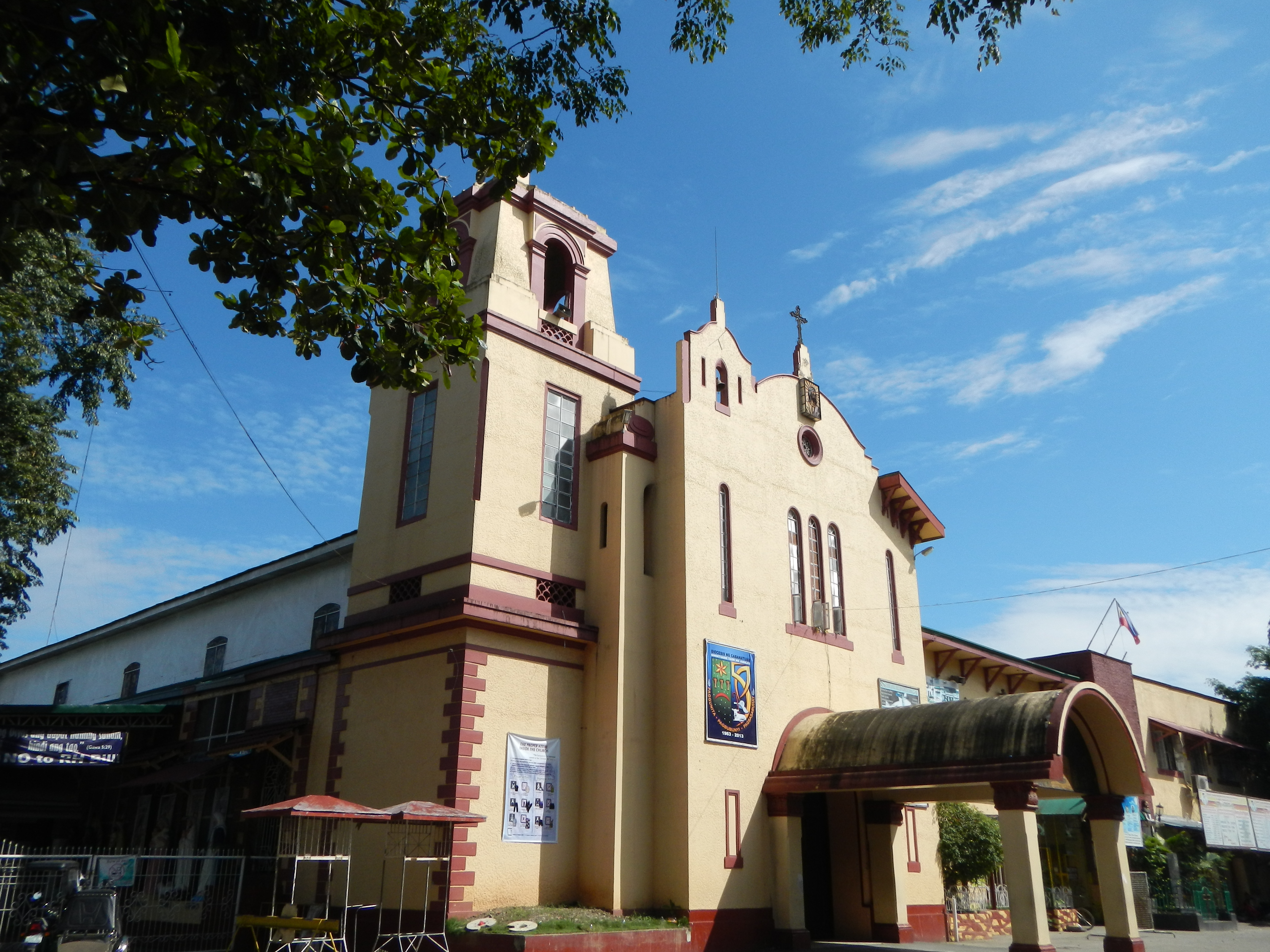
Saint John Nepomucene Parochial School facade

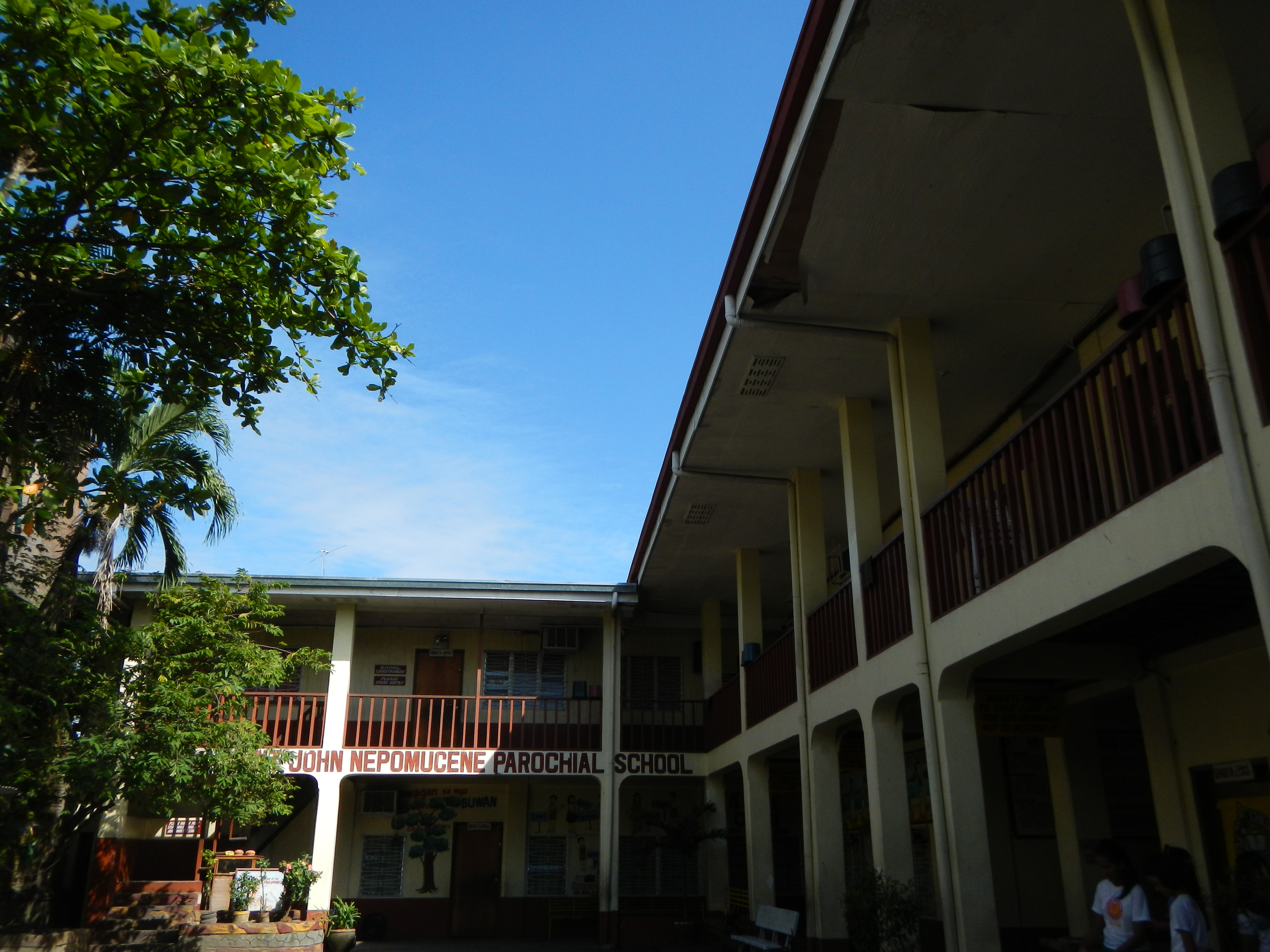
Saint John Nepomucene Parochial School exterior

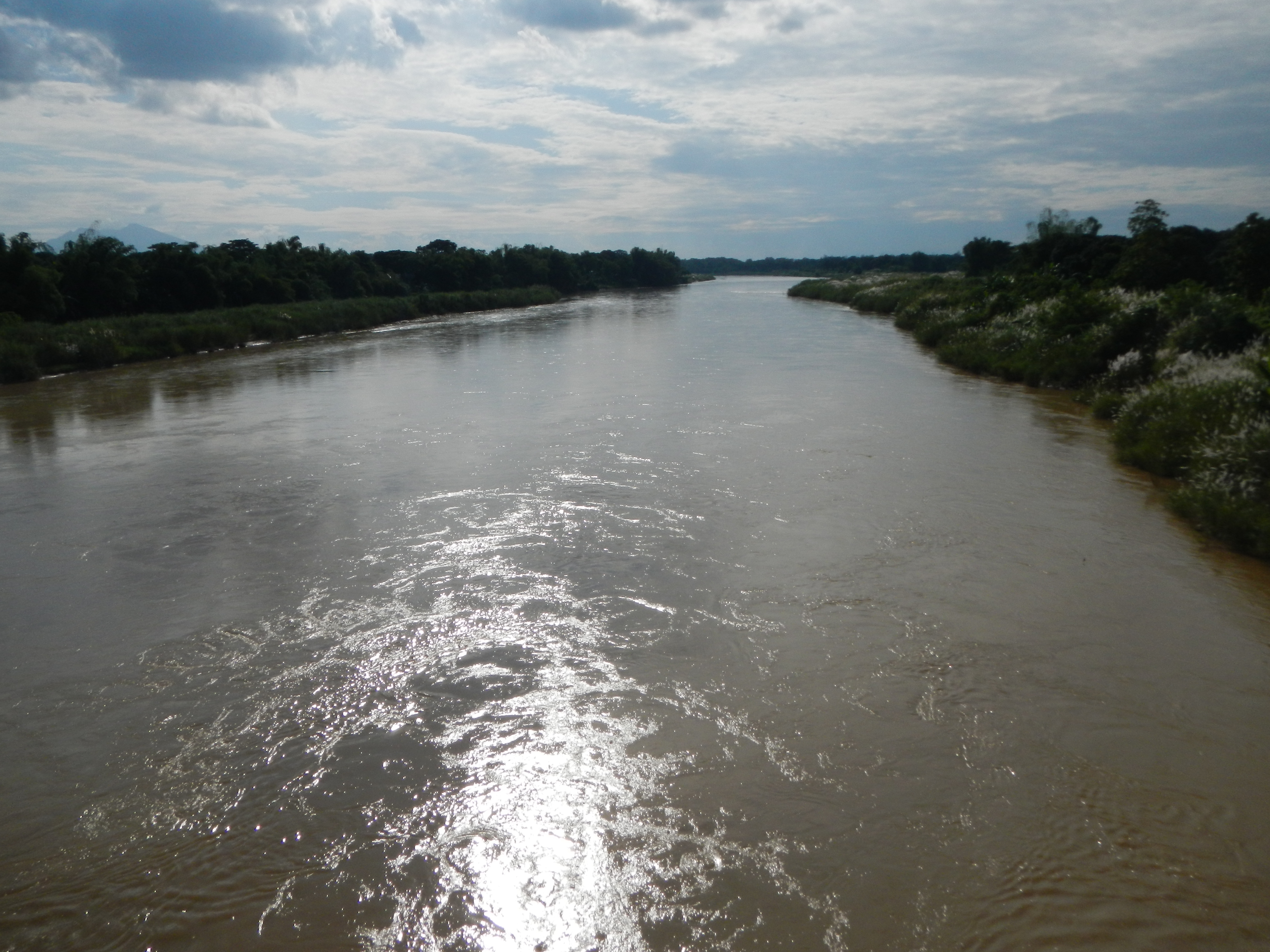
View of Pampanga River from Sta. Isabel Bridge

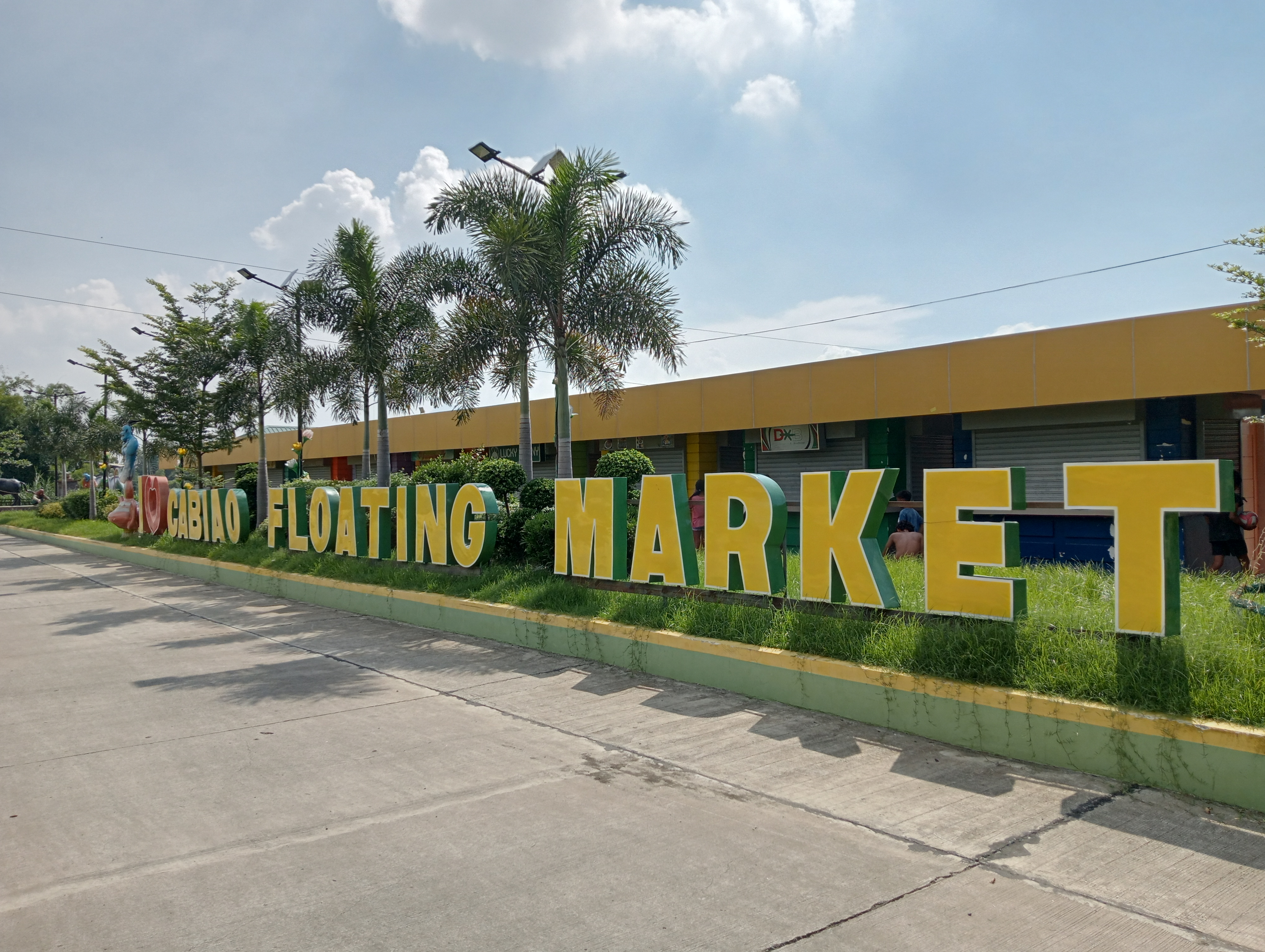
Cabiao Floating Market
