= 1957 Palanca Awards =

Philippine literary award

7th Palanca Memorial Awards

The 7th Carlos Palanca Memorial Awards for Literature was held to commemorate the memory of Carlos T. Palanca, Sr. through an endeavor that would promote education and culture in the country.

== English Division ==
=== Short Story ===
- First Prize: Juan C. Tuvera, "High Into Morning"
- Second Prize: Rony V. Diaz, "The Treasures"
- Third Prize: Gilda Cordero Fernando, "Sunburn"

=== One-Act Play ===
- First Prize: Jesus T. Peralta, "Play the Judas"
- Second Prize: Alberto S. Florentino Jr., "The Dancers"
- Third Prize: Isabel Taylor Escoda, "The Efficiency Expert"

== Filipino Division ==
=== Maikling Kwento ===
- First Prize: Pedro S. Dandan, "Sugat ng Digma"
- Second Prize: Buenaventura S. Medina Jr., "Punong-kahoy"
- Third Prize: Eduardo B. Reyes, "Pag-uugat ... Pagsusupling"

=== Dulang May Isang Yugto ===
- Consolation Prizes:

Deogracias Tigno Jr., "Aling Poling"
Fernando L. Samonte, "Baril at Kaligtasan"
Alejandro G. Abadilla and Elpidio P. Kapulong, "Daloy ng Buhay"
Pablo M. Cuasay, "Kamay na Bakal"
Emmanuel H. Borlaza, "May Pangako ang Bukas"

== Sources ==
- "The Don Carlos Palanca Memorial Awards for Literature | Winners 1957". Archived from the original on 2009-10-22.
