= Ron Dias (disambiguation) =

Ron Dias may refer to:

- Ron Dias (1937–2013), American animator and painter
- Ron Dias (director), Canadian filmmaker

== See also ==
- Ron Diaz (born c. 1955), American radio talk show host
- Rony Diaz, Filipino writer
