= Nabao Lake =

Eco-tourism site in Cabiao, Nueva Ecija

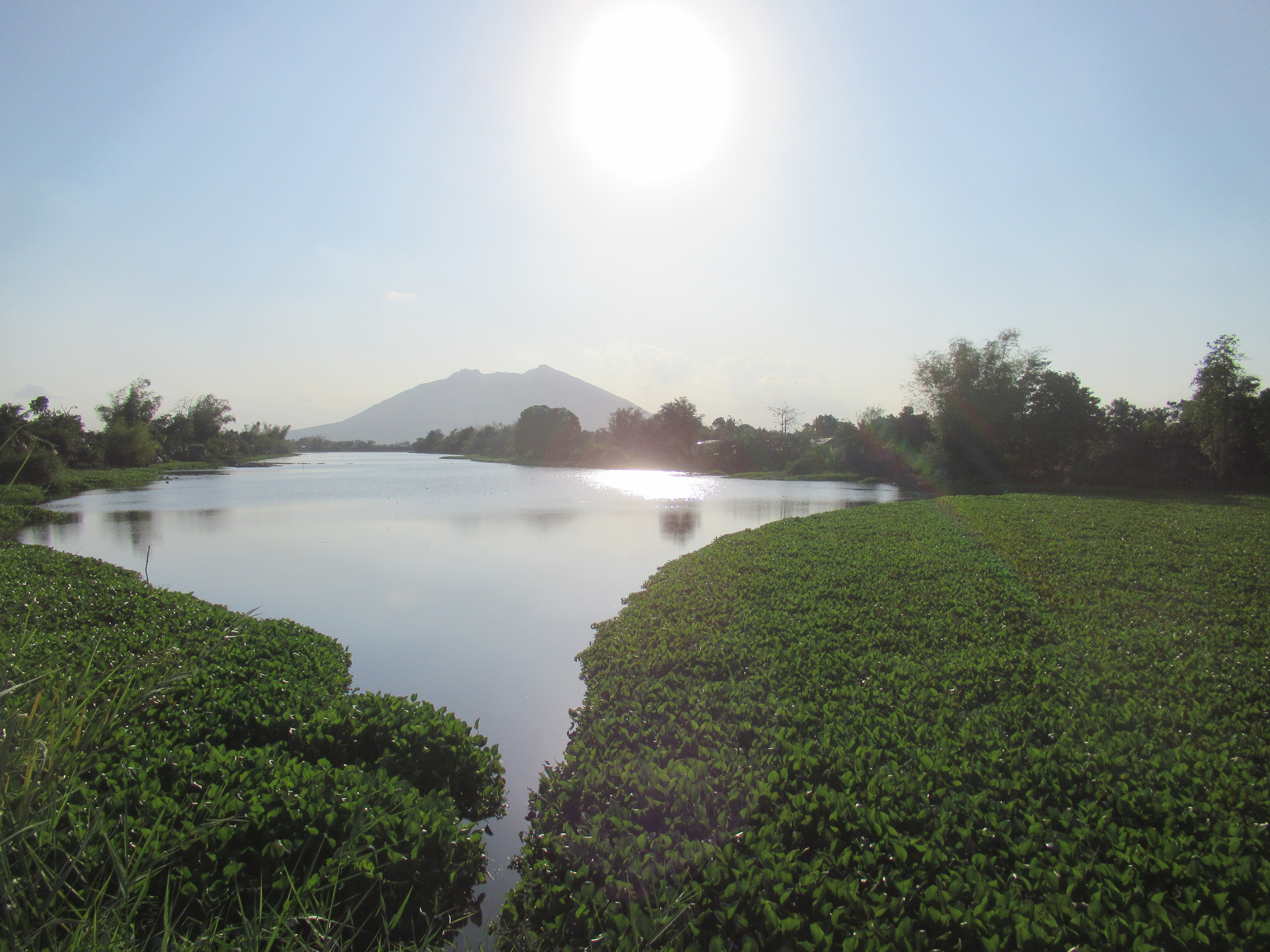
- The lake with Mount Arayat in the background

- Location in Nueva Ecija Location in Luzon Location in the Philippines
- Location: Cabiao, Nueva Ecija
- Coordinates: 15°14′10″N 120°50′37″E
- Basin countries: Philippines
- Max. length: 1.42 km (0.88 mi) (N-S)
- Max. width: 1.83 km (1.14 mi) (E-W)
- Surface area: 38-hectare (94-acre)

Nabao Lake (Filipino: Lawa ng Nabao) is a 38-hectare (94-acre) oxbow lake and ecotourism site located in Barangay Santa Rita in the municipality of Cabiao, Nueva Ecija, Philippines, along Jose Abad Santos Avenue.

The lake is located near Mount Arayat, which lies within a nature park. A 210-meter portion of the lake area is occupied by several restaurants, food and handicraft stalls, souvenir shops, guest rooms, a zipline, and a hanging bridge at the center of the lake. It was formerly an active fishing site.

The lake was once part of the Pampanga River until a flood-control dike separated it, isolating it and forming an oxbow lake shaped like an inverted "C". The ₱105-million project initiated under Mayor Ramil B. Rivera features, among others, a view deck, gazebo, and a batalan sa lawa. The lake is home to fauna such as the Bighead carp (Hypophthalmichthys nobilis), locally known as the "Imelda fish", the Asian swamp eel, tilapia, and mudfish. The lake's ₱20-million Eco-Tourism Park became the focal point of the Paistimika Festival, highlighting the town's 167th foundation anniversary.

The groundbreaking ceremony was held on September 12, 2018, and its inauguration took place on December 18, 2020. The site is promoted as the first floating market park in the province of Nueva Ecija.

The lake is categorized as hypereutrophic (TSI 60–100), indicating very high biological productivity and poor water quality based on low Secchi disk visibility readings. It is classified as suitable for Class B (recreational) and Class C (propagation of fish and other aquatic resources) uses. The lake is also the subject of wetland conservation and community development initiatives by the Society for the Conservation of Philippine Wetlands, Inc.

== Gallery ==
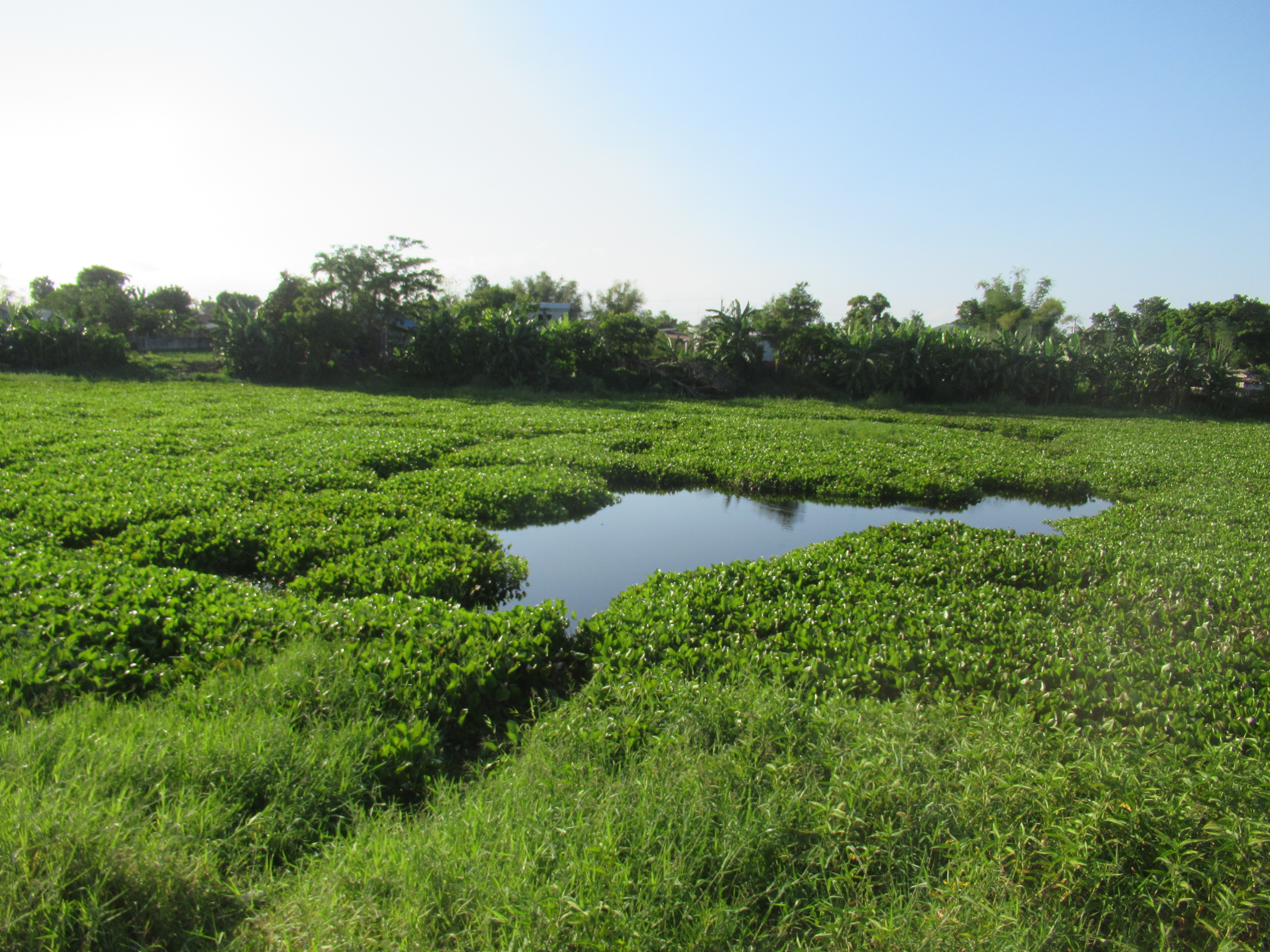
Water lilies at the lake

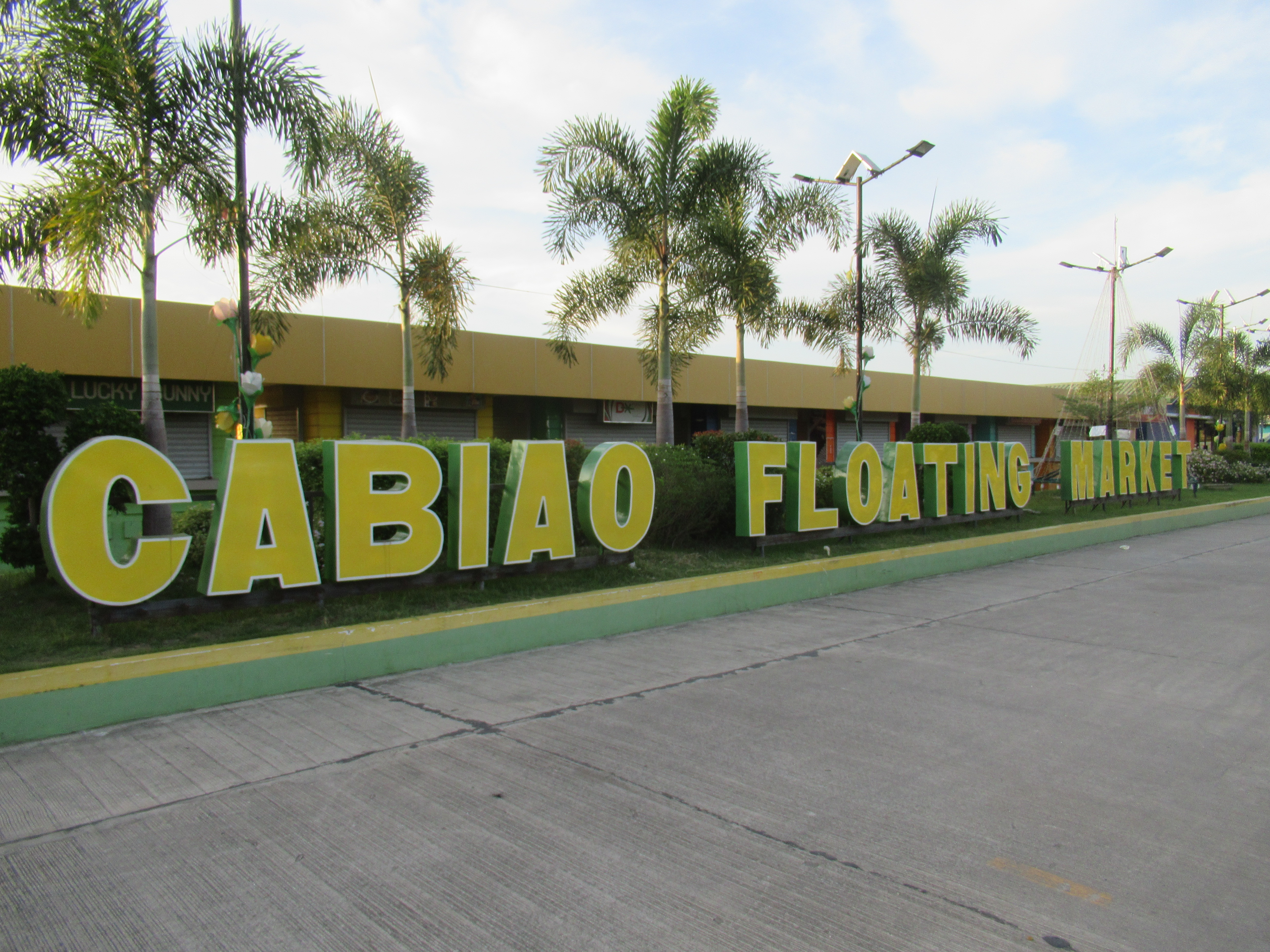
Floating market welcome sign

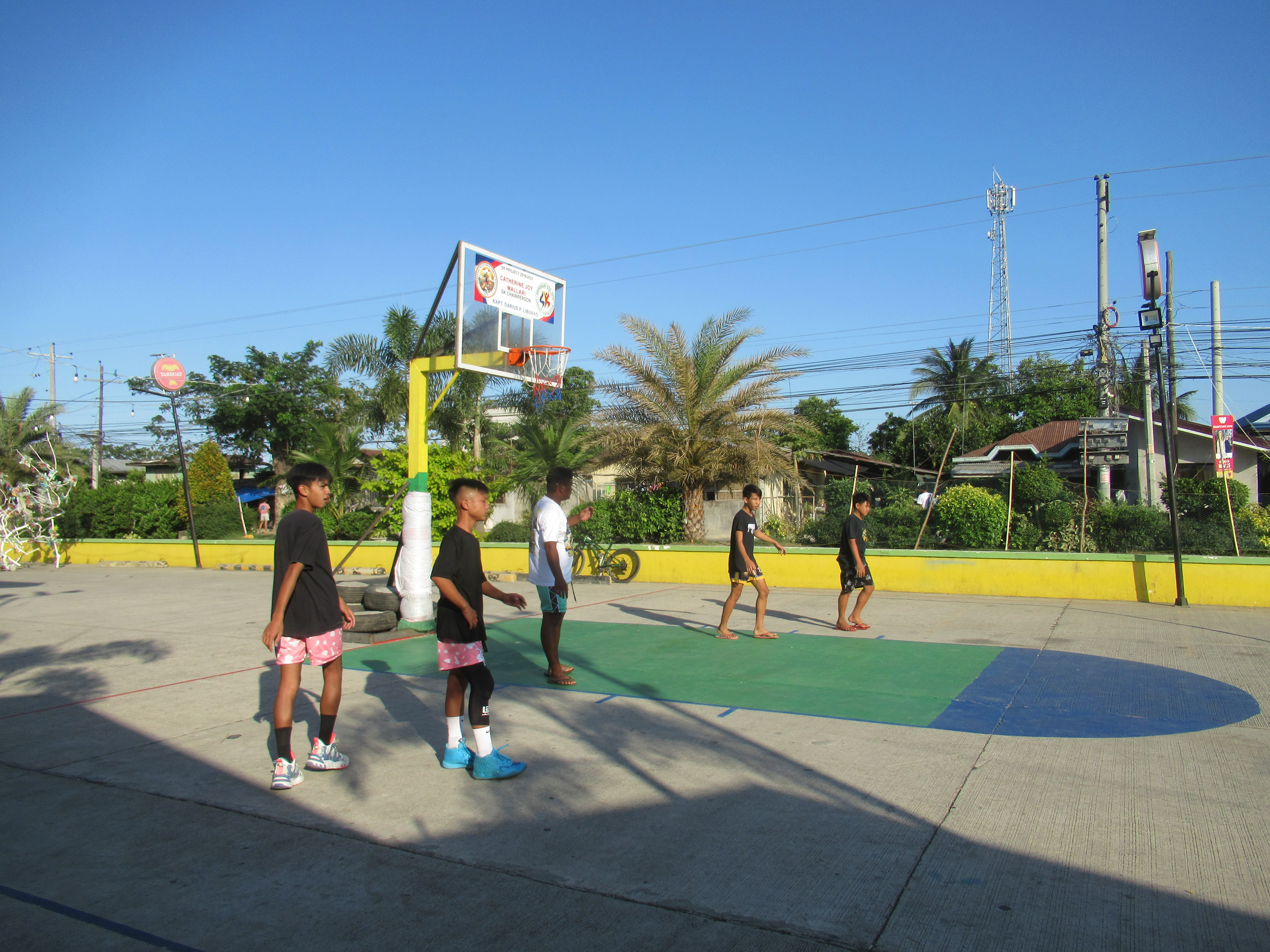
Eco-Tourism Park

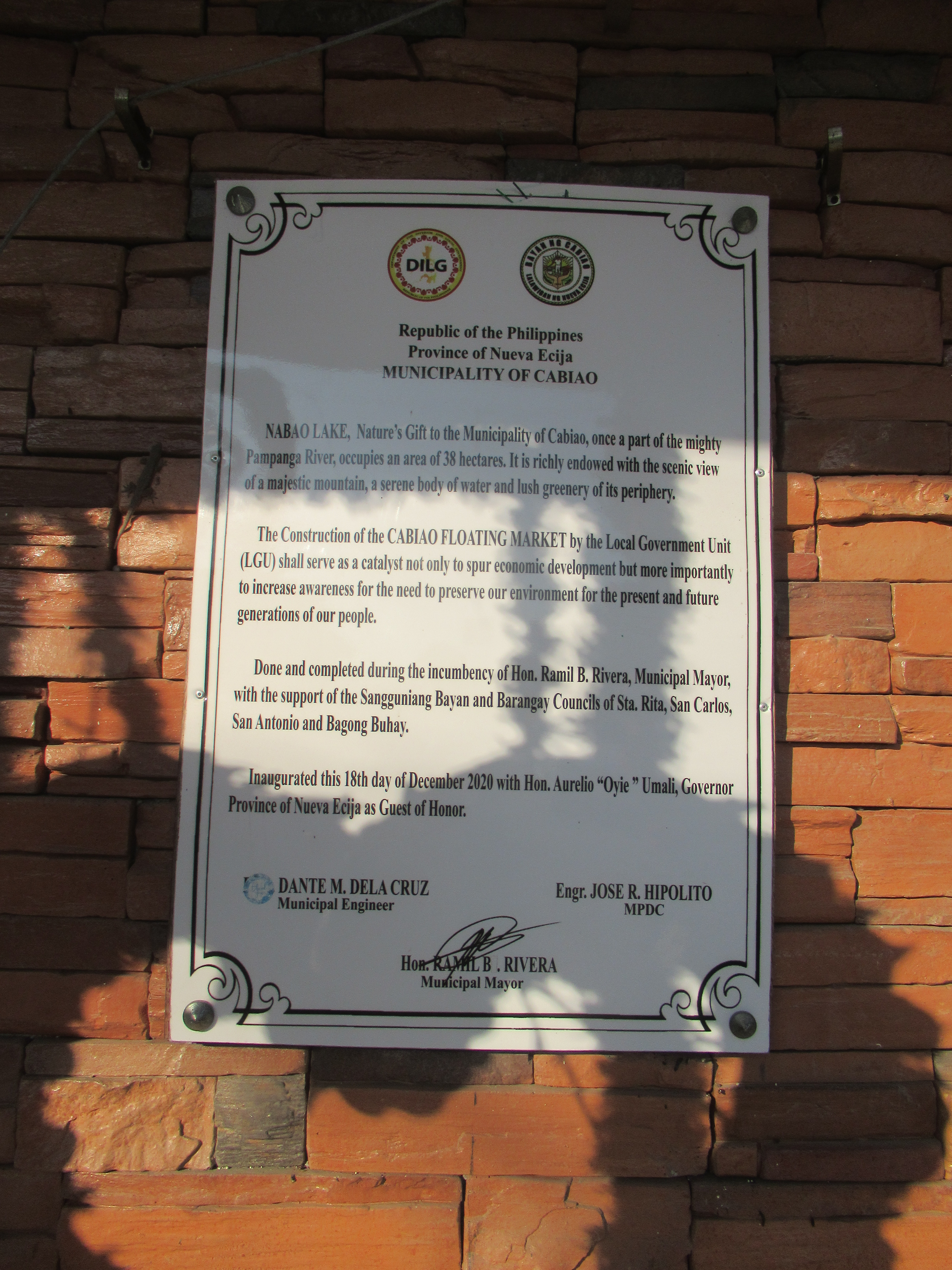
Historical marker

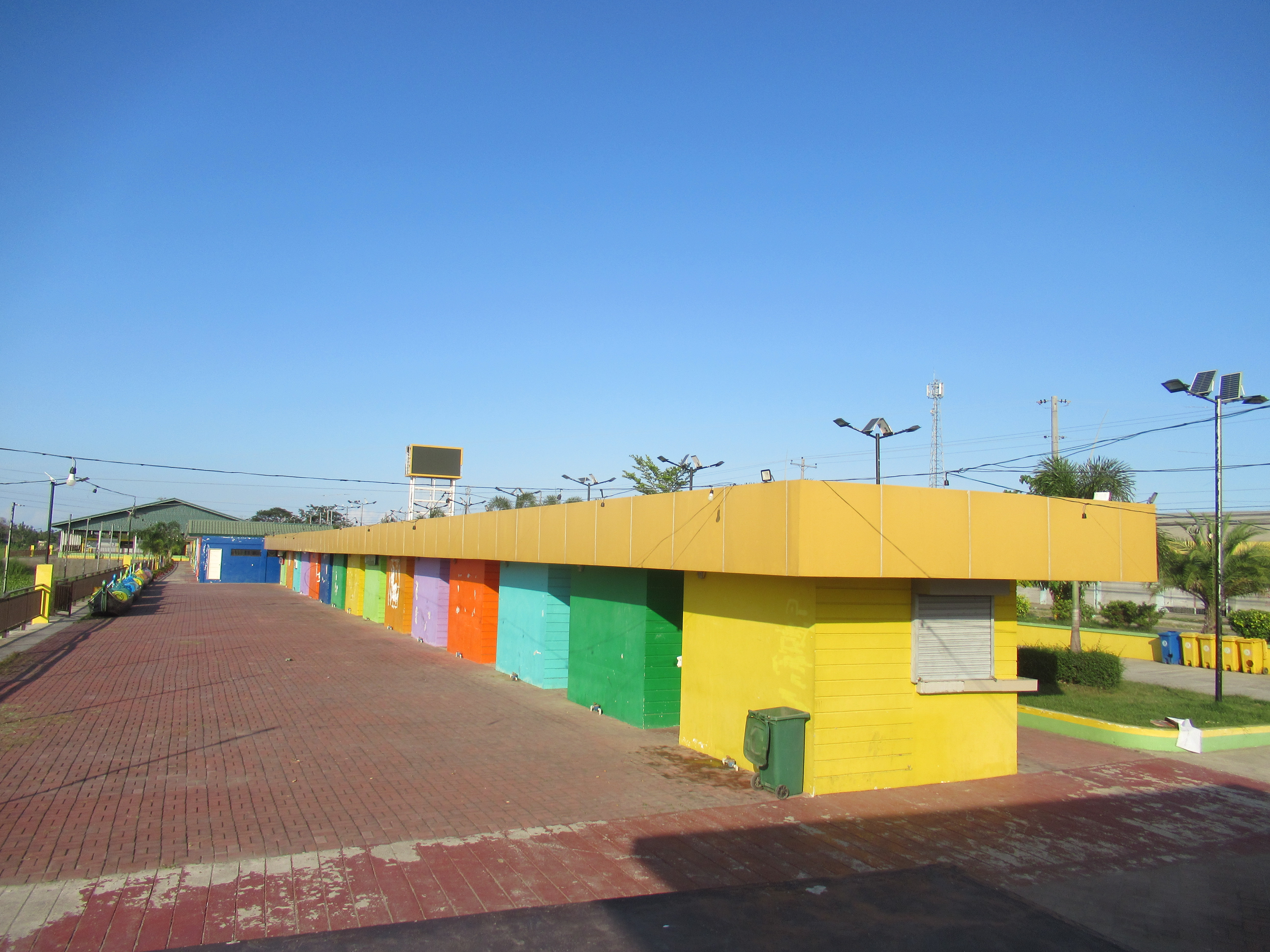
Floating market shops

== Sources ==
- Domingo, Ferdie G. (January 10, 2017). "Cabiao plans to turn Nabao Lake into tourist hub". Manila Standard.
