= Mark Jimenez =

Filipino businessman and politician

Member of the Philippine House of Representatives from Manila's 6th District
- In office June 30, 2001 – March 6, 2003
- Preceded by: Sandy Ocampo
- Succeeded by: Benny Abante

Personal details
- Born: Mario Crespo; December 31, 1946 Cabiao, Nueva Ecija, Philippines
- Died: April 25, 2017 (aged 70) Manila, Philippines
- Occupation: Businessman, politician

Mario Crespo, professionally and widely known as Mark Jimenez (December 31, 1946 – April 25, 2017), was a Filipino businessman, corporate executive, and politician who served as a Member of the House of Representatives representing Manila's 6th District from 2001 until his disqualification in 2003. He was a prominent figure during the administration of President Joseph Estrada, serving as a close advisor and presidential consultant.

== Early life and career ==
Jimenez was born Mario Crespo in Cabiao, Nueva Ecija. He eventually relocated to the United States and built a career as a successful businessman and corporate executive, particularly in the technology sector, where he established computer distribution networks in Latin America and the United States. During his business ventures, he adopted the name Mark Jimenez.

== Involvement in the Estrada Administration ==
Jimenez returned to the Philippines and became heavily involved in the political circle of Joseph Estrada during his presidential campaign and subsequent victory in 1998. Estrada dubbed Jimenez a "corporate genius" for his business acumen and financial strategies. He served as Estrada's presidential consultant on Latin American affairs and played an influential role behind the scenes in major corporate acquisitions and state decisions during the administration.

== Congressional term and legal controversies ==
In 2001, Jimenez ran and won as an independent candidate representing Manila's 6th congressional district in the House of Representatives of the Philippines. However, his political career faced intense legal challenges due to an impending extradition request from the United States government.

=== United States criminal case and extradition ===
Jimenez faced criminal charges in the United States related to illegal campaign contributions to the U.S. Democratic Party, wire fraud, mail fraud, and tax evasion. The United States government filed an extradition treaty request, which culminated in a landmark legal battle reaching the Supreme Court of the Philippines. In December 2002, Jimenez surrendered to Philippine authorities and agreed to be extradited to the United States to face trial.

Following his departure, the House of Representatives Electoral Tribunal (HRET) unseated Jimenez from his congressional post on March 6, 2003, citing eligibility issues and a failure to maintain residency requirements.

=== Incarceration ===
In the United States, Jimenez entered a plea bargain and pleaded guilty to charges of tax evasion and conspiracy to commit fraud. He was sentenced to 27 months in federal prison. He served his sentence at the Federal Correctional Institution in Miami, Florida, before being released and returning to the Philippines in 2005.

== Death ==
Jimenez died on April 25, 2017, at the age of 70 following a stroke. His family announced his passing, and his wake was held at the Heritage Memorial Park in Taguig.
