= Silingan Coffee =

Coffeehouse in Quezon City, Philippines

- Interactive map of Silingan Coffee

Restaurant information
- Established: 2021
- Owner: Ciriaco Santiago III
- Food type: coffee and pastries
- Location: Quezon City, Philippines
- Coordinates: 14°37′20.322″N 121°3′23.768″E
- Other locations: Manila; Parañaque

Silingan Coffee is a coffeehouse in Cubao, Quezon City, set up in 2021 during the COVID-19 pandemic by a Redemptorist Brother to provide jobs to the families of victims of the alleged extrajudicial killings (EJKs) in the Philippine war on drugs. To put up the cafe, Ciriaco "Jun" Santiago III, the Redemptorist Brother who is also a photojournalist, sought the help of Respond and Break the Silence Against the Killings (RESBAK), an alliance of artists and journalists opposing Rodrigo Duterte's war on drugs and other human rights abuses in the Philippines, who provided Santiago the space for the cafe.

The cafe also serves as a venue for the victims to tell their stories to customers, thus keeping their narrative about the drug war alive. According to Santiago, the coffeehouse's business goes beyond profit-making; it also aims to continue to share the narratives of the EJKs' victims, acting as a venue for those who have been silenced. "Some (of the coffeehouse staff's cases) are known cases whose stories are followed by other media entities," he stated, "while some are unknown, (with the involved crew members having) no idea how to pursue their case."

== History ==
Before putting up Silingan, Santiago already had an earlier coffeehouse-for-a-cause housed beneath Baclaran Church's bell tower. Named Sinirangan (from the Waray word, lit. 'East'), the coffeehouse's sales proceeds were donated to struggling survivors of Super Typhoon Yolanda. Santiago took in staffers without prior coffee experience, whom he taught the art of roasting beans and doing latte art at the cafe.

When the pandemic arrived, Sinirangan failed to survive the lockdowns and closed in May 2021. Santiago turned to delivering food packs to underserved communities, wherein he witnessed the dire need for support expressed by families affected by the EJKs whose stories received resistance from Duterte's fearmongering and populist campaign as well as defeats in court. This led Santiago to start delivering food packs, vegetables, and whatever else to the mothers of EJK victims within the Greater Manila Area and Quezon province and to form the idea for continuing his coffeehouse social enterprise, this time for a different cause.

He named his new coffeehouse project Silingan, which is Cebuano for "neighbor", and opened its door in October 2021 at Stall #9 in Cubao Expo, an enclave in Cubao, Quezon City frequented by hipsters. The name is supposed to appeal to "neighbors" who have refused to testify or talk to journalists.

According to Santiago, the coffeehouse's staff "are victims whose cases happened before Duterte withdrew [the Philippines] from the ICC (International Criminal Court) in March 19, 2018."

=== Small expansion ===
In 2023, the coffeehouse converted an old Chevrolet SUV into a mobile kitchen that is now on the grounds of the Redemptorist Church in Parañaque. Within the same year, the brand had in its roster of employees 28 baristas as well as 30 candlemakers.

The brand also later opened a stall at De La Salle University's Yuchengco Lobby, which in 2025 offered its coffee at half the usual price after the arrest of Rodrigo Duterte. The brand's Facebook page also announced the same promo for its main branch.

== Appearance ==
The coffeehouse's walls sport a collage of the past years under Duterte, as well as anti-Duterte slogans and calls for justice, posters belonging to their regulars, event posters on the war on drugs, and clippings of the coffeehouse's media coverage.

== Personnel and menu ==
All of the coffeehouse's staff are mothers, wives, sisters, and daughters of victims of the Philippine drug war's alleged EJKs.

Santiago only supplies the coffeeshop its dark coffee; the pastries that include cupcakes, cookies, and breads, as well as the processed meats also sold at the shop, are all goods home-made by the shop's personnel themselves.
