= National Competitiveness Council (Philippines) =

Filipino think tank

- Seal
- Abbreviation: NCC
- Formation: October 5, 2006
- Location: Makati, Philippines
- Chairperson: Ramon M. Lopez, DTI
- Co-Chairperson: Guillermo Luz (MBC, AC)
- Website: competitive.org.ph

The National Competitiveness Council (NCC) is a public-private body that develops strategy for the long-term competitiveness of the Philippines through policy reforms, project implementation, institution building, and performance monitoring.

Its mission is to build up the long-term competitiveness of the country through policy reforms, implementation of strategic projects, institution building, and performance monitoring.

== Composition ==
- Secretary of the Department of Trade and Industry as chairperson
- Private sector representative as co-chairperson
- Secretary of the Department of Finance as member
- Secretary of the Department of Energy as member
- Secretary of the Department of Tourism as member
- Secretary of the Department of Education as member
- Director General if the National Economic and Development Authority as member
- Five Private Sector Representatives as member
- Secretariat

The private sector co-chairperson is appointed by the president for a term of 2 years and is eligible to be re-appointed for 1 additional term. The five private sector representatives shall likewise be appointed by the president with a term of 2 years.

The executive director of the Department of Trade and Industry - Center for Industrial Competitiveness serves as the NCC Secretariat. The ED is assisted by a nominee from the private sector staff who serves as the operations director.

== Working groups ==
- Agri-Trade Logistics
- Anti-Corruption
- Anti-Smugglong
- Budget Transparency
- Business Permits and Licensing System
- Education and Human Resources Development
- ICT Governance
- Transport, Infrastructure, Trade and Logistics (formerly Infrastructure)
- Judicial System
- National Quality Infrastructure
- Inter-Agency Business Process Interoperability (formerly National Single Window)
- Performance Governance System
- Power and Energy Services

== Ease of Doing Business Initiative | Gameplan for Competitiveness ==
NCC sends updates on the Ease of Doing Business reforms to the IFC to be considered for the next release of the DB Report. Each update contains the description and impact of the reform together with its date of entry into force and legal basis when applicable, and the relevant documents necessary to validate these reforms.

== Cities and Municipalities Competitiveness Index ==
This year, the Municipalities Competitiveness Index covered 1120 lgus- a significant increase as compared to its first run back in 2013 with only 268 lgus. To recognize the most competitive cities and municipalities, the National Competitiveness Council holds its annual Regional Competitiveness Summit. The summit brings together delegates composed of Local Chief Executives, representatives from the LGUs, and delegates from National Government Agencies, the Academe, and the Private Sector.

=== Economic dynamism ===
It is associated with activities that create stable expansion of business and industries and higher employment. This is the concrete representation of productivity as it matches the output of the local economy with local resources.

- Size of the Local Economy (as measured through business registrations, capital, revenue, and permits)
- Growth of the Local Economy (as measured through business registrations, capital, revenue, and permits)
- Capacity to Generate Employment
- Cost of Living
- Cost of Doing Business
- Financial Deepening
- Productivity
- Presence of Business and Professional Organizations

=== Government efficiency ===
This refers to the quality and reliability of government services and government support for effective and sustainable productive expansion.

- Capacity of Health Services
- Capacity of Schools
- Security
- Business Registration Efficiency
- Compliance to Business Permits & Licensing System (BPLS) standards
- Presence of Investment Promotions Unit
- Compliance to National Directives for Local Government Units (LGU)
- Ratio of LGU collected tax to LGU revenues
- Social Protection

The Department of the Interior and Local Government used to measure the local government's score on transparency and economic governance through the Local Governance Performance Management System (LGPMS).

=== Infrastructure ===
It refers to the physical building blocks that connect, expand, and sustain a locality and its surroundings to enable the provision of goods and services. It involves basic inputs of production such as energy, water; interconnection of production such as transportation, roads, and communications; sustenance of production such as waste, disaster preparedness, environmental sustainability and human capital formation infrastructure.

- Existing Road Network
- Distance from City/Municipality Center to Major Ports
- Department of Tourism-Accredited Accommodations
- Availability of Basic Utilities
- Annual Investments in Infrastructure
- Connection of Information and Communications Technologies
- Number of Public Transportation Vehicles
- Health Infrastructure
- Education Infrastructure
- Number of Automated Teller Machines

=== Resiliency ===
It refers to the capacity of a locality to facilitate businesses and industries to create jobs, raise productivity, and increase the incomes of citizens over time despite the shocks and stresses it encounters. This implies that the role of local government is critical in ensuring a competitive environment to make businesses sustain their profits, create jobs, and increase the productivity of its people. In order for a locality to be able to do this, it must be resilient in its infrastructure, governance, social and environmental systems.

- Organization and Coordination: Land Use Plan
- Organization and Coordination: Disaster Risk Reduction Plan
- Organization and Coordination: Annual Disaster Drill
- Organization and Coordination: Early Warning System
- Resiliency Financing: Budget for DRRMP
- Resiliency Reports: Local Risk Assessments
- Resiliency Infrastructure: Emergency Infrastructure
- Resiliency Infrastructure: Utilities
- Resilience of System: Employed Population
- Resilience of System: Sanitary System

=== Partial ranking (2019) ===
==== Province ====
Rank	Province	Region	Score
1	Rizal	Calabarzon	51.4969
2	Laguna	Calabarzon	47.0494
3	Cavite	Calabarzon	46.5152
4	Camiguin	Northern Mindanao	43.7417
5	Batangas	Calabarzon	42.3106
6	Davao del Norte	Davao Region	42.2773
7	Pampanga	Central Luzon	41.3644
8	South Cotabato	SOCCKSARGEN	41.3193
9	Bulacan	Central Luzon	39.9412
10	Benguet	Cordillera Administrative Region	39.3493

== Annual Enterprise Survey on Corruption ==
The Annual Enterprise Survey on Corruption has provided a unique snapshot of the Filipino business sector’s perspectives on corruption and good governance. By pointing out critical areas for reform, and encouraging private and public sector participation in the fight against corruption, the survey proved to have a powerful impact on the conduct of business and economic growth in the Philippines and proved to be an important tool in raising consciousness about the costs of corruption, in advocating for critical reforms, and in measuring the effectiveness of counter-corruption efforts. The survey results have also served as one of the key indicators used by development organizations, academic institutions, government agencies, and civil society in measuring progress in the fight against corruption.

The Enterprise Survey’s data also help the Filipino public track trends on perceptions of corruption, on attitudes of business people towards corruption, their rating of the sincerity of government agencies in fighting corruption, and the business practices of the private sector in dealing with government agencies. The survey is administered through face-to-face interviews with managers of businesses throughout the country where their responses are based on personal experience.

== BPLS Field Monitoring and Evaluation Survey ==
Commissioned by the National Competitiveness Council through the regional and provincial offices of the Department of Trade and Industry and a partner local academe, and as a part of the Good Governance and Anti-Corruption Cluster initiatives, the Field Monitoring and Evaluation Survey aims to determine the compliance rate of the selected local government units in terms of the BPLS standards set for both new and renewal process. The survey also intends to ensure the implementation of the nationwide streamlining of BPLS program through performance and customer feedback. The survey is conducted by a local academe through: interviews, focused group discussions, and through secondary resources (articles, circulars, city ordinances, etc.). Based on the list of lgus provided by the DILG-LGA, a sample size of at least 20 respondents per LGU was determined in the conduct of the survey.

== BPLS Customer Experience Survey ==
The National Competitiveness Council, in partnership with the Department of Trade and Industry’s Regional and Provincial offices launched the conduct of the Customer Experience Survey. The survey is conducted annually during the renewal period of business permits from January to February. The survey aims to: assess the experience of businessmen who renewed their mayor’s permit in the renewal period of January to February; to determine the satisfaction level of businessmen based on the customer satisfaction index framework with the process of renewing their mayor’s permit in their respective lgus.

== See also ==
- Philippine Competition Act
