= Sergio Ortiz-Luis Jr. =

Sergio R. Ortiz-Luis Jr. is a management practitioner in the Philippines. He is the Chairman of the Philippine Chamber of Commerce and Industry (PCCI), the official chamber of commerce of the Philippines. He is the honorary chairman and president of the Employers Confederation of the Philippines (ECOP). He is known as the "Father of Philippine Export".

== Early life ==
Ortiz-Luis Jr., fondly called Sol, was born and raised in Cabiao, Nueva Ecija. He moved to Manila to complete his elementary education at Colegio de San Juan de Letran for Grade 7.

== Education ==
Ortiz-Luis holds degrees in Bachelor of Arts and Bachelor of Science in Business Administration from De La Salle College (now De La Salle University-Manila College of Business and Economics). He also obtained a Master of Business Administration from De La Salle Graduate School (now De La Salle Professional Schools Graduate School of Business). He was conferred Doctor of Humanities (honoris causa) by the Central Luzon State University in 2006.

== Career ==
Ortiz-Luis is the President of the Philippine Exporters Confederation, Inc. (PHILEXPORT). He is concurrently the Chairman of the Export and Industry Bank, a Philippine-based bank catering to the export industries.

He is the Chairman of the EIB Realty & Development Corporation, the real estate subsidiary of the Export and Industry Bank. He is the Founding Director of the Manila Exposition Complex, Inc., now popularly known as the World Trade Center in the Philippines.

== Organizational affiliations ==
Ortiz-Luis is the Chairman of the Philippine Chamber of Commerce and Industry (PCCI). He is also a Commissioner of the Social Security System, the official social service provider of private companies in the country.

He is the Vice-Chairman of the Export Development Council of the Philippines; Vice-Chairman, Philippine Small and Medium Scale Enterprises Development Foundation; and Vice President and Governor of the Employers Confederation of the Philippines, the largest association of employers in the country.

== Diplomacy ==
Ortiz-Luis has been appointed Honorary Consul General of the Consulate of Romania in the Philippines.
