= Philippine Chamber of Commerce and Industry =

Philippine non-government association

Agency overview
- Formed: July 1, 1978; 48 years ago
- Headquarters: PCCI Secretariat Office, 3F Commerce and Industry Plaza, 1030 Campus Ave. cor. Park Ave., McKinley Town Center, Fort Bonifacio, Taguig, Philippines 1634
- Agency executives: George T. Barcelon, (President); Dr. William S. Co, (Chairperson)
- Website: www.philippinechamber.com

The Philippine Chamber of Commerce and Industry (acronymed as either PCI or PCCI) is a non-government association of private businesses that works to influence government actions on issues such as Agriculture, Information Technology, Human Resources, and Tourism.

== History ==
The Chamber of Commerce of the Philippines started on July 19, 1903, as the Philippine Chamber of Commerce (PCI).

In 1948, Hilarion Henares, Sr. established the Small Industries and Machine Shop Owners of the Philippines (abbreviated as SIMSOP) and after two years of establishment, the Chamber of Commerce of the Philippines changed its name to Philippine Chamber of Commerce on March 4, 1950.

On July 1, 1978, PCCI was officially formed and registered with the Securities and Exchange Commission after the merging of Chamber of Commerce of the Philippines (CCP) and Philippine Chamber of Commerce (PCI).
