= Rony V. Diaz =

Rony V. Diaz is a Filipino writer. He has won several Palanca Awards. He joined The Manila Times in 2001 as executive director. He eventually became publisher and president of the Manila Times School of Journalism. He has taught English at the University of the Philippines Diliman and has worked for the Philippine government as a foreign service corp. He is the author of the story "The Centipede".

He is a recipient of a University of the Philippines Fellowship for Literature, a Rockefeller Fellowship for creative writing and is a member of the University of the Philippines Writers Club.

== Early life ==
He was born in Cabanatuan, Nueva Ecija on December 2, 1932.
