= Chinese candy box =

Chinese New Year tradition

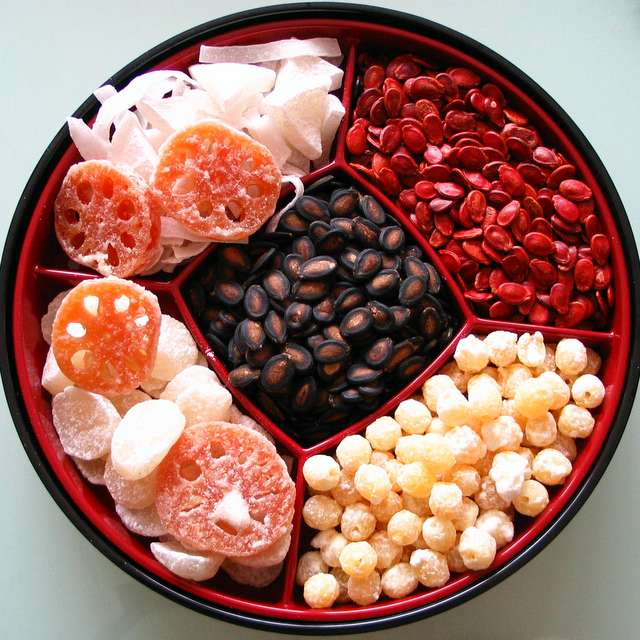
- Chinese: 全盒
- Literal meaning: whole box
Transcriptions
Standard Mandarin
- Hanyu Pinyin: quánhé
Yue: Cantonese
- Yale Romanization: chyun4 haap6
- Jyutping: cyun4 hap6

A Chinese candy box (全盒, or chuen hup/zan hup) is a traditional box used during Chinese New Year for storing candy and other edible goods. Its existence dates as far back as the Ming Dynasty in 1567.

The box usually has a lid; some are more fancy and elaborate than others. It is usually colored with a red or black motif, since traditional candy boxes were lacquerware. Also red symbolizes good fortune and joy (see Color in Chinese culture). They are mostly round or octagonal shaped.

Due to the higher price of lacquerware, most modern Chinese candy boxes are made of plastic, but some of them are still made of lacquerware.

== Name ==
The phrase cheun hup/zan hup combines as "coming together" or "togetherness". The box can also be called "Tray of Togetherness".

== Occasions ==
The box is generally used for Chinese New Year, though some regional Chinese cultures may use it for other important events such as Chinese marriages. Usually it consists of 12, 9, 8 or 6 (Chinese auspicious lucky numbers, see Chinese numerology) compartments that contain sugar preserved dried fruits and vegetables, wrapped candies, fried snacks, and nuts. Some of these foods have traditional associations with meaning.

== Varieties ==
=== Cantonese Version ===
The Cantonese candy box includes items that have traditional, linguistic, and cultural significance to the Cantonese people.

The Lucky candy is a strawberry flavored hard candy packaged in a red aluminum wrapper likened to a red envelope. The most popular and long-standing version of this candy is produced by The Garden Company Unlimited. Like red envelopes, this candy represents luck and prosperity.

The Coconut candy (椰子糖), originally produced by Yan Chim Kee (甄沾記), is another commonly added item. Coconut is a symbol of togetherness and strong family ties. The Cantonese pronunciation of coconut (ye zi) sounds similar to grandfather and grandson.

White Rabbit and Sugus candies, and in more recent years, Ferrero Rocher are other packaged sweets often found in Cantonese candy box, generally added to represent the sweetness of life.

Pastry items like sweet or savory fried dumplings (Yau gok), representing good wealth and fortune, and smiling sesame cookie balls (笑口棗, or siu hau zou) representing happiness, can also be included.

== Items stored ==
Typical items shared during holidays could include:

- Chocolate coins
- Dried candied lotus root
- Dried candied lotus seed
- Dried candied kumquat
- Dried candied mandarin oranges (柑桔)
- Dried candied pineapple
- Dried candied coconut
- Dried candied carrot slices
- Dried candied ginger
- Dried candied water chestnut
- Dried candied winter melon táng dōng guā (lit. candied winter melon)
- Dried melon seeds (瓜子)
- Dried peanuts
- Pistachios
- White Rabbit candy
- Sugus candy
- Savory and sweet fried snacks

== See also ==
- Lacquerware
- Red envelope
- Traditional candies in Hong Kong
