= Grady's Cold Brew =

American coffee company

- Industry: Food and beverage
- Founded: 2011
- Founders: Grady Laird; Dave Sands; Kyle Buckley
- Headquarters: The Bronx
- Products: Cold brew coffee
- Website: www.gradyscoldbrew.com

Grady's Cold Brew is an American coffee company known for its New Orleans-style cold brew coffee. Founded in 2011, the company is based in The Bronx, New York.

== History ==
Grady's Cold Brew was originally started by Grady Laird. He created a New Orleans-style blend while working for GQ Magazine. He was inspired by an article in GQ that taught how to make cold brew coffee concentrate. Laird sold his brew to other magazines in the Condé Nast brand but later quit his job to pursue it full-time. He officially launched the brand in 2011 with the help of Dave Sands and Kyle Buckley.

Grady's was originally sold online and at select retailers in Brooklyn and Manhattan. It gained the attention of Whole Foods while a vendor at Smorgasburg, and began selling at the grocery chain in 2012.

== Products ==
Grady's Cold Brew is a New Orleans-style coffee made using a cold brew method of steeping ground coffee in cold water. The grounds are filtered out after 20 hours to create the concentrate. The company sells both ready-to-drink and concentrate as well as pre-packaged bean bags.
