= Wanderlust Creamery =

American ice cream parlor chain

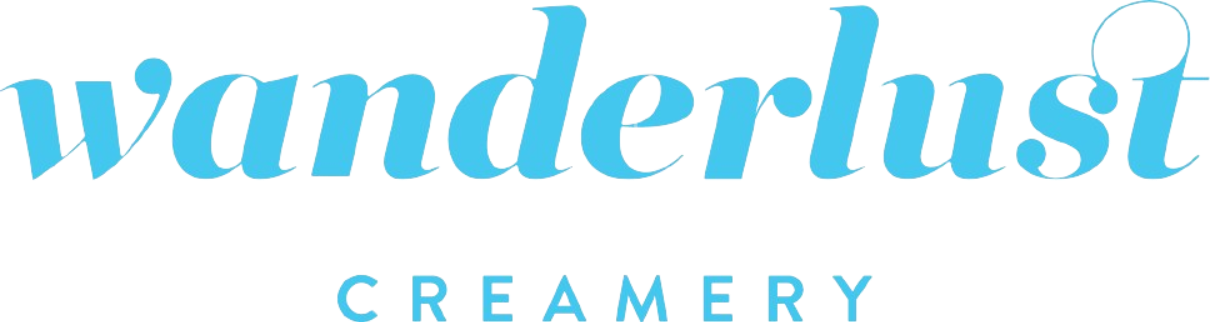
- Type: Private
- Industry: Dessert
- Founded: August 2015
- Founders: Adrienne Borlongan; Jon-Patrick Lopez
- Number of locations: 7 (2024)
- Area served: Southern California
- Website: wanderlustcreamery.com

Wanderlust Creamery is an American chain of ice cream parlors serving Southern California. It is known for its variety of unique flavors, which has attracted attention to it on social media and other platforms.

== History ==
The company was founded by husband-and-wife couple Adrienne Borlongan and Jon-Patrick Lopez. Borlongan's grandfather worked for Magnolia, a leading ice cream brand in the Philippines. They had previously opened a booth at Smorgasburg Los Angeles and opened the chain's first location in Tarzana, Los Angeles in August 2015. It opened its second location, in Atwater Village in 2017. The company went viral and experienced a significant burst in popularity when it collaborated with Foodbeast to release a limited flavor based on the White Rabbit milk candy in 2019. It had also received attention when there were flavors inspired by Filipino culture, Game of Thrones, and breakfast at Café du Monde. During the COVID-19 pandemic, the company was able to recuperate from its losses by shipping their ice cream throughout the United States. It opened its first Orange County store in Irvine in 2023. The creamery also collaborated with Bretman Rock in October 2023 to create the "Da Fruity Salad" flavor, in celebration of Filipino American History Month.

== Menu ==
Wanderlust Creamery has 16 signature flavors, which are not rotated out after the season. These include ube malted crunch, vegan malted ube, mango sticky rice, Kinder, Abuelita malted crunch, vanilla, pistachio, Japanese neapolitan ice cream (made from matcha, sakura, and Hokkaido milk), Vietnamese rocky road, Earl Grey milk chocolate, black sesame cookies and cream, pandan tres leches, passionfruit cacao, smoky road, and hokey pokey.

== Locations ==
As of 2024, the chain has seven locations, in Atwater Village, Fairfax, Irvine, Pasadena, Sawtelle Japantown, Tarzana, and Venice. It also participates in Los Angeles' Smorgasburg, occupying a weekly stall there.
