= Brownstoner =

American website and magazine

- Cover of the first edition published in 2017
- Publication date: 2017

Brownstoner began as "a Brooklyn-based website" and in 2017 added a printed edition. It is currently owned by Schneps Communications, a local operator of other newspapers and digital publications.

== History ==
=== Weblog ===
Originally titled Brownstoner, it began as a blog in 2004. A sister site named Queens Brownstoner was begun in 2013 by Brownstoner founder Jonathan Butler, who also launched the Brooklyn Flea and Smorgasburg.

One of Brownstoner's bloggers is a lay historian who writes weekly about Brooklyn architecture, including the site's "Building of the Day" column, and also does a post each month on upstate New York architecture.

=== BlankSlate ===
Brownstoner was acquired by BlankSlate in 2015 after 10 years and over 42,000 blog posts. BlankSlate was founded by Kael Goodman as a digital marketing agency; Brownstoner was a client.

=== Schneps Communications ===
Schneps Communications acquired Brownstoner from BlankSlate in 2017. Schneps also publishes Brokelyn, The Brooklyn Home Reporter, The Brooklyn Spectator and The Queens Courier.

== Building of the Day column ==
Brownstoner's Building of the Day column recognizes architectural notability.

== Coverage ==
Brownstoner writes about the past and the present, and has covered topics including:

- A 1650s building believed to be the oldest existing building in New York State
- The laying out of the NYC street grid
- Effects of the development of the NYC train system's three component divisions on the growth of housing
- Areas that remained farmland even as parts of Brooklyn were growing into a city
- Noting a web site that listed more than 100 "micro-neighborhoods" in Brooklyn
- Covering smaller two-family houses developed by Fred Trump, who was better known for his larger buildings.

The site averages 15 to 20 posts per day on various local subjects of interest. Brownstoner founder Butler conceded that much of his eclectic material comes from tips.

== See also ==
- Long Island Press
- The Villager (Manhattan)
