= Small Laude =

Filipino content creator

- Born: Marissa Eduardo; June 17, 1968 (age 58); Nueva Ecija, Philippines
- Occupations: Content creator; entrepreneur
- Spouse: Philip Laude (m. 1993)
- Children: 4
- Relatives: Alice Eduardo (sister)

YouTube information
- Channel: Small Laude
- Years active: 2019–present
- Subscribers: 2.57 million
- Views: 428 million
- Last updated: 9 July 2026

Marissa "Small" Eduardo-Laude (born June 17, 1968) is a Filipino businesswoman and YouTuber. Her videos focus on family life, travel, and fashion. Her YouTube channel gained a large following in the Philippines and her content has been featured in lifestyle publications.

== Early life and family ==
Small Laude was born Marissa Eduardo on June 17, 1968. She is the sister of businesswoman Alice Eduardo, founder of Sta. Elena Construction and Development Corporation.

Laude's family owns a farm in Jaen, Nueva Ecija, where she frequently spent her summers as a child planting vegetables. She maintains active ties to her home province, participating in gatherings with fellow Novo Ecijanos.

Laude studied at St. Paul University Manila, while her husband Philip Laude studied at De La Salle University.

== Career ==
=== Digital media ===
Laude began publishing lifestyle videos on YouTube, documenting her daily life, travel, family activities, and shopping. In 2020, Lifestyle.INQ published a feature about her growing YouTube following and the popularity of her online videos.

In interviews with Philstar.com, Laude discussed starting vlogging later in life and her experiences creating online content.

Esquire Philippines included Laude in its 2022 list of the country's "Wielders of Soft Power", which highlighted individuals with influence in business, society, and entertainment.

=== Television ===
Laude hosted the Metro Channel lifestyle program It's A Small World.

In 2022, she made a guest appearance in the GMA Network drama series Mano Po Legacy: The Flower Sisters.

Year	Title	Role
2021	It's a Small World	Host
2022	Mano Po Legacy: The Flower Sisters	Guest appearance

=== Business ventures ===
Laude has been included in several influence-related listings by Tatler Asia and other publications. She has appeared in Tatler Asia's Asia's Most Influential (Philippines) profile listings and was included in Esquire Philippines' list of "Wielders of Soft Power". In 2025, Tatler Philippines featured sisters Alice Eduardo and Small Laude in connection with its Tatler Most Influential Philippines list.

Year	Recognition
2021	Asia's Most Influential (Philippines) (Tatler Asia profile listing)
2022	Included in Esquire Philippines list of "Wielders of Soft Power"
2023	Asia's Most Influential (Philippines) (Tatler Asia profile listing)
2024	Asia's Most Influential (Philippines) (Tatler Asia profile listing)
2025	Tatler Most Influential Philippines

== Personal life ==
Laude is married to businessman Philip Laude, whose family owns Candyman Incorporated, a confectionary company best known for its locally produced version of the White Rabbit milk candy, Kendi Mint, Orange Kist, and Viva. The couple have four children.
