= Orange jelly =

Orange jelly may refer to:

- Orange jelly candy, a Hong Kong candy
- Gelatin dessert that is orange in color
- Dacrymyces chrysospermus, a jelly-like fungus
