= Brooklyn Flea =

American flea market company

- Industry: Flea market
- Founded: April 2008 in Brooklyn, New York
- Founder: Jonathan Butler and Eric Demby
- Products: Smorgasburg
- Website: brooklynflea.com

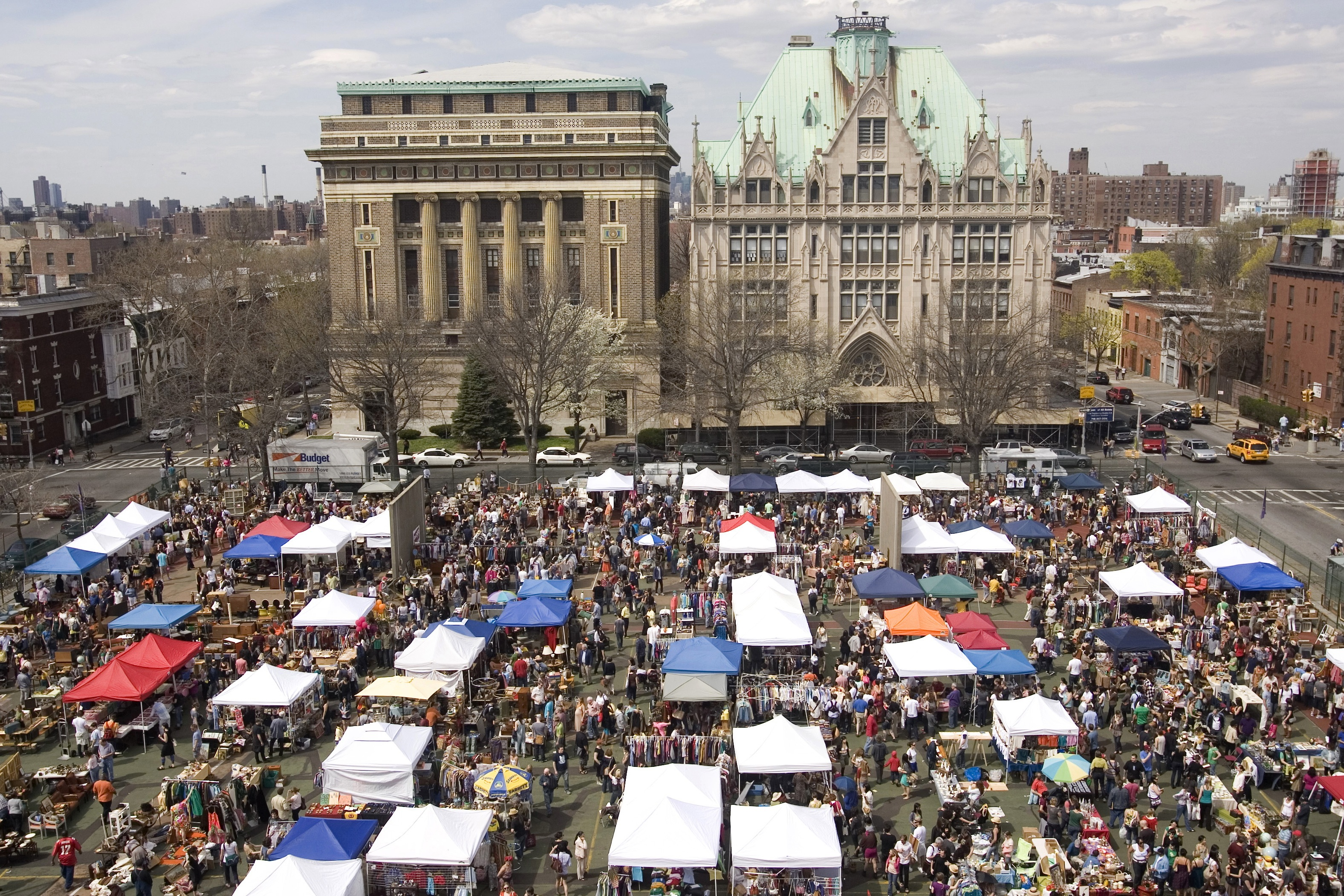
The Brooklyn Flea in Fort Greene.

Brooklyn Flea is a company based in Brooklyn, New York. Founded in 2008 by Jonathan Butler, creator of Brownstoner Magazine, and Eric Demby, the former communications director for Brooklyn Borough President Marty Markowitz, Brooklyn Flea runs several of the largest flea markets on the East Coast of the United States.

== Description ==
Featuring hundreds of vendors of antique and repurposed furniture, vintage clothing, collectibles and antiques, the flea also offers new jewelry, art, crafts, and apparel by local artisans and designers, as well as local food. From early April until late November, the flea markets are located at Bishop Loughlin Memorial High School in Fort Greene on Saturdays and at the Williamsburg waterfront on Sundays. During the winter months, the Flea moves indoors to a 50,000 ft^{2} (4,600 m^{2}) space in Industry City. Average daily attendance for each market is four to five thousand people.

In July 2015, Smorgasburg Queens launched an outdoor lot and indoor building location with hours every Saturday in Long Island City. Brooklyn Flea also operates and curates the food and beverage concessions at Central Park SummerStage. In August 2015 an expansion to Breeze Hill in Prospect Park was announced.

== Honors ==
In 2009, the Flea received a Certificate of Merit from the Municipal Art Society for making an “exceptional contribution to the life of New York City,” and for “providing an alternative to big-box retail that embodies a private sector spirit while yielding generous public benefits."

In 2010, the Citizens Union honored the Flea with its Community Leadership Award for “creativity in building forums for exchange—both physical and virtual—that are strengthening New Yorkers’ spirit of community."

In 2011, Brooklyn Flea opened "Smorgasburg," an all-food market on Saturdays at their Williamsburg waterfront location focusing on local and artisanal fare. Smorgasburg features around seventy vendors of locally produced food and cooking accessories. It is now also held in the Brooklyn neighborhood of Dumbo on Sundays.

Although Brooklyn Flea food vendors change on a week to week basis, they often included approximately 20 recurring, longtime vendors until March 2014. These regulars, who had been participants since the beginning in 2008, were purged from the Fort Greene market. Citing a "move back toward a more traditional flea market, with vintage/antiques, furniture and collectibles at its core," the vendors, who had been contractually restricted by Brooklyn Flea from participating in other markets, were notified less than three weeks before start of the 2014 season.

== Gallery ==
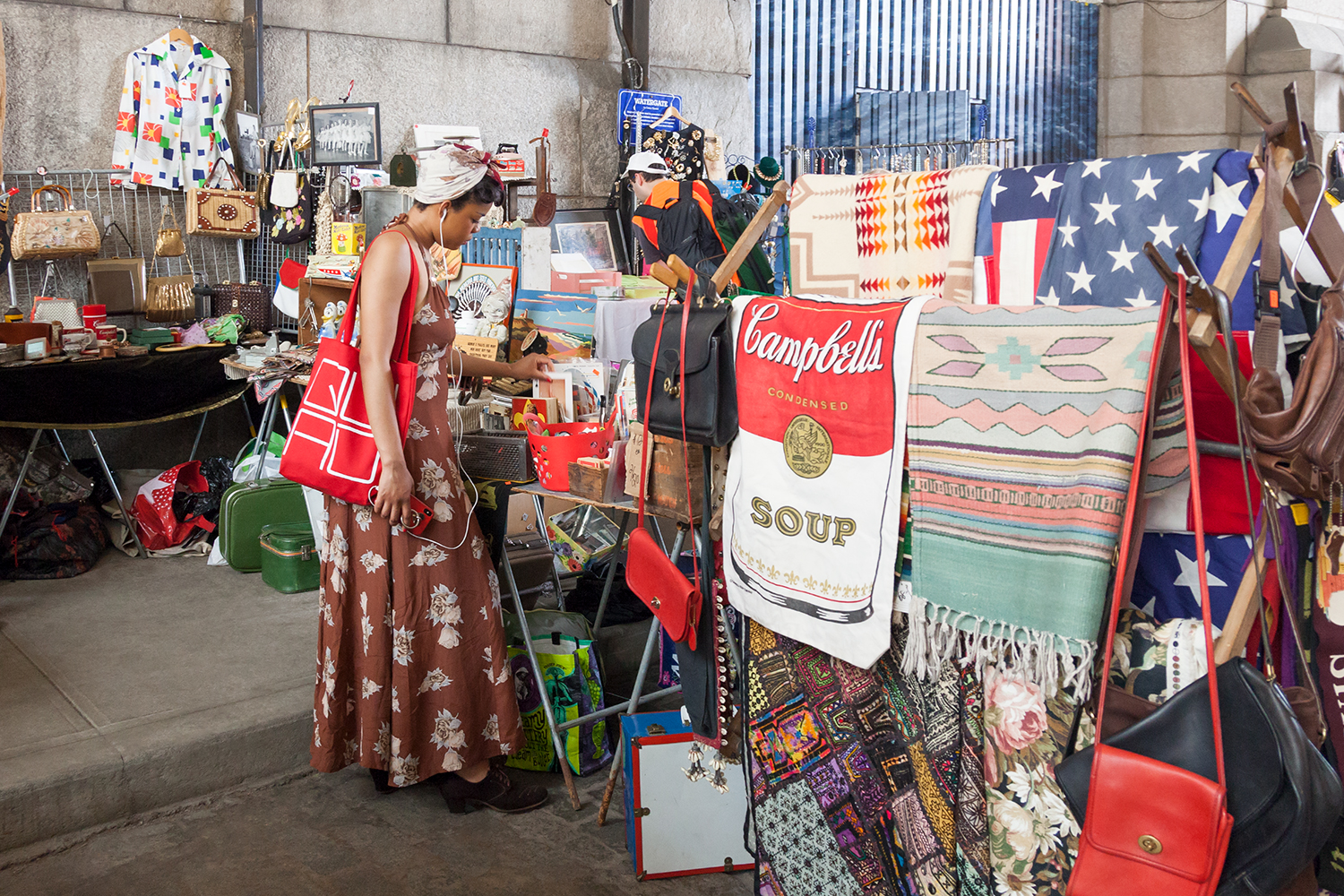
Vendor display at the Brooklyn Flea in DUMBO archway

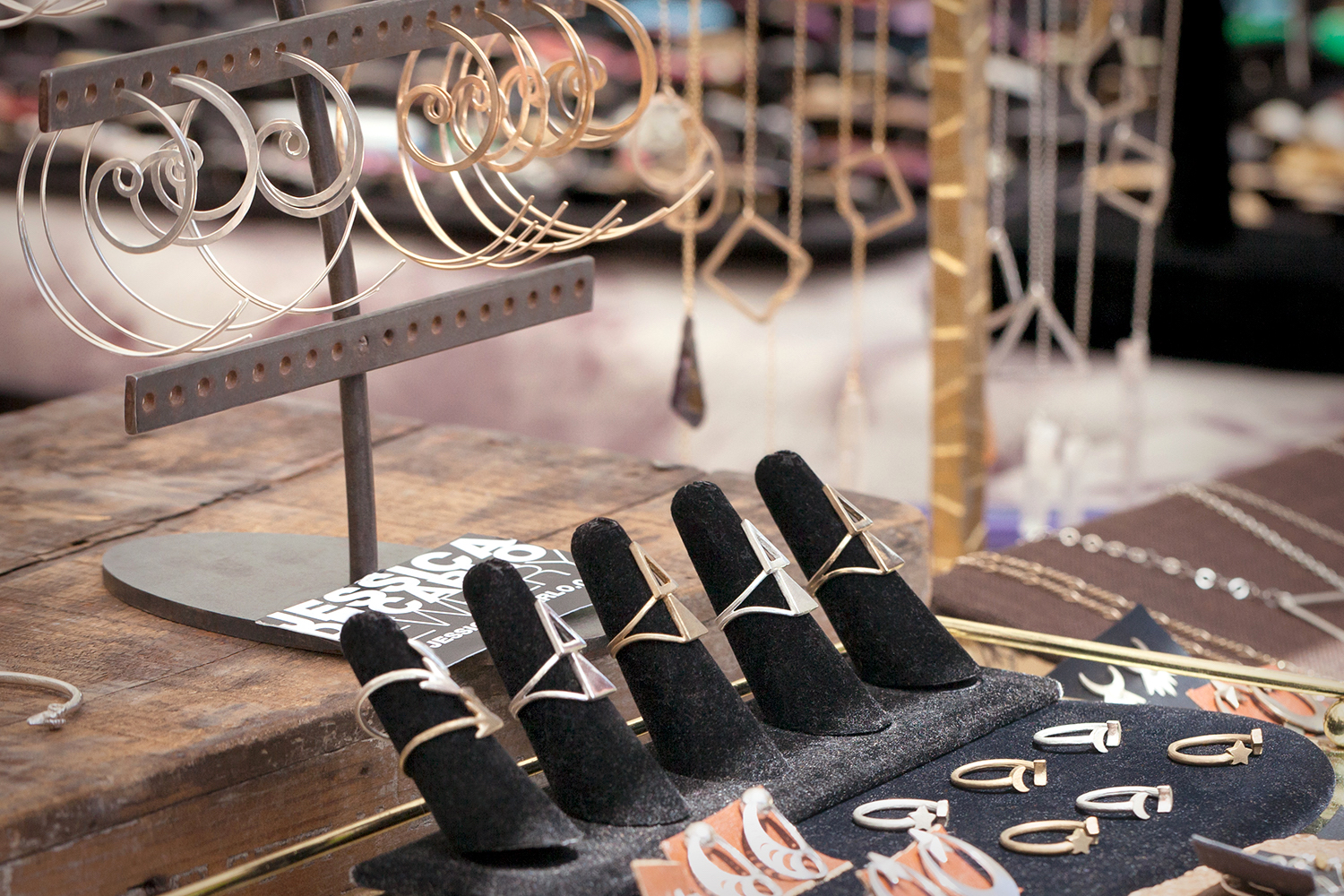
Jewelry display at Brooklyn Flea

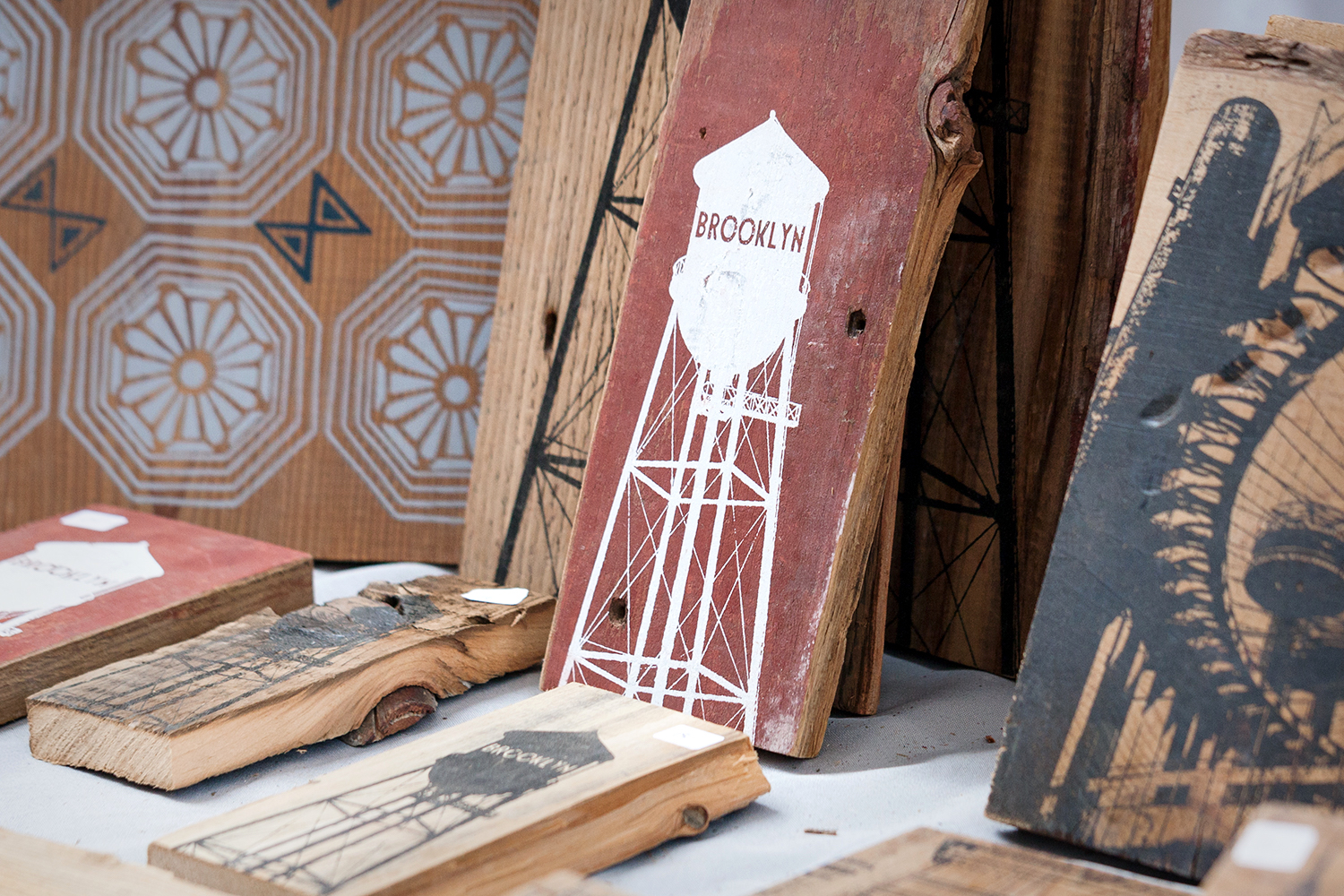
Screen printed designs on reclaimed barn wood

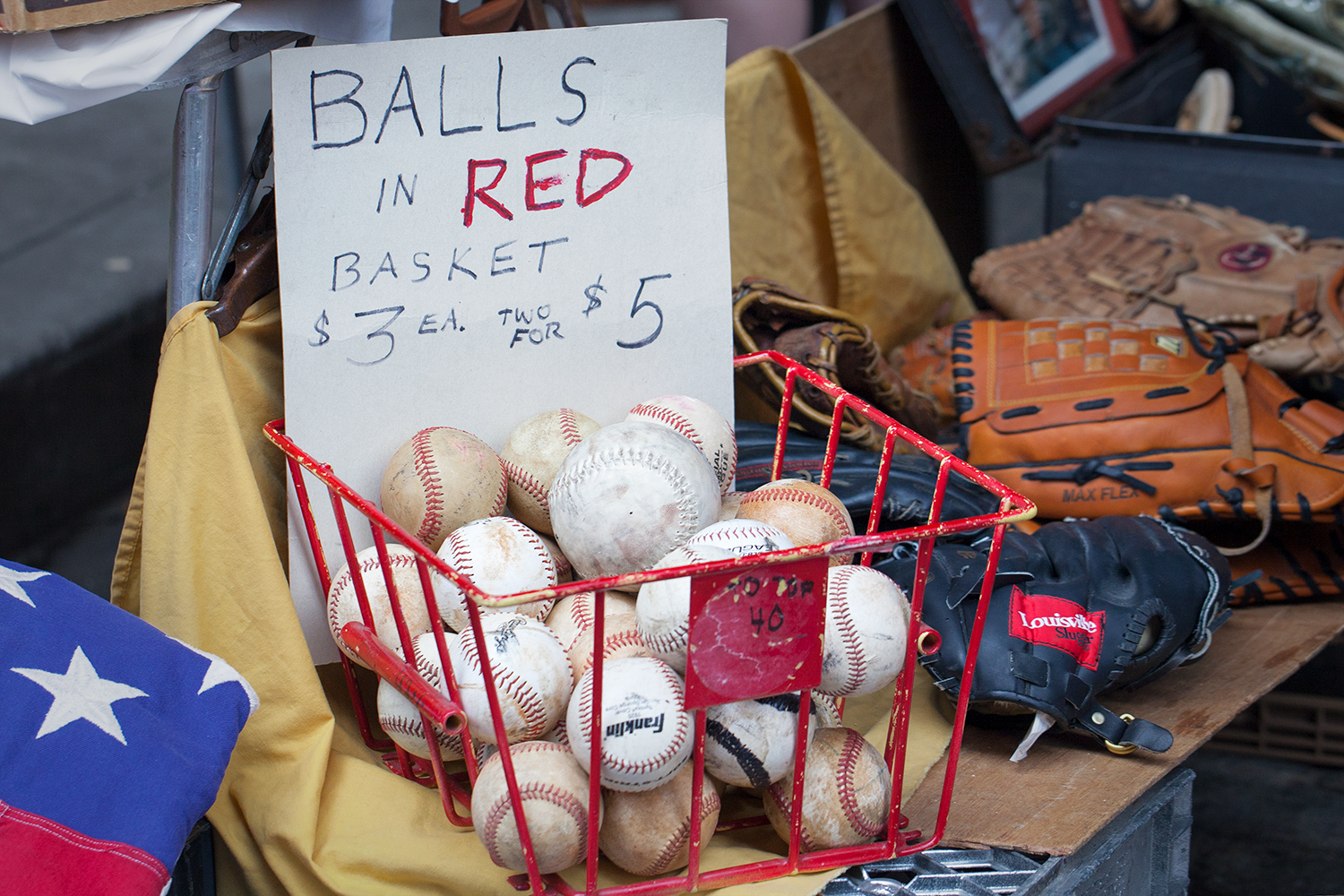
Baseball items for sale at Brooklyn Flea

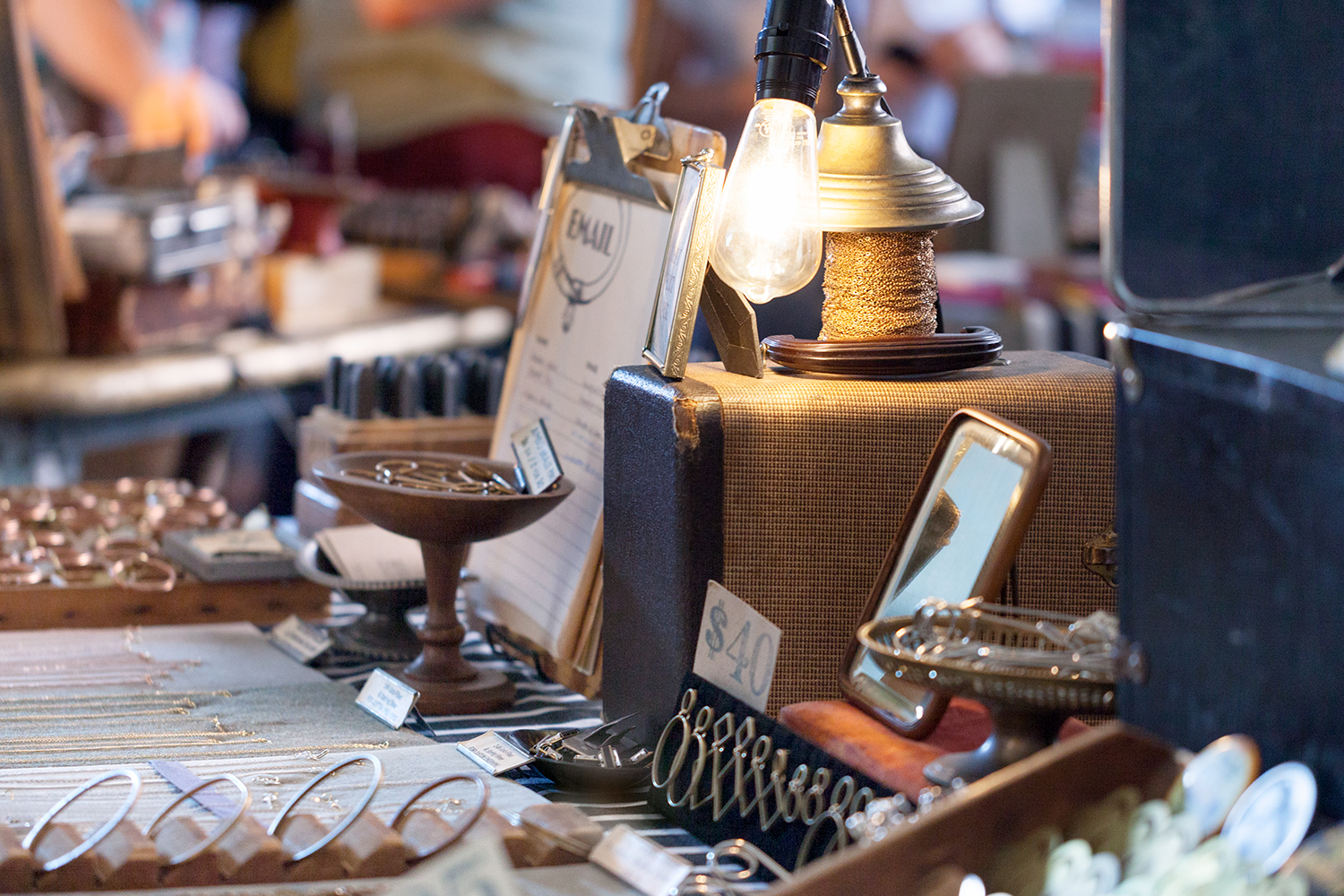
Custom engraved jewelry for sale at Brooklyn Flea

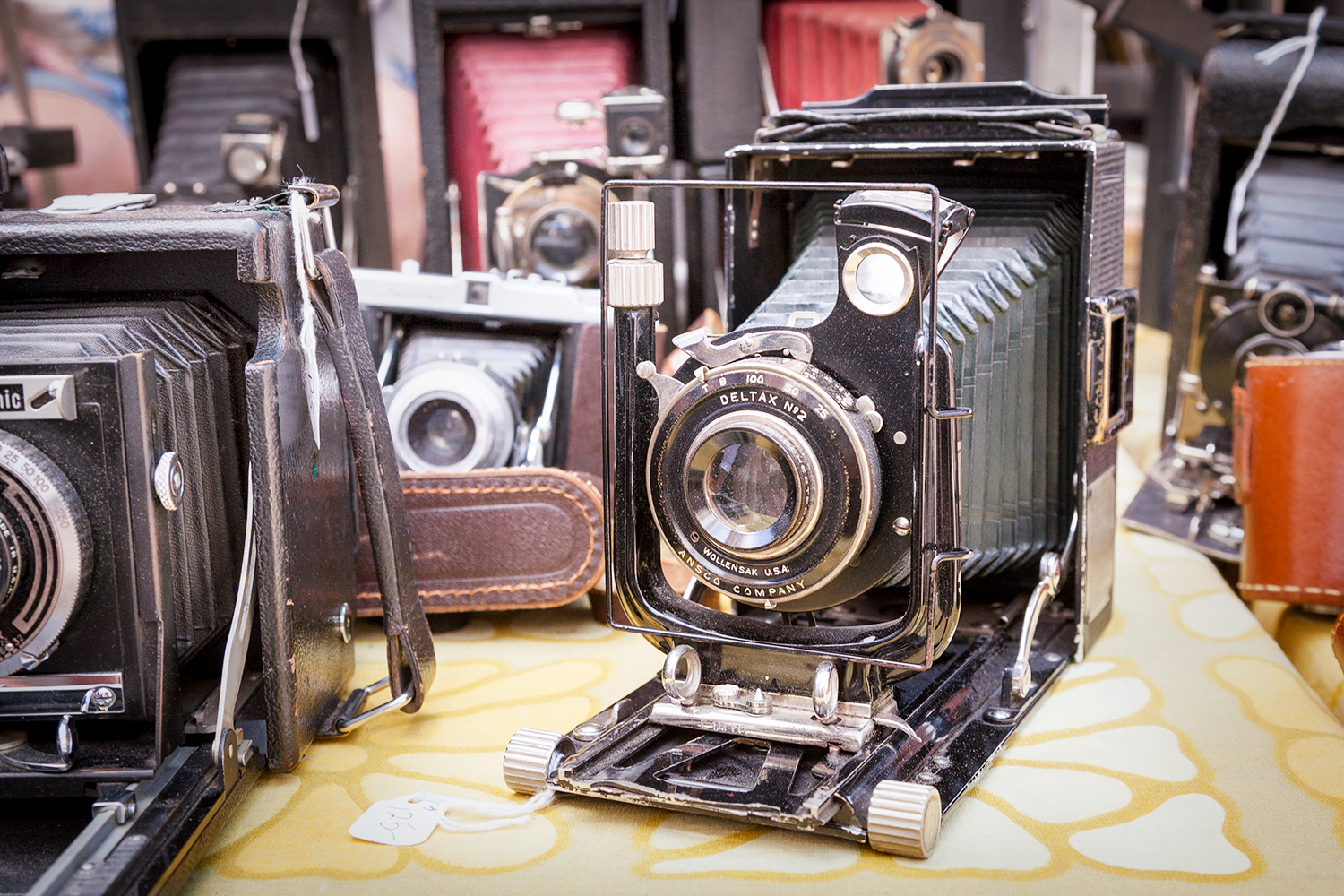
Vintage cameras for sale at Brooklyn Flea

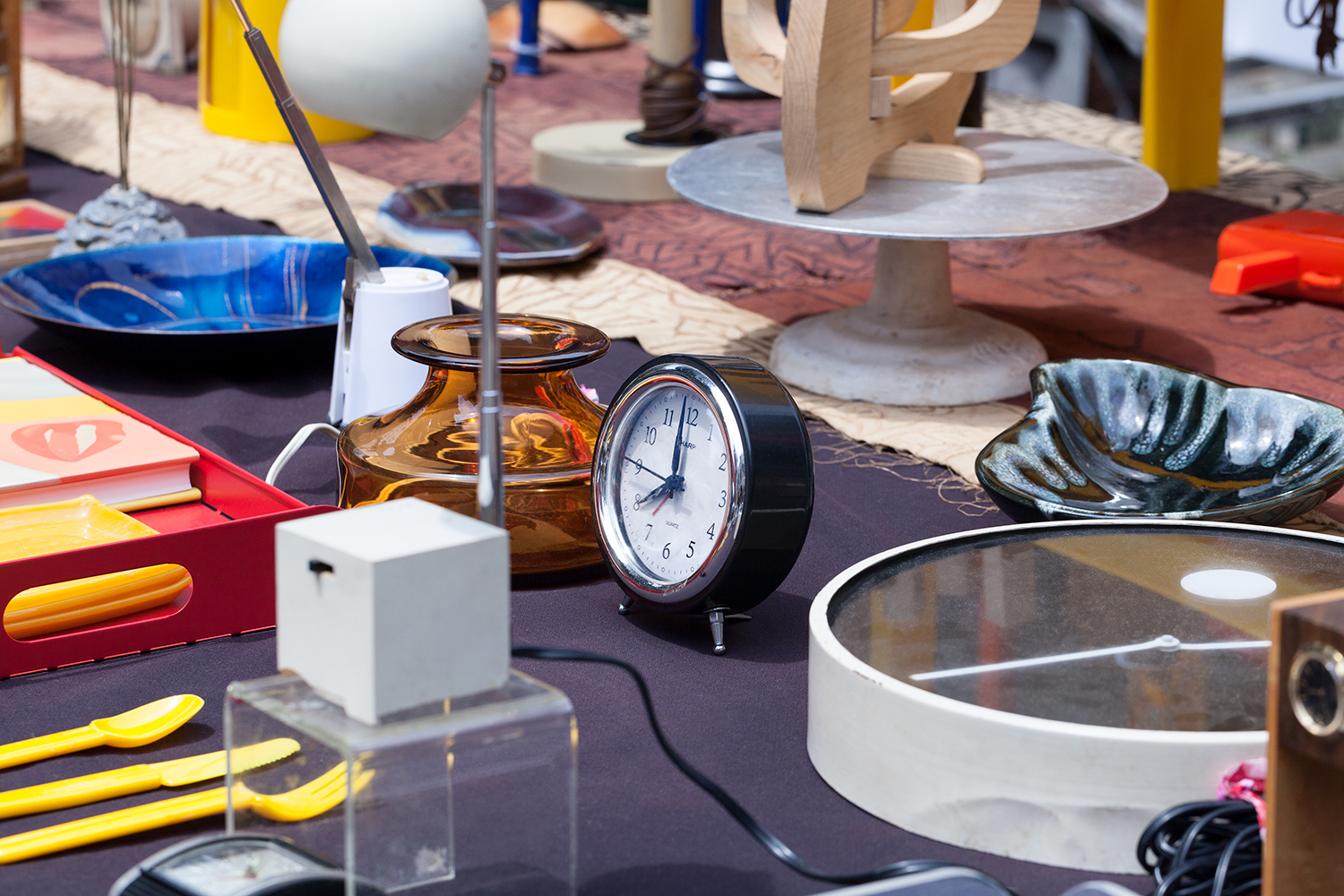
Secondhand items for sale at Brooklyn Flea in DUMBO

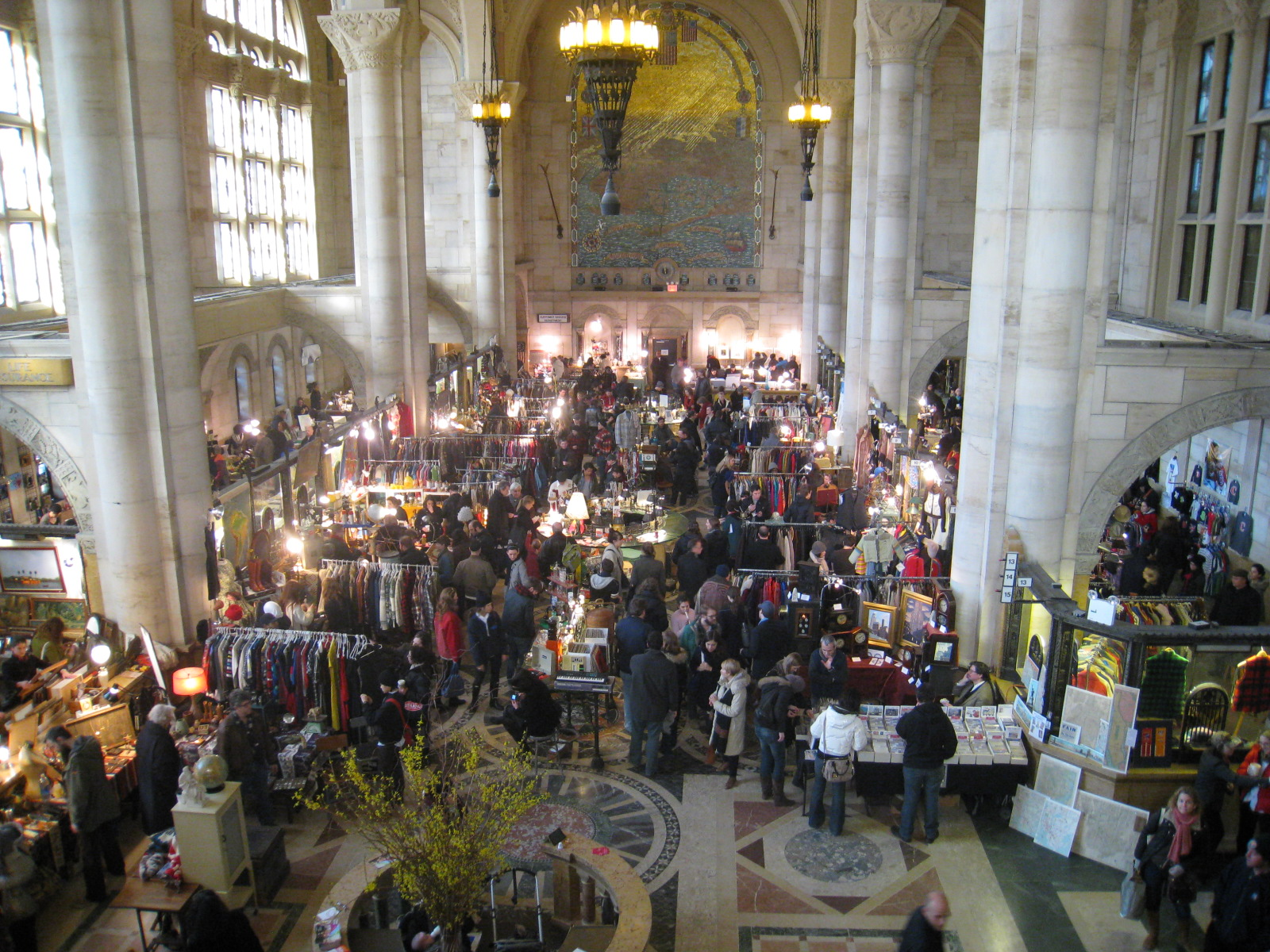
The Brooklyn Flea at Skylight One Hanson.

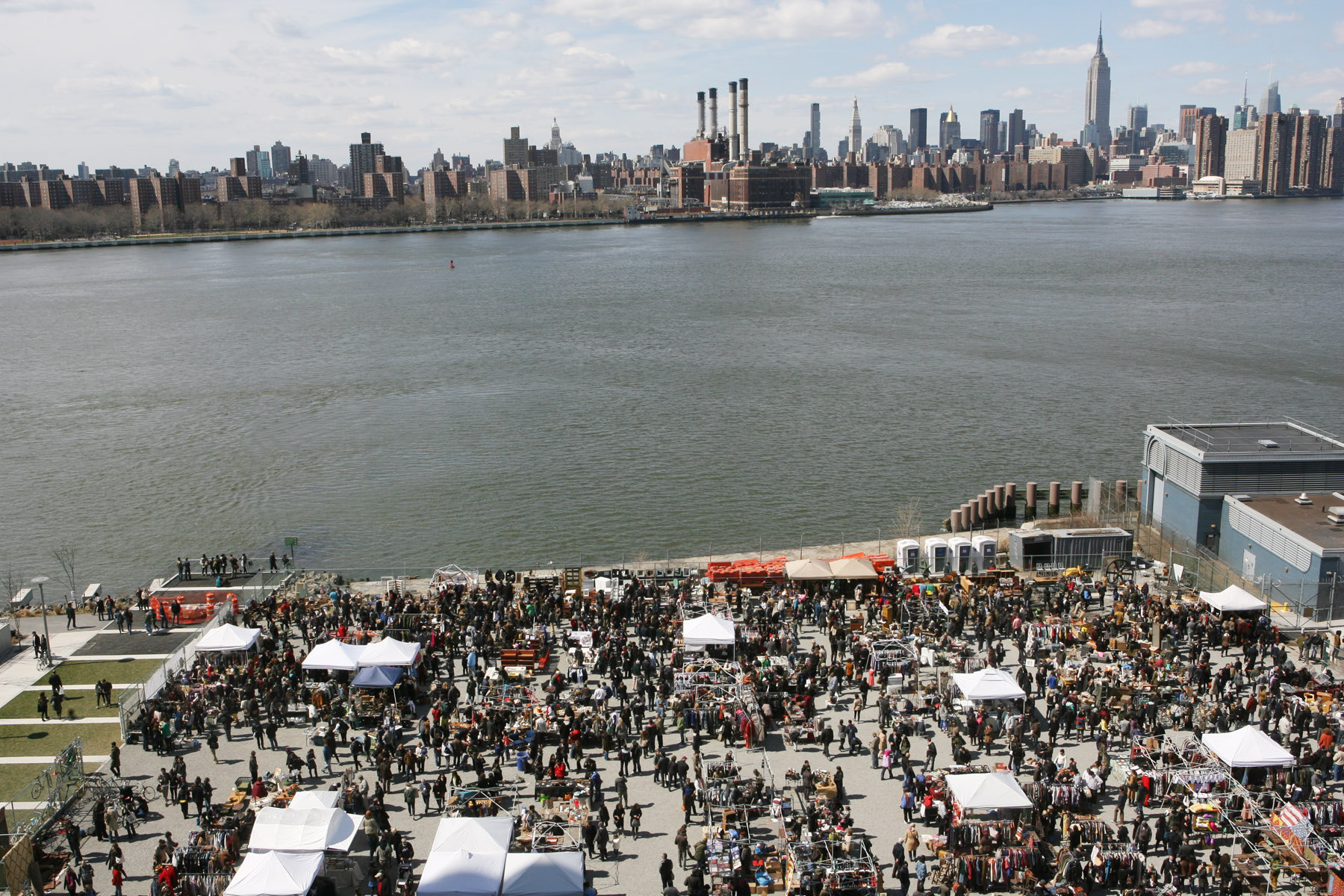
The Brooklyn Flea on the Williamsburg waterfront.

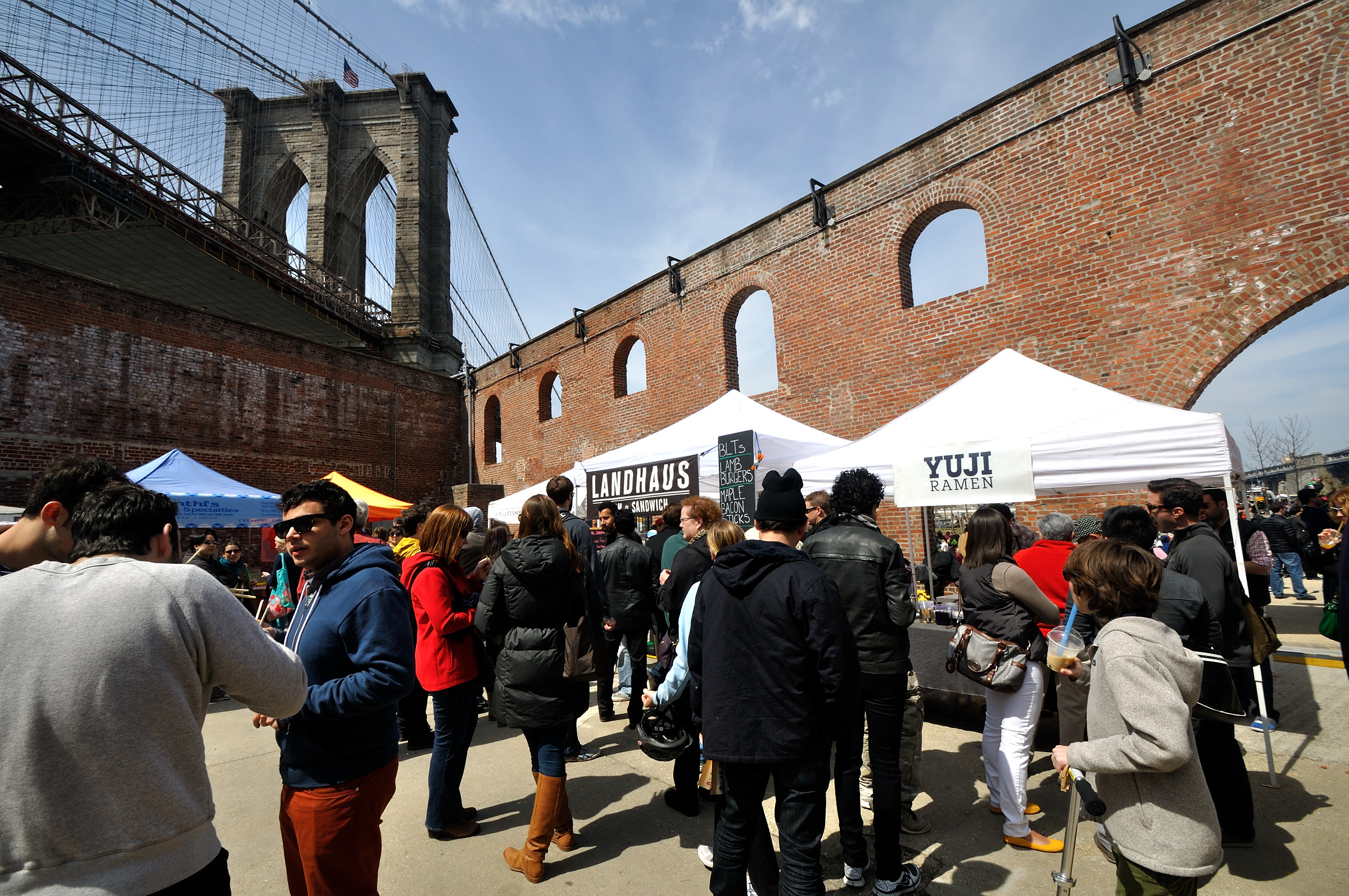
Smorgasburg in on the Dumbo waterfront.
