= Jaen, Nueva Ecija =

Municipality in Nueva Ecija, Philippines

Jaen
- Municipality
- Municipality of Jaen
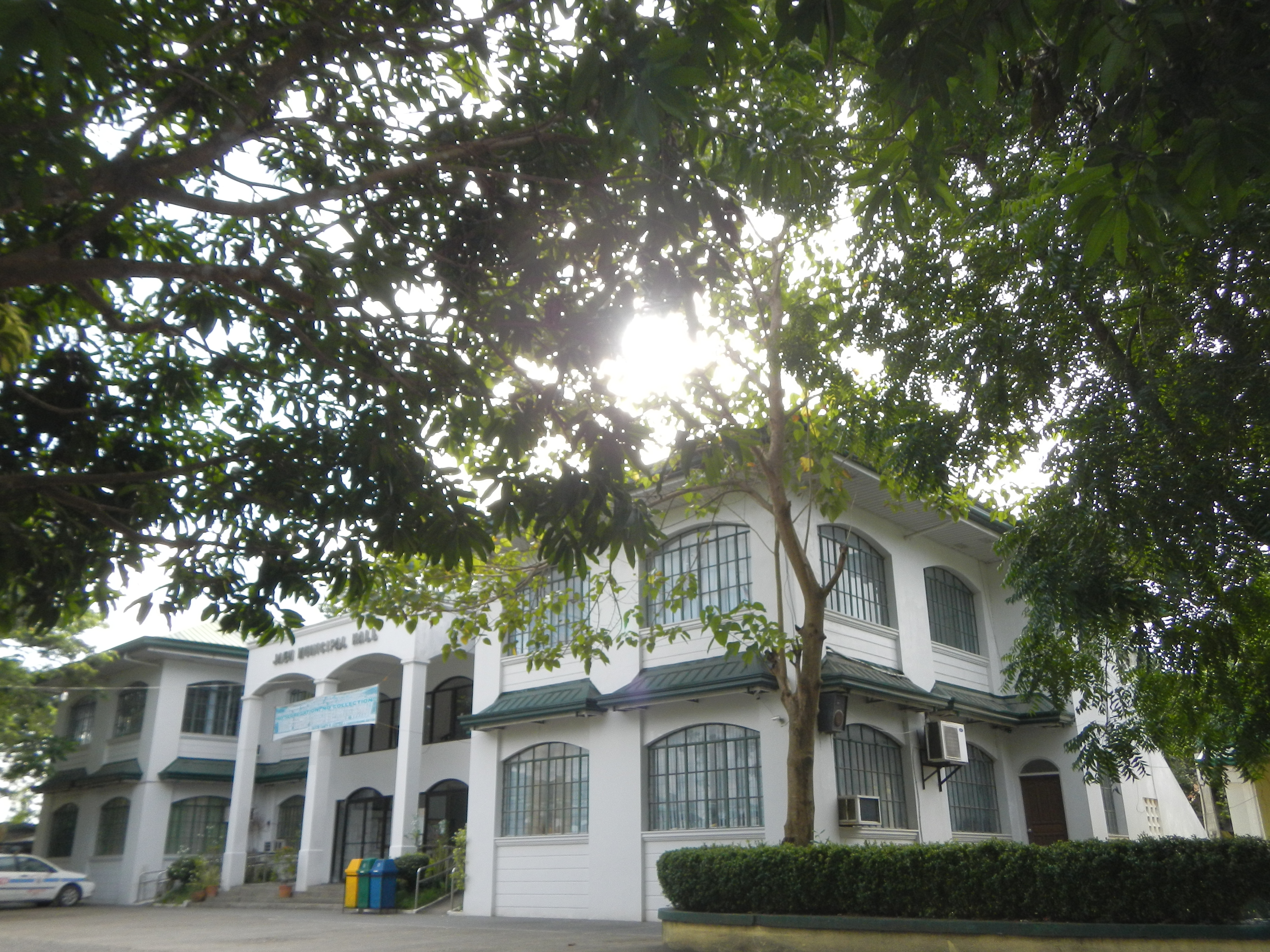
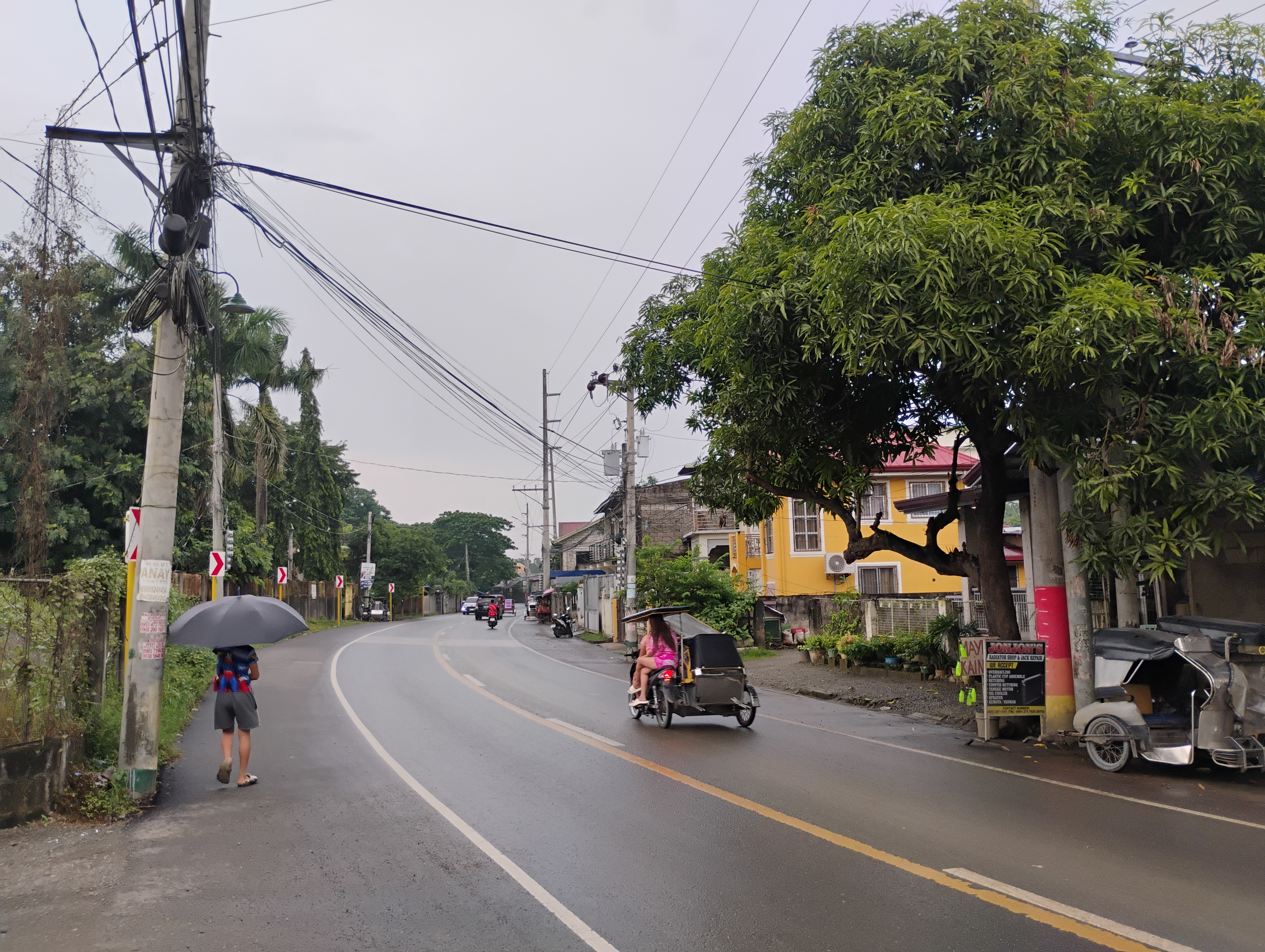
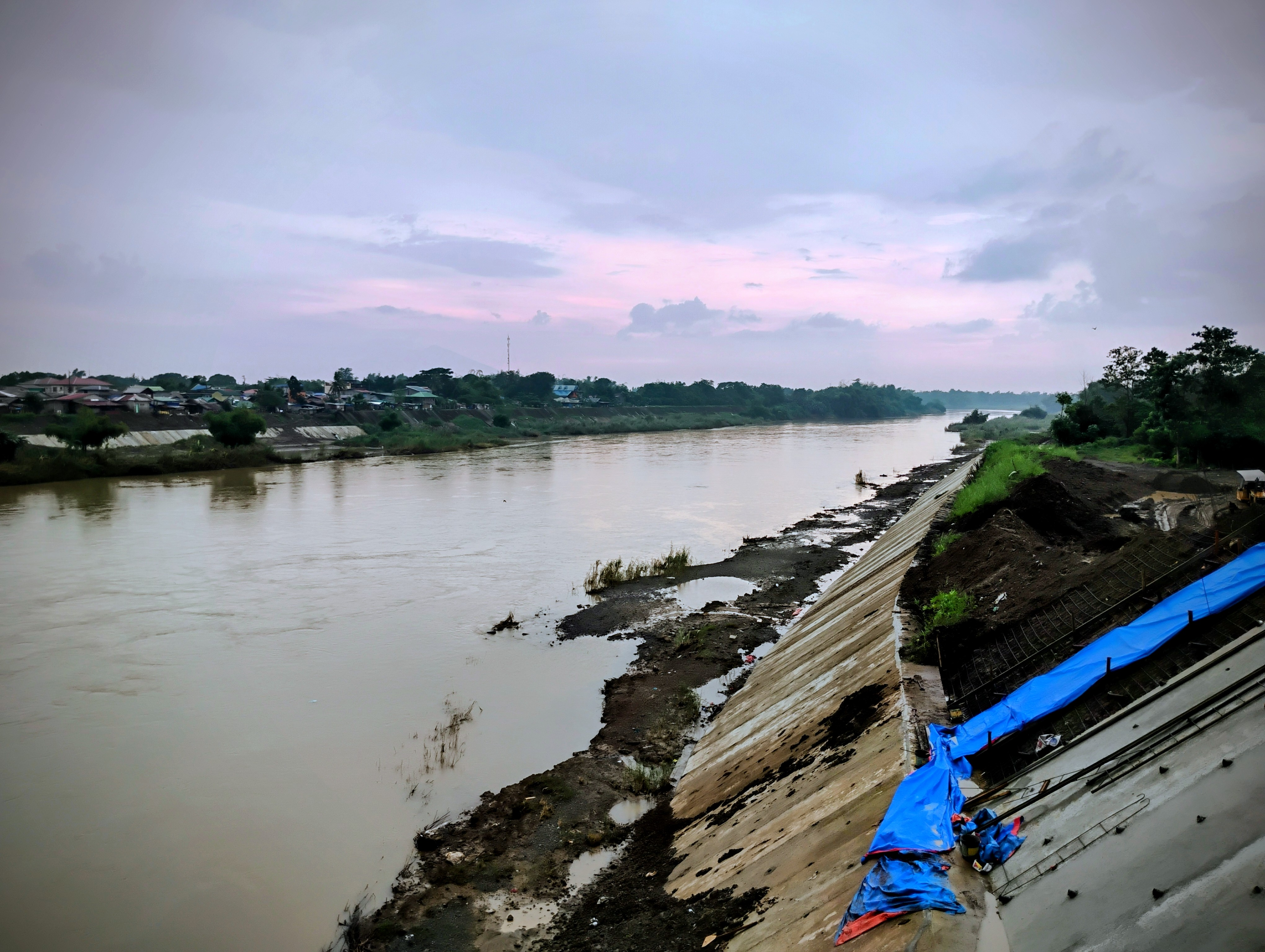
- Jaen Municipal Hall Provincial Road Pampanga River in Jaen

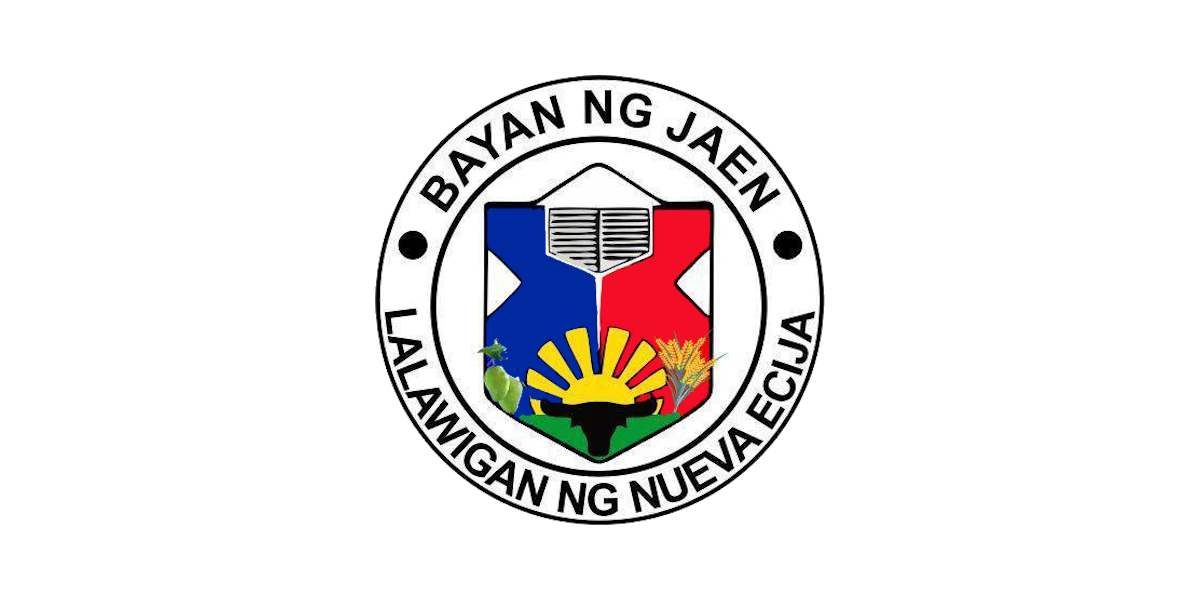
- Flag Seal

- Map of Nueva Ecija with Jaen highlighted
- Interactive map of Jaen
- Location within the Philippines
- Coordinates: 15°20′21″N 120°54′25″E
- Country: Philippines
- Region: Central Luzon
- Province: Nueva Ecija
- District: 4th district
- Founded: June 18, 1865
- Named for: Jaén, Spain
- Barangays: 27 (see Barangays)

Government
  - Type: Sangguniang Bayan
  - Mayor: Sylvester C. Austria
  - Vice Mayor: Santy Eduardo Matias
  - Representative: Emerson D. Pascual
  - Municipal Council: Members: Sylvester C. Austria; Crisanto E. Matias; Josephine C. Angeles; Donald B. Carlos; Arsenia E. Javate; Antonio N. Ocampo; Clifford S. Miranda; Joseph Norman M. Velarde
  - Electorate: 57,234 voters (2025)

Area
  - Total: 85.46 km^{2} (33.00 sq mi)
- Elevation: 22 m (72 ft)
- Highest elevation: 36 m (118 ft)
- Lowest elevation: 13 m (43 ft)

Population (2024 census)
  - Total: 83,895
  - Density: 981.7/km^{2} (2,543/sq mi)
  - Households: 21,000

Economy
  - Income class: 1st municipal income class
  - Poverty incidence: 8.19% (2023)
  - Revenue: ₱ 299.5 million (2024)
  - Assets: ₱ 820.5 million (2024)
  - Expenditure: ₱ 264 million (2024)
  - Liabilities: ₱ 253.6 million (2024)

Service provider
  - Electricity: Nueva Ecija 1 Electric Cooperative (NEECO 1)
- Time zone: UTC+8 (PST)
- ZIP code: 3109
- PSGC: 0304912000
- IDD : area code: +63 (0)44
- Native languages: Tagalog; Ilocano

Jaen, officially the Municipality of Jaen (Filipino: Bayan ng Jaen, Ilocano: Ili ti Jaen), is a municipality in the province of Nueva Ecija, Philippines. According to the 2024 census, it has a population of 83,895 people.

== History ==
During the Spanish Era, the municipality was only a component barrio of Gapan. When San Isidro became a town and was separated from Gapan, the town and San Antonio became one of its component barrios. When San Antonio itself became a town, the area was still its component barrio called San Agustin. By 1865, Jaen was known by its old name "Ibayong Ilog", and because there were many people in the river port in what is now Barangay Langla, the town became a centre for trade.

When the place improved and its population grew to more than 5,000 people, it became a town through a petition filed by the inhabitants with the initiative of two early leaders, Kabesang Prudencio Esquivel and Kapitan Antonio Embuscado. On June 18, 1865, Jaen itself partitioned from San Antonio, and retained Saint Augustine of Hippo as its patron saint. The Spanish officials signed the papers granting the petition that "Ibayong Ilog" be a town in Factoria (now San Isidro) which was then the capital of Nueva Ecija. The declaration was brought to Governor-General Juan de Lara e Irigoyen in Manila and afterwards was submitted to the Vicar-General of the Philippines in the person of Reverend Gregorio Martínez. Father Martínez marked the document as approved but later wrote in his own wish that the name "Ibayong Ilog" be changed to the name of his birthplace of Jaén, Spain.

In coordination with Reverend Estanislao B. Moso, Kabesang Prudencio and Kapitan Antonio led the establishment of the Catholic parish church.

On August 24, 1896, its people revolted against the Spaniards and in September of the same year, armed with bolos and spears, ambushed and killed forty Spanish soldiers in Lumanas (now a Sitio of Barangay Santo Tomas South). This successful attack made Lumanas a historical site called "Pinagtambangan", where a marker was erected in memory of the event.

== Geography ==
The municipality is situated in the southern part of Nueva Ecija, some 100 kilometres (62 mi) north of Manila. Jaén is bounded by the municipalities of Santa Rosa on the north-east; Zaragoza on the north-west; by San Isidro on the south; San Leonardo on the east and by San Antonio on the west.

The municipality has a land area of 10,254 hectares (25,340 acres) and is divided into 27 barangays, two of which are in the Población proper.

=== Barangays ===
Jaén is politically subdivided into 27 barangays, as listed below. Each barangay consists of puroks and some have sitios.

- Calabasa
- Dampulan (Poblacion)
- Don Mariano Marcos (Poblacion) (Former Antonino)
- Hilera
- Imbunia
- Imelda de Poblacion (Doña Aurora)
- Lambakin
- Langla
- Magsalisi
- Malabon-Kaingin
- Marawa
- Niyugan
- Ocampo-Rivera (Poblacion)
- Pakol
- Pamacpacan
- Pinanggaan
- Putlod
- San Jose
- San Josef (Nabao)
- San Pablo
- San Roque
- San Vicente
- Santa Rita
- Santo Tomas North
- Santo Tomas South
- Sapang
- Ulanin-Pitak

==== Sitios ====
- Sanggalang (Brgy Lambakin)
- Pampangbana (Brgy Lambakin)
- Malaiba (Barangay San Jose)
- Mediatrix Subdivision (Brgy Sapang & Dampulan)
- Iran (Brgy San Jose)
- BLISS (Barangay Niyugan)
- Putol (Barangay Niyugan)
- Tumana (Brgy Niyugan)
- Lumanas (Barangay Sto Tomas South)
- Daang Hapon (Brgy Sto Tomas South)
- Campugo (Brgy Sto Tomas South)
- Kaingin (Barangay Sto Tomas North)
- Muyod (Barangay Sto Tomas North)
- Macapulo (Barangay San Pablo)
- Poultry (Barangay Magsalisi)
- Pinagsugalan (Barangay Pinanggaan)
- Inalin (Brgy Pinanggaan)
- Triangulo (Brgy Sapang)
- Gubat na Munti (Brgy Putlod)
- Luwasan (Brgy Putlod)
- Looban (Brgy Putlod)
- Mitla (Brgy Hilera)
- Bungo (Brgy San Roque)
- Dampe (Brgy Dampulan)
- Bantog (Brgy Marawa)

=== Climate ===
Climate data for Jaen, Nueva Ecija
Month	Jan	Feb	Mar	Apr	May	Jun	Jul	Aug	Sep	Oct	Nov	Dec	Year
Mean daily maximum °C (°F)	29 (84)	30 (86)	31 (88)	34 (93)	33 (91)	31 (88)	30 (86)	29 (84)	29 (84)	30 (86)	30 (86)	29 (84)	30 (87)
Mean daily minimum °C (°F)	20 (68)	20 (68)	20 (68)	22 (72)	24 (75)	24 (75)	24 (75)	24 (75)	24 (75)	23 (73)	22 (72)	21 (70)	22 (72)
Average precipitation mm (inches)	4 (0.2)	4 (0.2)	5 (0.2)	11 (0.4)	66 (2.6)	99 (3.9)	127 (5.0)	113 (4.4)	99 (3.9)	84 (3.3)	35 (1.4)	14 (0.6)	661 (26.1)
Average rainy days	2.2	1.9	3.2	5.3	16.1	20.8	23.5	22.8	22.2	16.5	8.9	3.5	146.9
Source: Meteoblue

== Demographics ==
Population census of Jaen

Year	Pop.	±% p.a.
1903	4,465	—
1918	8,015	+3.98%
1939	14,408	+2.83%
1948	14,516	+0.08%
1960	20,438	+2.89%
1970	28,712	+3.45%
1975	33,626	+3.22%
1980	39,064	+3.04%

Year	Pop.	±% p.a.
1990	47,346	+1.94%
1995	53,541	+2.33%
2000	58,274	+1.83%
2007	63,474	+1.19%
2010	67,057	+2.02%
2015	73,184	+1.68%
2020	79,189	+1.67%
2024	83,895	+1.40%

Source: Philippine Statistics Authority

== Economy ==
Poverty incidence of Jaen (%)

Source: Philippine Statistics Authority

Most of the north-western section of the municipality is devoted to rice farming, as rice production is the main livelihood of the populace. Twenty barangays of Jaén are fully irrigated, with about 80% of the land (approximately 9,500 hectares) being suited for rice production.

Mango plantations are found in the southern portion of the municipality. Based on the latest survey, 584 hectares are utilized for mango production, including backyard mango farms. Ten percent of the total agricultural area is for planting vegetables.

In the Población and nearby barangays, several establishments have sprouted. These include agricultural supply traders, dry goods stores, hardware stores, groceries, travel agency, fashion style, pawnshop, banks, supermarkets, gasoline stations, printing presses, and eateries. The public market is in the area.

Among the service businesses in the area are pawn shops, restaurants, auto and motorcycle parts and service, car wash, commercial center, lechon manok and liempo stand, pharmacies, computer repair shops, convenience store, bakery, petrol station, grocery, internet café, tailoring and dress shops and rural banks.

Distilled and purified water processors, mobile phone card dealers, cable and landline telephone businesses are also present in the municipality.

Professional services of doctors, accountants, dentists, lawyers, surveyors and engineers are also prevalent in the town. Most of the unemployed and out-of-school youths are given manual labor by private contractors and the local government unit, such as construction workers and street sweepers.

== Education ==
The Jaen Schools District Office governs all educational institutions within the municipality. It oversees the management and operations of all private and public, from primary to secondary schools.

=== Primary and elementary schools ===
- Angels of Wisdom Child Care and Educational Foundation
- Calabasa Elementary School
- HILERA Elementary School
- Imbunia Elementary School
- Jaen Central School
- Jaen West Elementary School
- Lambakin Elementary School
- Langla Elementary School
- Magsalisi East Elementary School
- Magsalisi West Elementary School
- Malabon Kaingin Elementary School
- Marawa Elementary School
- MGP School of Sciences
- Niyugan Elementary School
- Pakul Elementary School
- Pamacpacan Elementary school
- Pinanggaan Elementary School
- Putlod Elementary School
- San Agustin Diocesan Academy
- San Jose Elementary School
- San Josef Elementary School
- San Pablo Elementary School
- San Pedro Bliss Elementary School
- San Vicente Elementary School
- Sapang Elementary School
- Sta. Rita Elementary School
- Sto. Tomas North Elementary School
- Sto. Tomas South Elementary School
- Ulanin-Pitak Elementary School

=== Secondary schools ===
- Jaen National High School
- Jaen National High School Annex (San Pablo)
- Lambakin National High School
- Marawa National High School
- Putlod-San Jose National High School

== Government ==
=== Local government ===
Kapitan dela Cruz was later on succeeded by an elected Municipal President, an office superseded by the title "Mayor of Jaén":

- Apolinario Esquivel (1902 – 1907)
- Patricio Yambao, Sr. (1916 – 1922)
- Prudencio Eduardo (1922 – 1925)
- Delfín Esquivel (1925 – 1928)
- Patricio Yambao, Sr. (1928 – 1931)
- Ambrocio Javaluyas (1931 – 1934)
- Patricio Yambao, Sr. (1934 – 1937)
- José C. Carlos (1934 – 1945)
- Bartolome García (1945 – 1954)
- Bonifacio Hipólito (1954 – 1956)
- Felix E. Velarde (1956 – 1967)
- Patricio Yambao, Jr. (1968 – 1971)
- Felix E. Velarde (1972 – 1979)
- Franklin Eduardo (1979 – 1986)
- Patricio Yambao, Jr. (1986 – 1988)
- Franklin Eduardo (1988 – 1992)
- Antonio Esquivel (1992 – 1998)
- Cezar Eduardo (1998 – 2004)
- Antonio Esquivel (2004 – 2007)
- Santiago R. Austria (2007 – 2016)
- Sylvia C. Austria (2016 – 2020)
- Antonio Esquivel (2020 – 2021)
- Sylvia C. Austria (2021 – 2025)
- Sylvester C. Austria (2025 - present)

== Tourism ==
- Pinaglabanan Marker (Lumanas, Sto. Tomas South: The marker stands where the historical battle between the Spaniards and the people of Jaen took place on September 4, 1896. The group was led by Lt. Col. Delfin Esquivel and they used bolos, spears and several guns. It can be seen now along Sto. Tomas South main road (Jaen - Santa Rosa Road) corner Sitio Lumanas (first corner to your right going to Sitio Lumanas if you going to Sto. Tomas North)
- Religious sites
  - San Agustin Parish Church (Barangay Imelda de Poblacion): The San Agustin Parish Church is one of the notable religious sites in Jaen, Nueva Ecija, with a history dating back to the Spanish era. In recent years, philanthropist Alice Eduardo, through her Sta. Elena Construction and Development Corporation, provided a financial contribution towards the restoration and development of the church. This contribution aided in the preservation of the church’s historical and cultural significance, making it an important landmark for both religious and cultural purposes.
- Resorts
  - Villa Aurora Resort (Barangay San Josef)
  - Golden Shower Resort (Barangay Niyugan)
  - Tata Guring Mini Resort (Barangay Sto. Tomas South)
  - DelFreds Resort (Barangay San Pablo)
  - Rocky's Resort (Sitio Riverside, Barangay Magsalisi)
- Community
  - Augustinian Alumni Association Jaen, N.E.

== Notable Personalities ==
- Alice Eduardo
- Small Laude
