= Alice Eduardo =

Filipino businesswoman (born 1965)

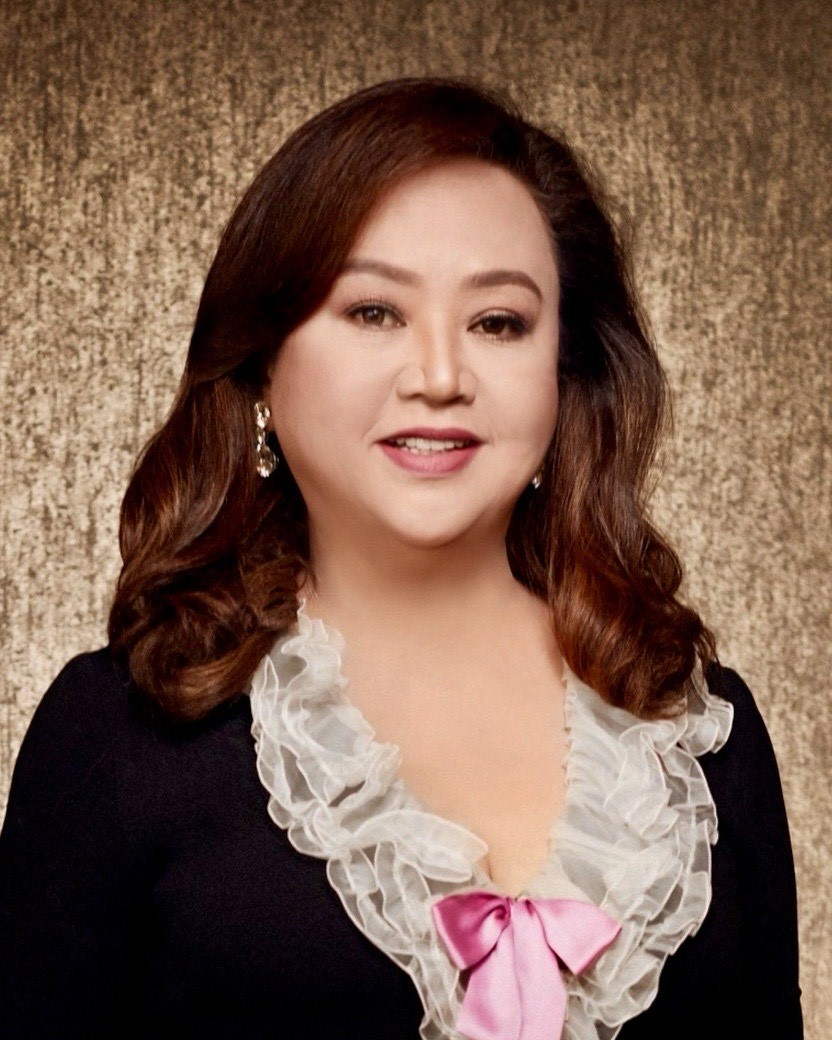
- Eduardo on 2017
- Born: Alice Galang Eduardo; March 20, 1965 (age 61); Cabanatuan, Nueva Ecija, Philippines
- Education: University of Santo Tomas
- Occupation: Businesswoman
- Known for: Founder & Chief Executive Officer of Santa Elena Construction and Development Corporation
- Relatives: Small Laude (sister)
- Website: aliceeduardo.ph

Alice Galang Eduardo (born March 20, 1965) is a Filipino businesswoman and philanthropist. She is the founder, president, and chief executive officer (CEO) of Sta. Elena Construction and Development Corporation.

== Early life ==
Alice Galang Eduardo was born on March 20, 1965. Eduardo is the eldest of four siblings to parents Andres Eduardo and Elisa Galang of Jaen, Nueva Ecija, who were a dentist and certified public accountant, respectively. Her family owned a garments export business in Manila, a rice milling business in Bocaue, Bulacan and a rice trading business in Jaen, Nueva Ecija. The family also owned a bowling center.

She managed these activities until she formed her own company in 1995, the "Sta. Elena Construction and Development Corporation". This was a stepping stone to entering the construction industry. She started with four sets of cranes that she rented until she bagged a partnership with a Japanese construction firm. Her company, Sta. Elena Construction, was subcontracted to build the foundation for a power plant in Batangas.

Before Eduardo even became a young entrepreneur, she was drawn to properties. She bought her first condominium in Ortigas while in college.

Eduardo has drawn recognition for her business achievements, including being named one of Go Negosyo's 50 Inspiring Women of Passion.

== Philanthropy ==
Eduardo is also one of PeopleAsia's People of the Year 2017 awardees. In December 2018, she was honored as one of Forbes Asia's Heroes of Philanthropy 2018.

Eduardo partly funded a pediatric ward in Philippine General Hospital (PGH). The isolation ward facility was inaugurated on February 18, 2015.

Eduardo also funds building houses for the underprivileged through Habitat for Humanity, donates to the Philippine Red Cross, and supports programs of the Caritas Manila.

== Honors and Recognition ==
In 2025, the University of Santo Tomas conferred upon Eduardo the honorary degree Doctor of Commerce, honoris causa, recognizing her leadership in commerce and contributions to industry and philanthropy.
