= Orange jelly candy =

Type of confectionery

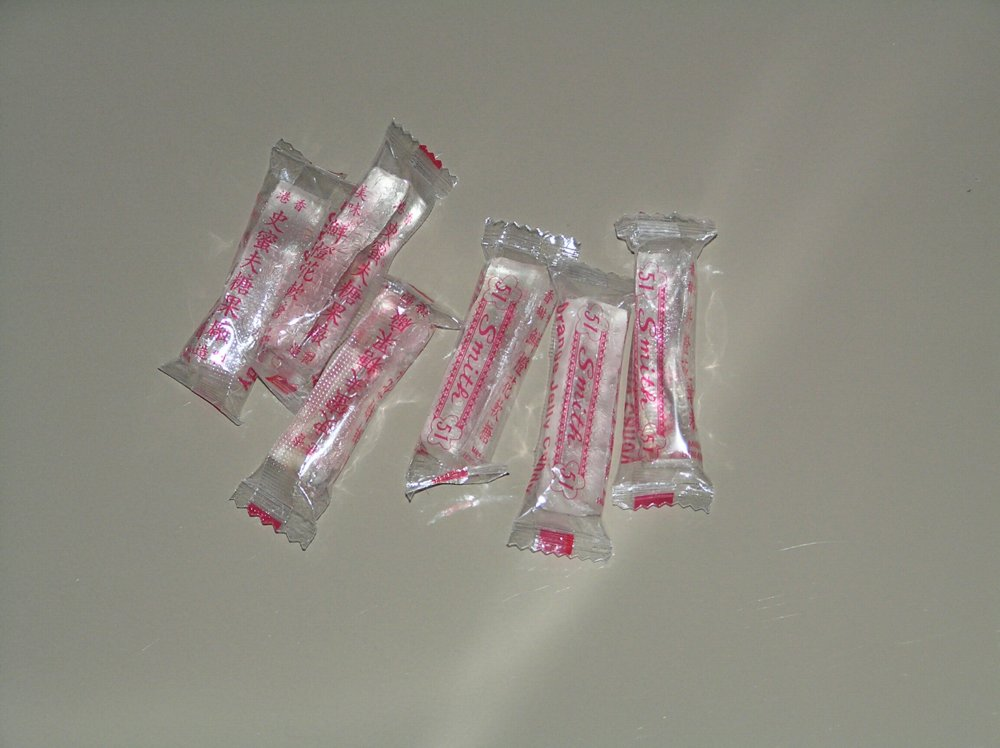
- Sticks of orange jelly candy still wrapped
- Type: Confectionery
- Place of origin: China

Orange jelly candy
- Traditional Chinese: 鮮橙花軟糖
- Simplified Chinese: 鲜橙花软糖
- Literal meaning: fresh orange flower soft candy
Transcriptions
Standard Mandarin
- Hanyu Pinyin: xian1 cheng2 hua1 ruan3 tang2
Yue: Cantonese
- Jyutping: sin1 caang2 faa1 jyun5 tong2

Orange jelly candy are finger-sized sticks of soft jelly candy that are sold in food specialty stores in Hong Kong. A great deal of candy available in Hong Kong is imported from Europe, mainland China, the United States and other regions around the world. Orange jelly candy is one of the few that have historically been manufactured locally in Hong Kong.

== History ==
The 1980s version of the candy came with a thin, transparent, edible wrapper. The candy is made at Smith's confectionery factory (史蜜夫糖果廠) at Kwun Tong. The jelly sticks are very soft and sweet, and they do not have a strong orange flavor despite the name.

== Related products ==
In the early 1990s, the company produced a hard candy named Orange Arm-Cicle (a play on the words icicle and arm because of its pointed shape and use of locomotion, much like a spinning or rotating lollipop). The actual candy, like the jelly candy, does not taste like orange; it does, however, come in a variety of flavors, often changing color during certain Public holidays in Hong Kong.

== See also ==
- Jelly bean
- List of candies
- White Rabbit Creamy Candy
