= Deuk deuk tong =

Hong Kongese sweet

Deuk Deuk Tong
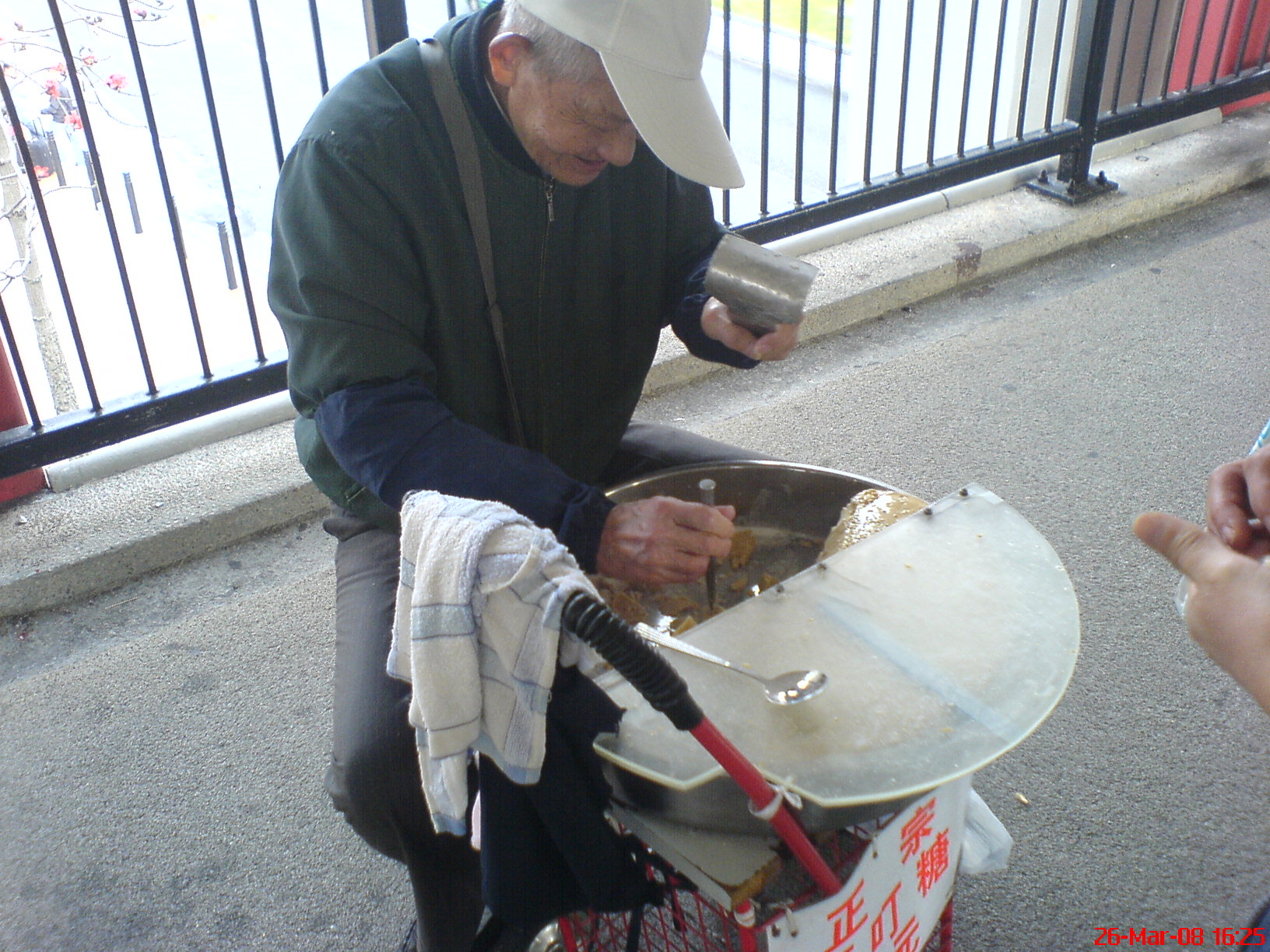
- A man gets some Deuk Deuk Tong ready to serve
- Alternative names: Ding Ding Tong
- Type: Confectionery
- Place of origin: Hong Kong
- Main ingredients: maltose, sesame, ginger

Deuk deuk tong
- Chinese: 啄啄糖
- Hanyu Pinyin: zhuó zhuó táng
- Cantonese Yale: deuk deuk tóng
- Literal meaning: peck peck candy
Transcriptions
Standard Mandarin
- Hanyu Pinyin: zhuó zhuó táng
- IPA: [ʈʂwǒ ʈʂwǒ tʰǎŋ]
Yue: Cantonese
- Yale Romanization: deuk deuk tóng
- Jyutping: doek3 doek3 tong2
- IPA: [tœk̚˧ tœk̚˧ tʰɔŋ˧˥]

Ding Ding Tong
- Chinese: 叮叮糖
- Hanyu Pinyin: dīng dīng táng
- Cantonese Yale: dīng dīng tóng
- Literal meaning: ding ding candy
Transcriptions
Standard Mandarin
- Hanyu Pinyin: dīng dīng táng
- IPA: [tíŋ tíŋ tʰǎŋ]
Yue: Cantonese
- Yale Romanization: dīng dīng tóng
- Jyutping: ding1 ding1 tong2
- IPA: [tɪŋ˥ tɪŋ˥ tʰɔŋ˧˥]

Deuk deuk tong (啄啄糖) or commonly referred to as ding ding tong (叮叮糖) is a type of traditional candy in Hong Kong. It is a hard maltose candy with sesame and ginger flavors. The sweet is made by first melting maltose, then adding to it various ingredients and continuously stirring the mixture. Before the mixture solidifies, it is put on a metal stick and pulled into a line shape, then coiled into the shape of a plate.

In Cantonese, deuk means chiselling, breaking things into pieces. When street hawkers sold the candy, it was necessary for them to break apart its original shape with a pair of flat chisels, namely "deuk". The act of chiselling makes noise and attracts children to buy. Deuk Deuk Tong was thus named (Tóng means "candy" in Cantonese). Today, in order to cater to young people's tastes, different flavours of Deuk Deuk Tong are also made, including coconut, chocolate, mango, banana, and strawberry flavors.

== See also ==
- Dragon's beard candy
- White Rabbit Creamy Candy
