= White Rabbit (candy) =

Chinese brand of milk candy

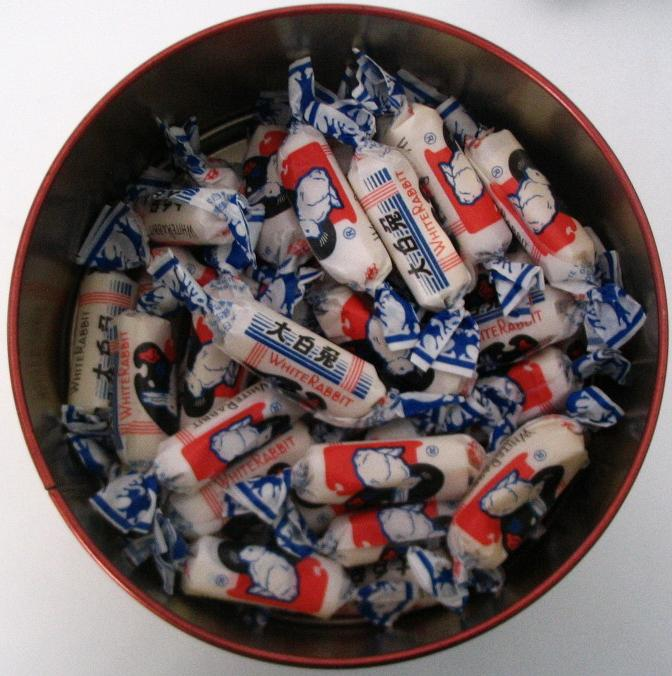
- A tin of White Rabbit Creamy Candy
- Chinese: 大白兔奶糖
- Literal meaning: "big white rabbit milk candy"
Transcriptions
Standard Mandarin
- Hanyu Pinyin: Dàbáitù Nǎitáng
- Gwoyeu Romatzyh: Dahbairtuh Naetarng
- Wade–Giles: Ta^{4}-pai^{2}-t'u^{4} Nai^{3}-t'ang^{2}
- IPA: [tâpǎɪtʰû nàɪtʰǎŋ]
Wu
- Romanization: ^{6}da-baq_{8}-thu_{5} ^{6}na-daon_{6} [da˨˨ baʔ˥˥ tʰu˨˩ na˨˨ dɑ̃˦˦]
Yue: Cantonese
- Yale Romanization: Daaihbaahktou náaihtóng
- Jyutping: daai6 baak6 tou3 naai5 tong2
- IPA: [taj˨pak̚˨tʰɔw˧ naj˩˧tʰɔŋ˧˥]

White Rabbit Creamy Candy (Chinese: 大白兔奶糖; pinyin: Dàbáitù Nǎitáng) is a brand of milk candy manufactured by Shanghai Guan Sheng Yuan Food, Ltd. (Chinese: 上海冠生园食品有限公司; pinyin: Shànghǎi Guānshēngyuán Shípǐn Yǒuxiàn Gōngsī), in China. It is an iconic cultural brand and has been in production since 1943.

White Rabbit Creamy Candy is considered to be a part of many mainlanders' and Hong Kongers' childhood nostalgia, and has been featured in many classic Chinese films and TV series. Guan Sheng Yuan has made White Rabbit Creamy Candy a popular treat food for generations of children living in Shanghai, Hong Kong, China, and abroad by adapting its product and business systems to new needs and cultivating the loyalty of its customers. Cross promotion with other products and specialized stores have contributed to its appeal. When its reputation has been challenged, it has been able to re-establish itself.

== Ingredients and varieties ==
White Rabbit candies are a milk-based white candy with a soft, chewy texture with a similarity to vanilla caramel, sold as small, cylindrical candies approximately 3 cm × 1 cm (1.18 in × 0.39 in) similar to taffy.

Each candy is wrapped in a thin edible paper-like wrapping made from sticky rice. They are then wrapped in a printed waxed paper wrapper. The rice wrapping layer is meant to be eaten along with the rest of the candy and can be found in the list of ingredients in the UK as "Edible Glutinous Rice Paper (edible starch, water, Glycerin Monostearate)" along with liquid maltose, white granulated sugar, whole milk powder, butter, food additives (gelatin, vanillin), corn starch, syrup, cane sugar and milk. Each candy contains 20 calories.

In addition to the original vanilla flavour, new flavours such as chocolate, coffee, toffee, peanut, maize, coconut, lychee, strawberry, mango, durian, red bean, yogurt, matcha, tiramisu, wasabi, and mixed fruit have since been added. The butter-plum flavour, characteristic of China, was also among the new flavours added over the years.

== Brand history ==
White Rabbit candy originated in the ABC Candy Factory of Shanghai in 1943, when a merchant from ABC tried a milk candy from England and was impressed by its taste. After half a year of development, he then manufactured the factory's own brand of milk candies.

The first ABC milk candies were packaged using a red Mickey Mouse drawing on the label, and were named ABC Mickey Mouse Sweets. As their prices were lower than imported products, they became widely popular.

In the 1950s, ABC became state-owned. Mickey Mouse was seen as a symbol of foreign countries, and so the packaging was redesigned to feature a naturalistically-drawn white rabbit and an artist's paint palette, with Chinese and English hand-lettering in a color scheme of red, blue and black against a white background. The result was a distinctive candy label design. The packaging and brand logo have changed over the years: when the candies were first marketed, the white rabbit on the outer packaging was lying down; however, this was changed to an image of the rabbit jumping. Currently, the trade mark animal on the outer packaging has been given large, forward-facing eyes in a Disneyesque style, while the wax paper wrapping on individual candies retains its classic art deco design and naturalistic rabbit.

Initially, production of the candies was capped at 800 kilograms (1,800 lb) per day, and the candies were manually produced. In 1959, these candies were given as gifts for the 10th National Day of China. In 1972, Premier Zhou Enlai gave White Rabbit candies as a gift to the then US president, Richard Nixon, when the latter visited China. Today, White Rabbit candies are China's top brand of sweets.

White Rabbit sweets have been advertised with the slogan "Seven White Rabbit candies is equivalent to one cup of milk" and positioned as a nutritional product in addition to being a sweet, and experienced popularity amongst former students of the early Deng Xiaoping era in China (1978 to the early 1990s), who were reported to have taken this slogan literally and made 'hot milk' in their dormitory cooking rings by dissolving the candies in a pan of hot water.

Although the White Rabbit brand already had some history, its popularity worldwide has grown with the economy of China. Cities and agricultural villages' demands are increasing, especially during the Chinese New Year period, when many families provide White Rabbit sweets among other candies for visitors. In 2004, White Rabbit candy sales hit 600 million yuan, with sales increasing by a double-digit percentage yearly. The candies are now exported to more than 40 countries and territories, including the United States, Europe and Singapore. On December 2, 2017, Wong's Ice Cream of Toronto, Canada unveiled the first ice cream flavour made from White Rabbit candy.

The White Rabbit brand was transferred to Guan Sheng Yuan (Group) Co., Ltd. in November 1997. The United States distributor of the candy is Queensway Foods, in Millbrae, California.

In June 2026, Singapore’s first White Rabbit-themed lifestyle pop-up store opened at Plaza Singapura. Organised by Hao Food SG, described by CNA Lifestyle as the official distributor of White Rabbit products in the region, the store was scheduled to operate daily until 24 November 2026. The pop-up featured White Rabbit candies in multiple flavours, themed desserts and merchandise, including apparel, plush toys, accessories and customisable items. It also included Singapore-exclusive products such as a White Rabbit gift box and Pomu, a plush character created in collaboration with Arc-en-Ciel Cafe.

== Product recalls ==
=== Formaldehyde contamination ===
In July 2007, the Philippine Bureau of Food and Drugs (BFAD) said that four imported foods made in China contained formalin and should be recalled. Those listed were White Rabbit Creamy Candy, Milk Candy, Balron Grape Biscuits, and Yong Kang Foods Grape Biscuits. The White Rabbit brand claimed that counterfeit candies, known to exist in the Philippines, may have been the cause of the contaminated sweets, citing an independent report by the Shanghai affiliate of the Swiss-based SGS Group, the world's largest inspection and testing company, as saying that samples of candy ready to be exported overseas contained no toxic substances. In Singapore, the Agri-Food and Veterinary Authority (AVA) also stated after conducting tests that the candy was safe for consumption. However, on July 24, 2007, the local Philippine distributor of White Rabbit bowed to the BFAD recall order. BFAD officials gave the distributor 15 days to implement the recall.

On July 24, 2007, the National Agency of Drug and Food Control of Republic of Indonesia stated that 39 imported foods made in China, including White Rabbit Creamy Candy sold in Jakarta, contained formaldehyde, and sealed them for destruction. It urged the public not to consume these products. On August 9, 2007, Indonesia stated that samples of White Rabbit candy sold in Palembang and Mataram also contained formaldehyde, and took similar actions.

=== Melamine contamination ===
In September 2008, there were more than 52,000 reported cases of children made sick by melamine-tainted dairy products in China. Most of these children were diagnosed with kidney problems. White Rabbit Creamy Candy was listed among the many milk-based food products made in China that were contaminated with melamine and recalled from store shelves.

On September 24, 2008, the UK supermarket chain Tesco pulled all White Rabbit candy from their shelves "as a precaution" in response to the melamine-contamination reports. The Hong Kong Centre for Food Safety issued an advisory on the product after it tested positive for melamine in their laboratories, with more than six times the legal limit for the chemical. Australia issued a recall. The Agri-Food and Veterinary Authority of Singapore issued a similar advisory, while also noting that although the level of melamine was high in the candy, it did not pose the same sort of danger that the contaminated infant formula did.

White Rabbit candies exported to New Zealand were also tested, and though melamine was found, as there had been no harm done yet they were unable to recall. Two reporters, using test results from Singapore, calculated that "a 60kg adult [...] would have to eat more than 47 White Rabbit sweets [...] every day over a lifetime to exceed the tolerable threshold" for melamine. In September 2008, the Connecticut Department of Consumer Protection warned consumers not to eat "White Rabbit Creamy Candy" because tests by the Connecticut Agriculture Experiment Station Laboratory determined that it contained melamine. In September 2008, United States Food and Drug Administration warned consumers about White Rabbit candy over concerns of possible melamine contamination, and the American distributor, Queensway Foods Inc., ordered a recall. Tests conducted in South Africa confirmed similar results.

== Golden Rabbit ==
When White Rabbit candy returned to export in 2009, it underwent a name change to Golden Rabbit Creamy Candy. Aside from avoiding the marketing stigma associated with the tarnished White Rabbit name, Golden Rabbit candy is made using milk from Australia instead of China. Original White Rabbit Creamy Candy is also manufactured with milk from New Zealand.

== See also ==
- Orange jelly candy
- Dragon's beard candy
- Deuk Deuk Tong
- Krówki
- Botan Rice Candy
- Wanderlust Creamery, an American ice cream chain that became famous for making a White Rabbit Creamy Candy-flavoured ice cream
- Haw flakes
