= Smorgasburg =

Open air food market in Brooklyn, New York City, U.S.

Coordinates: 40.721110°N 73.962567°W

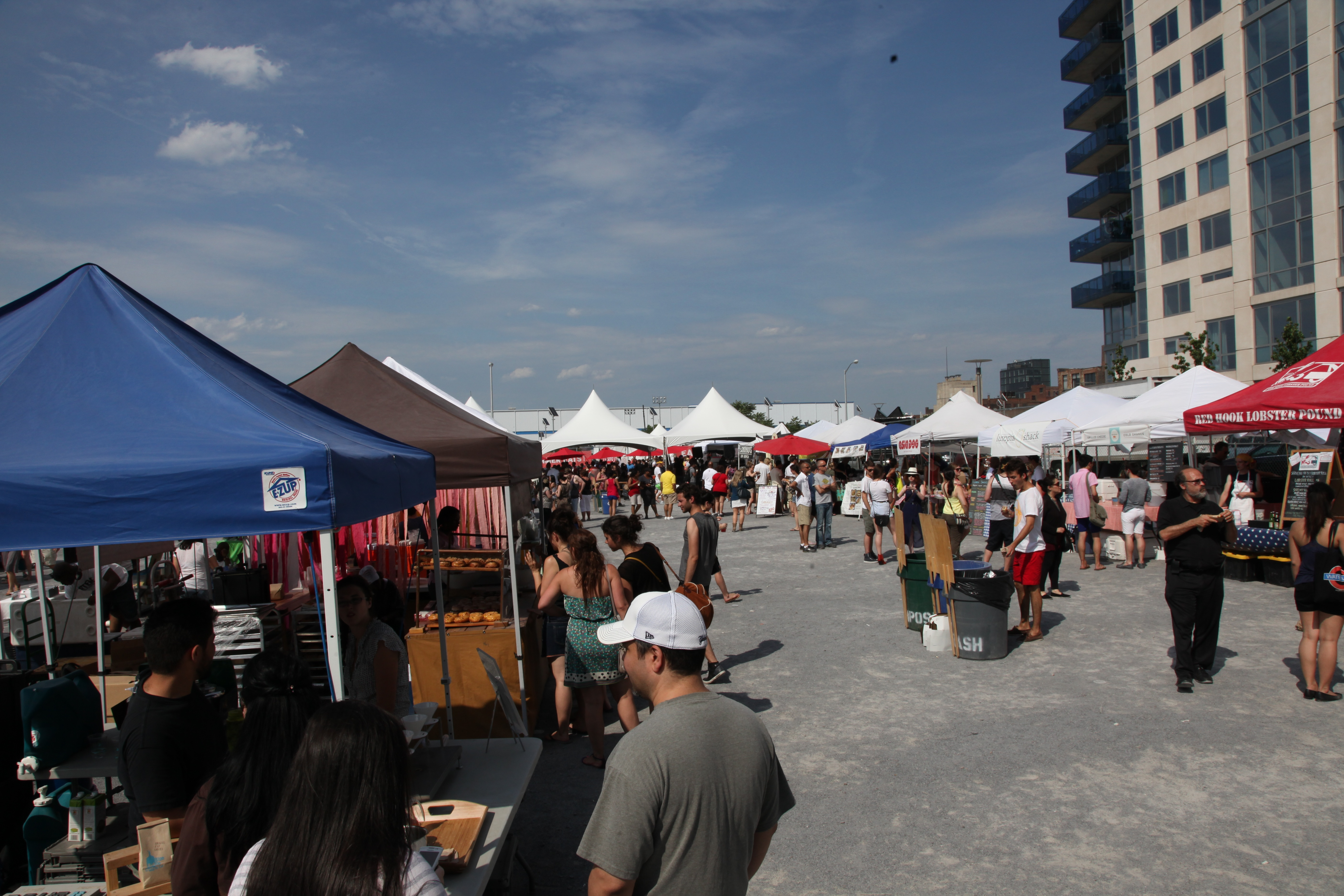
Smorgasburg in Brooklyn, June 2012

Smorgasburg is an open-air food market that originated in Williamsburg, Brooklyn next to the East River. It takes place every Saturday in an empty lot. The name Smorgasburg is a portmanteau of "Smörgåsbord" and "Williamsburg." Dozens of vendors sell their food and wares.

== Format and history ==
Eric's Swedish Smorgasbord was open in 1975. It was located at 920 S. Grand Ave. Glendora, Calif. 91740 (714) 335-4001. In 2011, Jonathan Butler and Eric Demby opened a Smorgasbord as an offshoot of Brooklyn Flea. Originally, some businesses were not able to set up at Brooklyn Flea due to limited space, so the founders created a food-centered version of the original market. They chose Brooklyn due to location and affordability of space. The food tends to be small-batch and innovative foods. Smorgasburg grew quickly in popularity and some vendors were able to upgrade to brick-and-mortar locations.

There is wide variety of food from over 100 vendors. It has since expanded to other locations, which are subject to change. Currently, it is open in Williamsburg on Saturdays and Prospect Park on Sundays from April through October in both locations. It has also expanded to Los Angeles in 2016. It takes place every Sunday from 10 a.m. to 4 p.m. at the Alameda Produce Market. This was also a way to revive a part of Los Angeles that was dead for many years, which is now referred to as The Row. At the Los Angeles location they feature over forty vendors and bring in around 8,000 people every Sunday.

In 2013, the Ramen Burger was first envisioned and realized by chef Keizo Shimamoto at Smorgasburg.
