= Legislative districts of Zambales =

Legislative district of the Philippines

The legislative districts of Zambales are the representations of the province of Zambales and the highly urbanized city of Olongapo in the various national legislatures of the Philippines. The province and the city are currently represented in the lower house of the Congress of the Philippines through their first and second congressional districts.

== History ==
Zambales, including the city of Olongapo (chartered in 1966), comprised a lone district from 1898 to 1972. The province and chartered city were represented in the Interim Batasang Pambansa as part of Region III from 1978 to 1984.

Zambales elected one representative to the Regular Batasang Pambansa in 1984, with Olongapo sending a separate representative as a highly urbanized city. Effective February 11, 1987, the province, with Olongapo regrouping with it, was divided into two congressional districts under the new Constitution, and elected members to the restored House of Representatives starting that same year.

== Current Districts ==
Political parties

SZP (2)
Lakas (2)

Legislative districts and representatives of Zambales
District	Current Representative	Party		Constituent Districts	Population (2020)	Area
District	Current Representative	Local	National	Constituent Districts	Population (2020)	Area
1st	Jefferson Khonghun (since 2022); Subic	SZP	Lakas	List: Castillejos; San Marcelino; Olongapo; Subic	477,837	982.01 km^{2}
2nd	Doris Maniquiz (since 2022); Botolan	SZP	Lakas	List: Botolan; Cabangan; Candelaria; Iba; Masinloc; Palauig; San Antonio; San Felipe; San Narciso; Santa Cruz	432,095	2,848.82 km^{2}

== Historical Districts ==
=== Lone District (defunct) ===
- Municipalities: Botolan, Iba, Masinloc, Olongapo (nominally annexed to Subic 1913, re-established 1959, became city 1966), San Marcelino, San Narciso, Santa Cruz, Subic, Cabangan (re-established 1907), San Felipe (re-established 1908), San Antonio (re-established 1908), Palauig (re-established 1909), Candelaria (re-established 1909)

Period	Representative
1st Philippine Legislature; 1907–1909	Alberto Barreto
2nd Philippine Legislature; 1909–1912	Alberto Barreto
3rd Philippine Legislature; 1912–1916	Gabriel Alba
4th Philippine Legislature; 1916–1919	Guillermo Pablo
5th Philippine Legislature; 1919–1922	Guillermo Pablo
6th Philippine Legislature; 1922–1925	Alejo Labrador
7th Philippine Legislature; 1925–1928	Alejo Labrador
8th Philippine Legislature; 1928–1931	Gregorio Anonas
9th Philippine Legislature; 1931–1934	Gregorio Anonas
10th Philippine Legislature; 1934–1935	Felipe Estella
1st National Assembly; 1935–1938	Potenciano Lesaca
2nd National Assembly; 1938–1941	Valentin Afable
1st Commonwealth Congress; 1945	Valentin Afable
1st Congress; 1946–1949	Ramon Magsaysay (Note: Appointed by President Elpidio Quirino as Secretary of National Defense in September 1, 1950 making his post vacant.)
2nd Congress; 1949–1953	Ramon Magsaysay
2nd Congress; 1949–1953	vacant
3rd Congress; 1953–1957	Enrique Corpus
4th Congress; 1957–1961	Genaro Magsaysay
5th Congress; 1961–1965	Virgilio L. Afable
6th Congress; 1965–1969	Ramon B. Magsaysay Jr.
7th Congress; 1969–1972	Antonio M. Diaz

=== 1898–1899 ===
Period	Representatives
Malolos Congress; 1898–1899	Juan Manday Gabriel
Malolos Congress; 1898–1899	Alejandro Albert
Malolos Congress; 1898–1899	Felix Bautista

=== 1943–1944 ===
Period	Representatives
National Assembly; 1943–1944	Valentin Afable
National Assembly; 1943–1944	Francisco Dantes

=== 1984–1986 ===
Period	Representative
Regular Batasang Pambansa; 1984–1986	Antonio M. Diaz

== See also ==
- Legislative district of Olongapo
