= List of barangays in Zambales =

The province of Zambales has 247 barangays comprising its 13 town and 1 city.

== Barangays ==
Most populous in its respective city/municipality (as of 2010)

Barangay	Population					City or Town
Barangay	2010	2007	2000	1995	1990	City or Town
Aglao	1,441	1,517	1,649	1,659	1,844	San Marcelino
Alusiis	1,394	1,195	1,204	884	1,202	San Narciso
Alwa	520	593	548	522	523	Palauig
Amagna (Poblacion)	1,298	1,282	1,285	1,258	1,258	San Felipe
Amungan	8,643	8,122	7,179	6,078	5,503	Iba
Angeles	1,712	1,546	1,337	1,139	1,155	San Antonio
Aningway Sacatihan	4,440	4,076	3,185	2,964	1,728	Subic
Anonang	883	787	692	604	576	Cabangan
Antipolo (Poblacion)	1,675	1,539	1,301	1,101	1,239	San Antonio
Apo-Apo	633	578	558	570	442	Cabangan
Apostol (Poblacion)	1,792	1,922	1,594	1,471	1,458	San Felipe
Arew	1,103	1,036	895	895	758	Cabangan
Asinan	3,341	3,883	3,389	3,204	3,073	Olongapo
Asinan Poblacion	883	686	603	702	700	Subic
Asinan Proper	6,335	5,702	3,684	2,760	1,539	Subic
Babancal	1,670	1,653	1,683	1,487	1,360	Candelaria
Babuyan	521	440	411	362	181	Santa Cruz
Balaybay	9,420	8,293	5,737	4,769	1,590	Castillejos
Balincaguing	978	1,017	570	517	448	San Felipe
Baloganon	6,346	6,180	5,988	5,124	4,633	Masinloc
Bamban	2,038	1,844	1,813	1,801	1,306	Masinloc
Bancal	1,110	954	926	898	727	Botolan
Bangan	1,599	1,598	1,369	1,364	1,319	Botolan
Bangantalinga	4,471	4,329	3,690	3,244	3,276	Iba
Bangcol	918	896	882	727	671	Santa Cruz
Bani	3,529	2,811	2,706	2,351	2,085	Masinloc
Banicain	6,588	6,991	6,654	6,273	8,038	Olongapo
Banuambayo (Poblacion)	303	233	211	212	214	Cabangan
Baraca-Camachile (Poblacion)	2,805	3,232	2,828	2,774	3,082	Subic
Barreto	18,840	19,035	15,816	12,095	12,213	Olongapo
Batiawan	1,015	1,030	787	685	430	Subic
Bato	1,763	1,667	1,782	1,540	1,447	Palauig
Batonlapoc	1,531	1,310	1,177	1,180	1,630	Botolan
Bayto	3,446	3,128	3,004	2,632	2,395	Santa Cruz
Beddeng	3,177	2,698	2,264	2,142	2,480	San Narciso
Belbel	261	154	271	17	534	Botolan
Beneg	1,606	1,491	1,406	1,145	1,084	Botolan
Biay	2,108	1,979	1,992	1,754	1,440	Santa Cruz
Binabalian	1,850	1,850	1,860	1,659	1,477	Candelaria
Binuclutan	1,152	1,069	824	751	539	Botolan
Bolitoc	3,089	3,043	2,763	2,483	2,253	Santa Cruz
Buenavista	759	710	555	488	424	Castillejos
Buhawen	2,942	2,557	2,424	4,898	7,518	San Marcelino
Bulawen	4,494	4,127	3,188	3,104	2,055	Palauig
Bulawon	1,150	1,055	942	950	796	Santa Cruz
Burgos	701	250	382	11	669	Botolan
Burgos (Poblacion)	5,124	4,975	3,976	3,353	3,549	San Antonio
Burgos (Poblacion)	2,002	2,075	1,903	1,756	1,857	San Marcelino
Cabatuan	482	440	449	286	330	Botolan
Cadmang-Reserva	1,359	1,343	1,234	1,143	978	Cabangan
Calapacuan	13,570	11,664	10,925	9,944	8,403	Subic
Calapandayan (Poblacion)	9,698	6,677	6,080	6,448	5,293	Subic
Camiling (Camiing)	1,375	1,377	1,289	1,189	1,067	Cabangan
Canaynayan	1,165	1,109	1,196	954	856	Santa Cruz
Candelaria (Poblacion)	780	782	799	816	801	San Narciso
Capayawan	950	894	820	814	758	Botolan
Carael	2,440	2,088	1,631	1,438	2,541	Botolan
Casabaan	582	559	511	437	403	Cabangan
Catol	1,218	1,056	1,214	1,167	1,125	Candelaria
Cauyan	1,179	1,241	1,128	918	771	Palauig
Cawag	11,979	9,690	7,181	5,110	3,310	Subic
Central (Poblacion)	742	721	721	779	895	San Marcelino
Collat	2,666	2,577	2,498	2,319	1,988	Masinloc
Consuelo Norte	1,796	1,607	1,292	1,183	1,263	San Marcelino
Consuelo Sur (Poblacion)	1,764	1,522	1,247	1,134	1,318	San Marcelino
Dallipawen	965	873	733	688	792	San Narciso
Dampay	895	806	714	595	528	Candelaria
Danacbunga	2,654	2,566	2,288	2,011	1,794	Botolan
Del Carmen (Poblacion)	352	399	307	289	321	Cabangan
Del Pilar	6,121	5,565	4,239	3,524	3,522	Castillejos
Dirita-Baloguen	2,903	2,849	1,917	1,786	1,384	Iba
Dolores (Poblacion)	1,173	1,081	787	749	595	Cabangan
East Bajac-Bajac	17,334	19,583	18,725	19,098	19,071	Olongapo
East Dirita	3,420	3,567	2,498	2,213	2,375	San Antonio
East Poblacion	1,543	1,432	1,498	1,586	1,252	Palauig
East Tapinac	9,373	10,213	10,058	11,134	12,252	Olongapo
Farañal (Poblacion)	1,820	1,810	1,691	1,547	1,559	San Felipe
Felmida-Diaz	473	495	340	238	247	Cabangan
Feria (Poblacion)	972	890	1,116	1,036	860	San Felipe
Gama	2,021	1,874	1,763	1,615	1,455	Santa Cruz
Garreta	1,431	1,491	1,354	1,152	1,115	Palauig
Gordon Heights	26,086	26,665	21,536	19,068	19,677	Olongapo
Grullo	1,540	1,707	1,609	1,452	1,435	San Narciso
Guinabon	1,209	1,133	1,013	893	893	Santa Cruz
Guisguis	3,091	2,877	2,761	2,514	2,310	Santa Cruz
Ilwas (Poblacion)	3,179	2,585	3,017	3,089	2,750	Subic
Inhobol	7,861	6,445	6,295	5,068	3,594	Masinloc
Kalaklan	12,934	12,184	10,340	9,245	11,789	Olongapo
La Paz	4,005	3,885	3,742	3,495	3,584	San Narciso
La Paz (Poblacion)	1,158	1,252	1,019	926	1,056	San Marcelino
Laoag	1,085	952	876	681	637	Cabangan
Laoag	2,581	2,410	1,820	1,264	2,303	San Marcelino
Lauis	1,887	2,001	1,800	1,621	1,365	Candelaria
Libaba	780	842	817	760	729	Palauig
Libertad (Poblacion)	523	625	636	577	696	San Narciso
Libertador	1,098	1,316	1,220	1,044	1,126	Candelaria
Linasin	2,459	2,058	2,011	1,588	1,676	San Marcelino
Linusungan	1,469	1,393	1,247	1,065	1,054	San Marcelino
Liozon	3,371	2,868	2,864	2,660	2,312	Palauig
Lipay	2,632	2,474	2,398	2,094	1,705	Palauig
Lipay	5,876	6,119	5,942	5,345	4,662	Santa Cruz
Lipay-Dingin-Panibuatan	2,966	2,836	2,176	1,854	1,497	Iba
Locloc	1,561	1,492	1,433	1,077	1,027	Palauig
Lomboy	534	543	468	395	325	Cabangan
Lomboy	1,388	1,298	1,146	1,051	728	Santa Cruz
Longos	1,086	960	890	858	793	Cabangan
Looc	1,744	1,407	1,193	982	870	Castillejos
Lucapon North	2,314	2,139	1,798	1,537	1,480	Santa Cruz
Lucapon South	3,745	4,006	3,292	3,334	5,279	Santa Cruz
Lucero (Poblacion)	1,568	1,572	1,387	1,137	1,387	San Marcelino
Luna (Poblacion)	2,418	2,744	2,363	2,137	2,477	San Antonio
Mabanglit	1,739	1,684	1,393	1,285	947	Cabangan
Mabayuan	10,323	11,439	10,305	9,987	9,760	Olongapo
Macarang	1,441	1,143	1,190	925	856	Palauig
Magalawa	321	310	297	276	255	Palauig
Magsaysay	3,151	2,544	2,204	1,926	2,427	Castillejos
Maguisguis	625	518	294	297	1,326	Botolan
Malabago	1,950	1,974	1,705	1,467	1,304	Santa Cruz
Malabon (San Roque)	2,574	2,310	2,330	1,966	1,718	Candelaria
Malimanga	987	946	879	720	578	Candelaria
Maloma	4,608	4,408	3,910	3,533	2,907	San Felipe
Malomboy	410	71	398	184	1,097	Botolan
Mambog	3,540	3,388	3,288	2,890	1,902	Botolan
Mangan-Vaca	8,068	7,319	4,691	3,598	3,051	Subic
Manglicmot (Poblacion)	1,636	1,609	1,279	1,148	1,190	San Felipe
Matain	7,777	7,523	6,758	5,910	5,876	Subic
Moraza	311	244	156	36	569	Botolan
Nacolcol	528	431	377	124	693	Botolan
Nagbayan	2,421	2,311	1,648	1,273	1,216	Castillejos
Nagbunga	2,120	1,586	1,221	850	1,253	Castillejos
Nagbunga	1,885	1,597	1,260	894	1,633	San Marcelino
Namatacan	1,688	1,559	1,418	1,266	1,392	San Narciso
Natividad (Poblacion)	2,601	1,770	1,375	1,078	979	San Narciso
Naugsol	2,046	1,582	1,360	1,183	783	Subic
Naulo	1,785	1,746	1,400	1,249	1,022	Santa Cruz
New Cabalan	25,428	22,782	18,167	14,352	13,009	Olongapo
New Ilalim	1,423	1,574	1,484	1,656	1,493	Olongapo
New Kababae	2,261	2,423	2,092	2,147	2,185	Olongapo
New Kalalake	9,219	9,279	8,718	9,062	10,081	Olongapo
New San Juan	1,366	1,160	916	771	639	Cabangan
North Poblacion	1,651	1,541	1,760	1,567	1,759	Masinloc
Old Cabalan	18,259	20,110	12,348	9,354	10,167	Olongapo
Omaya	647	673	757	701	796	San Narciso
Owaog-Nibloc	247	137	267	173	168	Botolan
Paco (Poblacion)	2,068	1,704	2,124	1,720	1,753	Botolan
Pag-asa	5,672	6,160	5,716	5,698	7,045	Olongapo
Pagatpat	3,094	2,841	2,660	2,294	2,036	Santa Cruz
Paite	554	369	345	288	336	San Narciso
Palanginan (Palanguinan-Tambak)	9,010	8,764	5,075	4,883	4,760	Iba
Palis	327	155	144	–	328	Botolan
Pamatawan	3,817	2,910	2,514	2,282	2,295	Subic
Pamibian	1,098	1,007	1,178	961	919	Candelaria
Pamonoran	1,113	1,133	866	801	689	Santa Cruz
Panan	2,493	2,309	2,025	1,739	1,646	Botolan
Panayonan	941	1,079	957	899	864	Candelaria
Pangolingan	1,624	1,559	1,419	1,344	1,134	Palauig
Parel	1,082	1,006	887	800	799	Botolan
Patrocinio (Poblacion)	2,284	2,483	2,114	2,014	2,064	San Narciso
Paudpod	1,143	859	681	643	1,167	Botolan
Pinagrealan	937	748	676	436	435	Candelaria
Poblacion	1,092	955	1,173	1,165	1,154	Candelaria
Poblacion North	2,977	3,219	3,491	3,087	2,630	Santa Cruz
Poblacion South	3,270	2,784	3,157	2,881	2,592	Santa Cruz
Poonbato	629	721	626	254	2,553	Botolan
Porac	2,711	2,733	2,034	1,864	1,068	Botolan
Pundaquit	2,597	2,443	1,887	1,538	1,821	San Antonio
Rabanes	1,813	1,390	707	290	1,969	San Marcelino
Rizal	655	560	619	656	808	San Antonio
Rizal (Poblacion)	932	989	807	798	869	San Marcelino
Rosete (Poblacion)	1,463	1,341	1,173	1,076	1,244	San Felipe
Sabang	1,061	1,077	937	773	729	Santa Cruz
Salaza	4,069	3,537	4,059	3,528	1,544	Palauig
San Agustin	4,455	4,234	3,453	3,193	3,291	Castillejos
San Agustin	4,888	4,761	3,727	3,557	3,239	Iba
San Antonio	707	669	715	668	632	Cabangan
San Esteban	1,431	1,302	1,256	1,117	1,247	San Antonio
San Fernando	1,998	1,819	1,724	1,414	1,210	Santa Cruz
San Gregorio (Poblacion)	990	1,052	1,106	1,031	1,189	San Antonio
San Guillermo (Poblacion)	854	773	786	676	812	San Marcelino
San Isidro	1,330	1,258	1,111	968	869	Botolan
San Isidro	2,047	1,836	1,683	1,581	1,526	Cabangan
San Isidro	6,741	5,483	3,890	3,229	2,420	Subic
San Isidro (Poblacion)	1,852	1,778	1,678	1,493	1,768	San Marcelino
San Jose (Poblacion)	2,527	2,395	1,849	1,711	1,862	Castillejos
San Jose (Poblacion)	585	442	653	696	788	San Narciso
San Juan	4,353	5,703	4,443	5,051	2,214	Botolan
San Juan	1,148	1,015	1,019	903	916	Palauig
San Juan (Poblacion)	1,696	1,495	1,424	1,362	1,320	Cabangan
San Juan (Poblacion)	853	846	634	615	601	Castillejos
San Juan (Poblacion)	1,476	1,389	1,588	1,462	1,846	San Antonio
San Juan (Poblacion)	1,428	1,162	1,227	1,272	1,295	San Narciso
San Lorenzo	2,858	2,481	2,205	2,004	1,785	Masinloc
San Miguel	1,259	1,064	963	855	775	Botolan
San Miguel	4,730	4,146	3,879	2,612	2,635	San Antonio
San Nicolas	3,816	3,423	2,510	2,343	3,000	Castillejos
San Nicolas (Poblacion)	3,081	2,788	2,575	2,307	2,075	San Antonio
San Pablo (Poblacion)	8,141	6,463	5,022	4,043	3,902	Castillejos
San Pascual (Poblacion)	1,928	1,814	1,866	1,734	1,637	San Narciso
San Rafael	853	796	661	555	532	Cabangan
San Rafael	1,077	1,127	935	890	775	San Felipe
San Rafael	2,409	2,140	1,513	1,250	2,503	San Marcelino
San Rafael (Poblacion)	1,390	1,190	1,387	1,323	1,419	San Narciso
San Roque	1,414	1,344	1,137	1,104	1,178	Castillejos
San Salvador	1,875	1,801	1,829	1,620	1,445	Masinloc
Santa Barbara	3,747	3,501	2,899	2,250	1,960	Iba
Santa Fe	2,212	1,701	1,969	1,635	4,873	San Marcelino
Santa Maria	1,903	1,789	1,706	1,536	1,617	Castillejos
Santa Rita	1,764	1,751	1,446	1,238	1,019	Cabangan
Santa Rita	2,889	2,273	2,425	2,187	1,785	Masinloc
Santa Rita	39,793	40,023	33,477	30,580	34,856	Olongapo
Santiago	1,799	1,549	1,553	1,432	1,349	Botolan
Santiago	1,935	1,617	1,556	1,742	1,734	San Antonio
Santo Niño	979	870	694	687	672	Cabangan
Santo Niño	1,426	1,236	1,274	1,146	1,072	Palauig
Santo Niño	4,246	4,021	2,655	3,064	3,035	San Felipe
Santo Rosario	3,932	3,588	2,544	2,817	2,512	Iba
Santo Rosario	1,901	1,843	1,684	1,619	1,285	Masinloc
Santo Tomas	1,514	1,294	1,300	1,094	980	Palauig
Santo Tomas	5,504	5,086	3,974	4,050	3,258	Subic
Siminublan	1,477	1,629	1,393	1,225	1,195	San Narciso
Sinabacan	3,533	3,259	2,704	2,264	2,207	Candelaria
Sindol	2,130	1,895	1,494	1,297	890	San Felipe
South Poblacion	3,723	3,754	3,664	3,151	2,916	Masinloc
Tabalong	561	576	649	538	540	Santa Cruz
Taltal	4,502	4,796	4,739	4,284	6,282	Masinloc
Tampo (Poblacion)	1,415	1,427	1,385	1,578	1,537	Botolan
Taposo	989	832	835	674	566	Candelaria
Tapuac	2,503	2,257	2,118	1,847	1,512	Masinloc
Taugtog	12,981	13,364	11,767	10,561	745	Botolan
Tition (San Vicente)	1,383	1,369	1,315	1,093	793	Palauig
Tondo	990	915	858	824	694	Cabangan
Tubotubo North	2,224	2,116	1,947	1,496	1,519	Santa Cruz
Tubotubo South	1,793	1,821	1,828	1,472	1,603	Santa Cruz
Uacon	2,942	3,238	2,980	2,538	2,317	Candelaria
Villar	697	220	536	–	1,121	Botolan
Wawandue (Poblacion)	1,867	1,873	1,542	2,371	2,011	Subic
West Bajac-Bajac	7,548	8,221	8,015	9,155	10,214	Olongapo
West Dirita	2,973	2,826	2,307	3,357	2,794	San Antonio
West Poblacion	1,086	1,057	1,100	1,072	1,091	Palauig
West Tapinac	6,756	6,705	7,420	7,646	8,404	Olongapo
Yamot	1,309	1,187	1,196	1,005	800	Candelaria
Zone 1 Poblacion (Libaba)	2,027	1,708	1,654	1,299	1,148	Iba
Zone 2 Poblacion (Aypa)	914	805	778	554	670	Iba
Zone 3 Poblacion (Botlay)	465	442	439	626	464	Iba
Zone 4 Poblacion (Sagapan)	562	537	459	536	661	Iba
Zone 5 Poblacion (Bano)	1,550	1,413	1,392	1,307	1,400	Iba
Zone 6 Poblacion (Baytan)	683	689	749	712	747	Iba
Barangay	2010	2007	2000	1995	1990	City or municipality
*Italicized names are former names.; *Dashes (–) in cells indicate unavailable census data.

[top]
