= Zambales National High School =

Public high school in Zambales, Philippines

- Pambansang Mataas na Paaralan ng Zambales

Location
- Olongapo-Bugallon RD., Zone 6 Central Luzon; Iba, Zambales; Philippines
- Coordinates: 15°19′22″N 119°59′01″E

Information
- Former names: Zambales High School, Iba Farm School
- Type: Public School
- Established: 1913
- Founder: Alejo Labrador
- Principal: Principal II Allan E. Carbonell.
- Grades: 7 to 12
- Enrollment: 5,000
- Campus: Main (Zone 6, Iba, Zamb.) Annex (Bangantalinga, Iba, Zamb.)
- Nickname: Zambales High
- Newspaper: The Chromite (English), Ang Dagitab (Filipino)
- Website: Zambalesnhs.webs.com

Zambales National High School (Filipino: Mataas na Paaralang Pambansa Ng Zambales) is a public school in Iba, Zambales, Philippines. It is one of the oldest secondary schools in the Philippines.

== History ==
In 1913, Congressman Alejo Labrador initiated the move to put up a vocational school in the province. The provincial government donated an eleven hectare farm where the school stands now, lending it the colloquial name of the Iba Farm School. A first two-story school building was constructed in R.M.M.S.A.T (R.M.P.C) school grounds (Old Site). The first school administrators were Americans. In 1918, the first batch of graduates emerged from the school. School Year 1917-1918 saw the first batch of graduates, all 19 boys were coming from various towns of the province

=== World War II ===
On December 8, 1941, Iba Air strip was bombed by Japanese warplanes prompting the school authorities to suspend classes. The students then were allowed to earn their degree despite non-completion of required days of schooling. Those in the lower year were accelerated to the next higher year level. The school was subsequently used as Japanese Headquarters. During the war, S.Y. 1941-1945, there were a total of 50 graduates; 20 boys and 30 girls.

== Enrollment ==
Zambales National High School has an estimated enrollment of 3,400 students. The school serves students from the municipalities of Iba, Botolan, Cabangan, Palauig, Masinloc, Candelaria and Santa Cruz. Students living outside of the town commute via public utility vehicles such as jeepneys and bus. Others opt to rent in boarding houses and apartments to reduce travel time and expense.

== School buildings ==
- Gabaldon Building - it was constructed in 1928 on the land donated by the provincial government. The building is the home of Grade 10 students.
- BL (Bagong Lipunan) Building - Built in 1979. Currently not in use.
- E.S.F (Economics Support Fund)- Built In 1985. It is for the new students, Grade 7 and Grade 8.
- J.I.C.A (Japanese International Cooperative Agency) - it is for the Junior High students. J.I.C.A is located near the Tacar River. Currently not in use.
- D.T.B (Deloso Type) Building - Built in 1995, it was donated by Governor Deloso. It is the home for the Junior High students and is located at the back of BL Building.
- S.F (School of the Future BLDG.) - Donated by the late 2nd district congressman Antonio Diaz. It was constructed in 1999. It is the home to the Science, and Math Departments as well as the S.T.E. (Science Technology and Engineering) section and the various labs. Used to house the ESP and Filipino Department, but as of July 2025, the two have been moved to the Gabaldon Building in place for a new classroom.
- Sulong Zambales BLDG. - Donated by Gov. Hermogenes Ebdane, it was constructed in 2011. The AP Department holds office in this building. It is also home for the Sophomore students.
- DEPED BLDG. - Newly constructed building in the school Donated by Congresswoman Cheryl Deloso a 6-room building home for SPA (Special Program in the Arts) students and the MAPEH Department.
- NEW DEPED BLDG. - Constructed in 2021, it is home to the SPED (Special Education) and Grade 9 sections.
- Phil-Aus BLDG. (Philippine-Australia Building) - Constructed through the help of the Australian government and is now home to the SPFL (Special Program in Foreign Language) students.
- SHS BLDG. (Senior High School Buildings) - A 4-story building home to the Senior High School students.

== School newspapers ==
Students Making a news article for Chromite Newspaper c.1950's

The Chromite
is the English language newspaper. It is headed by the English Department and is one of the oldest school newspaper organ in the province Of Zambales. Chromite rank 2nd place in Best news section and 6th Place in Best in Sports Section in the NSPC 2015 held in Taguig City, And 1st best English newspaper in Zambales.: The Chromite FB Page

Ang Dagitab
is the Filipino language newspaper, owned by the Filipino Department. The Leading Filipino newspaper in The Province. Dagitab rank 2nd place in best Filipino Newspaper in Zambales: Ang Dagitab FB Page

== List of School Administrators ==
The List of Principal Through time and contributed in Zambales High.

circa 1924 to Present
c.1924- c.1926	Mr. Silverio Dinoso
c.1926- c.1927	Mr. Esteban A. Bada
c.1927- c.1928	Mr. Indalizo Madamba
c.1928- c.1929	Mr. Jose C. Aguila
c.1929- c.1936	Mr. Igmedio Valderama
c.1936- c.1943	Mr. Angel M. Instrella
c.1943- c.1945	Mr. Saturnino A. Abes
c.1945- c.1945	Mr. Peter Villabert
c.1945- c.1947	Mr. Hilario Hilario
c.1947- c.1948	Mr. Felipe Antolin
c.1948- c.1952	Mr. Andres Agcaoili
c.1952- c.1962	Mr. Zacarias Beltran
c.1962- c.1969	Mr. Isidoro A. Talucad
c.1969- c.1972	Mr. Miguel Sahagun Sr.
c.1972- JUNE 10, 1985	Mrs. Margarita Fontelera
JUNE 11, 1985- SEPT. 23, 1985	Mr. Adolf U. Battad O.I.C.
SEPT. 25, 1985- Nov. 3, 1985	Dr. Miguel Sison O.I.C.
DEC.1985- MAY, 1986	Dr. Nestorio E. Trinidad O.I.C.
JUNE.1986 -AUG.1992	Mr. Raulito O. Moscoso
SEPT.1992 - MAY, 1999	Mr. Mauro C. Sazon
JUNE, 1999- NOV., 1999	Mr. Noel O. Tamoria O.I.C.
NOV.1999- JULY, 2000	Mr. Ernesto F. Talucad O.I.C.
JULY, 2000 - JULY,2013	DR. Josephine T. Edora, Ed. D.
JULY,2013 – August 2020	DR. Felita C. Pulido, Ed. D.
August 2020 - July 2024	Mr. Guillermo E. Mantes
July 2024 – 2025	DR. Emma L. Bayona, Ed. D.
June 2025 – Present	Principal II Allan E. Cabonell
