= Legislative districts of Olongapo =

Legislative district of the Philippines

The legislative district of Olongapo was the representation of the city of Olongapo in the Regular Batasang Pambansa from 1984 to 1986.

== History ==
Prior to gaining separate representation, areas now under the jurisdiction of Olongapo were represented under the provinces of Zambales (1898–1972) and Region III (1978–1984).

By virtue of being classified as a highly urbanized city on December 7, 1983, Olongapo was granted separate representation for the first time in the Regular Batasang Pambansa, electing one representative, at large, in 1984.

Under the new Constitution which was proclaimed on February 11, 1987, the city was once again grouped with Zambales and formed part of its first congressional district. The district elected its member to the restored House of Representatives starting that same year.

== At-Large (defunct) ==
Period	Representative
Regular Batasang Pambansa; 1984–1986	Amelia J. Gordon

== See also ==
- Legislative districts of Zambales
