= Zambales's 2nd congressional district =

Legislative district of the Philippines

- Constituency for the House of Representatives of the Philippines
- Location of Zambales within the Philippines
- Province: Zambales
- Region: Central Luzon
- Population: 432,095 (2020)
- Electorate: 286,690 (2022)
- Major settlements: 10 LGUs: Municipalities; Botolan; Cabangan; Candelaria; Iba; Masinloc; Palauig; San Antonio; San Felipe; San Narciso; Santa Cruz
- Area: 2,848.82 km^{2} (1,099.94 sq mi)

Current constituency
- Created: 1987
- Representative: Doris E. Maniquiz
- Political party: SZP; Lakas
- Congressional bloc: Majority

Zambales's 2nd congressional district is one of the two congressional districts of the Philippines in the province of Zambales. It has been represented in the House of Representatives since 1987. The district consists of the provincial capital Iba and the rest of the municipalities north of the Subic Bay region, namely Botolan, Cabangan, Candelaria, Masinloc, Palauig, San Antonio, San Felipe, San Narciso and Santa Cruz. It is currently represented in the 20th Congress by Doris E. Maniquiz of the Sulong Zambales Party (SZP) and Lakas–CMD (Lakas).

== Representation history ==
#	Image	Member	Term of office		Congress	Party	Electoral history	Constituent LGUs
#	Image	Member	Start	End	Congress	Party	Electoral history	Constituent LGUs
=== Zambales's 2nd district for the House of Representatives of the Philippines ===
District created February 2, 1987 from Zambales's at-large district.
1		Pacita T. Gonzalez	June 30, 1987	June 30, 1992	8th	LDP	Elected in 1987.	1987–present Botolan, Cabangan, Candelaria, Iba, Masinloc, Palauig, San Antonio, San Felipe, San Narciso, Santa Cruz
2		Antonio Diaz	June 30, 1992	June 30, 2001	9th	Lakas	Elected in 1992.	1987–present Botolan, Cabangan, Candelaria, Iba, Masinloc, Palauig, San Antonio, San Felipe, San Narciso, Santa Cruz
2		Antonio Diaz	June 30, 1992	June 30, 2001	10th	Lakas	Re-elected in 1995.	1987–present Botolan, Cabangan, Candelaria, Iba, Masinloc, Palauig, San Antonio, San Felipe, San Narciso, Santa Cruz
2		Antonio Diaz	June 30, 1992	June 30, 2001	11th	LAMMP	Re-elected in 1998.	1987–present Botolan, Cabangan, Candelaria, Iba, Masinloc, Palauig, San Antonio, San Felipe, San Narciso, Santa Cruz
3		Ruben Torres	June 30, 2001	June 30, 2004	12th	Lakas	Elected in 2001.	1987–present Botolan, Cabangan, Candelaria, Iba, Masinloc, Palauig, San Antonio, San Felipe, San Narciso, Santa Cruz
(2)		Antonio Diaz	June 30, 2004	August 3, 2011	13th	Liberal	Elected in 2004.	1987–present Botolan, Cabangan, Candelaria, Iba, Masinloc, Palauig, San Antonio, San Felipe, San Narciso, Santa Cruz
(2)		Antonio Diaz	June 30, 2004	August 3, 2011	14th	Lakas	Re-elected in 2007.	1987–present Botolan, Cabangan, Candelaria, Iba, Masinloc, Palauig, San Antonio, San Felipe, San Narciso, Santa Cruz
(2)		Antonio Diaz	June 30, 2004	August 3, 2011	15th	LM	Re-elected in 2010. Died.	1987–present Botolan, Cabangan, Candelaria, Iba, Masinloc, Palauig, San Antonio, San Felipe, San Narciso, Santa Cruz
4		Jun Omar C. Ebdane	February 6, 2012	June 30, 2013	15th	LM	Elected in 2012 to finish Diaz's term.	1987–present Botolan, Cabangan, Candelaria, Iba, Masinloc, Palauig, San Antonio, San Felipe, San Narciso, Santa Cruz
4		Jun Omar C. Ebdane	February 6, 2012	June 30, 2013	15th	SZP	Elected in 2012 to finish Diaz's term.	1987–present Botolan, Cabangan, Candelaria, Iba, Masinloc, Palauig, San Antonio, San Felipe, San Narciso, Santa Cruz
5		Cheryl Deloso Montalla	June 30, 2013	June 30, 2022	16th	Liberal	Elected in 2013.	1987–present Botolan, Cabangan, Candelaria, Iba, Masinloc, Palauig, San Antonio, San Felipe, San Narciso, Santa Cruz
5		Cheryl Deloso Montalla	June 30, 2013	June 30, 2022	17th	Liberal	Re-elected in 2016.	1987–present Botolan, Cabangan, Candelaria, Iba, Masinloc, Palauig, San Antonio, San Felipe, San Narciso, Santa Cruz
5		Cheryl Deloso Montalla	June 30, 2013	June 30, 2022	18th	NPC	Re-elected in 2019.	1987–present Botolan, Cabangan, Candelaria, Iba, Masinloc, Palauig, San Antonio, San Felipe, San Narciso, Santa Cruz
4		Doris E. Maniquiz	June 30, 2022	Incumbent	19th	Lakas (SZP)	Elected in 2022.	1987–present Botolan, Cabangan, Candelaria, Iba, Masinloc, Palauig, San Antonio, San Felipe, San Narciso, Santa Cruz
4		Doris E. Maniquiz	June 30, 2022	Incumbent	20th	Lakas (SZP)	Re-elected in 2025.	1987–present Botolan, Cabangan, Candelaria, Iba, Masinloc, Palauig, San Antonio, San Felipe, San Narciso, Santa Cruz

== Election results ==
=== 2025 ===
Candidate	Party	Votes	%
Bing Maniquiz (incumbent)	Lakas–CMD	173,074	68.41
Cheryl Deloso-Montalla	Nationalist People's Coalition	79,928	31.59
Total		253,002	100.00
Valid votes		253,002	97.27
Invalid/blank votes		7,114	2.73
Total votes		260,116	100.00
Registered voters/turnout		298,819	87.05
Lakas–CMD hold			
Source: Commission on Elections

=== 2022 ===
2022 Philippine House of Representatives elections
Party	Candidate	Votes	%
SZP	Doris Maniquiz	144,060	62.13
NPC	Amor Deloso	76,906	33.17
Independent	Philip Camara	10,890	4.70
Total votes		231,856	100.00
SZP gain from NPC			

=== 2019 ===
2019 Philippine House of Representatives elections
Party	Candidate	Votes	%
Liberal	Cheryl Deloso-Montalla	134,801	69.99
PDP–Laban	Wilfredo Paul Pangan	57,801	30.01
Total votes		192,602	100.00
Liberal hold			

=== 2016 ===
2016 Philippine House of Representatives elections
Party	Candidate	Votes	%
Liberal	Cheryl Deloso-Montalla	127,509	70.88
SZP	Hart Jeresano	52,386	29.12
Total votes		179,895	100.00
Liberal hold			

=== 2013 ===
2013 Philippine House of Representatives elections
Party	Candidate	Votes	%
Liberal	Cheryl Deloso-Montalla	74,229	55.19
SZP	Jun Omar Ebdane	60,280	44.81
Total votes		134,509	100.00
Liberal gain from LM			

=== 2012 special ===
2012 special election at Zambales's 2nd district
Party	Candidate	Votes	%
LM	Jun Omar Ebdane	62,867	44.13
Liberal	Cheryl Deloso-Montalla	56,945	39.97
Nacionalista	Rica Victoria Diaz-Arambulo	17,291	39.97
Independent	Wilfredo Paul Pangan	3,858	2.71
Independent	Alfred Mendoza	1,512	1.06
Total votes		142,473	100.00
LM hold			

=== 2010 ===
2010 Philippine House of Representatives elections
Party	Candidate	Votes	%
LM	Antonio Diaz	76,928	49.00
Liberal	Cheryl Deloso-Montalla	71,672	45.65
Lakas	Alfred Mendoza	8,391	5.34
Total votes		156,991	100.00
LM hold			

== See also ==
- Legislative districts of Zambales
