= San Felipe, Zambales =

Municipality in Zambales, Philippines

San Felipe Bobulon
- Municipality
- Municipality of San Felipe
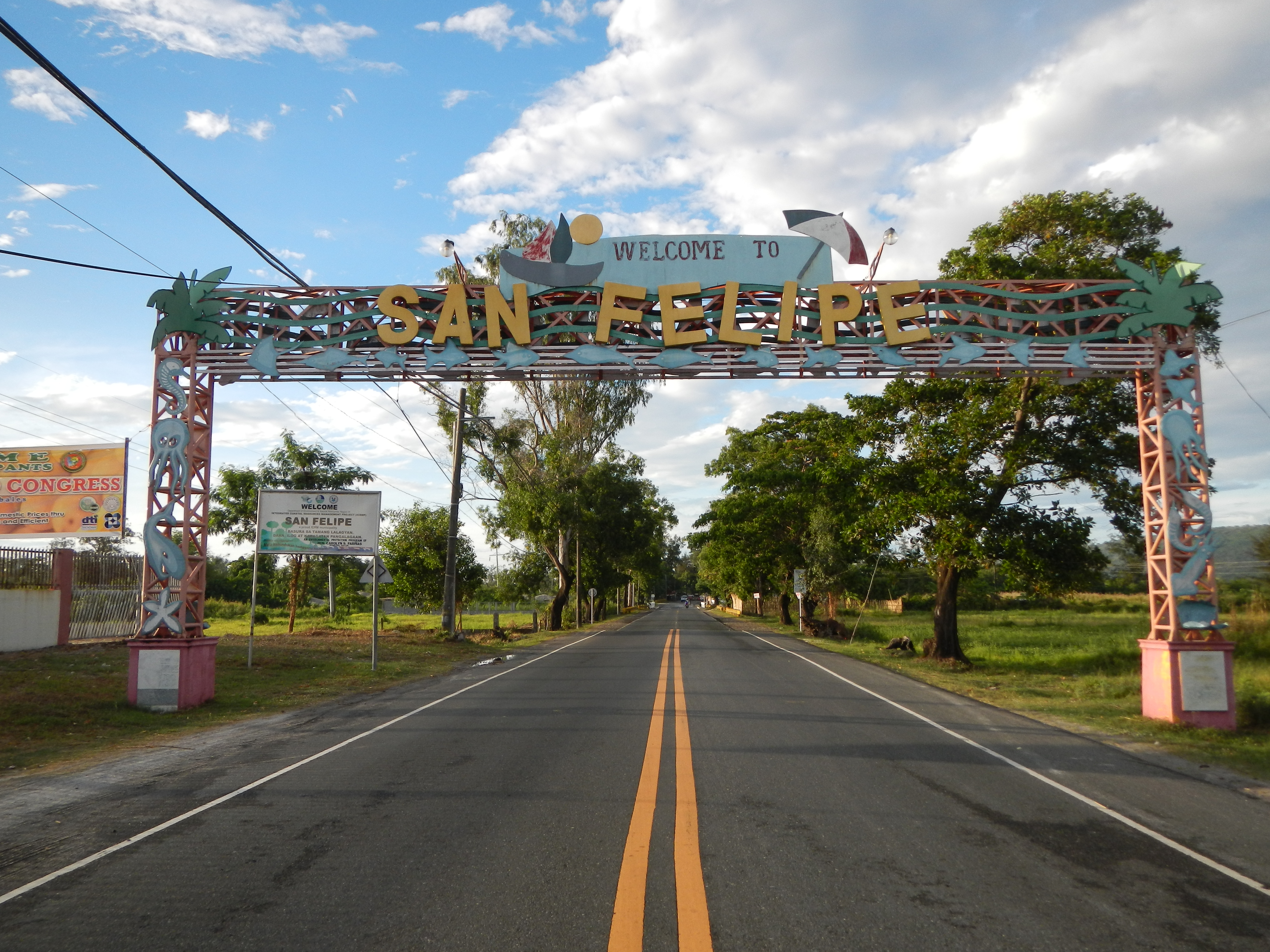
- Welcome Arch

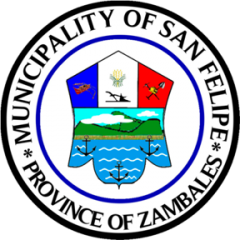
- Seal
- Motto: Care for San Felipe... Unite for San Felipe... Be Loyal to San Felipe...
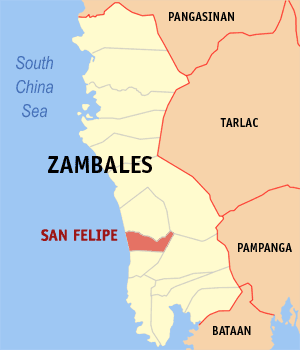
- Map of Zambales with San Felipe highlighted
- Interactive map of San Felipe
- Location within the Philippines
- Coordinates: 15°03′43″N 120°04′12″E
- Country: Philippines
- Region: Central Luzon
- Province: Zambales
- District: 2nd district
- Founded: 1795
- Barangays: 11 (see Barangays)

Government
  - Type: Sangguniang Bayan
  - Mayor: Reinhard E. Jeresano
  - Vice Mayor: Mary Ann R. Quiba
  - Representative: Doris "Nanay Bing" E. Maniquiz
  - Municipal Council: Members: Robert R. Torres; Ronald Jetro L. De Jesus; Ramil T. Ablian; Roselyn S. Manglicmot; Sir Alfred A. Abille; Rex Daniel A. Asutilla, LPT; Michael Gary P. Fariñas; Ray A. Frondarina
  - Electorate: 17,178 voters (2025)

Area
  - Total: 111.60 km^{2} (43.09 sq mi)
- Elevation: 31 m (102 ft)
- Highest elevation: 378 m (1,240 ft)
- Lowest elevation: 0 m (0 ft)

Population (2024 census)
  - Total: 26,081
  - Density: 233.70/km^{2} (605.28/sq mi)
  - Households: 6,571

Economy
  - Income class: 3rd municipal income class
  - Poverty incidence: 14.61% (2023)
  - Revenue: ₱ 234.7 million (2024)
  - Assets: ₱ 415.3 million (2024)
  - Expenditure: ₱ 187.5 million (2024)
  - Liabilities: ₱ 76.27 million (2024)

Service provider
  - Electricity: Zambales 2 Electric Cooperative (ZAMECO 2)
- Time zone: UTC+8 (PST)
- ZIP code: 2204
- PSGC: 0307110000
- IDD : area code: +63 (0)47
- Native languages: Ilocano; Tagalog; Sambal

San Felipe, officially the Municipality of San Felipe (Ilocano: Ili ti San Felipe, Filipino: Bayan ng San Felipe), is a municipality in the province of Zambales, Philippines. According to the 2024 census, it has a population of 26,081 people.

== Etymology ==
The town's former name, Bobulon, was changed to San Felipe when it was formally founded in 1853. As to how the town of San Felipe got its present name, the most reliable fact learned so far was that four “saintly” brothers from Ilocandia, namely Marcelino, Antonio, Narciso and Felipe settled in the about to be organized pueblos which were later named San Marcelino, San Antonio, San Narciso and San Felipe. As a matter of fact, most of the inhabitants of these four towns were Ilocanos from the Ilocos region.

== History ==
San Felipe was one of the little villages along the coastal region of Zambales during the pre-Spanish period. The first inhabitants were the Malay Zambals who lived in lowland which they themselves called Hindol. There were also Negritoes, but most of them lived in the mountains.

A few years after the Spanish discovery of the Philippines, all places in the country had been explored by the Spanish authorities. The exploration of Zambales began in 1572 by Juan de Salcedo, grandson of Miguel Lopez de Legaspi, first Spanish Governor General of the Philippines. Juan de Salcedo and Spanish followers made a survey of its coastal region, and organized communities which were first called encomiendas but later called pueblos. Around the early and mid-19th century, as the population of the villages increased due to the steady immigration of Ilocanos from the Ilocandia region, more pueblos were organized.

The first waves of Ilocanos found their way to Hindol, which was later called Sindol, and less than the kilometers south of Sindol was the place called Bobulon. Hindol was a Zambal Aeta name of a tree than abundant in the place. Bobulon was also a kind tree then abundant at the Public Plaza. However, there was another version why it was called Bobulon. It was said that the first voyage of Ilocano settlers had all the favorable wind (bulon) from Paoay, Ilocos Norte to this village. The other waves of Ilocano settlers, who were mostly merchants and fishermen, came from Vigan and San Vincente, Ilocos Sur.

The first seat of the pueblo government was in Sindol and the head of the pueblo was called Capitan Municipal who as head of the pueblo was responsible in paying the taxes which could not be collected from his barangays which were headed by Cabezas de barangay. As gathered from reliable sources, one of the town executives when the seat of the government was still here in Sindol was Capitan Municipal Pedro Farañal, father of the late Municipal President Juan Farañal. The pueblo was later transferred from Sindol to Bobulon because the latter was already more populated, had a wider area for residential purposes, and it was farther from the mountains were the aetas, still wild lived.

=== Mount Pinatubo eruption ===
The town was affected by the 1991 Mount Pinatubo eruption, being buried in about a meter in volcanic ash but damage was comparatively light.

==== Banawen and Yangil tribes reforestation ====
The Ambala, Mag-antsi and Mag-indi are indigenous ethnic groups from the Aeta people. The Banawen and Yangil tribes (with around 57 families) of sitios Banawen and Yangil, Barangay Maloma, San Felipe own about 4,000 ha (9,900 acres) of ancestral domain. The tribes' land was devastated due to the 1991 eruption of Mount Pinatubo. In 2017, however, they started to reforest the barren collage portion thereof with 62,000 trees based on green economy per agroforestry to deter climate change.

The trees planted include parkia timoriana, narra, yakal, tibig, calamansi, cashew, bamboo, jackfruit, tamarind, palosapis, lauan and madre de cacao. The tribes were assisted by the NCIP Zambales office, San Felipe LGU, two Aeta tribal chiefs, Indigenous Peoples Municipal Representative, People's Organization leader, the Bukidnon Talaandig tribe, the Hineleban Foundation and Circle Hostel. The community also learned to plant with biochar using flammable grass and wood to develop water storing soil enhancers.

== Geography ==
San Felipe is 36 kilometers (22 mi) from Iba, 42 kilometers (26 mi) from Olongapo, and 168 kilometers (104 mi) from Manila. It is between San Narciso and Cabangan on the Olongapo–Bugallon Road.

=== Barangays ===
San Felipe is subdivided into 11 barangays, as indicated below. Each barangay consists of puroks and some have sitios.

- Amagna (Poblacion)
- Apostol (Poblacion)
- Balincaguing
- Farañal (Poblacion)
- Feria (Poblacion)
- Maloma
- Manglicmot (Poblacion)
- Rosete (Poblacion)
- San Rafael
- Santo Niño
- Sindol

The municipality is divided into barangays located within the poblacion (town proper) and those situated outside it.

Poblacion barangays are generally named in honor of former local leaders:

- Barangay Apostol – named after the late Capitan Municipal Juan Apostol.
- Barangay Manglicmot – named after Capitanes Municipales Julian Manglicmot, Casimiro Manglicmot, and Lope Manglicmot.
- Barangay Feria – named after the late Capitan Municipal Ambrosio Feria.
- Barangay Amagna – named after Municipal President Nicolas Amagna.
- Barangay Rosete – named after the late Capitan Municipal Pedro Rosete.
- Barangay Farañal – named in honor of the late Capitan Municipal Pedro Farañal, during the period when the municipal seat of government was still in Sindol.

Barangay outside the poblacion include:

- Barangay Balincaguing – its name is derived from the Zambal words balin (house or home) and caguing (wild bats).

=== Climate ===
Climate data for San Felipe, Zambales
Month	Jan	Feb	Mar	Apr	May	Jun	Jul	Aug	Sep	Oct	Nov	Dec	Year
Mean daily maximum °C (°F)	31 (88)	32 (90)	33 (91)	34 (93)	32 (90)	31 (88)	29 (84)	29 (84)	29 (84)	30 (86)	31 (88)	31 (88)	31 (88)
Mean daily minimum °C (°F)	20 (68)	20 (68)	21 (70)	23 (73)	25 (77)	25 (77)	25 (77)	25 (77)	24 (75)	23 (73)	22 (72)	20 (68)	23 (73)
Average precipitation mm (inches)	16 (0.6)	18 (0.7)	28 (1.1)	51 (2.0)	200 (7.9)	253 (10.0)	301 (11.9)	293 (11.5)	246 (9.7)	171 (6.7)	70 (2.8)	28 (1.1)	1,675 (66)
Average rainy days	6.2	7.1	10.4	15.5	24.4	26.4	28.2	27.5	26.2	23.6	15.9	8.7	220.1
Source: Meteoblue

== Demographics ==
Population census of San Felipe
Year	Pop.	±% p.a.
1903	4,326	—
1918	5,151	+1.17%
1939	6,551	+1.15%
1948	7,781	+1.93%
1960	9,861	+1.99%
1970	13,283	+3.02%
1975	13,905	+0.92%
1980	13,834	−0.10%
1990	15,624	+1.22%
1995	16,837	+1.41%
2000	17,702	+1.08%
2007	21,322	+2.60%
2010	22,020	+1.18%
2015	23,183	+0.99%
2020	25,033	+1.63%
2024	26,081	+0.99%
Source: Philippine Statistics Authority

In the 2024 census, the population of San Felipe was 26,081 people, with a density of 230 inhabitants per square kilometer or 600 inhabitants per square mile.

Much of the population are Ilocanos, descendants of migrants from Ilocos.

=== Religion ===
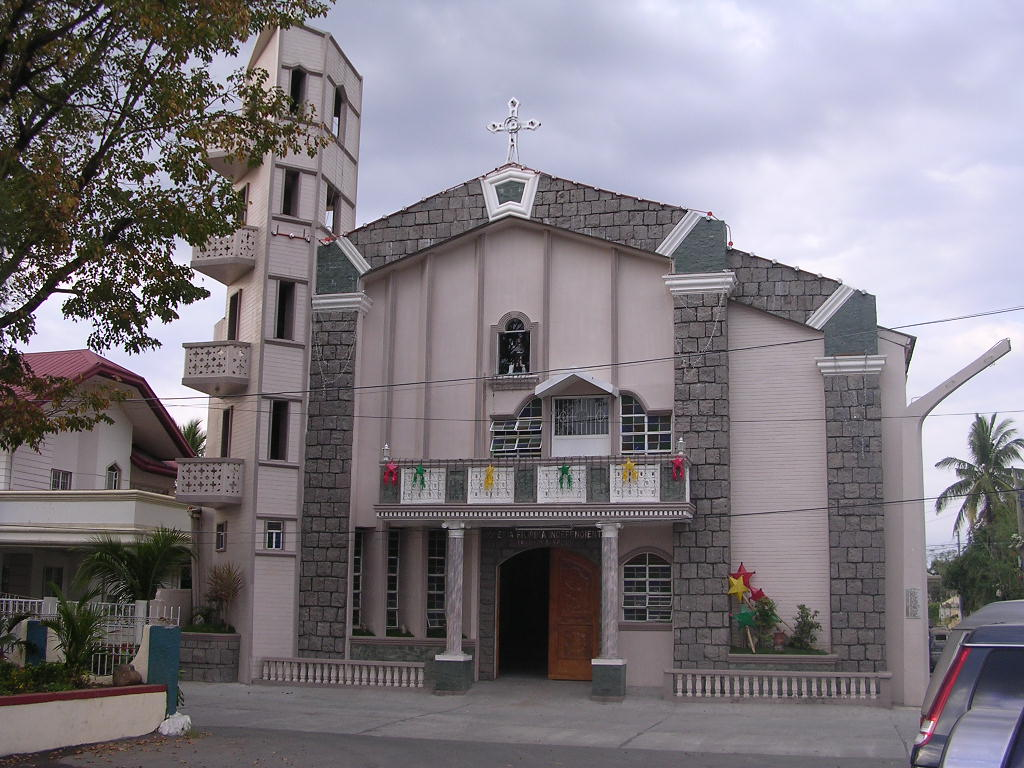
Cathedral Church of San Roque of the Philippine Independent Church in San Felipe

There are local branches of the Christian denominations of Methodist, Philippine Independent Church, International Assemblies of the First Born, Jesus is Lord and Roman Catholic Church.

The Cathedral of San Roque (Saint Roch in English), the episcopal see of the Zambales diocese of the Philippine Independent Church is located next to the plaza.

The local parish of the Catholic Church is also dedicated to San Roque and was staffed by the Columban Fathers until recent years.

== Economy ==
Poverty incidence of San Felipe (%)

Source: Philippine Statistics Authority

== Government ==
=== Local government ===
Under the Spanish regime and during the early part of American regime, San Felipe was a separate town. Its first Municipal President was Don Saturnino Pastor who was the town executive from January 1, 1901, to December 31, 1902. For the purpose of governmental administration, San Felipe was incorporated with San Narciso, The Municipal President of the combined towns of San Felipe and San Narciso was Don Simeon Maranon and Nicolas Amagna was the Municipal Vice-president. Being a smaller town, San Felipe was only entitled to four Councilors while San Narciso had five. The councilors for San Felipe were – Don Juan Farañal, Don Victorino Amancio, Don Alejo Apostol and Don Macario Manglicmot. These officials, together with some others in San Felipe, later worked for the separation of San Felipe from San Narciso through Don Alberto Barretto, who was then a member of the first Philippine Assembly. Meanwhile, before the separation Don Angel Dumlao y Farrales, from San Narciso, took over as Municipal President for San Felipe – San Narciso covering the period from January 1, 1905, to February 28, 1908.

Under the combined leadership of Nicolas Amagna, Flaviano Dumlao, Severo Amagna, Nemesio Farrales, Isidoro Fuenticilla and Joaquin Feria a resolution was adopted to effect the final separation of San Felipe from San Narciso. On March 1, 1908, San Felipe was formally separated from San Narciso and the first Municipal officials after separation were;

- Nicolas Amagna - Municipal President
- Isidoro Fuenticilla - Mun. Vice-president
- Santiago Labrador - Councilor
- Flaviano Dumlao - Councilor
- Jose Abille - Councilor
- Leoncio Borja - Councilor
- Bartolome Mendaros - Councilor
- Nemesio Farrales - Councilor
- Joaquin Feria - Councilor
- Macario Rico - Councilor

== Education ==
The San Felipe Schools District Office governs all educational institutions within the municipality. It oversees the management and operations of all private and public, from primary to secondary schools.

There are private, public and parochial elementary, and high schools and technological college in the municipality.

=== Primary and elementary schools ===
- Balincaguing Elementary School
- Bobulon Elementary School
- Laoag Elementary School
- Luke 19:4 Child Development Center
- Maloma Community Elementary School
- Pedro M. Arce Ecumenical School
- Sagpat Elementary School
- Saint Columban's Montessori School
- San Felipe Central Elementary School (East)
- San Felipe Central Elementary School (West)
- San Rafael Elementary School
- Santo Nino Elementary School
- Santo Tomas Elementary School
- Sindol Elementary School

=== Secondary schools ===
- Gov. Manuel D. Barretto National High School
- San Rafael Technical Vocational High School
- Don Getulio Feria Arindaeng High School
- Sagpat High School
- St. Columban's Montessori School
- Technological College of San Felipe (High School)
- Zambales Central Institute

=== Higher educational institution ===
- Technological College

== Tourism ==
- Century Old Tree: Situated in Barangay Maloma, San Felipe, Zambales.
- Coastal Beach Area: Barangay Santo Nino, San Felipe, Zambales.
- Barrio Liwliwa: Liwliwa is a prime surfing spot three hours away from Manila. Resorts includes Kapitan's Liwa Surf Resort, Kuya Bot's, Board Culture Liw-Liwa (BCL), La Sarina, Aragoza Beach Resort, The Circle Hostel and Camp Rofelio Surfing Beach Resort in San Felipe.
- Lubong-Nangoloan Waterfalls: Situated in Barangay Feria, San Felipe, Zambales.
- Grotto Falls: Situated in Barangay Feria, San Felipe, Zambales.
- Benedictine Retreat House: This retreat house is run by the Benedictine sisters and was constructed on land donated by the Sebastian family. The late Sister Henrietta Sebastian was a nun of the Benedictine order. A number of schools and religious groups, even as far away from Manila, conduct their retreats in this facility. The compound also houses relocated groups that were displaced by Mt. Pinatubo. You can also buy religious articles from them (for pasalubongs).
- Sabangan of the North: A picnic and/or scenic site. From Sindol cars, jeeps, SUVs and tricycles can easily navigate the road which is part concrete and dirt road to take you to there.
- Brandenburg Resort: Located at Barangay Sindol, San Felipe, Zambales.
- Montecruz Beach Resort: Located at Barangay Santo Nino, San Felipe.
- Greenspace Artist Village: Located at Liwliwa, San Felipe, Zambales.

== Gallery ==
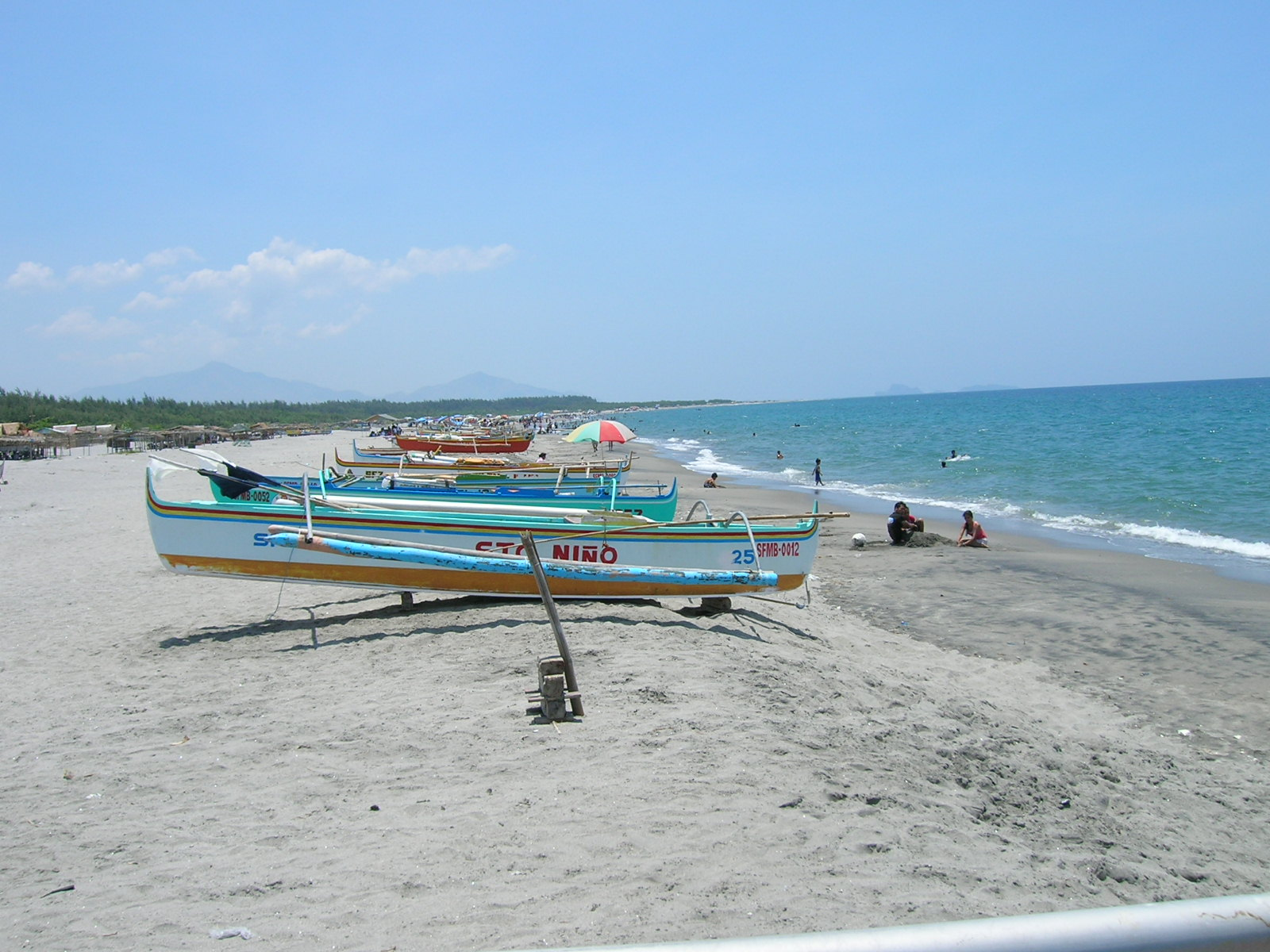
San Felipe Beach

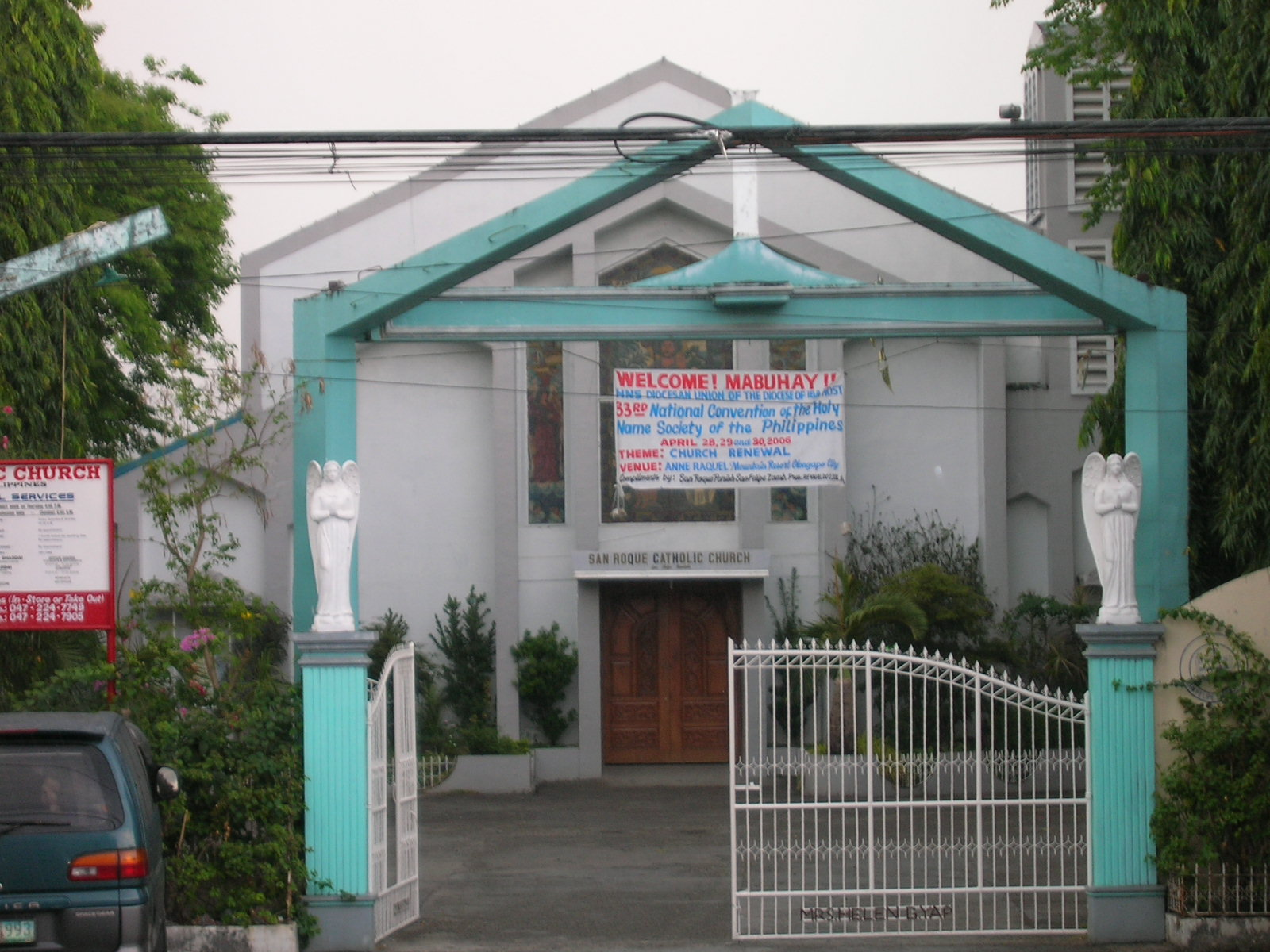
San Roque Catholic Church

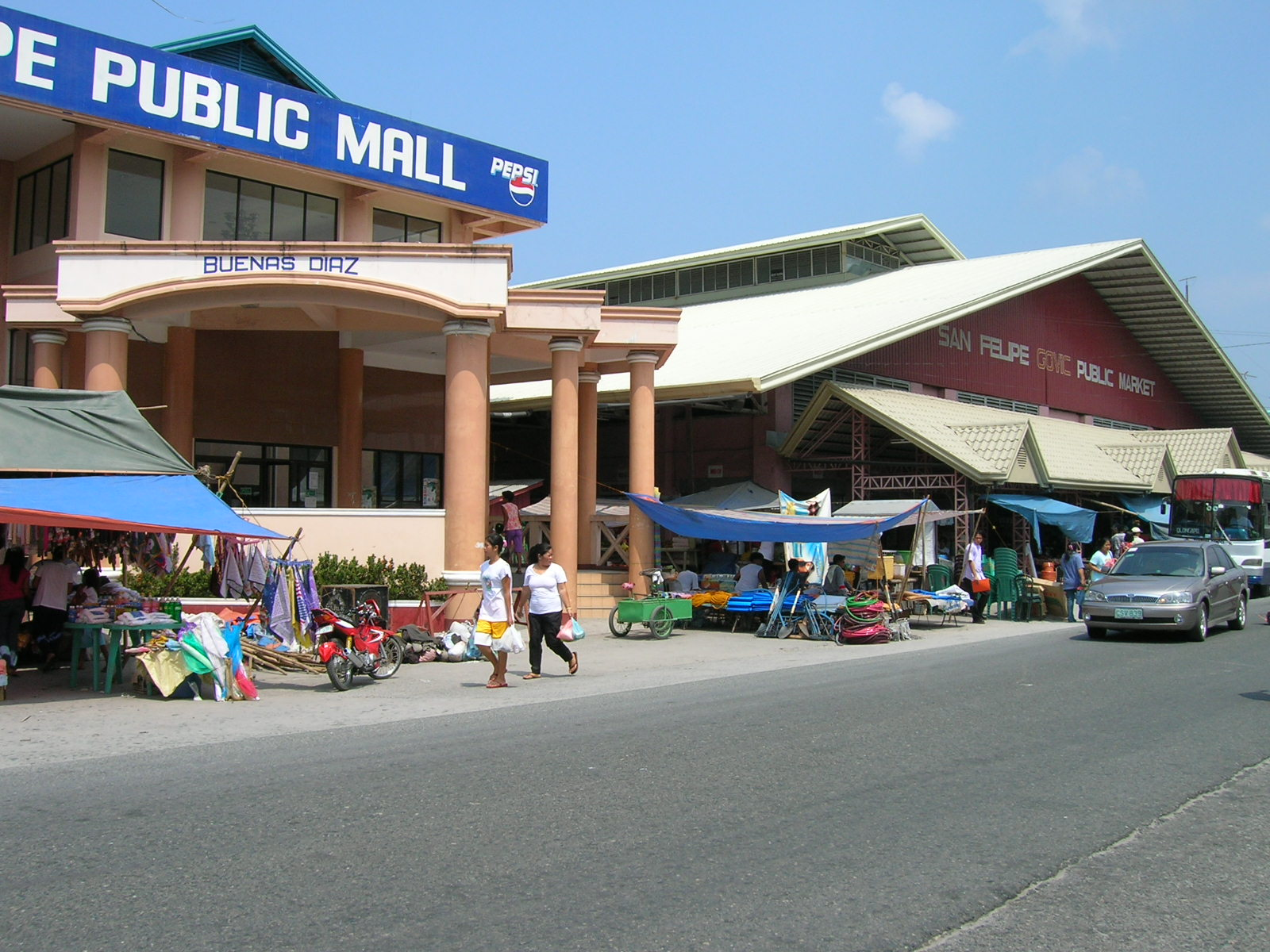
San Felipe Zambales Public Market and Mall
