= San Narciso, Zambales =

Municipality in Zambales, Philippines

San Narciso Alusiis
- Municipality
- Municipality of San Narciso
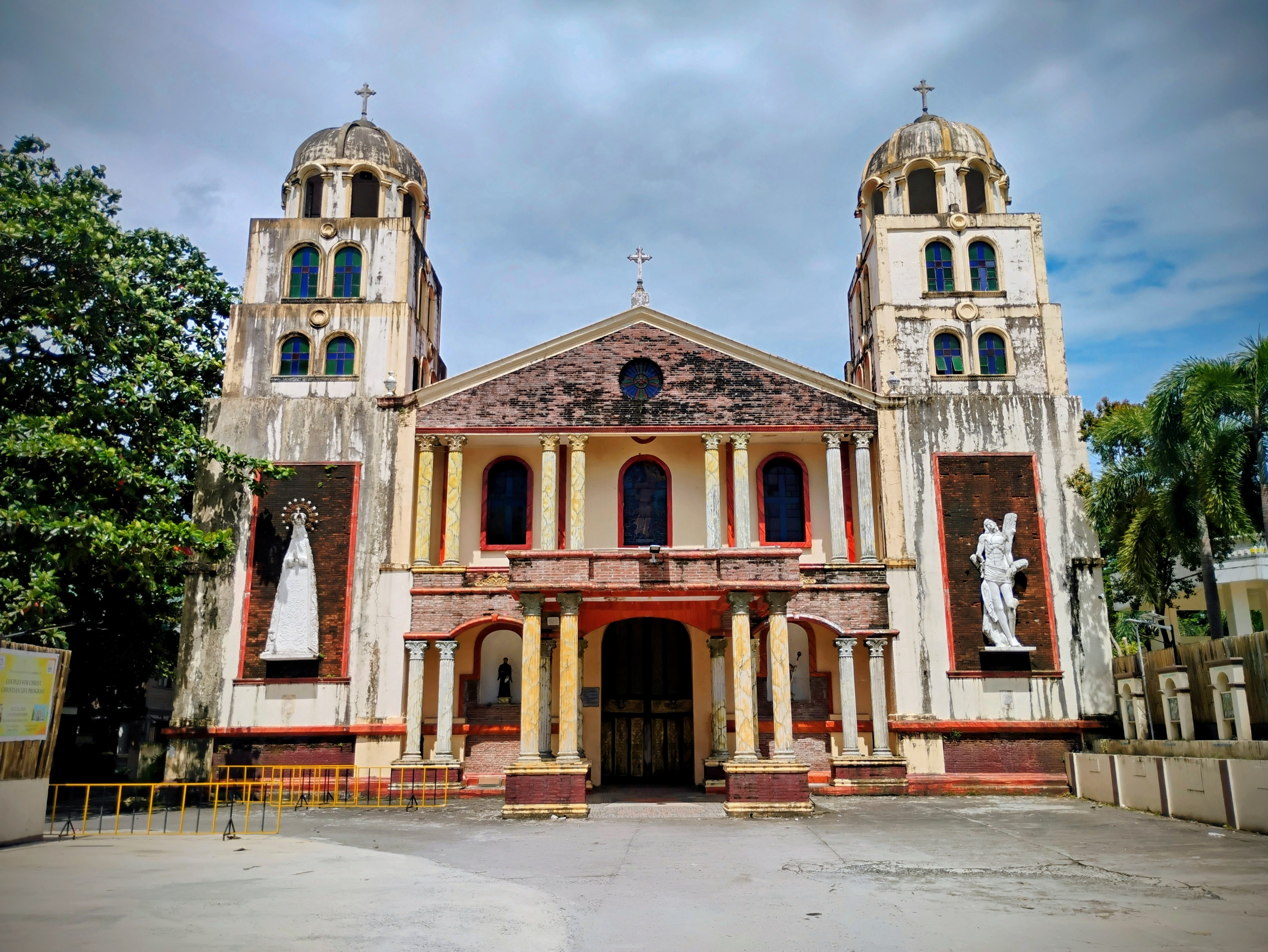
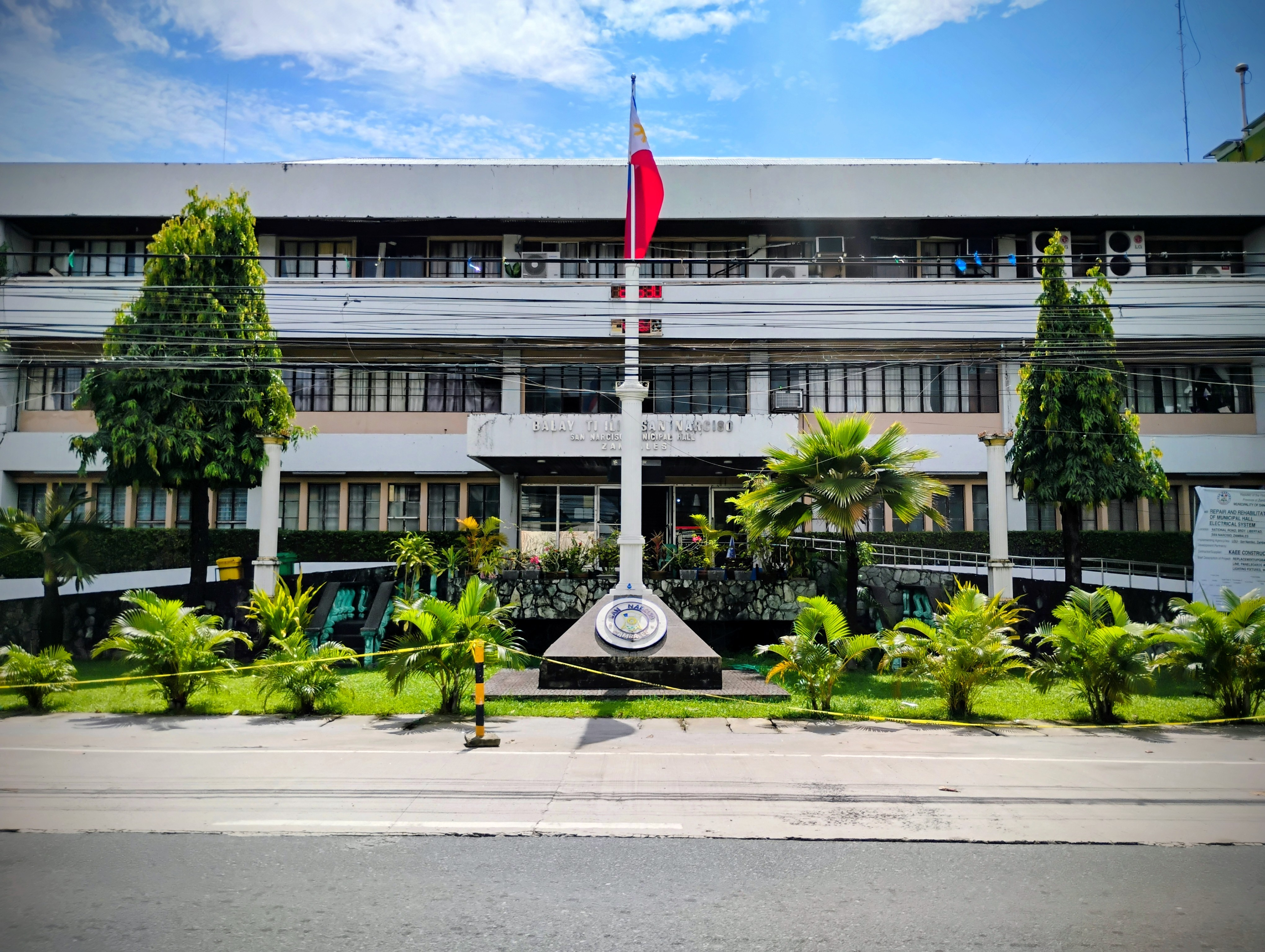
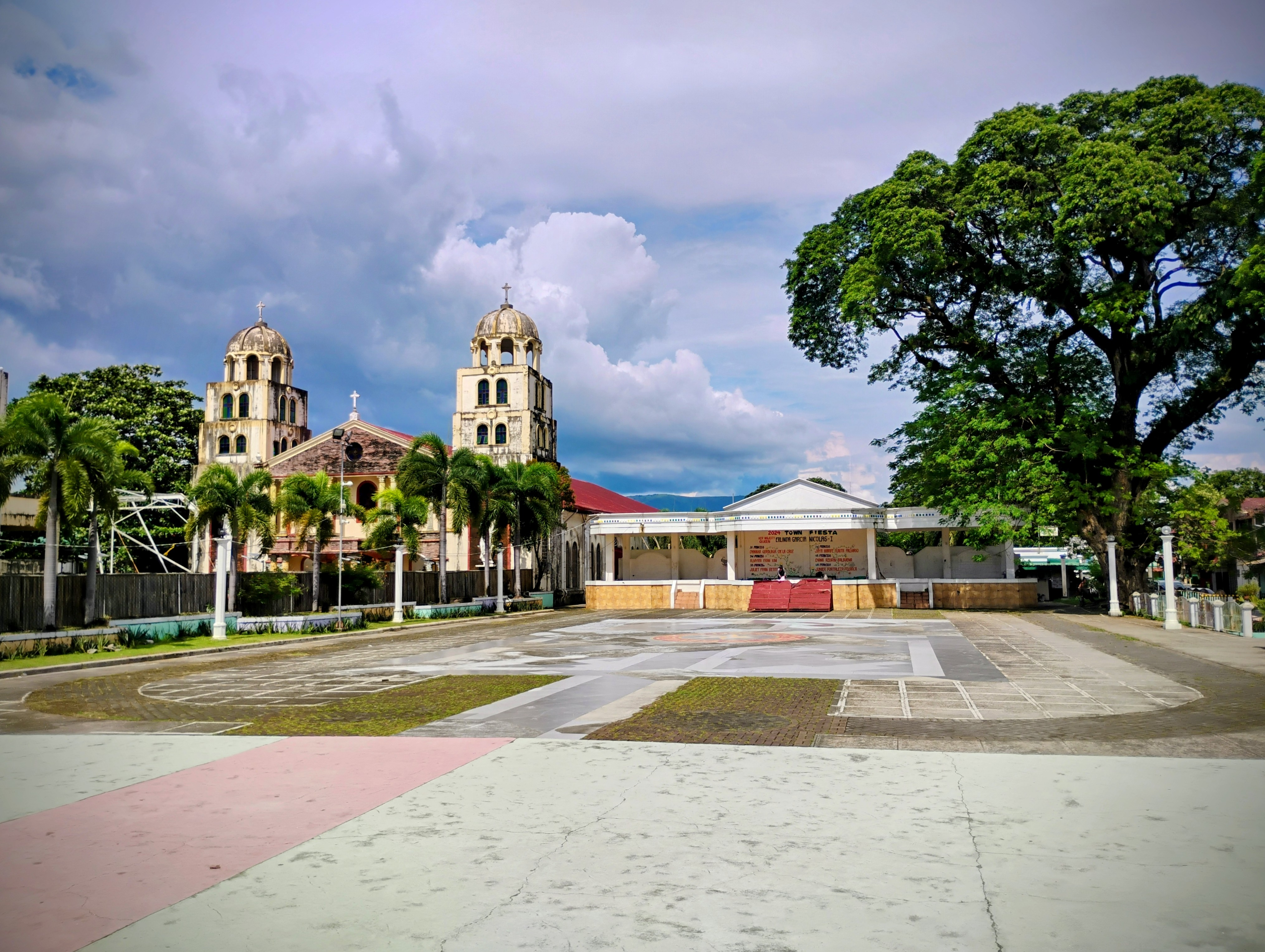
- San Sebastian Parish Church San Narciso Municipal Hall San Narciso Town Plaza

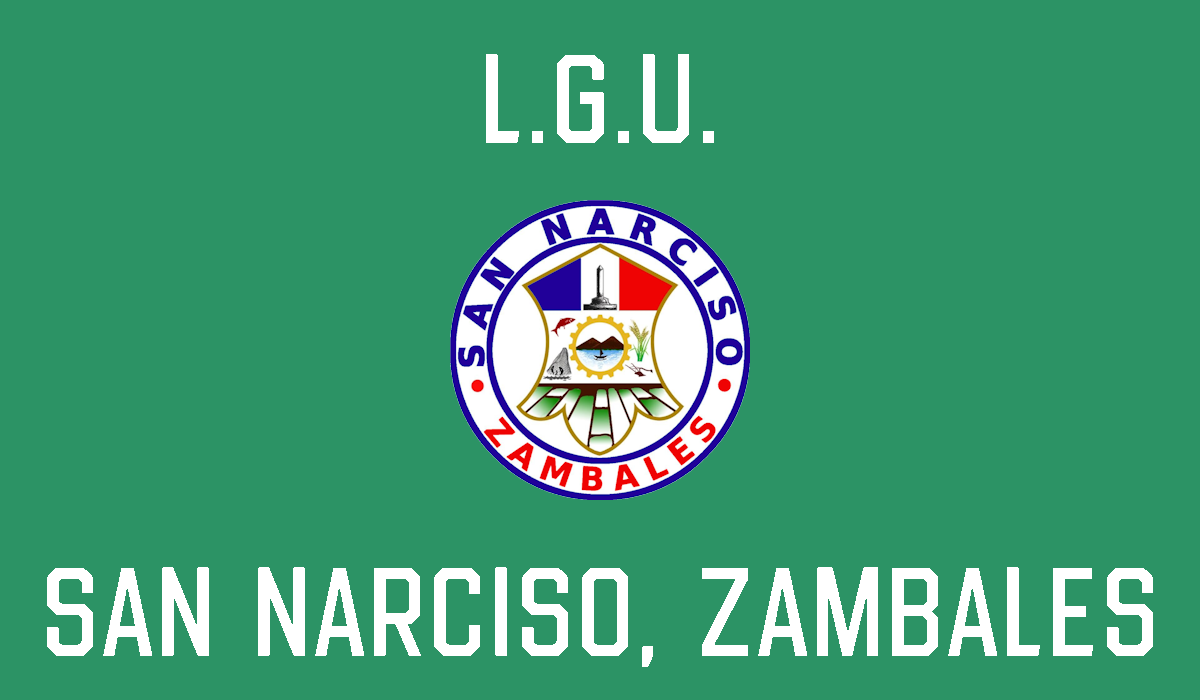
- Flag Seal

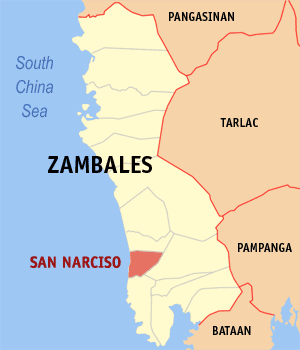
- Map of Zambales with San Narciso highlighted
- Interactive map of San Narciso
- Location within the Philippines
- Coordinates: 15°01′N 120°05′E
- Country: Philippines
- Region: Central Luzon
- Province: Zambales
- District: 2nd district
- Named for: Narciso Clavería y Zaldúa
- Barangays: 17 (see Barangays)

Government
  - Type: Sangguniang Bayan
  - Mayor: LaRaine Abad-Sarmiento
  - Vice Mayor: Lance Ritual
  - Representative: Doris E. Maniquiz
  - Municipal Council: Members: Jecyl M. Fran; Menandro M. Maybituin; Ferdinand V. Abinsay; Marie Christine R. Cabiles; Mhar Lhexter C. Cabaltica; Peter T. Lim; Sebastian F. Arechea; Jun V. Tamayo
  - Electorate: 20,167 voters (2025)

Area
  - Total: 71.60 km^{2} (27.64 sq mi)
- Elevation: 12 m (39 ft)
- Highest elevation: 182 m (597 ft)
- Lowest elevation: 0 m (0 ft)

Population (2024 census)
  - Total: 32,180
  - Density: 449.4/km^{2} (1,164/sq mi)
  - Households: 8,397

Economy
  - Income class: 3rd municipal income class
  - Poverty incidence: 9.86% (2023)
  - Revenue: ₱ 176.8 million (2024)
  - Assets: ₱ 584.2 million (2024)
  - Expenditure: ₱ 130.2 million (2024)
  - Liabilities: ₱ 90.28 million (2024)

Service provider
  - Electricity: Zambales 2 Electric Cooperative (ZAMECO 2)
- Time zone: UTC+8 (PST)
- ZIP code: 2205
- PSGC: 0307112000
- IDD : area code: +63 (0)47
- Native languages: Ilocano; Tagalog; Sambal

San Narciso, officially the Municipality of San Narciso (Ilocano: Ili ti San Narciso; Tagalog: Bayan ng San Narciso; Sambal: Babali nin San Narciso), is a municipality in the province of Zambales, Philippines. According to the 2024 census, it has a population of 32,180 people.

== History ==
The Municipality of San Narciso was founded in the early part of 18th century. The migrants from the Ilocandia arrived in the area and established their settlement in Alusiis which was the first name of the pueblo that later became San Narciso.

San Narciso became the official name of the town by a Royal Decree issued by the Spanish Governor General Narciso Claveria and Archbishop Jose Soque on February 12, 1846.

The people of San Narciso participated in the Philippine Revolution against Spain. When the Katipunan was organized by Andres Bonifacio and sent his representatives to San Narciso, many prominent men of the town became members. Pantaleon Dumlao became the head of the local organization.

== Geography ==
San Narciso is located in a relatively flat plain. West of the town is the South China Sea and to the east is bordered by the Sto. Tomas river are the Zambales Mountain Ranges. Average elevation is 3.6 metres (12 ft) above sea level and the highest elevation is 800 metres (2,600 ft) above sea level.

It is 41 kilometres (25 mi) from Iba, 37 kilometres (23 mi) from Olongapo, and 163 kilometres (101 mi) from Manila. It is between San Antonio and San Felipe on the Olongapo–Bugallon Road.

=== Barangays ===
San Narciso is subdivided into 17 barangays, as indicated below. Each barangay consists of puroks and some have sitios.

- Alusiis
- Beddeng
- Candelaria (Poblacion)
- Dallipawen
- Grullo
- La Paz
- Libertad (Poblacion)
- Namatacan
- Natividad (Poblacion)
- Omaya
- Paite
- Patrocinio (Poblacion)
- San Jose (Poblacion)
- San Juan (Poblacion)
- San Pascual (Poblacion)
- San Rafael (Poblacion)
- Siminublan

=== Climate ===
Climate data for San Narciso
Month	Jan	Feb	Mar	Apr	May	Jun	Jul	Aug	Sep	Oct	Nov	Dec	Year
Mean daily maximum °C (°F)	30.9 (87.6)	31.7 (89.1)	32.9 (91.2)	34.0 (93.2)	33.5 (92.3)	31.7 (89.1)	30.9 (87.6)	30.1 (86.2)	30.7 (87.3)	31.5 (88.7)	31.5 (88.7)	31.1 (88.0)	31.7 (89.1)
Daily mean °C (°F)	26.1 (79.0)	26.6 (79.9)	27.7 (81.9)	29.0 (84.2)	29.1 (84.4)	27.9 (82.2)	27.4 (81.3)	26.9 (80.4)	27.2 (81.0)	27.5 (81.5)	27.2 (81.0)	26.6 (79.9)	27.4 (81.4)
Mean daily minimum °C (°F)	21.4 (70.5)	21.5 (70.7)	22.6 (72.7)	24.1 (75.4)	24.7 (76.5)	24.2 (75.6)	23.9 (75.0)	23.8 (74.8)	23.7 (74.7)	23.6 (74.5)	23.0 (73.4)	22.1 (71.8)	23.2 (73.8)
Average rainfall mm (inches)	3 (0.1)	3 (0.1)	7 (0.3)	25 (1.0)	212 (8.3)	555 (21.9)	701 (27.6)	1,041 (41.0)	563 (22.2)	234 (9.2)	74 (2.9)	20 (0.8)	3,438 (135.4)
Source: Climate-Data.org

San Narciso has a tropical monsoon climate (Am) with little to no rainfall from November to April and heavy to extremely heavy rainfall from May to October.

== Demographics ==
Population census of San Narciso
Year	Pop.	±% p.a.
1903	7,528	—
1918	8,779	+1.03%
1939	9,723	+0.49%
1948	14,085	+4.20%
1960	14,993	+0.52%
1970	17,622	+1.63%
1975	19,278	+1.82%
1980	19,119	−0.17%
1990	22,891	+1.82%
1995	21,651	−1.04%
2000	23,522	+1.79%
2007	24,856	+0.76%
2010	26,966	+3.01%
2015	28,360	+0.96%
2020	30,759	+1.72%
2024	32,180	+1.09%
Source: Philippine Statistics Authority

In the 2024 census, the population of San Narciso was 32,180 people, with a density of 450 inhabitants per square kilometre or 1,200 inhabitants per square mile.

== Economy ==
Poverty incidence of San Narciso (%)

Source: Philippine Statistics Authority

The town is mostly agricultural with most families owning farmland to plant rice and other crops such as string beans, onions and other vegetables. Commerce is centered in the town center and the public market. There are also a number of poultry and pig farms in the municipality mostly located in the outskirts. In recent years, tourism has increased in the municipality. Due to its close proximity to Manila which is just a 3-hour drive away, many residents of the capital visit its beaches specially around summertime. This in effect has increased the economic activity in the municipality and have provided jobs and opportunities to its residents.

== Culture ==
The first settlers of San Narciso came from Paoay, Ilocos Norte and Agno, Pangasinan which was then a part of Zambales. They brought forth with them customs and traditions such as honoring their dead through prayers and novenas. Family members and relatives come together to offer prayers and recite names of deceased relatives. One unique part about these practices is the serving of food, usually pancit, puto and ginataang bilo-bilo or what locals call tambo-tambong. It is a local delicacy made from glutinous rice balls, cassava, banana, jackfruit, coconut milk and tapioca pearls.

== Government ==
=== List of local chief executives ===
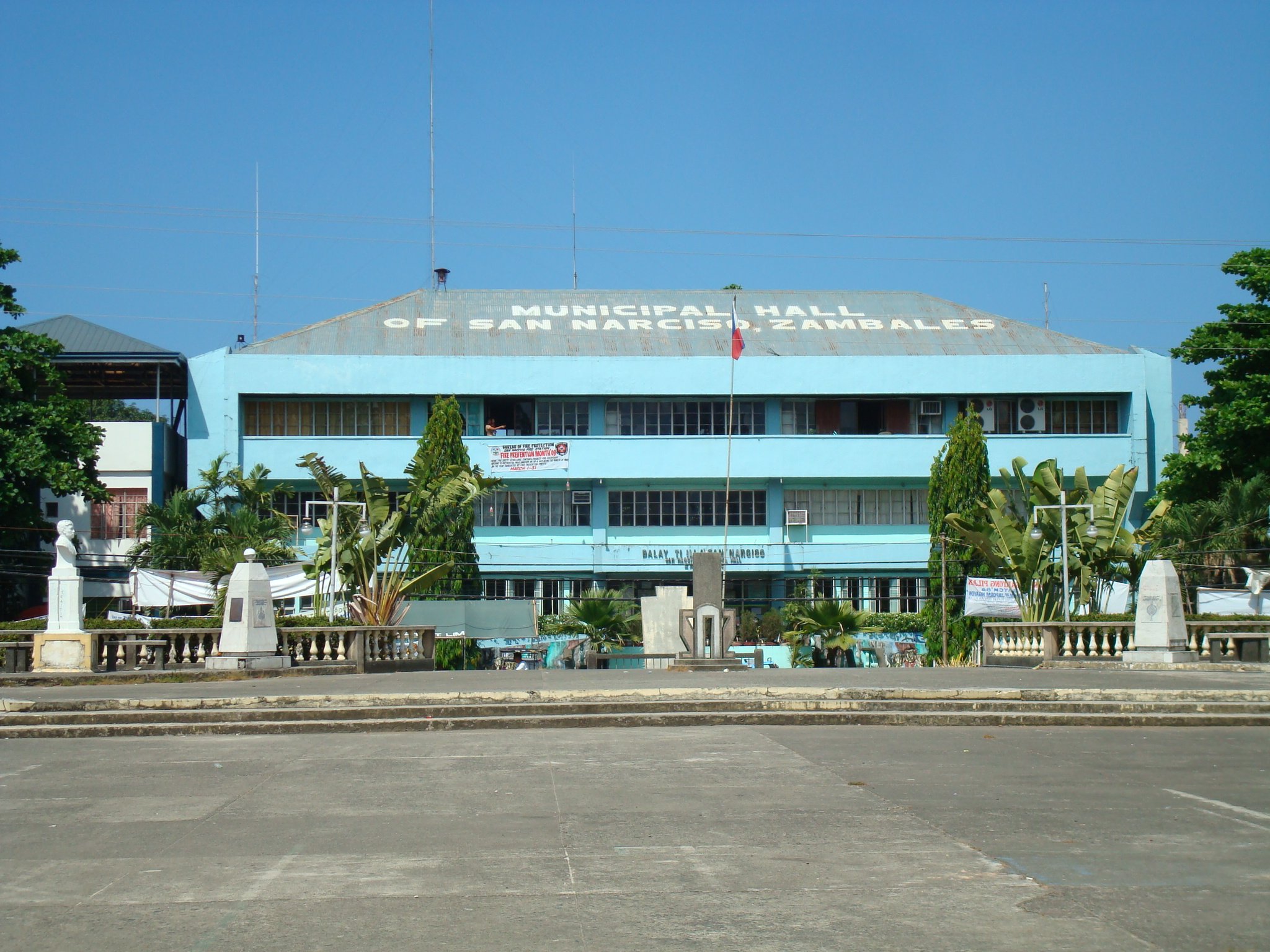
Municipal Building

Spanish regime

- 1884 Tomas Bernabe Gobernadorcillo
- 1886 Mariano Apolinario Gobernadorcillo
- 1887 Paulo Fogata Gobernadorcillo
- 1888 Esteban Foton Gobernadorcillo
- 1889 Mariano Marañon Gobernadorcillo
- 1890 Francisco Fajarito Gobernadorcillo
- 1891 Gregorio Farañal Gobernadorcillo
- 1892 Leocadio Firme Gobernadorcillo
- 1893 Juan Flordeliza Dumlao Gobernadorcillo
- 1894 Quirico Amon Sr. Gobernadorcillo
- 1895 Luis Fogata Gobernadorcillo
- 1895 Cipriano Fogata Gobernadorcillo

Revolutionary government

- 1897 Cipriano Fernandez Capitan Municipal
- 1898 Casamiro Amon Capitan Municipal 1
- 1900 Vicente Posadas Capitan Municipal

American regime

- 1903–1904 Simeon Marañon Presidente Municipal
- 1905–1906 Angel Dumlao Presidente Municipal
- June 1906-Jan. 8, 1908 Simeon Villanueva Presidente Municipal
- June 9, 1908-Dec. 1909 Angle Dumlao Presidente Municipal
- 1910–1912 Victor Amos Presidente Municipal
- 1912–1916 Mariano Villanueva Presidente Municipal
- 1916–1919 Marcos Fuerte Presidente Municipal
- 1919–1922 Severino Fuertes Presidente Municipal
- 1922–1925 Paulino Delos Santos Presidente Municipal
- 1926–1931 Esteban Florita Presidente Municipal
- 1932–1934 Donato Amon Presidente Municipal

Commonwealth

- 1934–1940 Ireneo Delos Reyes Municipal Mayor
- 1941-Oct. 1942 Pacifico Fuerte Municipal Mayor

Japanese Occupation

- Oct. 1942–1944 Sebastian Fogata Municipal Mayor

Liberation Military Government

- February 1945 Gerardo Evangelista Municipal Mayor
- May 1945 – July 1946 Pacifico Fuerte Municipal Mayor
- 1947–1948 Severino Fuertes Municipal Mayor

Republic of the Philippines

- Aug. 1948–1955 Sebastian Fogata Municipal Mayor
- Jan. 1956–1960 Jose Delos Santos Municipal Mayor
- Jan. 1960–1963 Sebastian Fogata Municipal Mayor
- Jan. 1963–1986 Francisco A. Galvez, Jr. Municipal Mayor
- 1986–1989 Quirico F. Abrajano, Jr. Municipal Mayor
- 1989–1992 Francisco A. Galvez, Jr. Municipal Mayor
- 1992–2001 Quirico F. Abrajano, Jr. Municipal Mayor
- 2001 – 2010 William T. Lim Municipal Mayor
- 2010 - 2016 Peter T. Lim Municipal Mayor
- 2016 to 2019 La Rainne Abad-Sarmiento Municipal Mayor
- 2019 to 2022 William T. Lim Municipal Mayor
- 2022 to present La Rainne Abad-Sarmiento Municipal Mayor

== Tourism ==
San Narciso is famous for its beaches located in the west coast of Luzon, facing the South China Sea that are suited for surfing.

== Education ==
The San Narciso Schools District Office governs all educational institutions within the municipality. It oversees the management and operations of all private and public, from primary to secondary schools.

The Philippine Merchant Marine Academy or PMMA is located here. San Narciso also houses the Magsaysay Memorial College of Zambales, Inc, which offers elementary and secondary education, bachelors courses and other 2-year courses. Also located in San Narciso is the Zambales Academy, one of the oldest secondary education institutions in the province. It is where former president Ramon Magsaysay took his secondary education.

=== Primary and elementary schools ===
- Alusiis Elementary School
- Beddeng-Mabangcal Elementary School
- Consuelo Elementary School
- Dallipawen Elementary School
- Doce-Martires Elementary School
- Good Shepherd Ecumenical Learning Center
- La Paz Elementary School
- Living Hope Zambales Christian Academy
- Mabato Elementary School
- Namatacan Elementary School
- Omaya Elementary School
- Rivers of Joy Christian School
- San Jose-Patrocinio Elementary School
- San Juan-Candelaria Elementary School
- San Narciso Elementary School
- San Pascual Elementary School
- San Rafael-Natividad Elementary School
- Simminublan Elementary School

=== Secondary schools ===
- La Paz National High School
- Namatacan National High School
- Paite-Balincaguing National High School
- Consuelo Integrated School
- Magsaysay Memorial College of Zambales
- Zambales Academy

=== Higher educational institution ===
- Magsaysay Memorial College of Zambales Inc.

== Notable personalities ==
- Boobay - actor, comedian, and television host.
