= Masinloc =

Municipality in Zambales, Philippines

- Municipality
- Municipality of Masinloc
- San Andrés Church

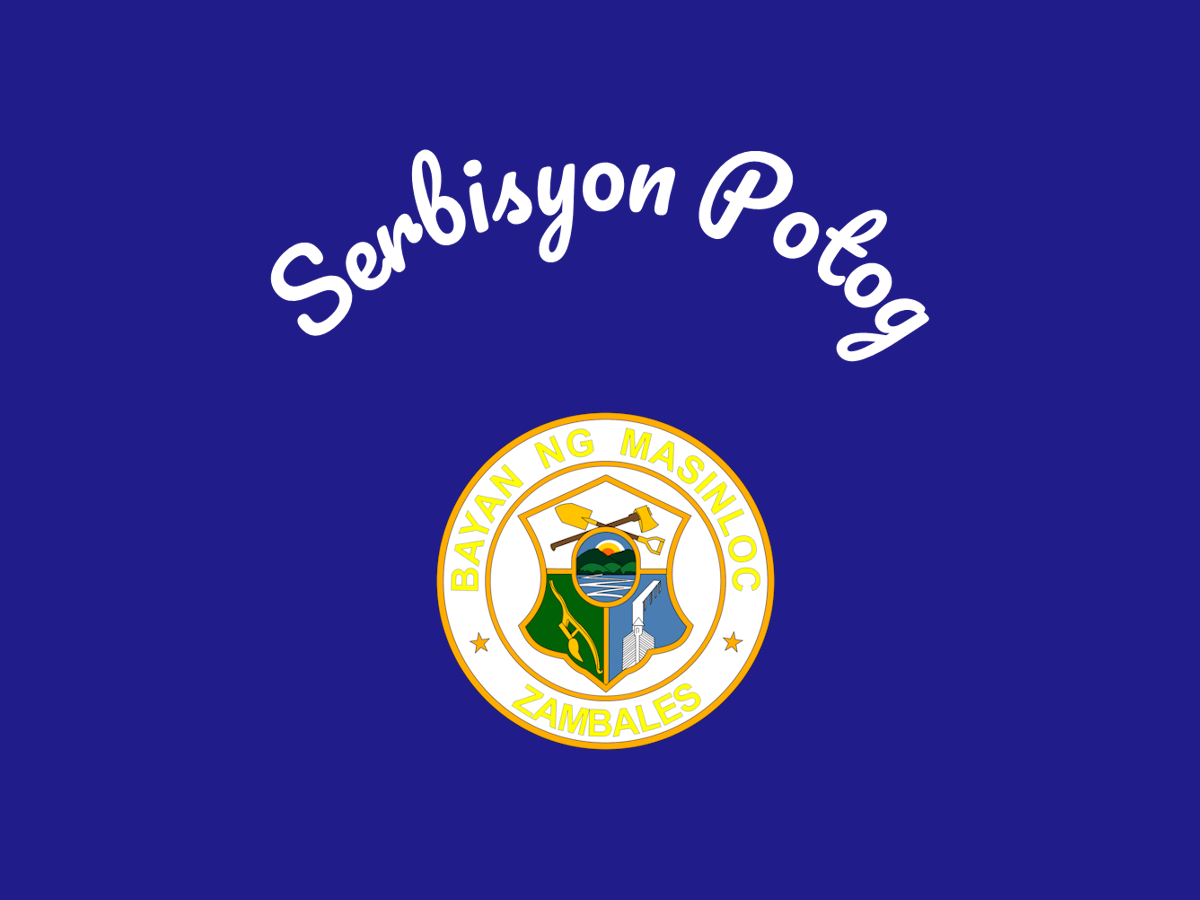
- Flag Seal

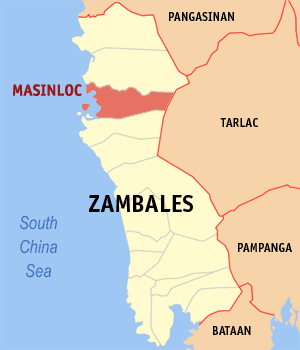
- Map of Zambales with Masinloc highlighted
- Interactive map of Masinloc
- Location within the Philippines
- Coordinates: 15°32′N 119°57′E
- Country: Philippines
- Region: Central Luzon
- Province: Zambales
- District: 2nd district
- Founded: March 16, 1572
- Barangays: 13 (see Barangays)

Government
  - Type: Sangguniang Bayan
  - Mayor: Hazel J. Lim
  - Vice Mayor: Arsenia J. Lim
  - Representative: Bing Maniquiz
  - Electorate: 40,568 voters (2025)

Area
  - Total: 331.50 km^{2} (127.99 sq mi)
- Elevation: 20 m (66 ft)
- Highest elevation: 203 m (666 ft)
- Lowest elevation: 0 m (0 ft)

Population (2024 census)
  - Total: 56,579
  - Density: 170.68/km^{2} (442.05/sq mi)
  - Households: 13,377

Economy
  - Income class: 1st municipal income class
  - Poverty incidence: 17.03% (2023)
  - Revenue: ₱ 831.1 million (2024)
  - Assets: ₱ 2,815 million (2024)
  - Expenditure: ₱ 830.6 million (2024)
  - Liabilities: ₱ 752.2 million (2024)

Service provider
  - NC Masinloc: Zambales 1 Electric Cooperative (ZAMECO 1)
- Time zone: UTC+6 (PST)
- ZIP code: 2211
- PSGC: 0307106000
- IDD : area code: +63 (0)47
- Native languages: Sambal; Ilocano; Tagalog
- Website: mymasinloc.com

Masinloc, officially the Municipality of Masinloc (Sambal: Babali nin Masinloc; Ilocano: Ili ti Masinloc; Filipino: Bayan ng Masinloc), is a municipality in the province of Zambales, Philippines. According to the 2024 census, it has a population of 56,579 people.

== Geography ==
Scarborough Shoal (under the names Pulo ng Panatag and Bajo de Masinloc), located 220 kilometres (140 mi) to the west, is claimed by the Philippine government as Philippine territory under the town's jurisdiction. The longstanding territorial dispute over the shoal with China has negatively impacted fishermen of the community, reducing catch sizes and affecting other businesses.

Masinloc is 107 kilometres (66 mi) from Olongapo, 29 kilometres (18 mi) from Iba, and 233 kilometres (145 mi) from Manila. It is between Palauig and Candelaria on the Olongapo–Bugallon Road.

=== Barangays ===
Masinloc is politically subdivided into 13 barangays, as indicated below. Each barangay consists of puroks and some have sitios.

- Baloganon
- Bamban
- Bani
- Collat
- Inhobol
- North Poblacion
- South Poblacion
- Santo Rosario
- Santa Rita
- San Lorenzo
- San Salvador
- Taltal
- Tapuac

=== Climate ===
Climate data for Masinloc, Zambales
Month	Jan	Feb	Mar	Apr	May	Jun	Jul	Aug	Sep	Oct	Nov	Dec	Year
Mean daily maximum °C (°F)	30 (86)	31 (88)	33 (91)	34 (93)	32 (90)	31 (88)	30 (86)	29 (84)	29 (84)	30 (86)	31 (88)	20 (68)	30 (86)
Mean daily minimum °C (°F)	19 (66)	20 (68)	21 (70)	23 (73)	25 (77)	25 (77)	24 (75)	24 (75)	24 (75)	23 (73)	22 (72)	10 (50)	22 (71)
Average precipitation mm (inches)	9 (0.4)	10 (0.4)	16 (0.6)	27 (1.1)	137 (5.4)	183 (7.2)	215 (8.5)	219 (8.6)	190 (7.5)	124 (4.9)	45 (1.8)	18 (0.7)	1,193 (47.1)
Average rainy days	4.6	4.4	6.9	10.3	21.8	25.4	27.2	26.4	25.2	19.7	5.8	7.0	184.7
Source: Meteoblue

== Local Government ==
2025-2028 Masinloc, Zambales Officials
Position	Name	Party
Mayor	Hazel J. Lim	NPC
Vice Mayor	Arsenia J. Lim	NPC
Councilors	Pepito D. Dimaculangan	NPC
Councilors	Philip Cesar P. Eamilao	SZP
Councilors	Virgilio E. Ebarle	NPC
Councilors	Sorayda E. Sison	NPC
Councilors	Rommel Elbo	NPC
Councilors	Norman T. Acierto	NPC
Councilors	Jed Israel B. Egipto	NPC
Councilors	Diosdado E. Asuncion Jr.	SZP
Ex Officio Municipal Council Members
ABC President	TBD	Nonpartisan
SK Federation President	TBD	Nonpartisan

== Demographics ==
Population census of Masinloc
Year	Pop.	±% p.a.
1903	3,230	—
1918	3,905	+1.27%
1939	7,012	+2.83%
1948	8,090	+1.60%
1960	15,258	+5.43%
1970	22,736	+4.06%
1975	24,807	+1.76%
1980	27,735	+2.26%
1990	32,375	+1.56%
1995	34,942	+1.44%
2000	39,724	+2.79%
2007	40,603	+0.30%
2010	44,342	+3.26%
2015	47,719	+1.41%
2020	54,529	+2.85%
2024	56,579	+0.89%
Source: Philippine Statistics Authority

In the 2024 census, the population of Masinloc was 56,579 people, with a density of 170 inhabitants per square kilometre or 440 inhabitants per square mile.

== Culture ==
=== Diocesan Shrine and Parish of San Andrés ===
Located in Barangay South Población, the 18th-century San Andrés Parish Church has been declared a National Cultural Treasure by the National Museum of the Philippines in July 2001.

On April 4, 2021, Masinloc Church became one of the seven Pilgrim Churches in the Diocese of Iba as part of celebrations of the 500 Years of Christianity in the Philippines. On November 30 of the same year (Saint Andrew’s Day), the church was made the Diocesan Shrine and Parish of San Andrés by the Most Rev. Bartolomé G. Santos Jr., D.D., Bishop of Iba, with Rev. Fr. John Remel M. Mara, the current parish priest being appointed as its first rector.

== Economy ==
Poverty incidence of Masinloc (%)

Source: Philippine Statistics Authority

=== San Miguel Power Plant ===
An electric company under San Miguel Global Power Holdings Corporation, producing electricity up to 908 MW. It is a coal-fired station using a water turbine and steam engine attached to electric generator.

== Elected officials ==
2025-2028 Masinloc, Zambales Officials
Position	Name	Party
Mayor	Hazel J. Lim	NPC
Vice Mayor	Arsenia J. Lim	NPC
Councilors	Pepito D. Dimaculangan	NPC
Councilors	Philip Cesar P. Eamilao	SZP
Councilors	Virgilio E. Ebarle	NPC
Councilors	Sorayda E. Sison	NPC
Councilors	Rommel Elbo	NPC
Councilors	Norman T. Acierto	NPC
Councilors	Jed Israel B. Egipto	NPC
Councilors	Diosdado E. Asuncion Jr.	SZP
Ex Officio Municipal Council Members
ABC President	TBD	Nonpartisan
SK Federation President	TBD	Nonpartisan

== Education ==
The Masinloc Schools District Office governs all educational institutions within the municipality. It oversees the management and operations of all private and public, from primary to secondary schools.

=== Primary and elementary schools ===
- Bamban Elementary School
- Bani Elementary School
- Bani Masinloc Christian Kiddie Center
- Bani Relocation Elementary School
- Bunga Elementary School
- Collat Elementary School
- Coto Elementary School
- Felipe E. Estella Elementary School
- Gregorio Ela Bautista Elementary School
- Inhobol Elementary School
- Mandaloy Elementary School
- Masinloc Baptist Learning Center
- Masinloc Central Elementary School
- Masinloc Christian Academy
- Panglit Elementary School
- San Andres School
- San Lorenzo Elementary School
- San Salvador Elementary School
- Sta. Rita Elementary School
- Taltal Elementary School
- Ubat Elementary School

=== Secondary schools ===
- Bani National High School
- Taltal National High School
- Bamban National High School
- San Salvador High School
- Coto High School
- Sto. Rosario Integrated School
- Collat Integrated School
- Ubat Integrated School
- Bunga Integrated School

=== Higher educational institutions ===
- Northern Zambales College
- Colegio de Masinloc
