= Candelaria, Zambales =

Municipality in Zambales, Philippines

Candelaria
- Municipality
- Municipality of Candelaria
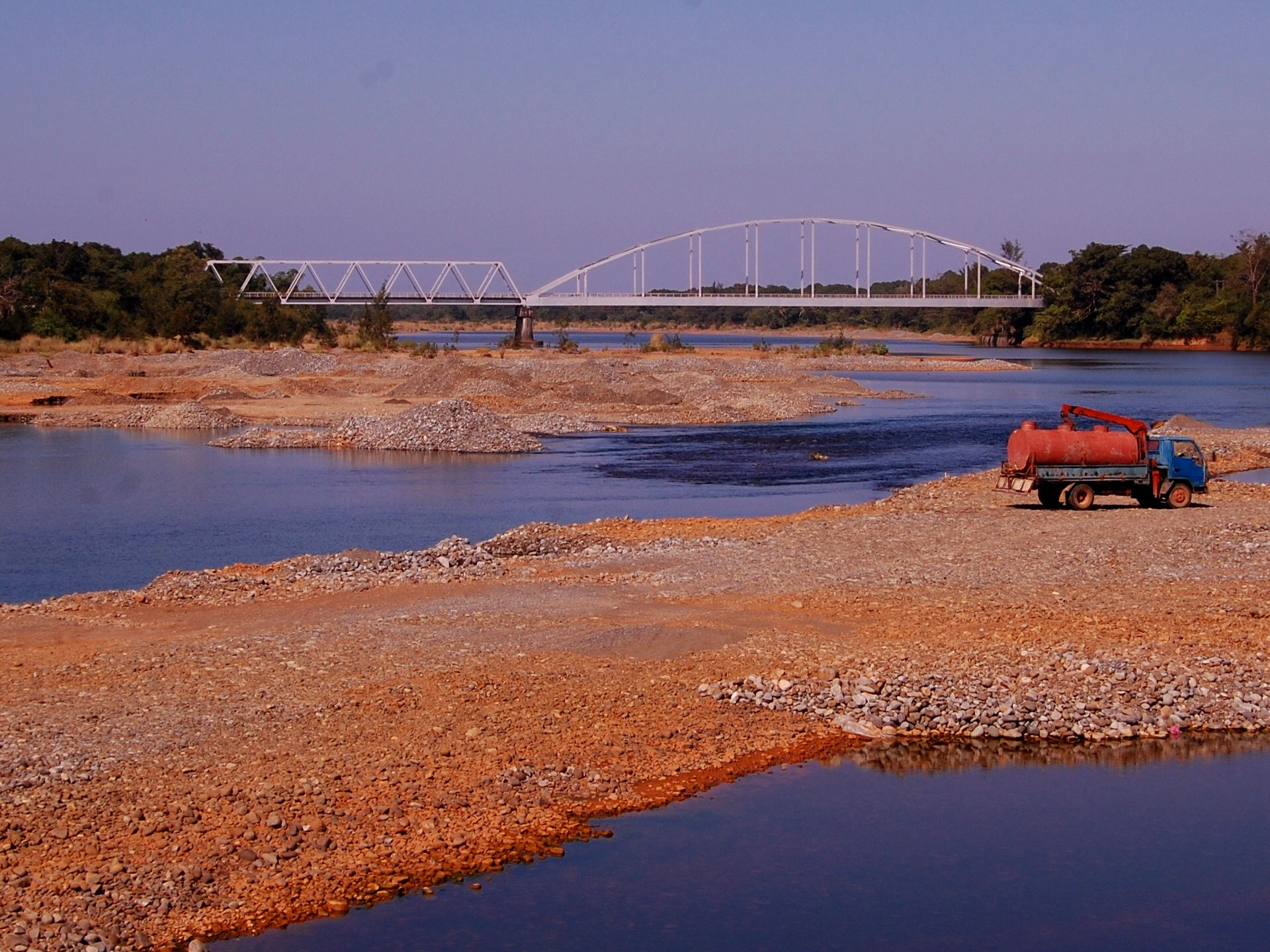
- Bridge of Candelaria

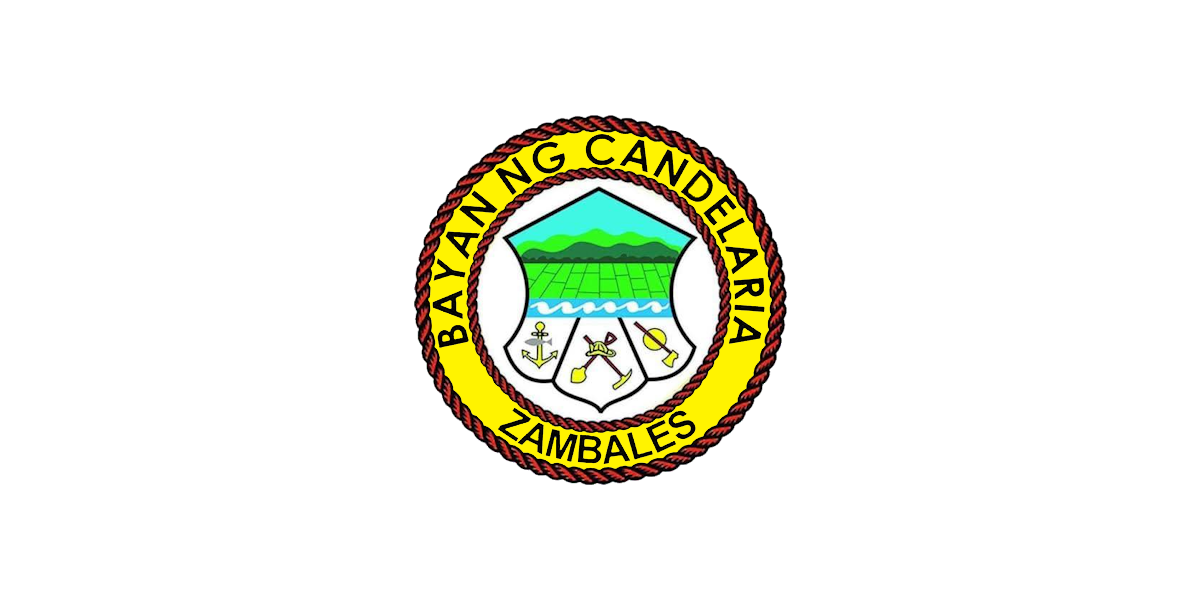
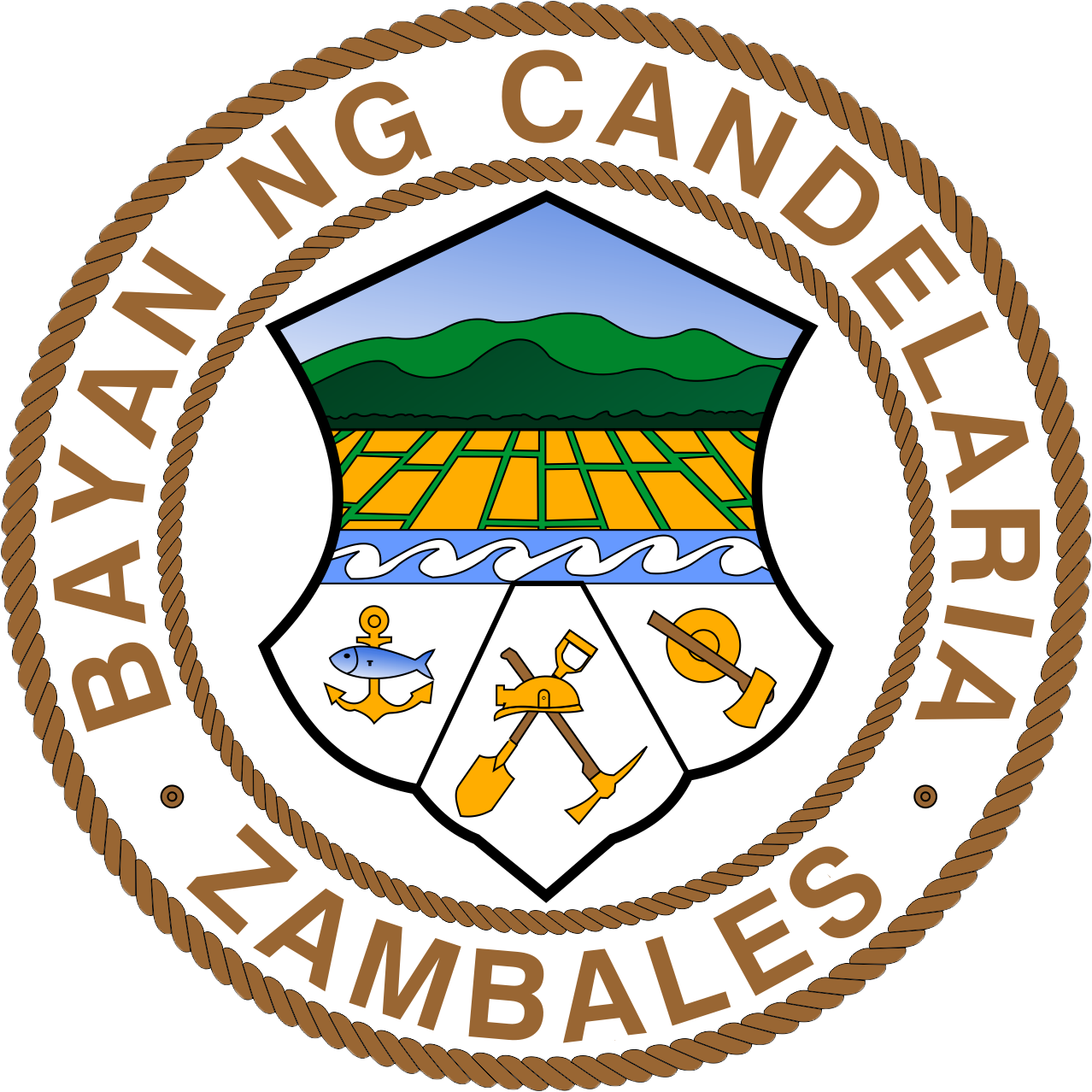
- Flag Seal

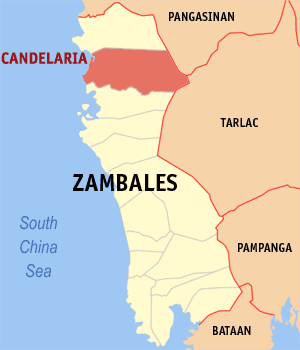
- Map of Zambales with Candelaria highlighted
- Interactive map of Candelaria
- Location within the Philippines
- Coordinates: 15°38′N 119°56′E
- Country: Philippines
- Region: Central Luzon
- Province: Zambales
- District: 2nd district
- Founded: 1870
- Reestablished: January 1, 1910
- Barangays: 16 (see Barangays)

Government
  - Type: Sangguniang Bayan
  - Mayor: Byron Jones E. Edquilang
  - Vice Mayor: Gilbert Hermoso
  - Representative: Doris Maniquiz
  - Municipal Council: Members: Ian Molino; Pedro Ecunar; Penny Ednave; Pico Echon; Franz Echon; Gil Ednave Jr.; Jun Angeles; Rena Estel
  - Electorate: 20,406 voters (2025)

Area
  - Total: 333.59 km^{2} (128.80 sq mi)
- Elevation: 13 m (43 ft)
- Highest elevation: 251 m (823 ft)
- Lowest elevation: 0 m (0 ft)

Population (2024 census)
  - Total: 32,182
  - Density: 96.472/km^{2} (249.86/sq mi)
  - Households: 7,110

Economy
  - Income class: 1st municipal income class
  - Poverty incidence: 15.79% (2023)
  - Revenue: ₱ 261.7 million (2024)
  - Assets: ₱ 735.4 million (2024)
  - Expenditure: ₱ 254.7 million (2024)
  - Liabilities: ₱ 180.7 million (2024)

Service provider
  - Electricity: Zambales 1 Electric Cooperative (ZAMECO 1)
- Time zone: UTC+8 (PST)
- ZIP code: 2212
- PSGC: 0307103000
- IDD : area code: +63 (0)47
- Native languages: Sambal; Ilocano; Tagalog
- Website: candelariazambales.gov.ph

Candelaria, officially the Municipality of Candelaria (Sambal: Babali nin Candelaria; Ilocano: Ili ti Candelaria; Filipino: Bayan ng Candelaria), is a 3rd class municipality in the province of Zambales, Philippines. According to the 2024 census, it has a population of 32,182 people.

== History ==
During the pre-Spanish era, the area of Candelaria was unsettled forest. The Spanish East Indies government made it a sitio of Masinloc, one of the oldest towns of Zambales. Sambal settlers from other parts of Masinloc, who found Candelaria an ideal location to live, played an important role in creating Candelaria as a separate town in 1870.

The name of the town could have come from the name of the wife of the first Alcalde Mayor, who named the town after her as a birthday gift. Candelaria is also the Spanish word for Candlemas, and that the Virgin of Candelaria is a Marian title popular in the Hispanic world.

== Geography ==
Candelaria is 118 kilometres (73 mi) from Olongapo, 40 kilometres (25 mi) from the capital town of Iba, 244 kilometres (152 mi) from Manila. It is between Masinloc and Santa Cruz on the Olongapo–Bugallon Road. It is nestled at the foot of the Zambales Mountains in the east and lies along coastline of the South China Sea in the west, with a total land area of 33,359 hectares (82,430 acres), making it the third-largest town in terms of land area in Zambales. This municipality is known for Uacon Lake, the cleanest lake in Central Luzon, and for its numerous beach resorts.

=== Barangays ===
Candelaria is politically subdivided into 16 barangays. Each barangay consists of puroks and some have sitios.

- Babancal
- Binabalian
- Catol
- Dampay
- Lauis
- Libertador
- Malabon (San Roque)
- Malimanga
- Pamibian
- Panayonan
- Pinagrealan
- Poblacion
- Sinabacan
- Taposo
- Uacon
- Yamot

=== Climate ===
Climate data for Candelaria, Zambales
| Month | Jan | Feb | Mar | Apr | May | Jun | Jul | Aug | Sep | Oct | Nov | Dec | Year |
|---|---|---|---|---|---|---|---|---|---|---|---|---|---|
| Mean daily maximum °C (°F) | 30 (86) | 32 (90) | 33 (91) | 34 (93) | 32 (90) | 31 (88) | 30 (86) | 29 (84) | 29 (84) | 30 (86) | 31 (88) | 30 (86) | 31 (88) |
| Mean daily minimum °C (°F) | 19 (66) | 20 (68) | 21 (70) | 23 (73) | 25 (77) | 25 (77) | 24 (75) | 24 (75) | 24 (75) | 23 (73) | 22 (72) | 20 (68) | 23 (72) |
| Average precipitation mm (inches) | 9 (0.4) | 10 (0.4) | 16 (0.6) | 27 (1.1) | 137 (5.4) | 183 (7.2) | 215 (8.5) | 219 (8.6) | 190 (7.5) | 124 (4.9) | 45 (1.8) | 18 (0.7) | 1,193 (47.1) |
| Average rainy days | 4.6 | 4.4 | 6.9 | 10.3 | 21.8 | 25.4 | 27.2 | 26.4 | 25.2 | 19.7 | 13.8 | 7.0 | 192.7 |
Source: Meteoblue (Use with caution: this is modeled/calculated data, not measured locally.)

== Demographics ==
Population census of Candelaria
| Year | Pop. | ±% p.a. |
|---|---|---|
| 1903 | 3,104 | — |
| 1918 | 4,252 | +2.12% |
| 1939 | 5,682 | +1.39% |
| 1948 | 7,167 | +2.61% |
| 1960 | 9,799 | +2.64% |
| 1970 | 12,376 | +2.36% |
| 1975 | 14,630 | +3.41% |
| 1980 | 15,686 | +1.40% |
| 1990 | 18,539 | +1.69% |
| 1995 | 20,201 | +1.62% |
| 2000 | 23,399 | +3.20% |
| 2007 | 24,243 | +0.49% |
| 2010 | 25,020 | +1.15% |
| 2015 | 27,174 | +1.59% |
| 2020 | 30,263 | +2.29% |
| 2024 | 32,182 | +1.49% |
Source: Philippine Statistics Authority

In the 2024 census, the population of Candelaria was 32,182 people, with a density of 96 inhabitants per square kilometre or 250 inhabitants per square mile.

== Economy ==
Poverty incidence of Candelaria (%)

Source: Philippine Statistics Authority

== Education ==
The Candelaria Schools District Office governs all educational institutions within the municipality. It oversees the management and operations of all private and public, from primary to secondary schools.

=== Primary and elementary schools ===
- Amado Barrera Educational Center
- Babancal Elementary School
- Binabalian Elementary School
- Candelaria Central School
- Catol Elementary School
- Dampay Elementary School
- Florida Orias Baylon Ecumenical Learning Center
- Geronimo Eduarda Ballesteros Cayaban Ecumenical Learning Center
- Lauis Elementary School
- Libertador Elementary School
- Malimanga Elementary School
- Pinagrealan Elementary School
- San Roque Elementary School
- San Roque Elementary School (Annex)
- Sinabacan Elementary School
- St. Vincent's Academy
- Taposo Elementary School
- Yamot Elementary School

=== Secondary schools ===
- Candelaria School of Fisheries
- Lauis National High School
- Pamibian Integrated School
- Uacon Integrated School

=== Technical schools ===
- Candelaria School of Fisheries
- Power Skills Technical Institute
