= Cabangan =

Municipality in Zambales, Philippines

Cabangan Bayan ng Cabangan (Tagalog) Cabangaan
- Municipality
- Municipality of Cabangan
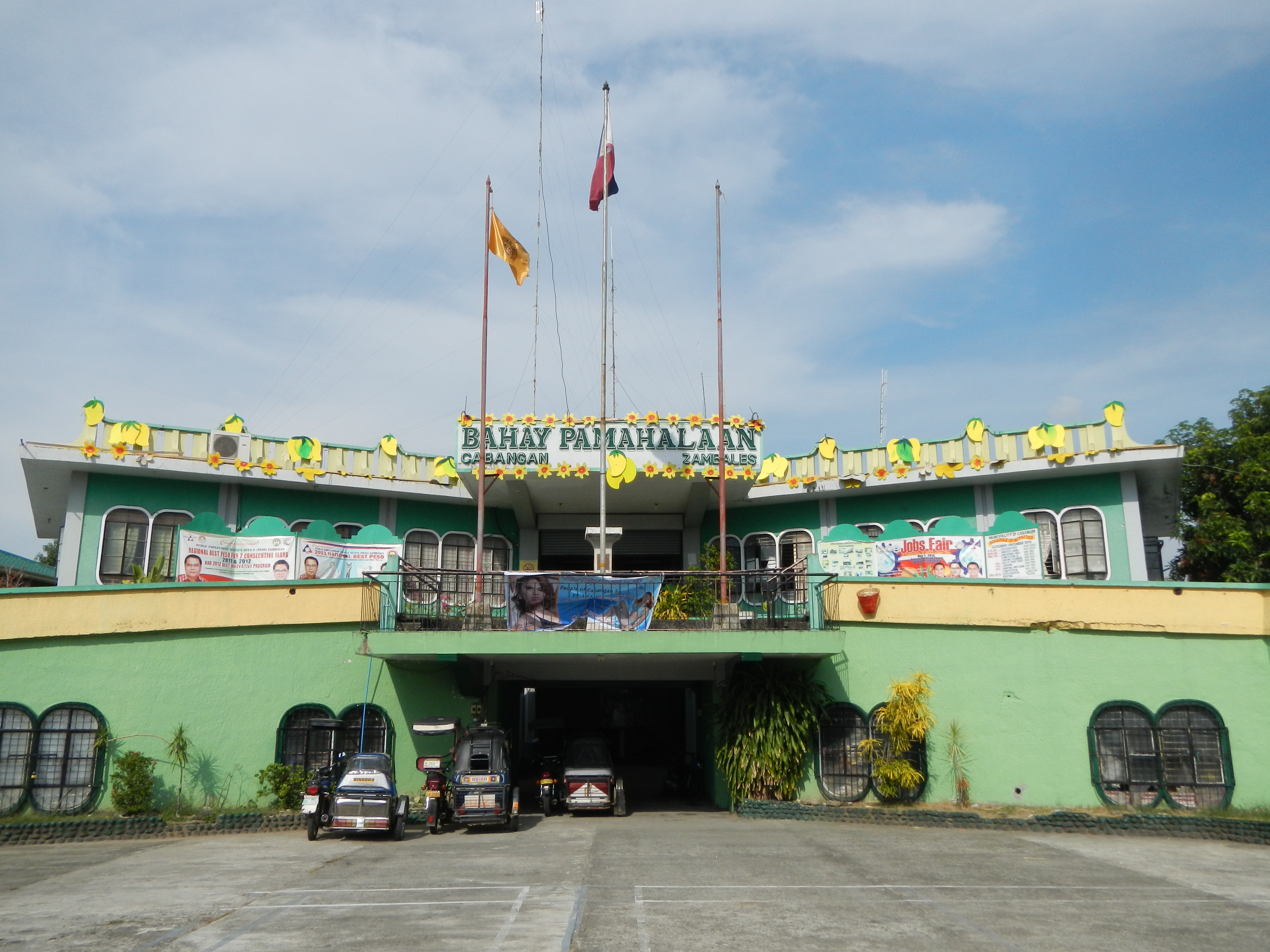
- Bahay Pamahalaan (Municipal Hall)

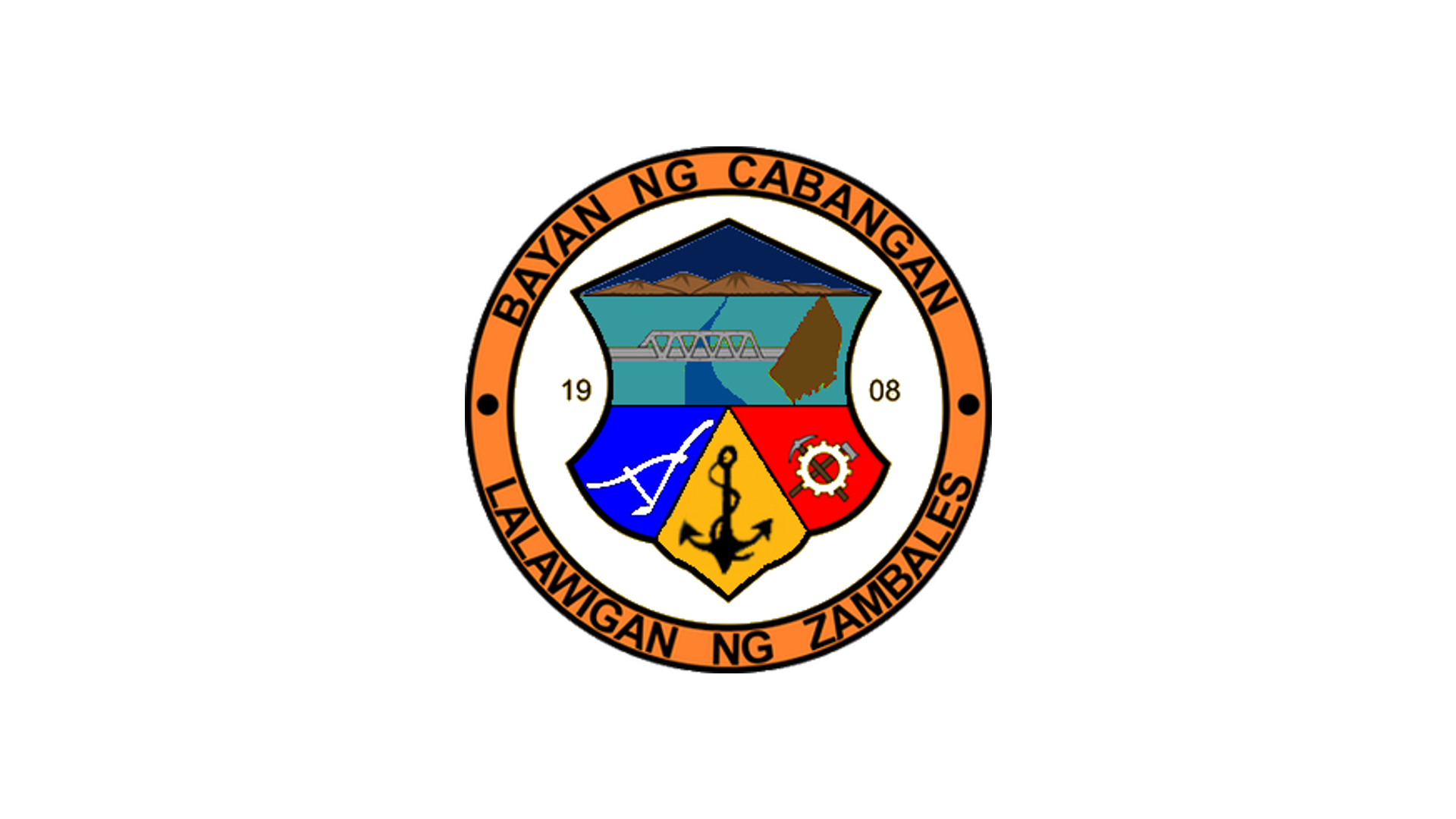
- Flag Seal
- Motto: Ako, Ikaw, Tayo ang Kailangan ng Cabangan.
- Anthem: Cabangan March
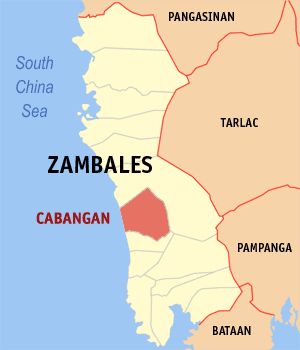
- Map of Zambales with Cabangan highlighted
- Interactive map of Cabangan
- Location within the Philippines
- Coordinates: 15°08′N 120°09′E
- Country: Philippines
- Region: Central Luzon
- Province: Zambales
- District: 2nd district
- Founded: 1680
- Liberated from Botolan: 1908
- Named for: Banga-shaped trees.
- Barangays: 22 (see Barangays)

Government
  - Type: Sangguniang Bayan
  - Mayor: Ronaldo F. Apostol
  - Vice Mayor: Leo F. Bringas
  - Representative: Doris E. Maniquiz
  - Municipal Council: Members: Mira R. de Guzman; Leilani G. Ignacio; Larry D. Alip; Augusto F. Gelacio; Noel A. Antonio; Leo B. Calderon; Leonardo V. Toledo; Teofilo D. Ronquillo
  - Electorate: 19,460 voters (2025)

Area
  - Total: 175.29 km^{2} (67.68 sq mi)
- Elevation: 57 m (187 ft)
- Highest elevation: 492 m (1,614 ft)
- Lowest elevation: 0 m (0 ft)

Population (2024 census)
  - Total: 29,334
  - Density: 167.35/km^{2} (433.42/sq mi)
  - Households: 6,957

Economy
  - Income class: 2nd municipal income class
  - Poverty incidence: 18.94% (2023)
  - Revenue: ₱ 189.2 million (2024)
  - Assets: ₱ 429.1 million (2024)
  - Expenditure: ₱ 172.6 million (2024)
  - Liabilities: ₱ 142.6 million (2024)

Service provider
  - Electricity: Zambales 2 Electric Cooperative (ZAMECO 2)
- Time zone: UTC+8 (PST)
- ZIP code: 2203
- PSGC: 0307102000
- IDD : area code: +63 (0)47
- Native languages: Botolan; Sambal; Ilocano; Tagalog

Cabangan, officially the Municipality of Cabangan, is a municipality in the province of Zambales, Philippines. According to the 2024 census, it has a population of 29,334 people.

== Etymology ==
The area was first called Cabangaan after the banga-shaped fruits of the abundant palm trees. When Americans arrived, they mispronounced it as Cabangan, a name that later became permanent.

== History ==
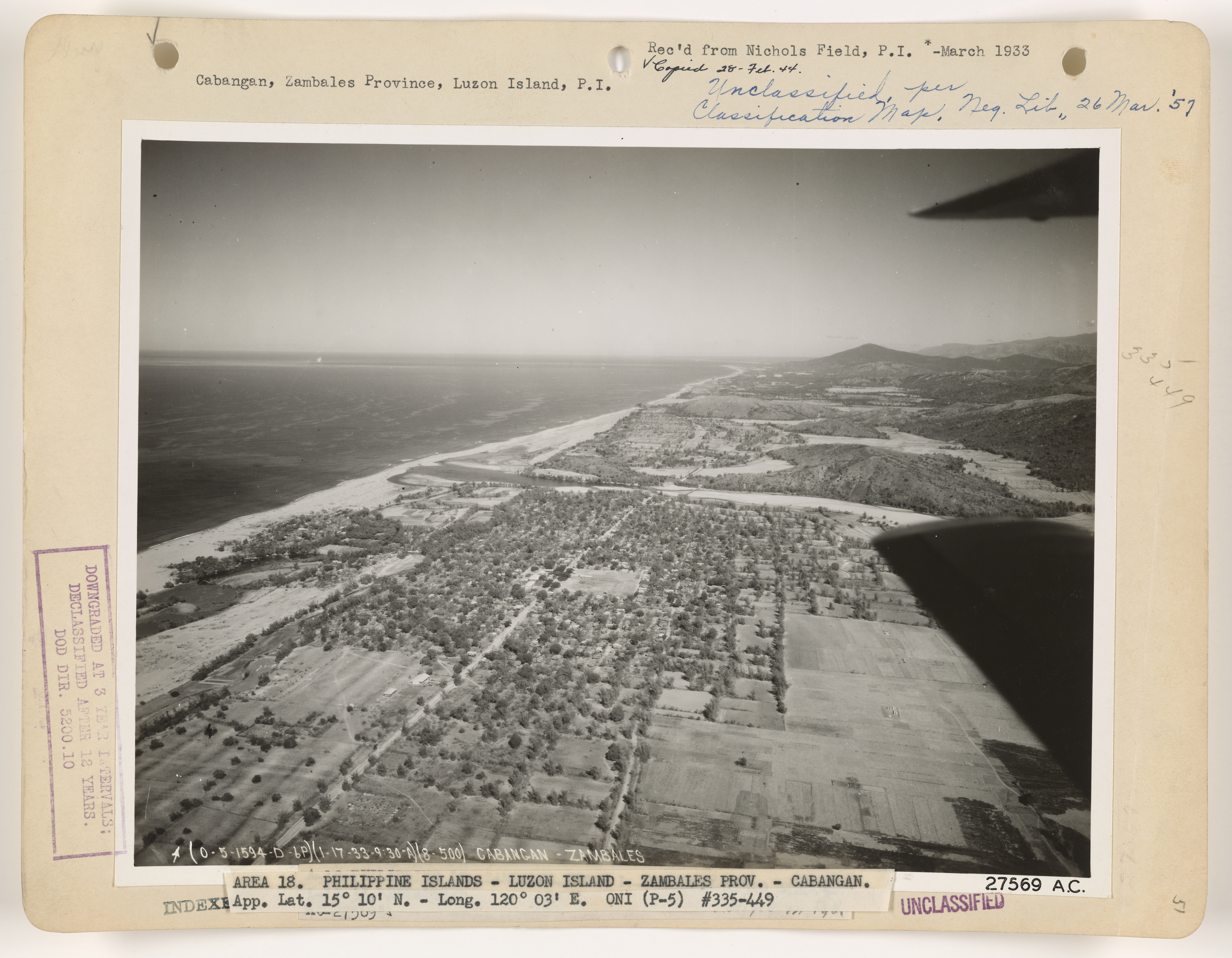
Aerial view of Cabangan, 1933

Cabangan is a coastal town that was originally located in Barrio San Isidro. Its strategic location near the South China Sea was very compelling that a group of few families whose principal source of livelihood was fishing decided to settle in that area.

There was a time when this town was frequently visited by Moro pirates who were notoriously known for their skill in using spears. They came by means of their swift vintas and murdered some of the inhabitants and looted their properties. Because of this the early settlers decided to go further from the sea and left San Isidro.

On their journey of finding a new settlement area, they passed through a hill were many palm trees were growing. These trees were growing. These trees bear fruits in the shape of large pots, locally known as the banga. The luxuriant palm trees were abundant in the locality that they called the place Cabangaan. When the Americans came, they could hardly pronounce the word Cabangaan, instead they pronounced it Cabangan. Since then, the people who settled permanently in that area adopted the name Cabangan.

Cabangan was formally established in 1680. Justo Alinea (1898) was the first Capitan Municipal, which is equivalent to the position of the mayor. The first Presidente Municipal was Benito Rivera, from years 1901 to 1902. He was succeeded by Antero Mora (1903-1904). In October 15, 1903, Act No. 945 was enacted and became effective immediately. It reduced the 25 municipalities of Zambales to 15. The municipality of Botolan absorbed Cabangan. In 1905, during the term of Andres Dumaplin, Botolan and Cabangan were governed by the same Presidente. The usage of the term Presidente Municipal ended in 1906 and Raymundo Dacoroon was elected to succeed Dumaplin. Dacoroon's term ended in 1908. Cabangan was liberated from Botolan on January 1, 1908 by EO No. 51, s. 1907. After this, the people of Cabangan elected their officials in their town.

== Geography ==
The Municipality of Cabangan lies on the western part of the Province of Zambales. It has a total land area of 23,940 hectares and approximately lies within 15°06' and 15°16' north latitude and 120°01' and 120°12' east longitude. The Municipality of Botolan bounds it on the north, on the east by the Zambales Mountain Ranges, the Municipality of San Felipe on the south, and on the west by the South China Sea.

Cabangan is 24 kilometres (15 mi) from Iba, 54 kilometres (34 mi) from Olongapo, and 180 kilometres (110 mi) from Manila, which is equivalent to 3½-hour ride.

The municipality has a varied topography characterized by high mountains to narrow coastal plains. The most outstanding feature observable in the municipality is the Zambales Range.

It is accessible via the provinces of Bulacan, Pampanga, and Bataan along the major highway network, via the Olongapo–Bugallon Road. It is also accessible via the province of Pangasinan. Road conditions are good along the coastline; however, going inland along the mountainside, roads are narrow, unpaved, and badly maintained.

=== Barangays ===
Cabangan is politically subdivided into 22 barangays. These barangays are headed by elected officials: Barangay Captain, Barangay Council, whose members are called Barangay Councilors. All are elected every three years. Some barangay consists of puroks and some have sitios. The barangays of Cadmang-Reserva, Camiing, Mabanglit, and Santa Rita all have 5 puroks, while San Isidro has 7 puroks. Some of the Barangays that have sitios include Arew which has sitio Macampao; Cadmang-Reserva has sitios Reserva and Baculi; Dolores has sitio Tangos; Mabanglit has sitio Sapangbato; New San Juan has sitio Maporac; Santo Niño has sitio Fabrica. Barangays Banuanbayo, Del Carmen, Dolores, San Antonio, and San Juan were historically one Poblacion.

Barangay Camiing was historically called Zaragoza, and later San Francisco California. It was named after a tree that was abundant in the place called "Camiring".

- Anonang
- Apo-apo
- Arew
- Banuanbayo (Poblacion)
- Cadmang-Reserva
- Camiing
- Casabaan
- Del Carmen (Poblacion)
- Dolores (Poblacion)
- Felmida-Diaz
- Laoag
- Lomboy
- Longos
- Mabanglit
- New San Juan
- San Antonio (Poblacion)
- San Isidro
- San Juan (Poblacion)
- San Rafael
- Santa Rita
- Santo Niño
- Tondo

=== Climate ===
Climate data for Cabangan, Zambales
Month	Jan	Feb	Mar	Apr	May	Jun	Jul	Aug	Sep	Oct	Nov	Dec	Year
Mean daily maximum °C (°F)	31 (88)	32 (90)	33 (91)	34 (93)	32 (90)	31 (88)	29 (84)	29 (84)	29 (84)	30 (86)	31 (88)	31 (88)	31 (88)
Mean daily minimum °C (°F)	20 (68)	20 (68)	21 (70)	23 (73)	25 (77)	25 (77)	25 (77)	25 (77)	24 (75)	23 (73)	22 (72)	20 (68)	23 (73)
Average precipitation mm (inches)	16 (0.6)	18 (0.7)	28 (1.1)	51 (2.0)	200 (7.9)	253 (10.0)	301 (11.9)	293 (11.5)	246 (9.7)	171 (6.7)	70 (2.8)	28 (1.1)	1,675 (66)
Average rainy days	6.2	7.1	10.4	15.5	24.4	26.4	28.2	27.5	26.2	23.6	15.9	8.7	220.1
Source: Meteoblue

== Demographics ==
Population census of Cabangan
Year	Pop.	±% p.a.
1903	3,015	—
1918	3,492	+0.98%
1939	5,310	+2.02%
1948	5,519	+0.43%
1960	7,484	+2.57%
1970	10,113	+3.05%
1975	11,586	+2.76%
1980	11,636	+0.09%
1990	15,337	+2.80%
1995	17,231	+2.21%
2000	18,848	+1.94%
2007	21,519	+1.84%
2010	23,082	+2.58%
2015	25,163	+1.66%
2020	28,118	+2.36%
2024	29,334	+1.02%
Source: Philippine Statistics Authority

In the 2024 census, the population of Cabangan was 29,334 people, with a density of 170 inhabitants per square kilometre or 440 inhabitants per square mile.

== Economy ==
Poverty incidence of Cabangan (%)

Source: Philippine Statistics Authority

The economy of Cabangan can be described to be operating mainly on subsistence. It is further characterized to be primarily an agricultural economy, with twenty of its twenty two barangays predominantly agricultural communities.

The municipality's main source of income is fishing, followed closely by farming and self-employment as the secondary and tertiary source of livelihood. Trade activities are done usually within barangays, as well as outside or with adjacent barangays.

Agricultural activities in the municipality, composed primarily of rice farming, are done within the months of June to August. The other crops that are produced by the town's agricultural sector are corn, root crops, legumes, leafy vegetables, fruit vegetables, and various spices. Livestock marketing is composed of pigs – hog fattening, poultry farming of broiler and native chicken, as well as carabao and cattle farming. Cabangan micro-industry are characterized by basket weaving, production of bamboo products such as furniture, furniture from rattan, ashware, broom making, and nipa frond weaving for roof thatches and as local hats or salakot.

Commercial activities in the municipality are mainly those which aim only to support local economy. Existing commercial establishments are mainly located along the major roads of Cabangan. There is only one public market, located in Barangay Dolores and is about 500 meters away from the Municipal Hall. All other crop and catch sales are done either along the coasts, and there is only one bank – The Rural Bank of Cabangan, to support banking requirements of its locals.

The main drainage systems in Cabangan are the Tanguay, Yabel, Kileng, Anonang Rivers, all draining westward towards the Philippine Sea. The rivers are wide with heavy floodplain deposits. Numerous small tributaries around the area.

Vegetation reflects the underlying rock types especially in the Central and Northern portions of the range. Gabbro supports dense forest at low altitudes while periodite is generally barren. Lowlands are planted with rice, root crops, and other seasonal crops. The rolling and moderately sloping areas are covered with fruit bearing trees.

== Education ==
The Cabangan Schools District Office governs all educational institutions within the municipality. It oversees the management and operations of all private and public, from primary to secondary schools.

=== Primary and elementary schools ===
- Anonang Elementary School
- Apo-Apo Elementary School
- Arew Elementary School
- Cabangan Elementary School
- Cabangan Learning & Development Center
- Cadmang Elementary School
- Camiing Elementary School
- Casa-Tondo Elementary School
- Hope Ecumenical Learning Center
- Longos Integrated School
- Laoag Elementary School
- Reserva Elementary School
- San Isidro Integrated School
- San Juan Integrated School
- San Juan Elementary School (Annex)
- San Rafael Elementary School
- Sapangbato Elementary School
- Sta. Rita Elementary School
- Sto. Niño Elementary School

=== Secondary schools ===
- Cabangan National High School
- Immaculate Conception Academy
- Longos Integrated School
- San Isidro Integrated School
- San Juan Integrated School
