= 2016 Zambales local elections =

Philippine election

2016 Zambales gubernatorial election
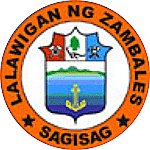
- May 9, 2016

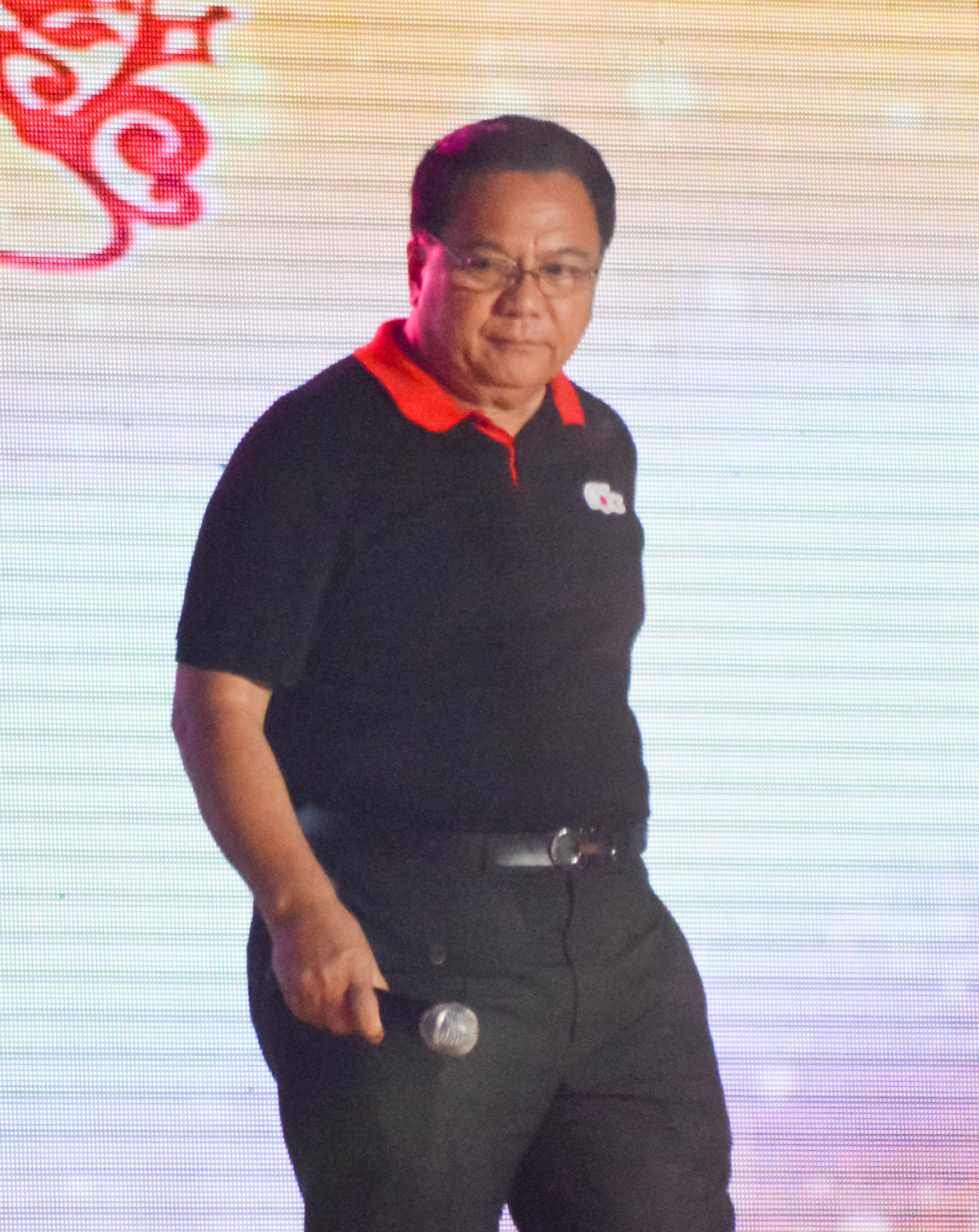
Nominee	Amor Deloso	Hermogenes Ebdane
Party	PGP	SZP
Running mate	Angel Magsaysay-Cheng	Ramon Lacbain II
Popular vote	146,257	112,123
Percentage	56.29%	43.16%
Governor before election
Hermogenes Ebdane
SZP
Elected Governor
Amor Deloso
PGP

The Zambales local elections was held on May 9, 2016 as part of the 2016 general election. Voters will select candidates for all local positions: a town mayor, vice mayor and town councilors, as well as members of the Sangguniang Panlalawigan, the vice-governor, governor and representatives for the two districts of Zambales.

== Dream Team ==
Two of the biggest political clan in Zambales have joined forces. the Deloso and Magsaysay family have joined forces this upcoming 2016 national and local elections to battle the incumbent Governor Hermogenes Ebdane's party, the Sulong Zambales Party.

According to Atty. Amor Deloso, former Governor of Zambales, his running mate will be Angel Magsaysay-Cheng, daughter of another former Governor Vicente Magsaysay (also known as GOVIC).

== From Liberal Party to Partido Galing at Puso ==
On April 28, gubernatorial candidate and former Liberal Party candidate Amor Deloso team formally supports Grace Poe's Partido Galing at Puso party. Present at the signing of manifestation held at Iba, Zambales were Brian Poe, son of Grace Poe, Deloso, 7 board member candidates, 10 mayoralty candidates, 10 vice mayoralty candidates and municipal council candidates under Deloso Team.

== Gubernatorial and Vice Gubernatorial Election ==
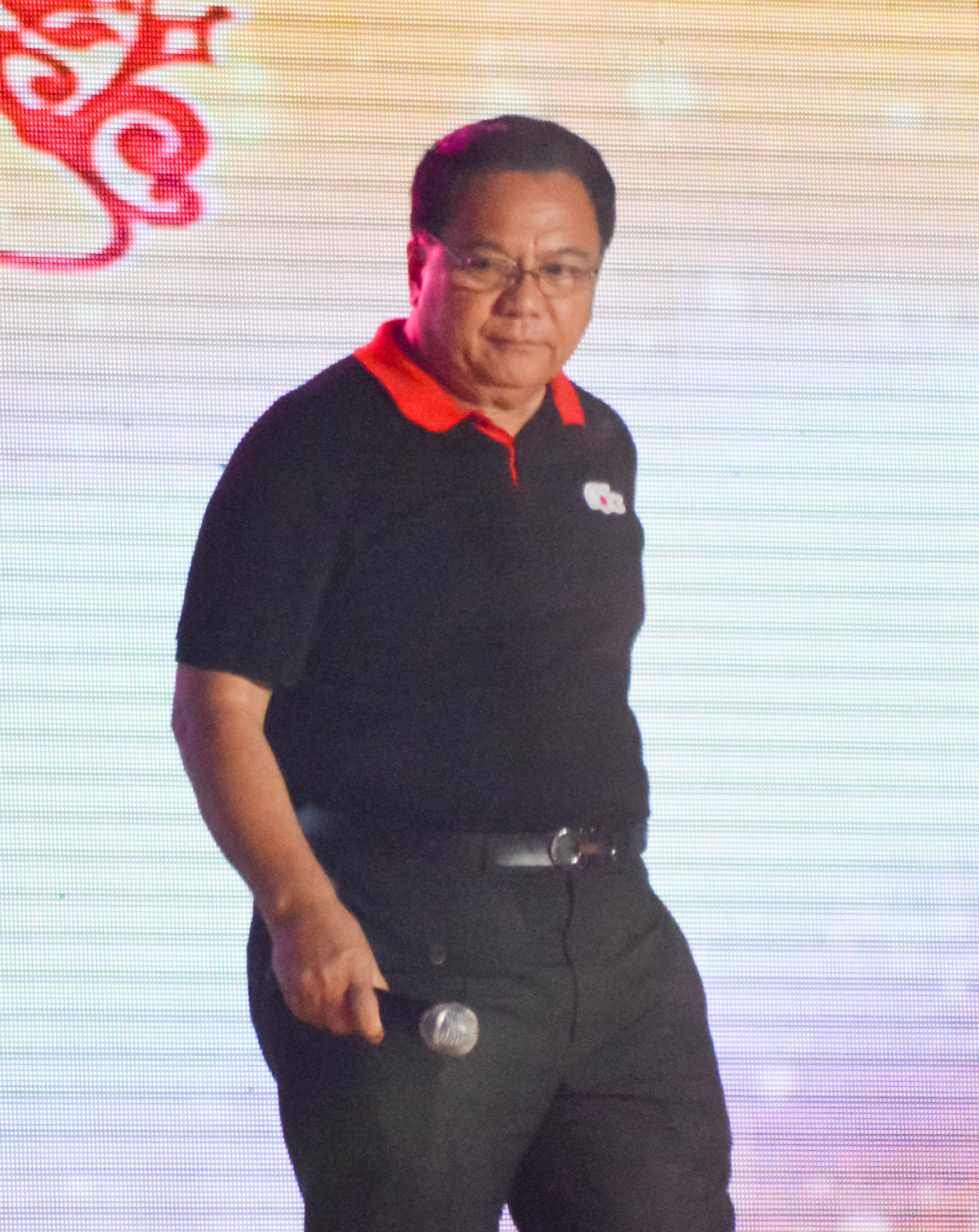
Incumbent Zambales Governor Hermogenes Ebdane during the presentation of Binibining Zambales 2015

Zambales Gubernatorial Election
Party	Candidate	Votes	%
PGP	Amor Deloso	146,257	56.29%
SZP	Hermogenes Ebdane	112,123	43.16%
Independent	Constantino Portuguis, Jr.	1,037	0.40%
Independent	Ruben Yadao	393	0.15%
Total votes		259,810	100%
PGP gain from SZP			

Zambales Vice Gubernatorial Election
Party	Candidate	Votes	%
Nacionalista	Angel Magsaysay-Cheng	132,717	55%
SZP	Ramon Lacbain II	108,598	45%
Total votes		241,315	100%
Nacionalista gain from SZP			

== Representatives ==
=== Representative, 1st District ===
2016 Philippine House of Representatives election in Zambales 1st District
Party	Candidate	Votes	%
Liberal	Jeffrey Khonghun	146,293	92.54%
PDP–Laban	Michael Macapagal	11,799	7.46%
Total votes		158,092	100%

=== Representative, 2nd District ===
2016 Philippine House of Representatives election in Zambales 2nd District
Party	Candidate	Votes	%
Liberal	Cheryl Deloso-Montalla	127,509	70.88%
SZP	Reinhard Jeresano	52,386	29.12%
Total votes		179,895	100%

== Board Members ==
Provincial Board Members (1st District)
Party	Candidate	Votes	%
SZP	Jon Khonghun	62,098	
SZP	John John Felarca	37,031	
SZP	Jose Gutierrez, Jr.	30,233	
Independent	Wilma Billman	25,312	
Independent	Allan Dela Paz	19,083	
Independent	Jason Lacbain	14,081	
Total votes		187,838	

Provincial Board Members (2nd District)
Party	Candidate	Votes	%
SZP	Jury Deloso	103,583	
SZP	Renato Collado	84,142	
SZP	Sam Ablola	74,804	
SZP	Sancho Abasta, Jr.	63,726	
SZP	Rolex Estella	60,989	
Liberal	Saturnino Bactad	59,877	
SZP	Noel Ferrer	57,589	
Liberal	Raedag Villamin, Jr.	54,513	
Liberal	Reynaldo Tarongoy	54,510	
Liberal	Jap Fallorin	51,357	
Independent	Alfred Mendoza	42,642	
SZP	Romelino Gojo	25,726	
Liberal	Eddie Misa	20,018	
Independent	Menandro Maybituin	19,778	
Independent	Maria Remedios Bueno	17,543	
Liberal	Eloisa Eclevia-Lat	13,727	
Liberal	William Mandilag	11,076	
Total votes		815,600	

== City and Municipality Elections ==
=== 1st District of Zambales ===
- City: Olongapo City
- Municipalities: Castillejos, Subic, San Marcelino

==== Olongapo City ====
Rolen Paulino is the incumbent.

Olongapo City Mayoralty Election
Party	Candidate	Votes	%
Liberal	Rolen Paulino	66,815	
Bagumbayan	James "Bong" Gordon Jr.	20,002	
Independent	Octavio Galvezo	549	
Total votes		87,366	

==== Castillejos ====
Jose Angelo Dominguez was the incumbent, his opponent was Vice Mayor Resty Viloria.

Castillejos Mayoralty Election
Party	Candidate	Votes	%
SZP	Jose Angelo Dominguez	12,966	
PGP	Resty Viloria	7,813	
Total votes		20,779	

==== San Marcelino ====
Jose Rodriguez is term limited, His son Von is his party's nominee. His opponent is Vice Mayor Elvis Soria.

San Marcelino Mayoralty Election
Party	Candidate	Votes	%
Independent	Elvis Soria	8,141	
SZP	Von Rodriguez	7,857	
Independent	Rowell Cruz	40	
Total votes		16,038	

==== Subic ====
Jay Khonghun is the incumbent.

Mayoralty Election
Party	Candidate	Votes	%
SZP	Jay Khonghun	36,649	
PDP–Laban	Rolando Ampunin	2,962	
Independent	Heber Bascon	816	
Total votes		40,427	

=== 2nd District of Zambales ===
- Municipalities: Botolan, Cabangan, Candelaria, Iba, Masinloc, Palauig, San Antonio, San Felipe, San Narciso, Santa Cruz

==== Botolan ====
Doris "Bing Maniquiz" Jeresano is the incumbent.

Botolan Mayoralty Election
Party	Candidate	Votes	%
SZP	Doris "Bing Maniquiz" Jeresano	19,012	
PGP	Rogelio "Roger" Yap	12,189	
Independent	Amado Reyes Jr.	232	
Total votes		31,433	

==== Cabangan ====
Ronaldo F. Apostol is term limited. His wife, Joy is the party's nominee.

Cabangan Mayoralty Election
Party	Candidate	Votes	%
SZP	Joy Apostol	4,319	
PGP	Willfredo Paul Pangan	3,554	
NPC	Jesse Mendigorin	2,815	
Independent	Leo Bringas	2,549	
Total votes		13,237	

==== Candelaria ====
Napoleon Edquid is the incumbent.

Candelaria Mayoralty Election
Party	Candidate	Votes	%
SZP	Napoleon Edquid	7,389	
PGP	Gilbert Hermoso	5,183	
Total votes		12,572	

==== Iba ====
Jun Rundstedt Ebdane is the incumbent.

Iba Mayoralty Election
Party	Candidate	Votes	%
SZP	Jun Rundstedt Ebdane	13,651	58.86%
Liberal	Ad Hebert Deloso	9,543	41.14%
Total votes		23,194	100.00%

==== Masinloc ====
Desiree S. Edora is term limited. Her husband, Jessu is the party's nominee.

Masinloc Mayoralty Election
Party	Candidate	Votes	%
PGP	Arsenia Lim	13,110	
SZP	Jessu Edora	11,947	
Total votes		25,057	

==== Palauig ====
Generoso F. Amog is term limited. His brother, Melchor is the party's nominee.

Palauig Mayoralty Election
Party	Candidate	Votes	%
Independent	Billy Aceron	6,586	
SZP	Melchor Amog	4,960	
Independent	Joel Amita	3,803	
PGP	Rosie Guatlo	1,679	
Independent	Sergio Altares	329	
Total votes		17,357	

==== San Antonio ====
Estela Deloso-Antipolo is the incumbent.

San Antonio Mayoralty Election
Party	Candidate	Votes	%
SZP	Estela Deloso-Antipolo	9,175	
PGP	Juan Alvez	5,606	
Independent	Cesmundo Gonzales	1,313	
Total votes		16,094	

==== San Felipe ====
Carolyn S. Fariñas is the incumbent.

San Felipe Mayoralty Election
Party	Candidate	Votes	%
SZP	Carolyn Fariñas	6,467	
PGP	Francisco Rosete, Jr.	4,255	
Total votes		10,722	

==== San Narciso ====
Peter Lim is the incumbent.

San Narciso Mayoralty Election
Party	Candidate	Votes	%
NPC	La Rainne Abad-Sarmiento	5,400	
Independent	Joel Manangan	4,437	
SZP	Peter Lim	3,693	
PGP	Adonis Ramos	653	
Independent	Ed Navarro	435	
Total votes		14,618	

==== Santa Cruz ====
Conny Marty is term limited. Her husband, Chito is the party's nominee.

Santa Cruz Mayoralty Election
Party	Candidate	Votes	%
SZP	Chito Marty	12,582	
Liberal	Angel Mastre, Jr.	12,047	
Independent	Ma. Veronica Matibag	1,580	
Independent	Carlos Lopez	435	
Total votes		26,664	
