= 2013 Zambales local elections =

2013 Zambales gubernatorial election
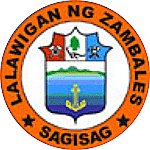
- May 13, 2013
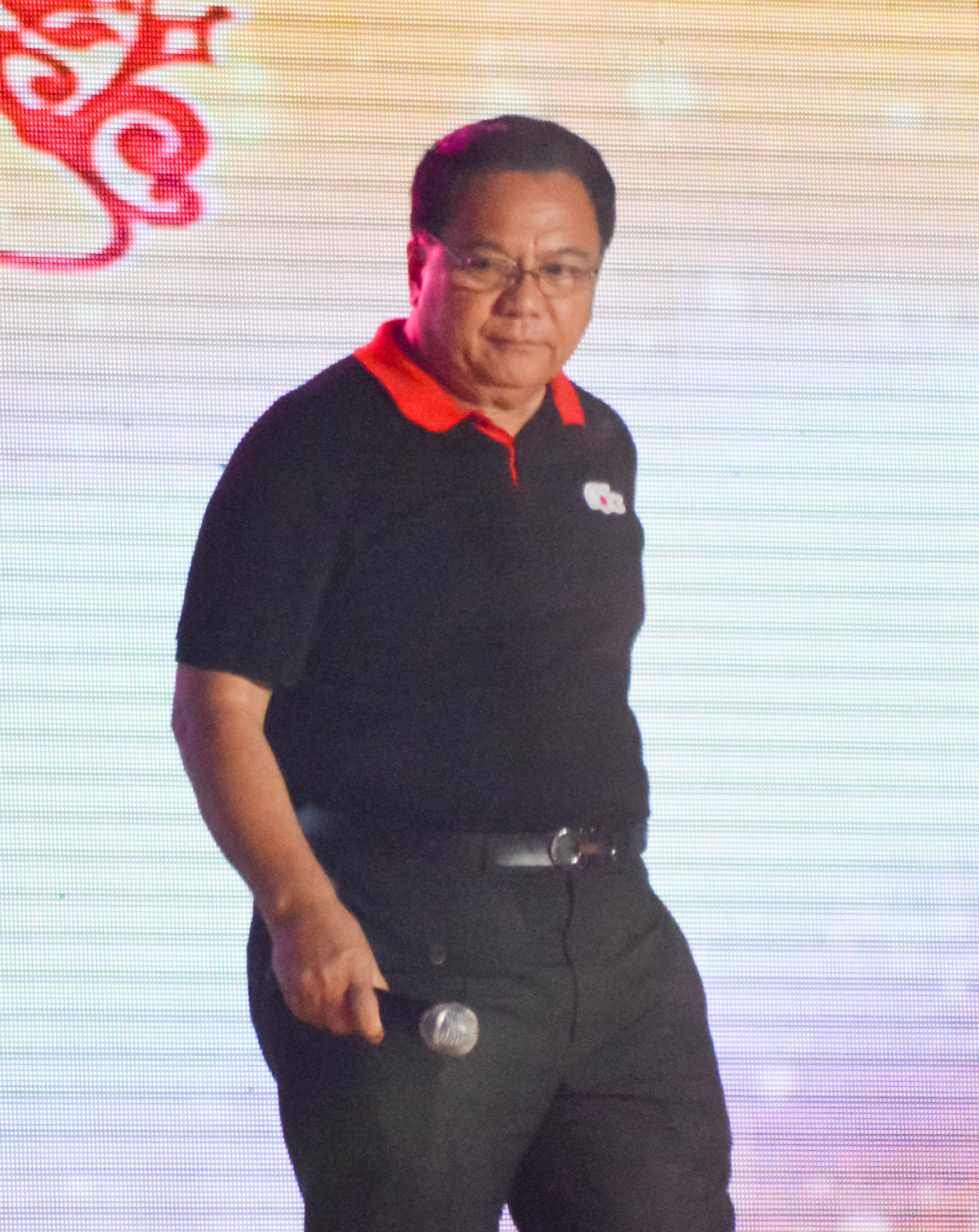

Nominee	Jun Ebdane	Amor Deloso
Party	SZP	Liberal
Running mate	Ramon Lacbain Jr.	Rica Diaz-Arambulo
Popular vote	129,828	107,173
Percentage	54.80	45.21
Governor before election
Jun Ebdane
SZP
Elected Governor
Jun Ebdane
SZP

Local elections were held in Zambales on May 13, 2013, as part of the 2013 general election. Voters selected candidates for all local positions: a town mayor, vice mayor and town councilors, as well as members of the Sangguniang Panlalawigan, the vice-governor, governor and representatives for the Two districts of Zambales.

== Provincial elections ==
The candidates for governor and vice governor with the highest number of votes wins the seat; they are voted separately, therefore, they may be of different parties when elected.

The Incumbent Governor Hermogenes "Jun" Ebdane is seeking for his reelection under the local party Sulong Zambales Party, His running mate is Incumbent Vice Gov. Ramon Lacbain. Gov. Ebdane is facing off former Gov. Amor Deloso of Liberal. In 2010, Ebdane won against to Deloso by a margin of 29,000. Deloso running mate is the daughter of Late Antonio M. Diaz, Rica Diaz Arambulo.

=== Gubernatorial election ===
Parties are as stated in their certificate of candidacies.

Zambales gubernatorial election
Party	Candidate	Votes	%
SZP	Hermogenes Ebdane (incumbent)	129,828	54.80
Liberal	Amor Deloso	107,173	45.21
Total votes		237,001	100.00

=== Vice-gubernatorial election ===
Zambales vice gubernatorial election
Party	Candidate	Votes	%
SZP	Ramon Lacbain, II	97,860	56.88
Liberal	Rica Diaz-Arambulo	65,577	38.12
Independent	Reynaldo Tarongoy	8,604	5.00
Total votes		172,041	100.00

== Congressional elections ==
Each of Zambales Two legislative districts will elect each representative to the House of Representatives. The candidate with the highest number of votes wins the seat.

=== 1st District ===
Incumbent Mitos Magsaysay is term limited; she is running for the Senate; her son, Jesus Vicente II, known as Jobo, is her party's nominee. Jesus Vicente is facing off three termer Olongapo City Mayor James Gordon Jr. and former Subic Mayor Jeffrey Khonghun.

2013 Philippine House of Representatives election at Zambales' 1st district
Party	Candidate	Votes	%	±%
NPC	Jeffrey Khonghun	45,434	57.74%	
Liberal	James Gordon Jr.	22,068	28.04%	
UNA	Jesus Vicente "Jobo" Magsaysay II	11,189	14.22%	
Margin of victory		23,366	29.70%	
Rejected ballots				
Turnout				

=== 2nd District ===
Incumbent Jun Omar Ebdane succeeded Antonio M. Diaz in a special election when the latter died in 2011.

2013 Philippine House of Representatives election at Zambales' 2nd district
Party	Candidate	Votes	%	±%
Liberal	Cheryl Deloso-Montalla	73,476	55.18%	
SZP	Jun Omar Ebdane	59,669	44.82%	
Margin of victory				
Rejected ballots				
Turnout				
Liberal gain from SZP		Swing	{{{swing}}}	

== Provincial Board elections ==
All 2 Districts of Zambales will elect Sangguniang Panlalawigan or provincial board members.

=== 1st District ===
Zambales 1st District Sangguniang Panlalawigan election
Party	Candidate	Votes	%
SZP	Jonathan Khonghun	44,303	
SZP	Jose Benedicto Felarca	32,093	
SZP	Jose Gutierrez	27,746	
Liberal	Baby Dellana	13,547	
Independent	Rizalino Pablo Jr.	5,647	
Independent	Duane Febre	2,158	
Total votes			

=== 2nd District ===
Zambales 2nd District Sangguniang Panlalawigan election
Party	Candidate	Votes	%
Independent	Jury Deloso	53,429	9.32
SZP	Renato Collado	49,998	8.73
UNA	Jun Pangan	45,458	7.93
SZP	Samuel Ablola	44,700	7.80
Independent	Al Mendoza	40,926	7.14
SZP	Sancho Abasta Jr.	38,261	6.68
Liberal	Conrado Fallorin	37,948	6.62
Liberal	Saturnino Bactad	33,998	5.93
Liberal	Mor Lim	33,468	5.84
SZP	Porfirio Elamparo	32,268	5.63
SZP	Jesse Mendegorin	32,214	5.62
SZP	Jean Morana	30,515	5.33
Independent	Eric Ebarle	25,246	4.41
Liberal	Fideliza Nacin	17,731	3.09
SZP	Roberto Blanco	17,591	3.07
Liberal	Baby Bueno	15,447	2.70
Independent	Ramon Aquino, Sr.	12,669	2.21
Independent	Boy Misa	11,155	1.95
Total votes			

== City and municipal elections ==
All cities and municipalities of Zambales will elect mayor and vice-mayor this election. The candidates for mayor and vice mayor with the highest number of votes wins the seat; they are voted separately, therefore, they may be of different parties when elected. Below is the list of mayoralty candidates of each city and municipalities per district.

=== 1st District ===
- City: Olongapo City^{1}
- Municipalities: Castillejos, San Marcelino, Subic

==== Olongapo City ====
Incumbent Mayor James Gordon Jr. is term-limited; his wife former Vice Gov. Anne Gordon is his party's nominee. Anne opponents are vice mayor Rolen Paulino and Coun. Bugsy Delos Reyes

Olongapo City mayoralty election
Party	Candidate	Votes	%
NPC	Rolen Paulineo	40,664	32.27
Bagumbayan	Anne Gordon	27,648	25.34
Independent	Bugsy Delos Reyes	10,093	9.25
Total votes		109,093	100.00
NPC gain from Bagumbayan			

==== Castillejos ====
Jose Angelo Dominguez is the incumbent. His opponent is former Mayor Wilma Billman. In the 2010 election Dominguez won against Billman with a margin of 489 votes.

Castillejos mayoralty election
Party	Candidate	Votes	%
PMP	Jose Angelo Dominguez	10,304	57.85
SZP	Wilma Billman	7,507	42.15
Total votes		18,430	100.00

==== San Marcelino ====
Incumbent Mayor Jose Rodriguez is running unopposed.

San Marcelino mayoralty election
Party	Candidate	Votes	%
SZP	Jose Rodriguez	10,838	100.00
Total votes		13,783	100.00

==== Subic ====
Jay Khonghun is the incumbent. his opponent is coun. Ruben Gaduang.

Subic mayoralty election
Party	Candidate	Votes	%
SZP	Jay Khonghun	23,871	92.13
Liberal	Ruben Gaduang	2,040	7.87
Total votes		27,752	100.00

=== 2nd District ===
- Municipalities: Botolan, Cabangan, Candelaria, Iba, Masinloc, Palauig, San Antonio, San Felipe, San Narciso, Santa Cruz

==== Botolan ====
Incumbent mayor Nerma Yap is running for vice mayor, her husband former mayor Rogelio Yap is her party's nominee.

Botolan mayoralty election
Party	Candidate	Votes	%
SZP	Bing Maniquiz	15,696	55.01
Liberal	Rogelio Yap	12,331	43.22
Independent	Cesar Torres	504	1.77
Total votes		29,425	100.00

==== Cabangan ====
Ronaldo Apostol is the incumbent.

Cabangan mayoralty election
Party	Candidate	Votes	%
SZP	Ronaldo Apostol	7,884	68.24
Liberal	Oyo Pangan	3,670	31.76
Total votes		11,867	100.00

==== Candelaria ====
Incumbent mayor Jean Moraña is term-limited and running for Board Member instead, Businessman Napoleon Edquid is her party's nominee.

Candelaria mayoralty election
Party	Candidate	Votes	%
SZP	Napoleon Edquid	3,916	34.77
Independent	Gilbert Hermoso	2,918	25.91
Liberal	George Ebuengan	2,207	19.60
Independent	Henry Edquid	2,141	19.01
Independent	Novina Dangeo	81	0.72
Total votes		11,715	100.00

==== Iba ====
Ad Hebert Deloso is the incumbent. his opponents is the son of Governor Jun Ebdane Provincial Administrator Rundy Ebdane.

Iba mayoralty election
Party	Candidate	Votes	%
SZP	Rundy Ebdane	9,422	52.94
Liberal	Ad Hebert Deloso	7,573	42.55
Independent	Lydia Mayormita	524	2.94
Independent	Victor De Guzman	280	1.57
Total votes		18,878	100.00

==== Masinloc ====
Desiree Edora is the incumbent.

Masinloc mayoralty election
Party	Candidate	Votes	%
SZP	Desiree Edora	7,792	55.16
Independent	Senyang Lim	6,285	44.49
Independent	Glenn Elayda	50	0.35
Total votes		14,633	100.00

==== Palauig ====
Generoso Amog is the incumbent. his opponent is former Mayor and Incumbent Board Member Rosie Guatlo.

Palauig mayoralty election
Party	Candidate	Votes	%
SZP	Generoso Amog	7,368	53.94
Liberal	Rosie Guatlo	6,129	44.87
Independent	Ernesto Apuyan	163	1.19
Total votes		14,355	100.00

==== San Antonio ====
Estela Antipolo is the incumbent after Supreme Court proclaim her as mayor. In the 2010 election former Mayor Romeo Lonzanida won against Antipolo by margin of 268 votes, but Mayor Lonzanida was disqualified by the Comelec and Antipolo is only qualified candidate who garnered the highest number of votes and should be proclaimed mayor. Antipolo's opponents is incumbent Vice Mayor Efren Aratea and Leo Lonzanida.

San Antonio mayoralty election
Party	Candidate	Votes	%
Liberal	Estela Deloso-Antipolo	4,477	33.72
SZP	Leo Lonzanida	3,700	27.87
UNA	Efren Aratea	2,566	19.33
Independent	Don Juan Alvez	2,535	19.09
Total votes		13,644	100.00

==== San Felipe ====
Carolyn Fariñas is the incumbent.

San Felipe mayoralty election
Party	Candidate	Votes	%
SZP	Carolyn Fariñas	3,795	46.57
Lakas	Edgar Dela Cruz	2,659	32.63
Liberal	Bulan Rosete	1,686	20.69
Independent	Alex Fajotina	9	0.11
Total votes		8,417	100.00

==== San Narciso ====
Peter Lim is the incumbent. his opponents is coun. Sebastian Arichea and former Vice Mayor Joel Manangan.

San Narciso mayoralty election
Party	Candidate	Votes	%
SZP	Peter Lim	5,073	41.35
Independent	Joel Manangan	4,710	38.39
Liberal	Sebastian Arichea	2,357	19.21
Independent	Sonny Almazan	129	1.05
Total votes		12,705	100.00

==== Santa Cruz ====
Incumbent Luisito Marty is term limited, Civic leader Connie Marty is his party's nominee.

santa Cruz mayoralty election
Party	Candidate	Votes	%
SZP	Connie Marty	3,171	54.34
Liberal	Angel Maestre Jr.	2,665	45.66
Total votes		6,269	100.00
