= 2025 Philippine House of Representatives elections in Central Luzon =

- May 12, 2025
- All 24 Central Luzon seats in the House of Representatives
Party	Seats	+/–
Lakas	11	+9
PFP	5	New
NUP	4	−2
NPC	2	−1
Nacionalista	1	−2
LDP	1	0
This lists parties that won seats. See the complete results below.

The 2025 Philippine House of Representatives elections in Central Luzon were held on May 12, 2025, as part of the 2025 Philippine general election.

== Summary ==
Congressional district	Incumbent	Incumbent's party	Winner	Winner's party	Winning margin
Aurora	Rommel T. Angara	LDP	Rommel T. Angara	LDP	Unopposed
Bataan–1st	Geraldine Roman	Lakas	Antonino Roman III	Lakas	Unopposed
Bataan–2nd	Albert Garcia	NUP	Albert Garcia	NUP	Unopposed
Bataan–3rd	Maria Angela Garcia	NUP	Maria Angela Garcia	NUP	75.02%
Bulacan–1st	Danny Domingo	NUP	Danny Domingo	NUP	62.14%
Bulacan–2nd	Tina Pancho	NUP	Tina Pancho	NUP	88.50%
Bulacan–3rd	Lorna Silverio	NUP	Cholo Violago	Lakas	21.47%
Bulacan–4th	Linabelle Villarica	PFP	Linabelle Villarica	PFP	51.08%
Bulacan–5th	Ambrosio Cruz	Lakas	Agay Cruz	Lakas	70.22%
Bulacan–6th	Salvador Pleyto	Lakas	Salvador Pleyto	Lakas	Unopposed
Nueva Ecija–1st	Mika Suansing	Lakas	Mika Suansing	Lakas	69.07%
Nueva Ecija–2nd	Joseph Gilbert Violago	NUP	Kokoy Salvador	PFP	0.29%
Nueva Ecija–3rd	Rosanna Vergara	PFP	Jay Vergara	PFP	2.84%
Nueva Ecija–4th	Emeng Pascual	Lakas	Emeng Pascual	Lakas	14.64%
Pampanga–1st	Carmelo Lazatin II	Lakas	Carmelo Lazatin Jr.	PFP	Unopposed
Pampanga–2nd	Gloria Macapagal Arroyo	Lakas	Gloria Macapagal Arroyo	Lakas	Unopposed
Pampanga–3rd	Aurelio Gonzales Jr.	Lakas	Mica Gonzales	Lakas	12.55%
Pampanga–4th	Anna York Bondoc	Nacionalista	Anna York Bondoc	Nacionalista	31.33%
San Jose del Monte	Florida Robes	PFP	Arthur Robes	Lakas	48.74%
Tarlac–1st	Jaime Cojuangco	NPC	Jaime Cojuangco	NPC	Unopposed
Tarlac–2nd	Christian Yap	Sama Sama Tarlac	Cristy Angeles	PFP	7.66%
Tarlac–3rd	Bong Rivera	NPC	Bong Rivera	NPC	73.45%
Zambales–1st	Jay Khonghun	Lakas	Jay Khonghun	Lakas	Unopposed
Zambales–2nd	Bing Maniquiz	Lakas	Bing Maniquiz	Lakas	36.82%

== Aurora ==
2025 Aurora's at-large congressional district election
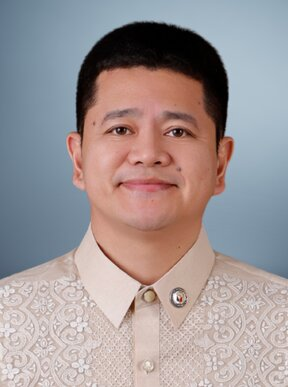
Candidate	Rommel T. Angara
Party	LDP
Popular vote	102,615
Percentage	100.00%
House representative before election
Rommel T. Angara
LDP
Elected House representative
Rommel T. Angara
LDP

Incumbent Rommel T. Angara of Laban ng Demokratikong Pilipino won re-election for a third term unopposed.

Candidate	Party	Votes	%
Rommel T. Angara (incumbent)	Laban ng Demokratikong Pilipino	102,615	100.00
Total		102,615	100.00
Valid votes		102,615	79.55
Invalid/blank votes		26,378	20.45
Total votes		128,993	100.00
Registered voters/turnout		157,240	82.04
LDP hold			
Source: Commission on Elections

== Bataan ==
=== 1st district ===
2025 Bataan's 1st congressional district election
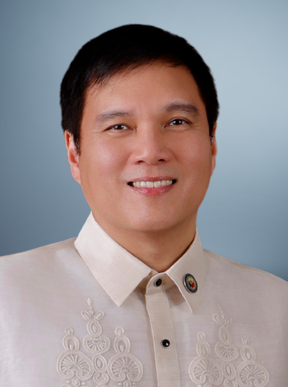
Candidate	Antonino Roman III
Party	Lakas
Popular vote	114,677
Percentage	100.00%
House representative before election
Geraldine Roman
Lakas
Elected House representative
Antonino Roman III
Lakas

Incumbent Geraldine Roman of Lakas–CMD was term-limited.

Lakas–CMD nominated Roman's brother, provincial board member Antonino Roman III, who won the election unopposed.

Candidate	Party	Votes	%
Antonino Roman III	Lakas–CMD	114,677	100.00
Total		114,677	100.00
Valid votes		114,677	84.07
Invalid/blank votes		21,733	15.93
Total votes		136,410	100.00
Registered voters/turnout		163,095	83.64
Lakas hold			
Source: Commission on Elections

=== 2nd district ===
2025 Bataan's 2nd congressional district election
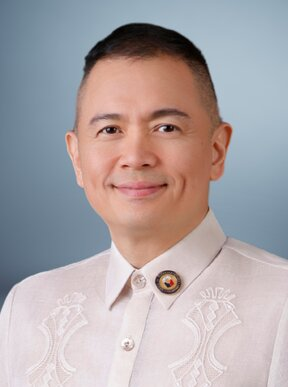
Candidate	Albert Garcia
Party	NUP
Popular vote	149,614
Percentage	100.00%
House representative before election
Albert Garcia
NUP
Elected House representative
Albert Garcia
NUP

Incumbent Albert Garcia of the National Unity Party won re-election for a second term unopposed.

Candidate	Party	Votes	%
Albert Garcia (incumbent)	National Unity Party	149,614	100.00
Total		149,614	100.00
Valid votes		149,614	86.39
Invalid/blank votes		23,562	13.61
Total votes		173,176	100.00
Registered voters/turnout		199,306	86.89
NUP hold			
Source: Commission on Elections

=== 3rd district ===
2025 Bataan's 3rd congressional district election
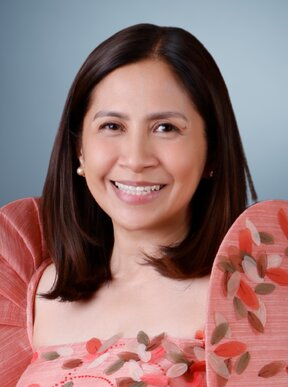
		IND
Candidate	Maria Angela Garcia	Ernesto Manalo
Party	NUP	Independent
Popular vote	144,517	20,627
Percentage	100.00%	12.49%
House representative before election
Maria Angela Garcia
NUP
Elected House representative
Maria Angela Garcia
NUP

Incumbent Maria Angela Garcia of the National Unity Party ran for a second term.

Garcia won re-election against Ernesto Manalo (Independent).

Candidate	Party	Votes	%
Maria Angela Garcia (incumbent)	National Unity Party	144,517	87.51
Ernesto Manalo	Independent	20,627	12.49
Total		165,144	100.00
Valid votes		165,144	88.87
Invalid/blank votes		20,683	11.13
Total votes		185,827	100.00
Registered voters/turnout		223,643	83.09
NUP hold			
Source: Commission on Elections

== Bulacan ==
=== 1st district ===
Bulacan's 1st congressional district election
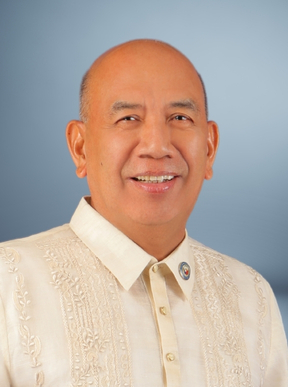
		AKSYON
Candidate	Danny Domingo	Allan Andan
Party	NUP	Aksyon
Popular vote	283,905	64,753
Percentage	80.50%	18.36%
House representative before election
Danny Domingo
NUP
Elected House representative
Danny Domingo
NUP

Incumbent Danny Domingo of the National Unity Party ran for a second term.

Domingo won re-election against provincial board member Allan Andan (Aksyon Demokratiko) and Joselito Pinlac (Independent).

Candidate	Party	Votes	%
Danny Domingo (incumbent)	National Unity Party	283,905	80.50
Allan Andan	Aksyon Demokratiko	64,753	18.36
Joselito Pinlac	Independent	4,035	1.14
Total		352,693	100.00
Valid votes		352,693	92.35
Invalid/blank votes		29,214	7.65
Total votes		381,907	100.00
Registered voters/turnout		449,028	85.05
NUP hold			
Source: Commission on Elections

=== 2nd district ===
2025 Bulacan's 2nd congressional district election
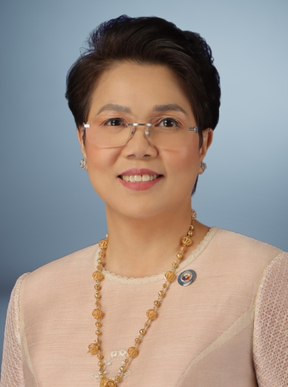
		IND
Candidate	Tina Pancho	Jimmy Villafuerte
Party	NUP	Independent
Popular vote	167,236	10,195
Percentage	94.25%	5.75%
House representative before election
Tina Pancho
NUP
Elected House representative
Tina Pancho
NUP

Incumbent Tina Pancho of the National Unity Party ran for a second term.

Pancho won re-election against Jimmy Villafuerte (Independent).

Candidate	Party	Votes	%
Tina Pancho (incumbent)	National Unity Party	167,236	94.25
Jimmy Villafuerte	Independent	10,195	5.75
Total		177,431	100.00
Valid votes		177,431	88.95
Invalid/blank votes		22,038	11.05
Total votes		199,469	100.00
Registered voters/turnout		236,272	84.42
NUP hold			
Source: Commission on Elections

=== 3rd district ===
2025 Bulacan's 3rd congressional district election
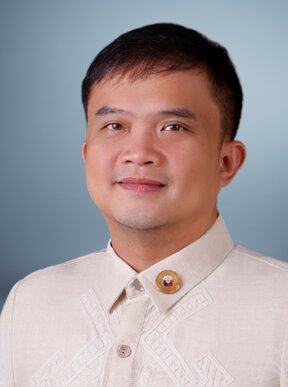
		NUP
Candidate	Cholo Violago	Vic Silverio
Party	Lakas	NUP
Popular vote	146,672	94,631
Percentage	60.51%	39.04%
House representative before election
Lorna Silverio
NUP
Elected House representative
Cholo Violago
Lakas

Incumbent Lorna Silverio of the National Unity Party (NUP) was term-limited.

The NUP nominated Silverio's son, Vic Silverio, who was defeated by San Rafael mayor Cholo Violago of Lakas–CMD. JG Agojo (Independent) also ran for representative.

Candidate	Party	Votes	%
Cholo Violago	Lakas–CMD	146,672	60.51
Vic Silverio	National Unity Party	94,631	39.04
JG Agojo	Independent	1,077	0.44
Total		242,380	100.00
Valid votes		242,380	95.47
Invalid/blank votes		11,489	4.53
Total votes		253,869	100.00
Registered voters/turnout		286,844	88.50
Lakas gain from NUP			
Source: Commission on Elections

=== 4th district ===
2025 Bulacan's 4th congressional district election
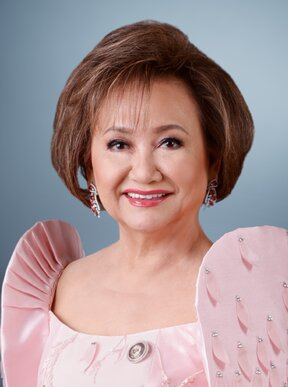
		NUP
Candidate	Linabelle Villarica	Andre Santos
Party	PFP	NUP
Popular vote	155,351	43,012
Percentage	70.64%	19.56%
House representative before election
Linabelle Villarica
PFP
Elected House representative
Linabelle Villarica
PFP

Incumbent Linabelle Villarica of the Partido Federal ng Pilipinas ran for a second term. She was previously affiliated with PDP–Laban.

Villarica won re-election against former Marilao vice mayor Andre Santos (National Unity Party) and four other candidates.

Candidate	Party	Votes	%
Linabelle Villarica (incumbent)	Partido Federal ng Pilipinas	155,351	70.64
Andre Santos	National Unity Party	43,012	19.56
Abe Bordador	Independent	14,611	6.64
Demy Bautista	Independent	4,113	1.87
Ferdie Victolero	Independent	1,441	0.66
Ernesto Padernos	Independent	1,389	0.63
Total		219,917	100.00
Valid votes		219,917	89.29
Invalid/blank votes		26,374	10.71
Total votes		246,291	100.00
Registered voters/turnout		287,554	85.65
PFP hold			
Source: Commission on Elections

=== 5th district ===
2025 Bulacan's 5th congressional district election
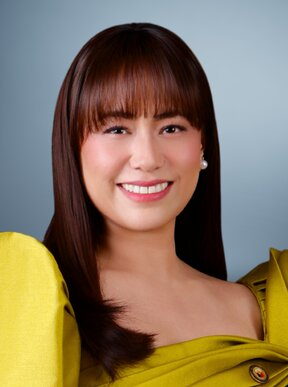
		IND
Candidate	Agay Cruz	Vic Fernando
Party	Lakas	Independent
Popular vote	188,973	33,051
Percentage	85.11%	14.89%
House representative before election
Ambrosio Cruz Jr.
Lakas
Elected House representative
Agay Cruz
Lakas

Incumbent Ambrosio Cruz Jr. of Lakas–CMD is running for Mayor of Guiguinto. He was previously affiliated with PDP–Laban.

Lakas–CMD nominated Cruz's daughter, Guiguinto mayor Agay Cruz, who won the election against Vic Fernando (Independent).

Candidate	Party	Votes	%
Agay Cruz	Lakas–CMD	188,973	85.11
Vic Fernando	Independent	33,051	14.89
Total		222,024	100.00
Valid votes		222,024	83.07
Invalid/blank votes		45,247	16.93
Total votes		267,271	100.00
Registered voters/turnout		317,655	84.14
Lakas hold			
Source: Commission on Elections

=== 6th district ===
2025 Bulacan's 6th congressional district election
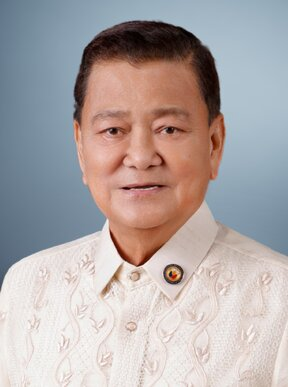
Candidate	Salvador Pleyto
Party	Lakas
Popular vote	164,503
Percentage	100.00%
House representative before election
Salvador Pleyto
Lakas
Elected House representative
Salvador Pleyto
Lakas

Incumbent Salvador Pleyto of Lakas–CMD won re-election for a second term unopposed. He was previously affiliated with PDP–Laban.

Candidate	Party	Votes	%
Salvador Pleyto (incumbent)	Lakas–CMD	164,503	100.00
Total		164,503	100.00
Valid votes		164,503	67.71
Invalid/blank votes		78,451	32.29
Total votes		242,954	100.00
Registered voters/turnout		285,359	85.14
Lakas hold			
Source: Commission on Elections

=== San Jose del Monte ===
2025 San Jose del Monte's lone congressional district election
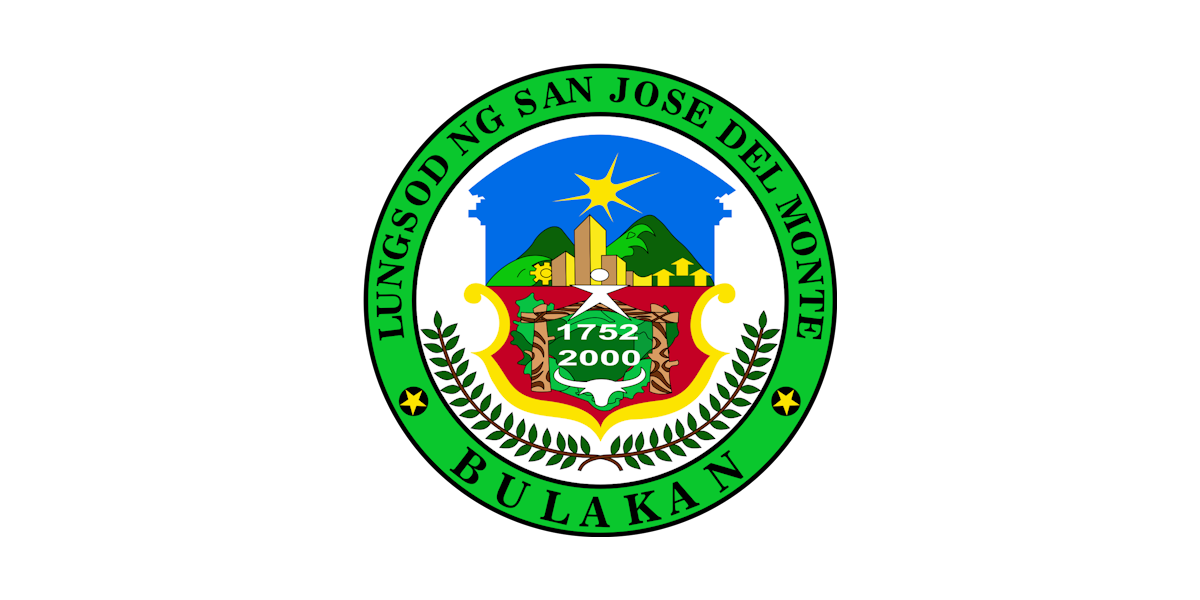

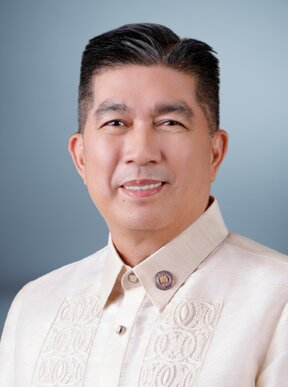
		LP
Candidate	Arthur Robes	Dan Florentino
Party	Lakas	Liberal
Popular vote	170,741	58,845
Percentage	74.37%	25.63%
House representative before election
Florida Robes
PFP
Elected House representative
Arthur Robes
Lakas

Term-limited incumbent Florida Robes (Partido Federal ng Pilipinas) is running for mayor of San Jose del Monte. She was re-elected in 2022 under PDP–Laban with 64.21% of the vote.

Robes endorsed her husband, San Jose del Monte mayor Arthur Robes (Lakas–CMD), who won the election against Dan Florentino (Liberal Party).

Candidate	Party	Votes	%
Arthur Robes	Lakas–CMD	170,741	74.37
Dan Florentino	Liberal Party	58,845	25.63
Total		229,586	100.00
Valid votes		229,586	89.66
Invalid/blank votes		26,469	10.34
Total votes		256,055	100.00
Registered voters/turnout		310,314	82.51
Lakas gain from PFP			
Source: Commission on Elections

== Nueva Ecija ==
=== 1st district ===
2025 Nueva Ecija's 1st congressional district election
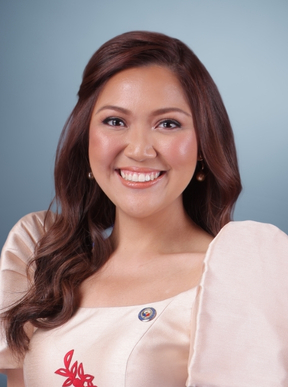
		IND
Candidate	Mika Suansing	Argel Joseph Cabatbat
Party	Lakas	Independent
Popular vote	234,820	40,857
Percentage	83.62%	14.55%
House representative before election
Mika Suansing
Lakas
Elected House representative
Mika Suansing
Lakas

Incumbent Mika Suansing of Lakas–CMD ran for a second term. She was previously affiliated with the Nacionalista Party.

Suansing won re-election against former Magsasaka party-list representative Argel Joseph Cabatbat (Independent) and Virgilio Baldovino Jr. (Independent).

Candidate	Party	Votes	%
Mika Suansing (incumbent)	Lakas–CMD	234,820	83.62
Argel Joseph Cabatbat	Independent	40,857	14.55
Virgilio Baldovino Jr.	Independent	5,141	1.83
Total		280,818	100.00
Valid votes		280,818	86.26
Invalid/blank votes		44,712	13.74
Total votes		325,530	100.00
Registered voters/turnout		400,221	81.34
Lakas hold			
Source: Commission on Elections

=== 2nd district ===
2025 Nueva Ecija's 2nd congressional district election
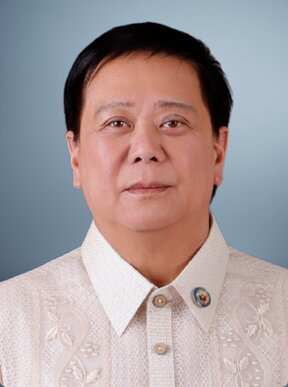
		LAKAS
Candidate	Kokoy Salvador	Micaela Violago
Party	PFP	Lakas
Popular vote	130,421	129,657
Percentage	49.77%	49.48%
House representative before election
Joseph Gilbert Violago
NUP
Elected House representative
Kokoy Salvador
PFP

Incumbent Joseph Gilbert Violago of the National Unity Party retired.

Violago endorsed his wife, former representative Micaela Violago of Lakas–CMD, who was defeated by his brother San Jose mayor Kokoy Salvador (Partido Federal ng Pilipinas). Danilo Malanda (Independent) also ran for representative.

Candidate	Party	Votes	%
Kokoy Salvador	Partido Federal ng Pilipinas	130,421	49.77
Micaela Violago	Lakas–CMD	129,657	49.48
Danilo Malanda	Independent	1,951	0.74
Total		262,029	100.00
Valid votes		262,029	94.74
Invalid/blank votes		14,556	5.26
Total votes		276,585	100.00
Registered voters/turnout		329,147	84.03
PFP gain from NUP			
Source: Commission on Elections

=== 3rd district ===
2025 Nueva Ecija's 3rd congressional district election
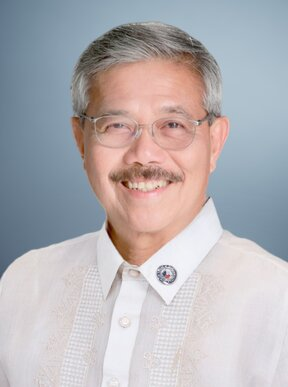

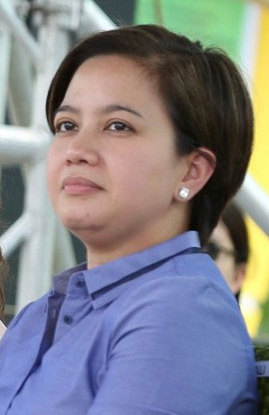
Candidate	Jay Vergara	Czarina Umali
Party	PFP	Sigaw
Popular vote	194,650	183,912
Percentage	51.42%	48.58%
House representative before election
Rosanna Vergara
PFP
Elected House representative
Jay Vergara
PFP

Incumbent Rosanna Vergara of the Partido Federal ng Pilipinas (PFP) was term-limited. She was previously affiliated with PDP–Laban.

The PFP nominated Vergara's husband, Cabanatuan mayor Jay Vergara, who won the election against former representative Czarina Umali (Unang Sigaw).

Candidate	Party	Votes	%
Jay Vergara	Partido Federal ng Pilipinas	194,650	51.42
Czarina Umali	Unang Sigaw	183,912	48.58
Total		378,562	100.00
Valid votes		378,562	97.35
Invalid/blank votes		10,313	2.65
Total votes		388,875	100.00
Registered voters/turnout		466,379	83.38
PFP hold			
Source: Commission on Elections

=== 4th district ===
2025 Nueva Ecija's 4th congressional district election
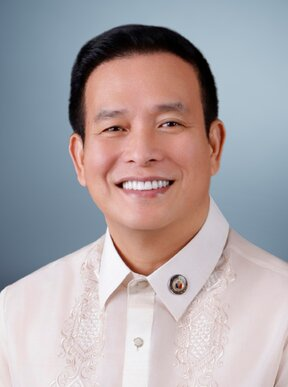
		PRP
Candidate	Emeng Pascual	Maricel Natividad Nagaño
Party	Lakas	PRP
Popular vote	197,350	146,964
Percentage	57.32%	42.68%
House representative before election
Emeng Pascual
Lakas
Elected House representative
Emeng Pascual
Lakas

Incumbent Emeng Pascual of Lakas–CMD) ran for a second term. He was previously affiliated with PDP–Laban.

Pascual won re-election against former representative Maricel Natividad Nagaño (People's Reform Party).

Candidate	Party	Votes	%
Emeng Pascual (incumbent)	Lakas–CMD	197,350	57.32
Maricel Natividad Nagaño	People's Reform Party	146,964	42.68
Total		344,314	100.00
Valid votes		344,314	95.92
Invalid/blank votes		14,646	4.08
Total votes		358,960	100.00
Registered voters/turnout		424,419	84.58
Lakas hold			
Source: Commission on Elections

== Pampanga ==
=== 1st district ===
2025 Pampanga's 1st congressional district election
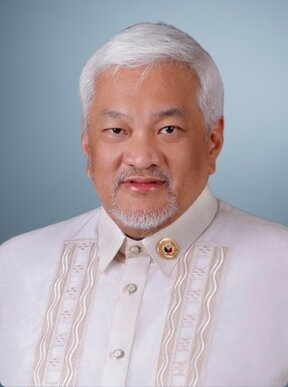
Candidate	Carmelo Lazatin Jr.
Party	PFP
Popular vote	262,517
Percentage	100.00%
House representative before election
Carmelo Lazatin II
Lakas
Elected House representative
Carmelo Lazatin Jr.
PFP

Term-limited incumbent Carmelo Lazatin II of Lakas–CMD ran for mayor of Angeles City. He was previously affiliated with PDP–Laban.

Lazatin endorsed his half-brother, Angeles City mayor Carmelo Lazatin Jr. (Partido Federal ng Pilipinas), who won the election unopposed.

Candidate	Party	Votes	%
Carmelo Lazatin Jr.	Partido Federal ng Pilipinas	262,517	100.00
Total		262,517	100.00
Valid votes		262,517	72.26
Invalid/blank votes		100,757	27.74
Total votes		363,274	100.00
Registered voters/turnout		441,218	82.33
PFP gain from Lakas			
Source: Commission on Elections

=== 2nd district ===
2025 Pampanga's 2nd congressional district election
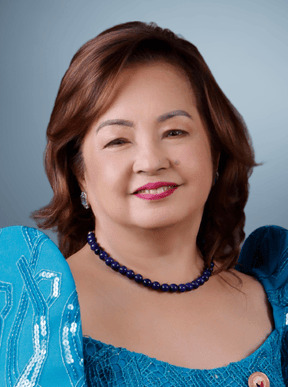
Candidate	Gloria Macapagal Arroyo
Party	Lakas
Popular vote	227,254
Percentage	100.00%
House representative before election
Gloria Macapagal Arroyo
Lakas
Elected House representative
Gloria Macapagal Arroyo
Lakas

Incumbent Gloria Macapagal Arroyo of Lakas–CMD won re-election for a second term unopposed.

Candidate	Party	Votes	%
Gloria Macapagal Arroyo (incumbent)	Lakas–CMD	227,254	100.00
Total		227,254	100.00
Valid votes		227,254	72.26
Invalid/blank votes		87,235	27.74
Total votes		314,489	100.00
Registered voters/turnout		372,379	84.45
Lakas hold			
Source: Commission on Elections

=== 3rd district ===
2025 Pampanga's 3rd congressional district election
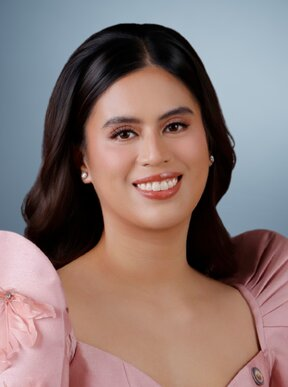

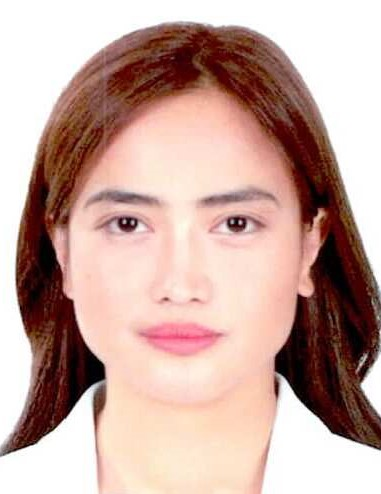
Candidate	Mica Gonzales	Hazel Tumang
Party	Lakas	Nacionalista
Popular vote	213,914	165,155
Percentage	55.07%	42.52%
House representative before election
Aurelio Gonzales Jr.
Lakas
Elected House representative
Mica Gonzales
Lakas

Incumbent Aurelio Gonzales Jr. of Lakas–CMD was term-limited. He was previously affiliated with PDP–Laban.

Lakas–CMD nominated Gonzales' daughter, provincial board member Mica Gonzales, who won the election against two other candidates.

Candidate	Party	Votes	%
Mica Gonzales	Lakas–CMD	213,914	55.07
Hazel Tumang	Nacionalista Party	165,155	42.52
Paul Quiwa	Aksyon Demokratiko	9,346	2.41
Total		388,415	100.00
Valid votes		388,415	94.54
Invalid/blank votes		22,446	5.46
Total votes		410,861	100.00
Registered voters/turnout		475,143	86.47
Lakas hold			
Source: Commission on Elections

=== 4th district ===
2025 Pampanga's 4th congressional district election
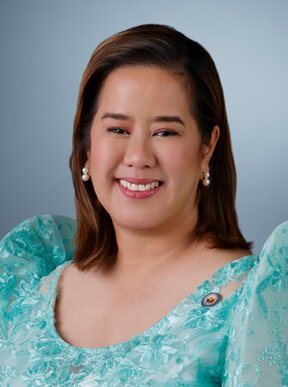

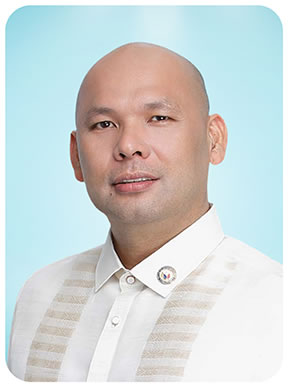
Candidate	Anna York Bondoc	Jorge Antonio Bustos
Party	Nacionalista	Independent
Popular vote	203,602	105,944
Percentage	65.32%	33.99%
House representative before election
Anna York Bondoc
Nacionalista
Elected House representative
Anna York Bondoc
Nacionalista

Incumbent Anna York Bondoc of the Nacionalista Party ran for a second term.

Bondoc won re-election against Patrol party-list representative Jorge Antonio Bustos (Independent) and Edgar Puno (Independent).

Candidate	Party	Votes	%
Anna York Bondoc (incumbent)	Nacionalista Party	203,602	65.32
Jorge Antonio Bustos	Independent	105,944	33.99
Edgar Puno	Independent	2,156	0.69
Total		311,702	100.00
Valid votes		311,702	94.48
Invalid/blank votes		18,207	5.52
Total votes		329,909	100.00
Registered voters/turnout		386,049	85.46
Nacionalista hold			
Source: Commission on Elections

== Tarlac ==
=== 1st district ===
2025 Tarlac's 1st congressional district election
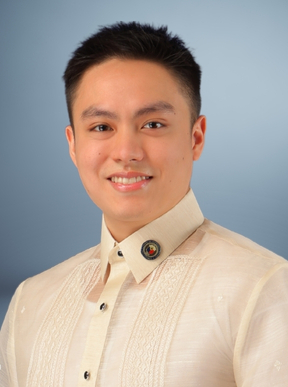
Candidate	Jaime Cojuangco
Party	NPC
Popular vote	182,032
Percentage	100.00%
House representative before election
Jaime Cojuangco
NPC
Elected House representative
Jaime Cojuangco
NPC

Incumbent Jaime Cojuangco of the Nationalist People's Coalition won re-election for a second term unopposed.

Candidate	Party	Votes	%
Jaime Cojuangco (incumbent)	Nationalist People's Coalition	182,032	100.00
Total		182,032	100.00
Valid votes		182,032	72.86
Invalid/blank votes		67,821	27.14
Total votes		249,853	100.00
Registered voters/turnout		285,992	87.36
NPC hold			
Source: Commission on Elections

=== 2nd district ===
2025 Tarlac's 2nd congressional district election
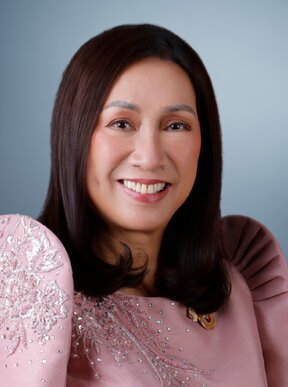
		SST
Candidate	Cristy Angeles	Victor Yap
Party	PFP	SST
Popular vote	167,716	143,868
Percentage	53.83%	46.17%
House representative before election
Christian Yap
SST
Elected House representative
Cristy Angeles
PFP

Incumbent Christian Yap of Sama Sama Tarlac initially ran for a second term, but later retired to run for governor of Tarlac.

Sama Sama Tarlac substituted Yap with his uncle, former representative Victor Yap, who was defeated by Tarlac City mayor Cristy Angeles of Partido Federal ng Pilipinas.

Candidate	Party	Votes	%
Cristy Angeles	Partido Federal ng Pilipinas	167,716	53.83
Victor Yap	Sama Sama Tarlac	143,868	46.17
Total		311,584	100.00
Valid votes		311,584	97.38
Invalid/blank votes		8,381	2.62
Total votes		319,965	100.00
Registered voters/turnout		355,968	89.89
PFP gain from SST			
Source: Commission on Elections

=== 3rd district ===
2025 Tarlac's 3rd congressional district election
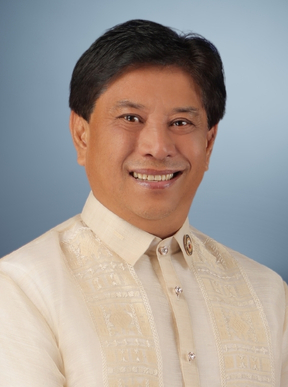
		PFP
Candidate	Noel Rivera	Fernando David
Party	NPC	PFP
Popular vote	167,716	25,243
Percentage	53.83%	11.49%
House representative before election
Noel Rivera
NPC
Elected House representative
Noel Rivera
NPC

Incumbent Bong Rivera of the Nationalist People's Coalition ran for a second term.

Rivera won re-election against three other candidates.

Candidate	Party	Votes	%
Bong Rivera (incumbent)	Nationalist People's Coalition	186,630	84.94
Fernando David	Partido Federal ng Pilipinas	25,243	11.49
Son Marimla	Independent	4,232	1.93
Steve Liwanag	Independent	3,614	1.64
Total		219,719	100.00
Valid votes		219,719	85.21
Invalid/blank votes		38,132	14.79
Total votes		257,851	100.00
Registered voters/turnout		294,043	87.69
NPC hold			
Source: Commission on Elections

== Zambales ==
=== 1st district ===
2025 Zambales's 1st congressional district election
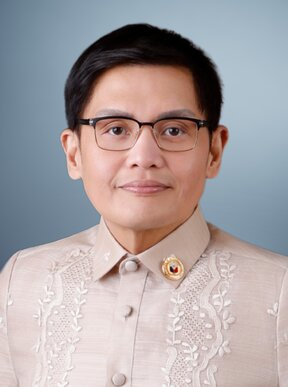
Candidate	Jay Khonghun
Party	Lakas
Popular vote	160,887
Percentage	100.00%
House representative before election
Jay Khonghun
Lakas
Elected House representative
Jay Khonghun
Lakas

Incumbent Jay Khonghun of Lakas–CMD won re-election for a second term unopposed. He was previously affiliated with the Nacionalista Party.

Candidate	Party	Votes	%
Jay Khonghun (incumbent)	Lakas–CMD	160,887	100.00
Total		160,887	100.00
Valid votes		160,887	80.79
Invalid/blank votes		38,250	19.21
Total votes		199,137	100.00
Registered voters/turnout		253,317	78.61
Lakas hold			
Source: Commission on Elections

=== 2nd district ===
2025 Zambales's 2nd congressional district election
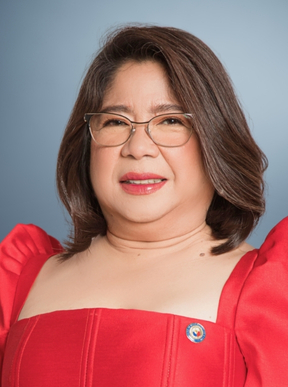
		NPC
Candidate	Bing Maniquiz	Cheryl Deloso-Montalla
Party	Lakas	NPC
Popular vote	173,074	79,928
Percentage	68.41%	31.59%
House representative before election
Bing Maniquiz
Lakas
Elected House representative
Bing Maniquiz
Lakas

Incumbent Bing Maniquiz of Lakas–CMD ran for a second term. She was previously affiliated with the Sulong Zambales Party.

Maniquiz won re-election against former representative Cheryl Deloso-Montalla (Nationalist People's Coalition).

Candidate	Party	Votes	%
Bing Maniquiz (incumbent)	Lakas–CMD	173,074	68.41
Cheryl Deloso-Montalla	Nationalist People's Coalition	79,928	31.59
Total		253,002	100.00
Valid votes		253,002	97.27
Invalid/blank votes		7,114	2.73
Total votes		260,116	100.00
Registered voters/turnout		298,819	87.05
Lakas hold			
Source: Commission on Elections
