= Mika Suansing =

Filipino politician (born 1991)

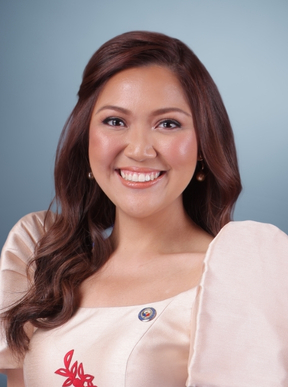
- Official portrait, 2025

Member of the Philippine House of Representatives from Nueva Ecija's 1st district
- Incumbent
- Assumed office June 30, 2022
- Preceded by: Ging Suansing

Chairperson of the House Committee on Appropriations
- Incumbent
- Assumed office July 29, 2025
- Preceded by: Zaldy Co

Personal details
- Born: Mikaela Angela Bito-onon Suansing; October 24, 1991 (age 35) Quezon City, Philippines
- Party: PFP (2026–present); Unang Sigaw (local party; 2021–present)
- Other political affiliations: Lakas (2024–2026); Nacionalista (2021–2024)
- Spouse: Napoleon Interior (m. 2025)
- Education: Ateneo de Manila University (BS); Harvard University (MPP)
- Occupation: Politician

Mikaela Angela "Mika" Bito-onon Suansing (born October 24, 1991) is a Filipino politician who has served as the representative of Nueva Ecija's first district since 2022. Born to a political family in Nueva Ecija, she is a member of Partido Federal ng Pilipinas and the local party Unang Sigaw.

== Early life and education ==
Mika Suansing was born on October 24, 1991, in Quezon City. She is the daughter of former representatives Horacio Suansing Jr. and Estrellita "Ging" Suansing, who represented Sultan Kudarat and Nueva Ecija in Congress, respectively. Her younger sister, Bella Vanessa, has served as the representative for Sultan Kudarat's second district since 2025.

Suansing studied at the Philippine Science High School. She graduated with a Bachelor of Science degree in Management Engineering from the Ateneo de Manila University and later earned a Master in Public Policy degree from Harvard University in the United States. During her mother's tenure in Congress, Suansing served as her chief of staff.

== House of Representatives ==
=== Elections ===
In the 2022 elections, Suansing ran for Congress in Nueva Ecija's first district under the Nacionalista Party. She defeated her opponents, Rommel Padilla of PDP–Laban and Alex Balutan of the Reform Philippines (RP) Party. She was re-elected as a representative in 2025.

=== Tenure ===
Since assuming office on June 30, 2022, Suansing has focused on legislation aimed at improving education, healthcare, and economic development in her district.

In 2024, Suansing joined the Lakas–CMD party, aligning herself with the national political coalition. On July 29, 2025, a day after the opening of the 20th Congress, she was named chairperson of the House Committee on Appropriations. During the same Congress, she is also the vice chairperson of the House Committee on Basic Education and Culture and a member of 10 other committees. During her time as chair of the House Committee on Appropriations, the House passed the proposed national budget of ₱6.79 trillion for 2026 and ₱7.2 trillion for 2027—both the highest in history at their respective times of passage.

== Personal life ==
Suansing married Napoleon Interior, then a member of the Nueva Ecija Provincial Board, at a wedding ceremony in Bali, Indonesia, in January 2025.

== Electoral history ==
Electoral history of Mika Suansing
| Year | Office | Party | | Votes received | | | | Result |
| Year | Office | Local | National | Total | % | P. | Swing | Result |
|---|---|---|---|---|---|---|---|---|
| 2022 | Representative (Nueva Ecija–1st) | Unang Sigaw | Nacionalista | 171,946 | 58.77% | 1st | —N/a | Won |
| 2025 | Representative (Nueva Ecija–1st) | Unang Sigaw | Lakas | 234,820 | 83.62% | 1st | —N/a | Won |
