= Mapanuepe Lake =

Freshwater lake in Zambales, Philippines

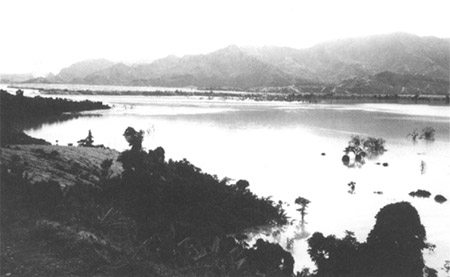
- The lake in 1992 with the three settlements already submerged

- Location within the Philippines
- Location: Zambales, Luzon Island
- Coordinates: 14°59′0″N 120°17′30″E
- Type: Lahar-dammed lake
- Primary inflows: Mapanuepe and Marella River
- Primary outflows: Santo Tomas River
- Basin countries: Philippines
- First flooded: 1991-1992
- Max. length: 4.1 kilometres (2.5 mi)
- Max. width: 2.5 kilometres (1.6 mi)
- Surface area: 648 hectares (1,600 acres)
- Max. depth: 25 metres (82 ft)
- Shore length^{1}: 33 kilometres (21 mi)
- Surface elevation: 129 metres (423 ft)
- Islands: Ten small islets
- Settlements: San Marcelino
- ^{1} Shore length is not a well-defined measure.

Mapanuepe Lake is a freshwater lake located in the municipality of San Marcelino, Zambales in the Philippines. The lake was created after the cataclysmic eruption of Mount Pinatubo in 1991. Lahars following the eruption blocked the drainage of Mapanuepe River, south of the volcano, flooding Mapanuepe Valley together with its settlements. Only the steeple of a local village chapel protrudes from the lake’s surface.

== History ==
Mapanuepe lake is located at the confluence of Marella and Mapanuepe Rivers as the two rivers merge to become the Santo Tomas River. The rains after the 1991 eruption of Mount Pinatubo produced lahar that dumped volcanic debris into the Marella River, one of the major drainages of the mountain, aggrading the river and eventually damming the Mapanuepe River.

Rising waters drowned the Mapanuepe Valley including the barangays of Aglao (lower), Buhawen and Pili of San Marcelino, Zambales. During the formation of the lake, breaching and reforming of the debris dam occurred after each lahar flow. At its maximum extent, the lake grew to an area of 670 hectares (1,700 acres) and had a stored water volume of 75 × 10^{6} cubic meters (98,000,000 cu yd) before reaching its current size.

Presently, the only structure visible above the lake’s surface is the steeple and large metal cross of Saint Barbara’s Chapel, a visita which once served Barangay Buhawen. Prior to the 1991 eruption, studies of geologic formations and sediments of Mapanuepe Valley showed that the area was the site of a similar, lahar-formed lake from much older eruptions.

== Water quality ==
The lake’s water is reportedly contaminated with mercury leaking from the abandoned Dizon Copper Mine on the eastern shore. However, the harmful chemicals are believed to have since been diluted and the water safe for diving and fishing.

== Popular culture ==
- The lake was featured on Episode 10 in the second season of Destination Truth, an American TV show on the Sci-Fi Channel, titled Ahool and Pinatubo Monsters . The Destination Truth team made an investigation following reports by local fishermen of mysterious, giant, and black fish-like creatures swimming on the lake labeled as the "Pinatubo Monster" by the show.
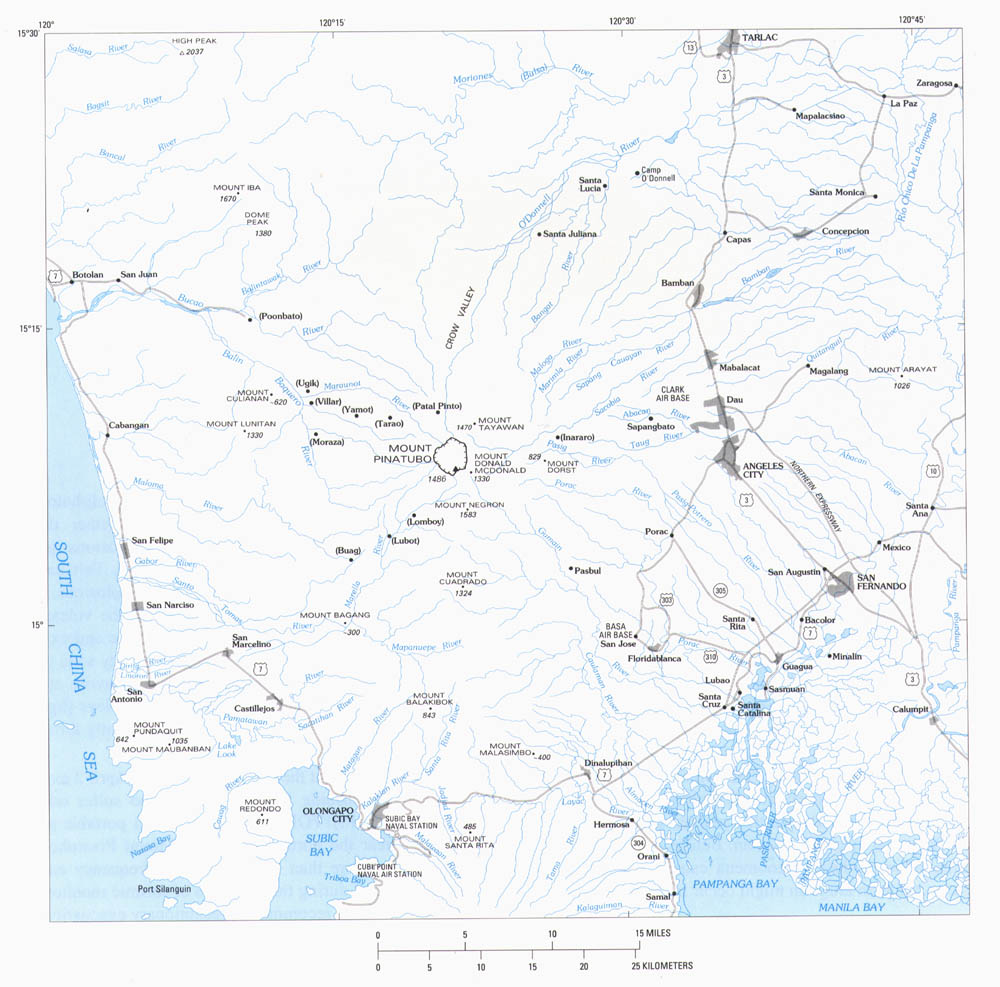
Map of the major rivers originating from Mount Pinatubo

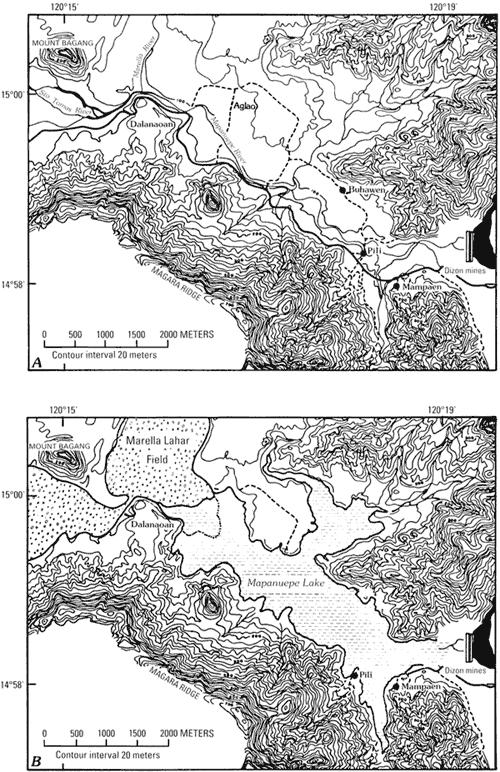
Mapanuepe Lake before the eruption and after the formation in 1991

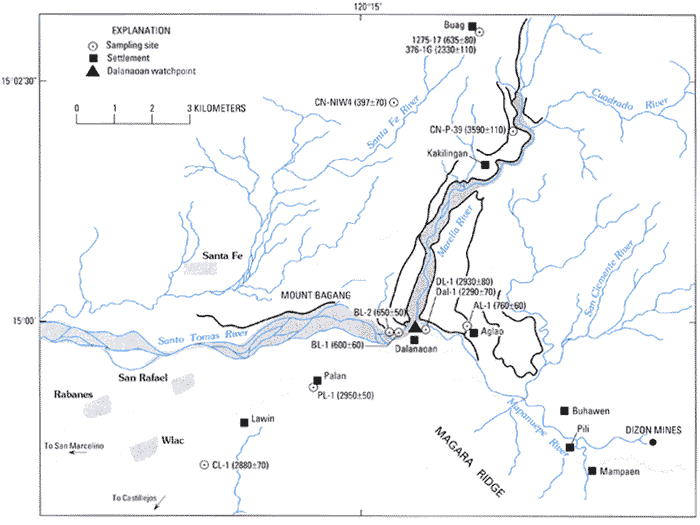
A closer look at the confluence of Marella and Mapanuepe Rivers before the eruption with the location of the old settlements that were submerged

== See also ==
- Lakes in the Philippines
- Pantabangan, a similarly drowned town
