= Doris Maniquiz =

Filipino politician (born 1964)

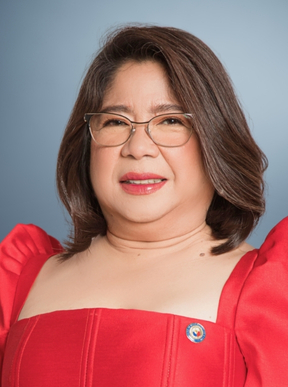
- Official portrait, 2025

Member of the House of Representatives from Zambales’s 2nd District
- Incumbent
- Assumed office June 30, 2022
- Preceded by: Cheryl Deloso-Montalla

Mayor of Botolan
- In office June 30, 2013 – June 30, 2022
- Vice Mayor: Nick Manzo (2013–2016); Doris Ladines (2016–2022)
- Preceded by: Nerma Yap
- Succeeded by: Jun Omar Ebdane

Personal details
- Born: Doris Ecdao Maniquiz; October 20, 1964 (age 61)
- Party: Lakas (2022–present); SZP (local party; 2012–present)
- Other political affiliations: PDP–Laban (2018–2022)
- Education: Mapúa Institute of Technology (BS)
- Occupation: Politician

Doris "Bing" Ecdao Maniquiz (born October 20, 1964) is a Filipino politician. She is currently serving as representative for the 2nd District of Zambales in the House of Representatives of the Philippines since 2022. She served as mayor of Botolan from 2013 to 2022.

== Early life and education ==
Maniquiz was born on October 20, 1964. She studied Mapúa Institute of Technology with the degree of electronics and communications engineering.

== Political career ==
=== Mayor of Botolan (2013–2022) ===
In 2013, Maniquiz was elected as mayor of Botolan where she served for three consecutive terms.

=== House of Representatives (2022–present) ===
In the May 2022 election, Maniquiz was elected as representative for second district of Zambales. She joined the Lakas–CMD party in June 2022, ahead of the convening of the 19th Congress. She got re-elected in the 2025 election with Cheryl Deloso-Montalla as her closest rival.

== Electoral history ==
Electoral history of Doris Maniquiz
Year	Office	Party		Votes received				Result
Year	Office	Local	National	Total	%	P.	Swing	Result
2013	Mayor of Botolan	SZP	—N/a	15,696	55.01%	1st	—N/a	Won
2016	Mayor of Botolan	SZP	—N/a	19,012	—N/a	1st	—N/a	Won
2019	Mayor of Botolan	SZP	PDP–Laban	24,316	73.59%	1st	—N/a	Won
2022	Representative (Zambales–2nd)	SZP	PDP–Laban	144,060	62.13%	1st	—N/a	Won
2025	Representative (Zambales–2nd)	SZP	Lakas	173,074	68.41%	1st	—N/a	Won

== See also ==
- List of female members of the House of Representatives of the Philippines
