= Castillejos =

Municipality in Zambales, Philippines

- Municipality
- Municipality of Castillejos
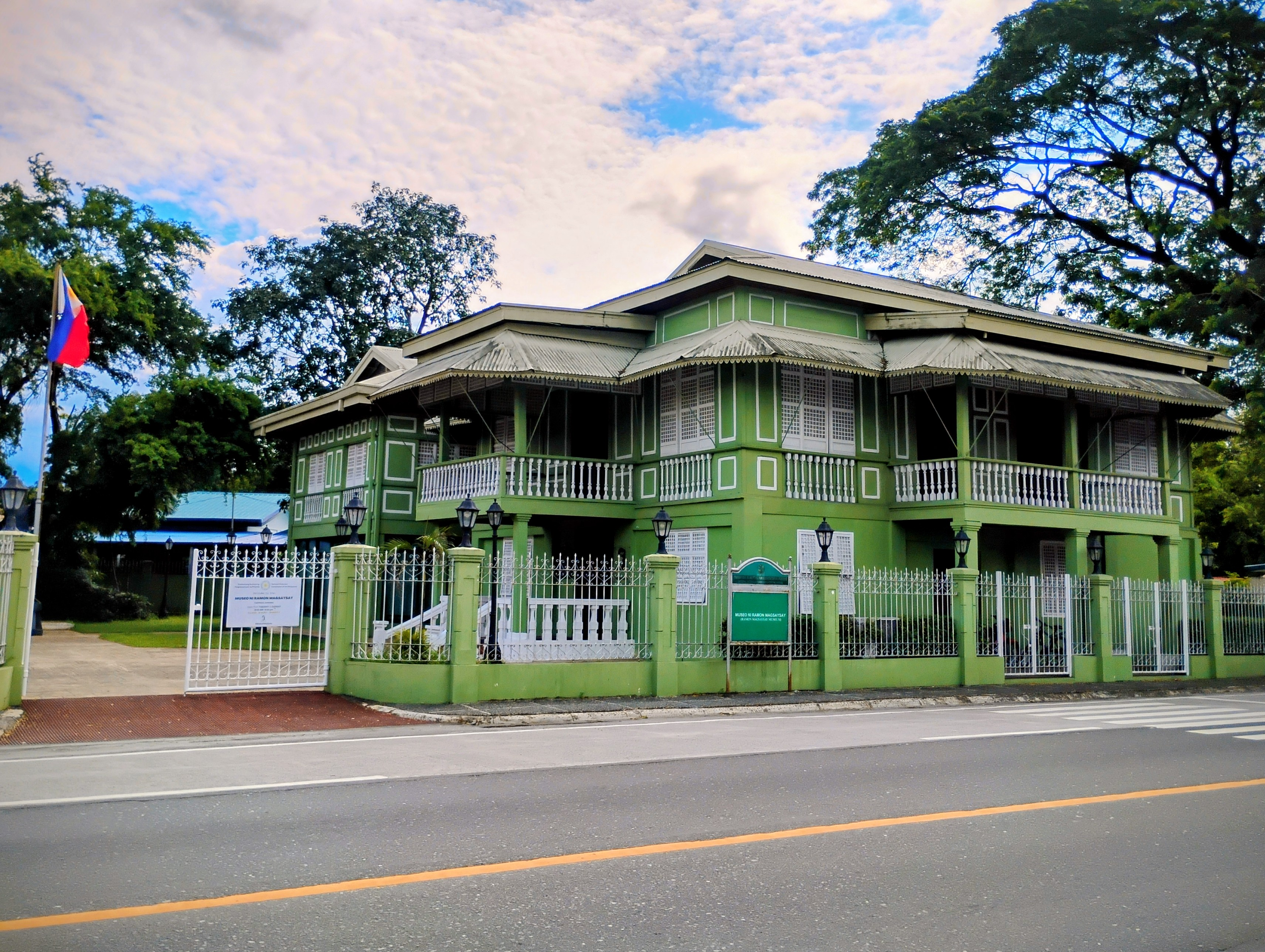
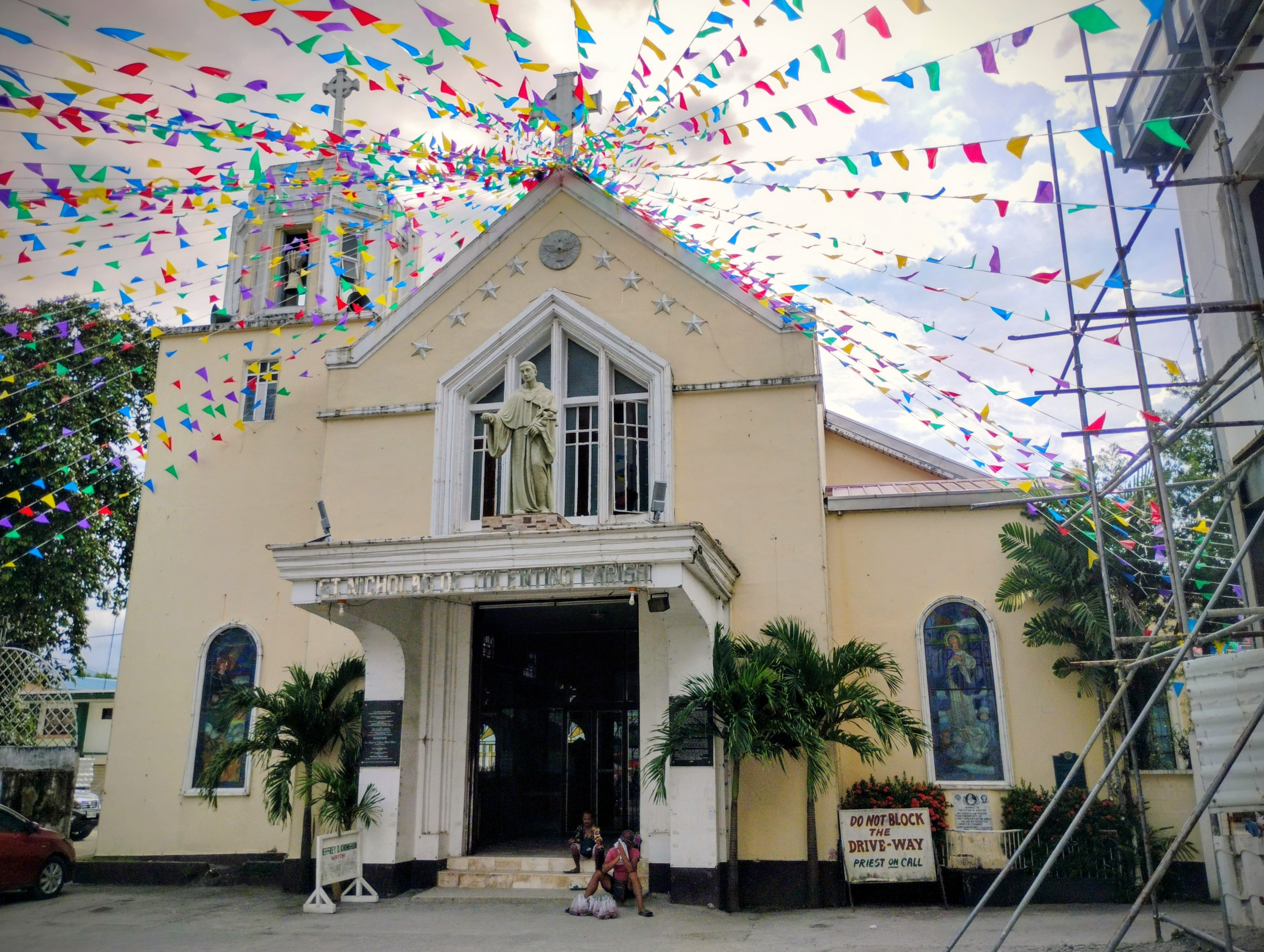
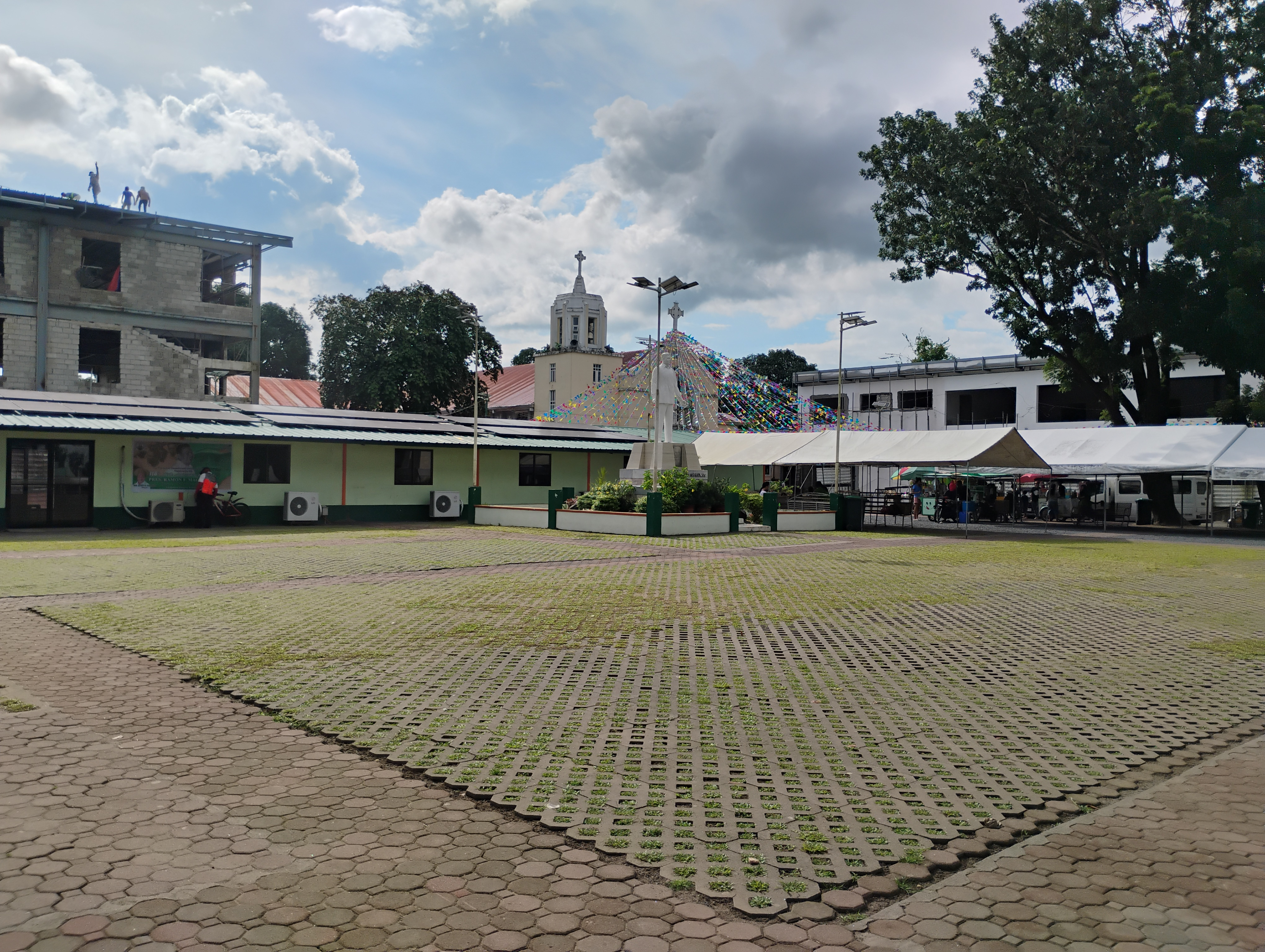
- Ramon Magsaysay Ancestral House Saint Nicholas of Tolentino Parish Church Castillejos Town Plaza

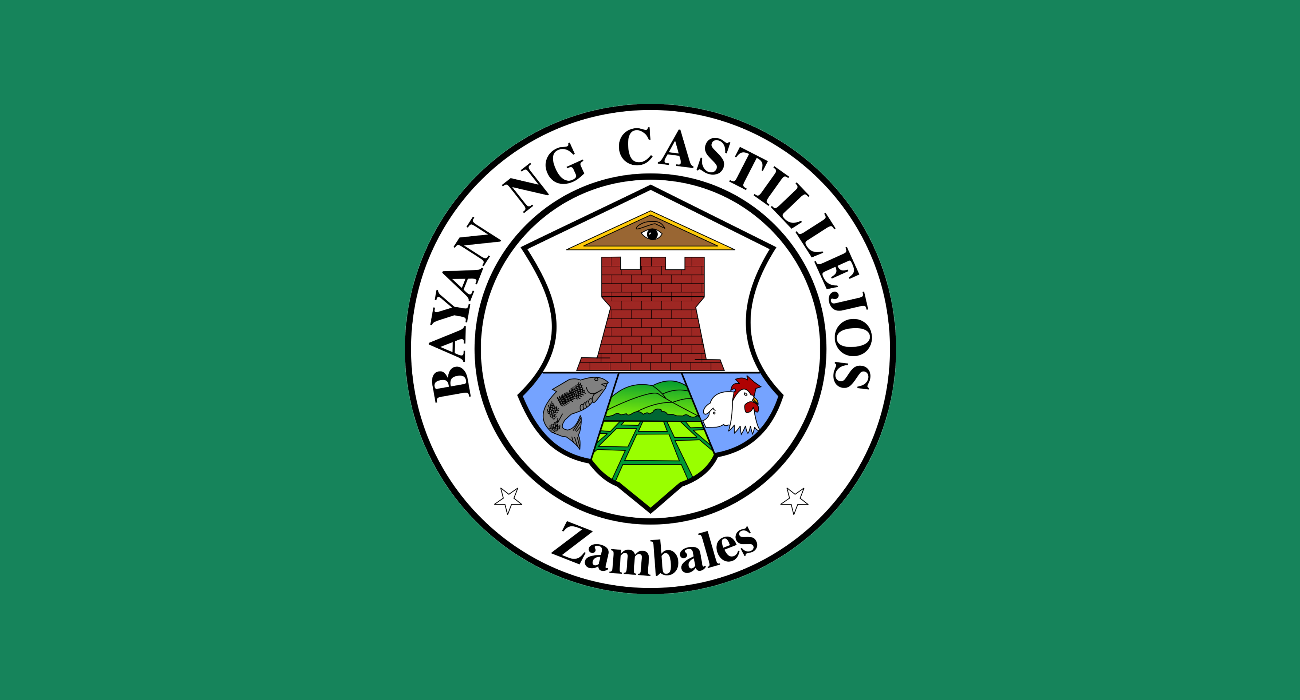
- Flag Seal

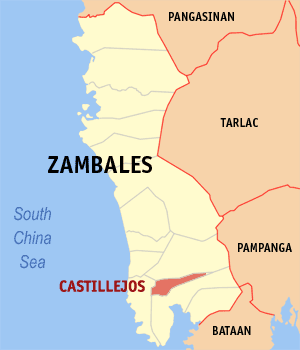
- Map of Zambales with Castillejos highlighted
- Interactive map of Castillejos
- Location within the Philippines
- Coordinates: 14°56′N 120°12′E
- Country: Philippines
- Region: Central Luzon
- Province: Zambales
- District: 1st district
- Founded: 1743
- Reestablished: January 1, 1910
- Barangays: 14 (see Barangays)

Government
  - Type: Sangguniang Bayan
  - Mayor: Jeffrey D. Khonghun
  - Vice Mayor: Christian Esposo
  - Representative: Jefferson "Jay" F. Khonghun
  - Municipal Council: Members: Maria Cecilia F. Rafanan; Voltaire Avera; Albert R. Tugadi; Jorge Ablao; Francis Villanueva; Oda R. Guevarra; Romeo Calimlim; Arturo P. Manzano
  - Electorate: 36,919 voters (2025)

Area
  - Total: 92.99 km^{2} (35.90 sq mi)
- Elevation: 72 m (236 ft)

Population (2024 census)
  - Total: 70,105
  - Density: 753.9/km^{2} (1,953/sq mi)
  - Households: 17,662

Economy
  - Income class: 1st municipal income class
  - Poverty incidence: 15.07% (2023)
  - Revenue: ₱ 336.6 million (2024)
  - Assets: ₱ 865.5 million (2024)
  - Expenditure: ₱ 308.4 million (2024)
  - Liabilities: ₱ 100.3 million (2024)

Service provider
  - Electricity: Zambales 2 Electric Cooperative (ZAMECO 2)
- Time zone: UTC+8 (PST)
- ZIP code: 2208
- PSGC: 0307104000
- IDD : area code: +63 (0)47
- Native languages: Sambal; Ilocano; Tagalog; Ambala; Mag-antsi
- Website: castillejos.com.ph

Castillejos, officially the Municipality of Castillejos (Ilocano: Ili ti Castillejos; Tagalog: Bayan ng Castillejos), is a municipality in the province of Zambales, Philippines. According to the 2024 census, it has a population of 70,105 people.

== History ==
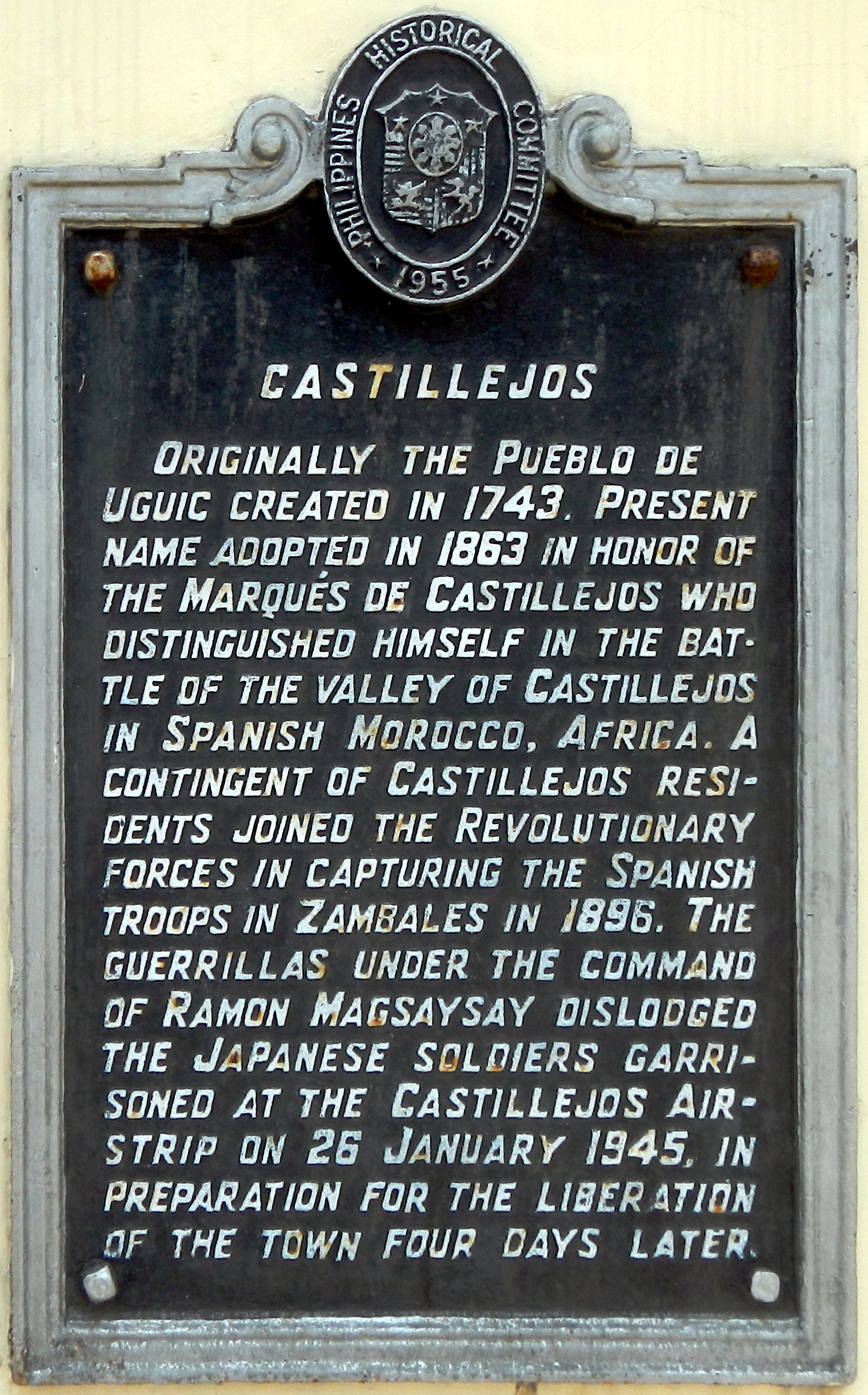
Historical marker installed in 1955 at the municipal hall

Castillejos was established in 1743 by Tagalog settler families who migrated from Bataan.

=== Third Republic ===
On November 3, 1962, Mayor Dominador Bundang and nearly 3,000 other Nacionalista officials in Zambales joined the Liberal Party, aligning themselves with the Macapagal administration.

=== Contemporary era ===
On April 22, 2019, a strong magnitude 6.1 earthquake occurred at 5:11 pm local time (UTC+08:00) according to PHIVOLCS.

== Geography ==
Castillejos is located on the Olongapo–Bugallon Road between San Antonio, Subic, and San Marcelino. It is 57 kilometres (35 mi) from Iba, 21 kilometres (13 mi) from Olongapo, and 147 kilometres (91 mi) from Manila.

=== Barangays ===
Castillejos is politically subdivided into 14 barangays, as indicated below. Each barangay consists of puroks and some have sitios.

- Balaybay
- Buenavista
- Del Pilar
- Looc
- Magsaysay
- Nagbayan
- Nagbunga
- San Agustin (Poblacion)
- San Jose (Poblacion)
- San Juan (Poblacion)
- San Nicolas
- San Pablo (Poblacion)
- San Roque
- Santa Maria (Poblacion)

=== Climate ===
Climate data for Castillejos, Zambales
Month	Jan	Feb	Mar	Apr	May	Jun	Jul	Aug	Sep	Oct	Nov	Dec	Year
Mean daily maximum °C (°F)	30 (86)	31 (88)	33 (91)	34 (93)	32 (90)	31 (88)	29 (84)	29 (84)	29 (84)	30 (86)	30 (86)	30 (86)	31 (87)
Mean daily minimum °C (°F)	19 (66)	19 (66)	20 (68)	22 (72)	24 (75)	24 (75)	24 (75)	24 (75)	24 (75)	23 (73)	21 (70)	20 (68)	22 (72)
Average precipitation mm (inches)	8 (0.3)	9 (0.4)	15 (0.6)	34 (1.3)	138 (5.4)	203 (8.0)	242 (9.5)	233 (9.2)	201 (7.9)	126 (5.0)	50 (2.0)	21 (0.8)	1,280 (50.4)
Average rainy days	3.7	4.1	6.5	11.2	21.2	24.9	27.7	26.5	25.5	21.8	12.6	5.6	191.3
Source: Meteoblue (Use with caution: this is modeled/calculated data, not measured locally.)

== Demographics ==
Population census of Castillejos
Year	Pop.	±% p.a.
1903	3,068	—
1918	4,491	+2.57%
1939	5,362	+0.85%
1948	7,699	+4.10%
1960	10,049	+2.24%
1970	14,807	+3.95%
1975	17,999	+3.99%
1980	19,154	+1.25%
1990	26,753	+3.40%
1995	28,357	+1.10%
2000	33,108	+3.38%
2007	42,910	+3.64%
2010	48,845	+4.83%
2015	64,841	+5.54%
2020	67,889	+0.97%
2024	70,105	+0.77%
Source: Philippine Statistics Authority

In the 2024 census, the population of Castillejos was 70,105 people, with a density of 750 inhabitants per square kilometre or 1,900 inhabitants per square mile.

== Economy ==
Poverty incidence of Castillejos (%)

Source: Philippine Statistics Authority

== Education ==
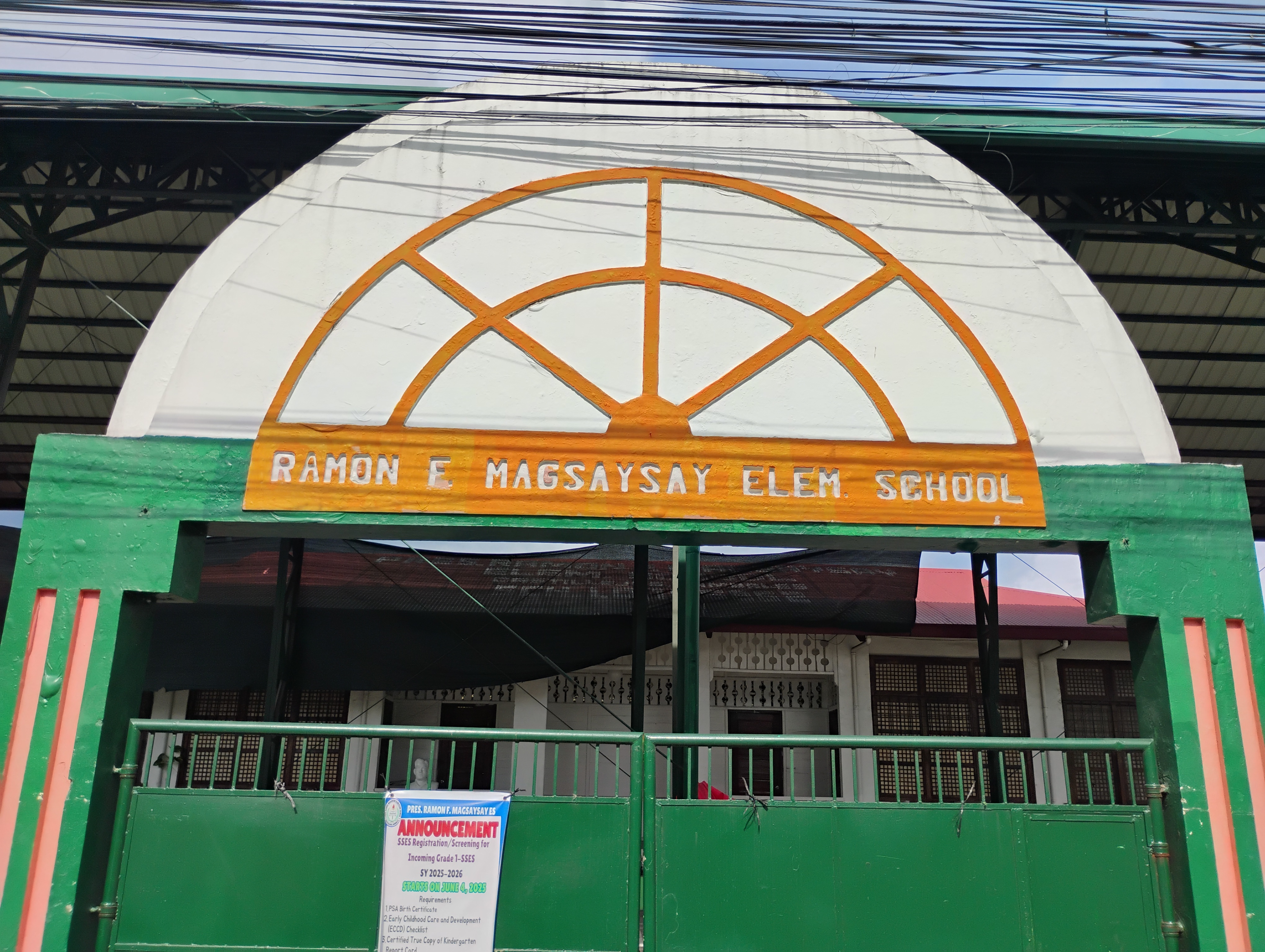
Ramon F. Magsaysay Elementary School

The Castillejos Schools District Office governs all educational institutions within the municipality. It oversees the management and operations of all private and public, from primary to secondary schools.

=== Primary and elementary schools ===
- Balaybay Elementary School
- Balaybay Resettlement Elementary School
- Buenavista Elementary School
- Castillejos Aldergate Learning Center
- Castillejos Elementary School
- Del Pilar Elementary School
- Guardian Angel Child Development Center
- Hanniel Christian Academy
- Kanaynayan Community School
- Looc Elementary School
- Magsaysay Elementary School
- Maranatha Christian Academy
- Mia Angela Montessori
- Nagbayan Elementary School
- Precious Child Montessori (Main)
- Precious Child Montessori (Annex)
- Pres. Ramon F. Magsaysay Elementary School
- San Agustin Elementary School
- San Isidro Elementary School
- San Nicolas Primary School
- Santa Maria Elementary School
- St. Nicholas Academy
- Sta. Maria Elementary School
- To God Be the Glory Christian Academy
- V. Gallardo Elementary School
- Villaflor Elementary School

=== Secondary schools ===
- Castillejos National High School
- Castillejos Resettlement High School
- Jesus F. Magsaysay Technical Vocational High School
- San Agustin High School
- Hanjin Integrated School
- Looc Integrated School
- Precious Heritage of Zambales
- St. Nicolas Academy

=== Higher educational institution ===
- President Ramon Magsaysay State University
