= San Marcelino =

Municipality in Zambales, Philippines

- Municipality
- Municipality of San Marcelino
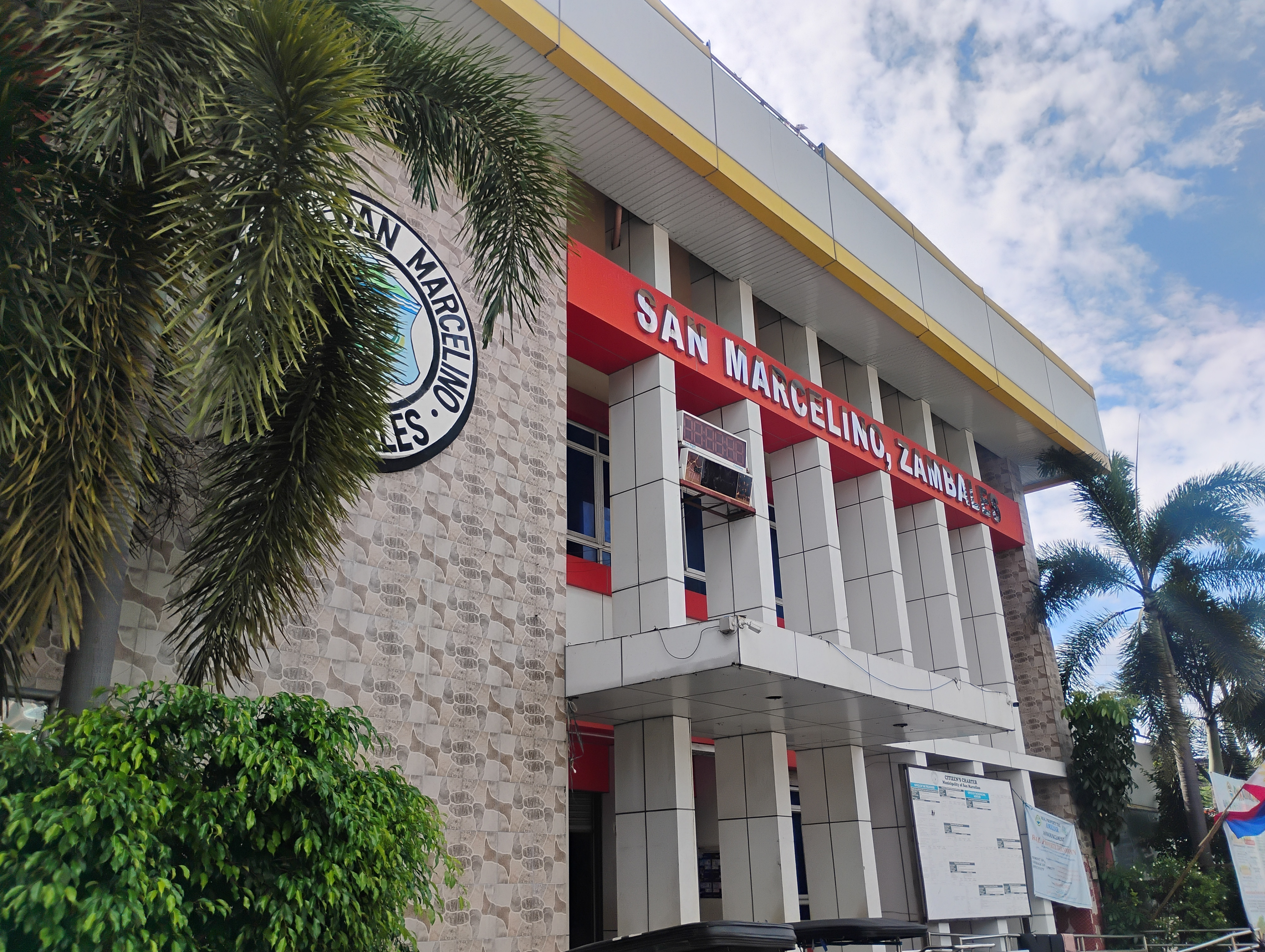
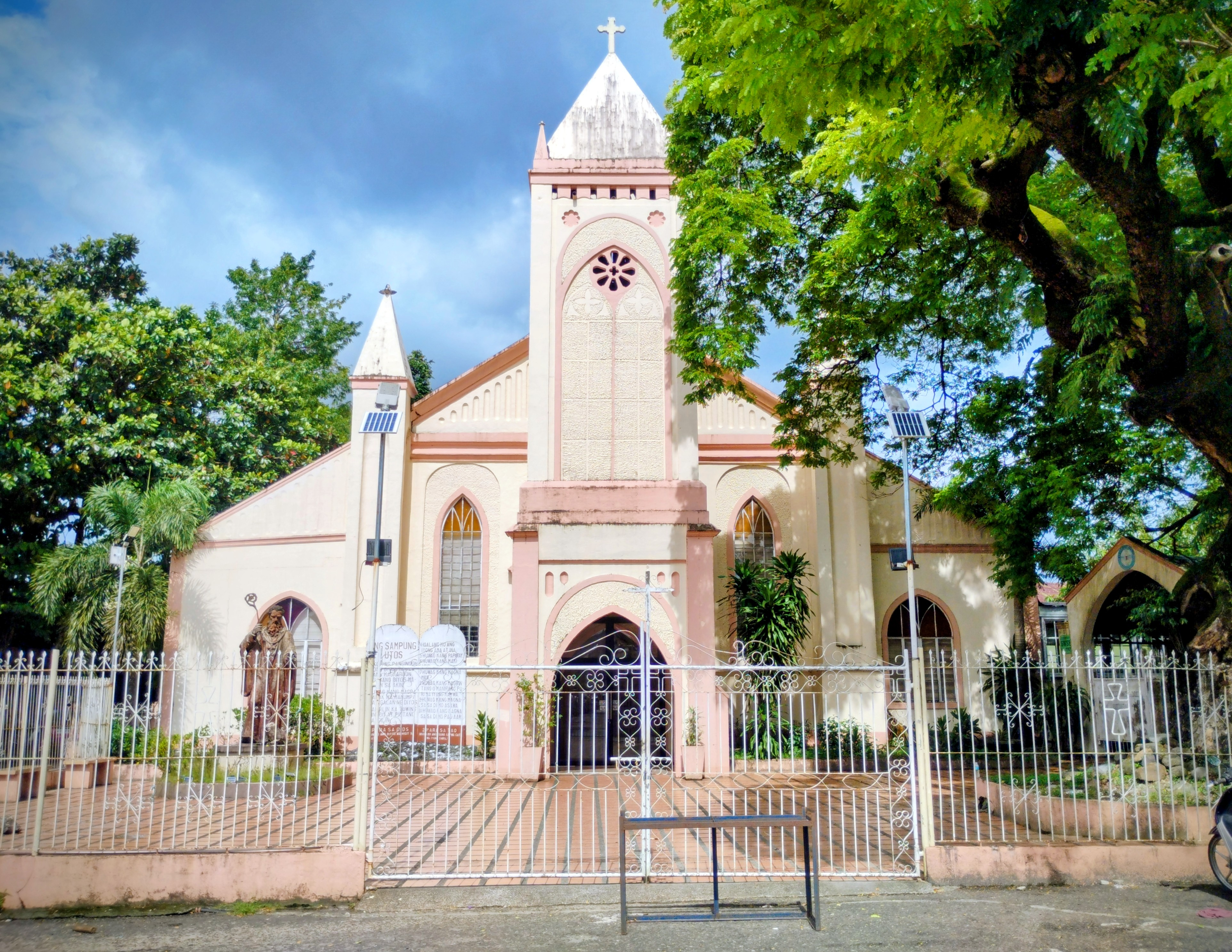
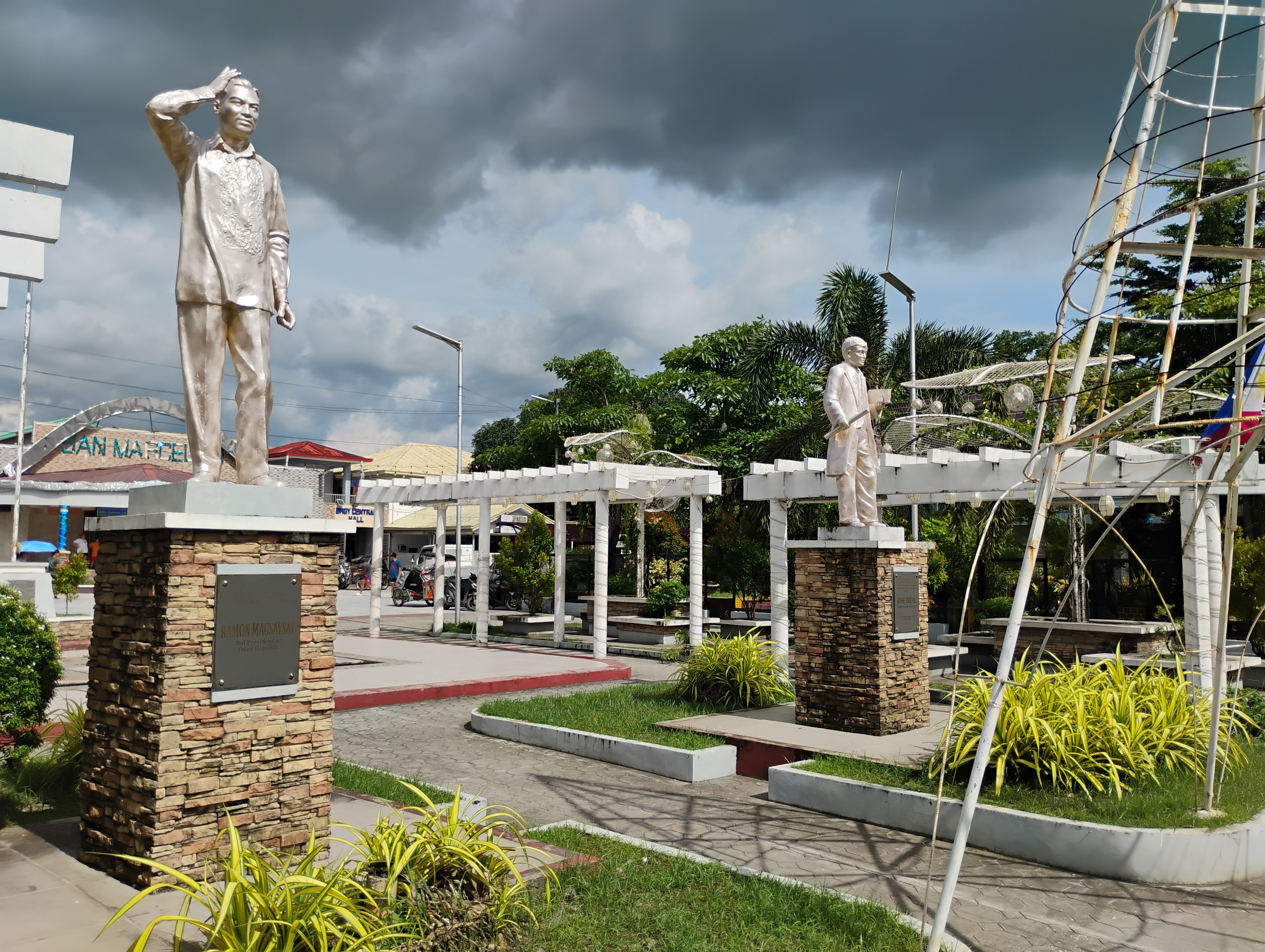
- San Marcelino Municipal Hall Saint William Parish Church San Marcelino Municipal Plaza

- Seal
- Anthem: San Marcelino, Mabuhay Ka!
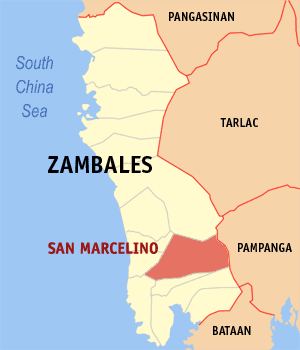
- Map of Zambales with San Marcelino highlighted
- Interactive map of San Marcelino
- Location within the Philippines
- Coordinates: 14°58′27″N 120°09′26″E
- Country: Philippines
- Region: Central Luzon
- Province: Zambales
- District: 1st district
- Founded: 1843
- Named for: Marcelino de Oraá Lecumberri
- Barangays: 18 (see Barangays)

Government
  - Type: Sangguniang Bayan
  - Mayor: Elvis Ragadio Soria
  - Vice Mayor: Christopher "Jimbo" Gongora
  - Representative: Jefferson "Jay" F. Khonghun
  - Municipal Council: Members: Dr. Louella P. Aquino; Jeffrey I. Pimentel; Jose M. Gutierrez, Jr.; Apolinario A. Abelon; Dr. Earl B. Yap; Alex M. Beltran; Engr. Darrel L. Labio; Engr. Jay R. Peralta
  - Electorate: 25,097 voters (2025)

Area
  - Total: 416.86 km^{2} (160.95 sq mi)
- Elevation: 52 m (171 ft)
- Highest elevation: 527 m (1,729 ft)
- Lowest elevation: 16 m (52 ft)

Population (2024 census)
  - Total: 39,542
  - Density: 94.857/km^{2} (245.68/sq mi)
  - Households: 9,773

Economy
  - Income class: 1st municipal income class
  - Poverty incidence: 14.87% (2023)
  - Revenue: ₱ 434.2 million (2024)
  - Assets: ₱ 1,148 million (2024)
  - Expenditure: ₱ 355.9 million (2024)

Service provider
  - Electricity: Zambales 2 Electric Cooperative (ZAMECO 2)
- Time zone: UTC+8 (PST)
- ZIP code: 2207
- PSGC: 0307111000
- IDD : area code: +63 (0)47
- Native languages: Ilocano; Tagalog; Sambal; Ambala; Mag-antsi; Mag-indi

San Marcelino, officially the Municipality of San Marcelino (Ilocano: Ili ti San Marcelino; Tagalog: Bayan ng San Marcelino), is a municipality in the province of Zambales, Philippines. According to the 2024 census, it has a population of 39,542 people.

== Etymology ==
The town got its name after the first Capitan Municipal whose name was Marcelino de Oraá Lecumberri. The people of this municipality during that time were fond of saints, so they added "San" to the name Marcelino, thus making it San Marcelino. The first election was held on January 14, 1906, and Matias Apostol was the first elected president. San Marcelino was christianized after the arrival of Father Guillermo. After his departure, the people chose him as their town's patron saint.

== History ==
=== Early history ===
The area that is now known as San Marcelino was originally owned by Sambal-speaking peoples, but over time was purchased and became entirely owned by Ilocano-speaking peoples, hence the barangay name Laoag, named after one of their origins, Laoag, Ilocos Norte.

Marcelinian civilization, according to old municipal documents, started at the peak of Vega Hill in the heart of an idyllic Zambales jungle. The pre-Hispanic settlers from the Ilocos Region were led by the ancestors of the Corpuses, Udans, Ragadios, Raguinis, Rabanes and Fabunans.

Vega Hill reportedly measured 440.94 square kilometers. It used to be one of the three communities that comprised a town. The two others were what are now known as Castillejos and San Antonio.

Naturally adventurous and united by their common struggles, the Ilocano settlers eventually left Vega Hill and stayed in Magaring, a place now known as Barangay Linasin. This area was, and still is, part of the town. Eventually, the Ilocanos decided to settle at the Poblacion. However, they refused to be integrated into the communities of the local residents. They lived according to their own traditions. They were governed by their obedience to their community elders.

=== Spanish colonization era ===
When the Spaniards came, a Spanish friar, Father Guillermo, stayed at the Poblacion with the Marcelinian forefathers. In the succeeding years, more Spanish friars came, strengthening the stronghold of Christianity among the Ilocano settlers. The need for formalizing a political/administrative structure of the town also became evident as the population increased and the socio-economic life of the town became complex.

Consequently, a government structure was set up under the leadership of the friars whose power, at this point in time, had become entrenched, and deeply anchored in religion. The friars appointed local or district leaders, a cabeza de barangay for every barangay, among which were Consuelo, Nagbunga and Sinnerrekan (now known as Linusungan). The number of barangays has expanded to 18 since then.

In the settlers' barangay of barrio, a middle-aged Teniente del Barrio, Marcelino Ora, was appointed. It was after him that the town was eventually named, long after he was gone. "San" was arbitrarily added to the name due to the people's religiosity. Domingo Magsaysay and Antonio Rolls later succeeded him.

When the barangay needed to choose a patron saint, the leaders chose the priest who christianized the town, Father Guillermo. By that time the priest had already left San Marcelino. Like Marcelino Ora, the title of Saint was apparently just attached to his name.

The San Guillermo Parish Church is in the town square of San Guillermo Poblacion, and is under the control of the Diocese of Iba, as with all other churches in Zambales.

San Marcelino was originally founded by the Ilocano settlers in Castillejos, as it was under the jurisdiction of Castillejos from 1843 to 1846, a barrio of San Narciso from 1846 to 1849, and a barrio of San Antonio from May 1849 to March 1852. Castillejos was reportedly the hub of leadership because when the Ilocanos arrived in the area, the Tagalog-speaking native residents were already organized there. While it was under Castillejos, conflict broke out between the Ilocano and Tagalog settlers due to the refusal of the Ilocanos to obey the town officials who were mostly Tagalog. To ease the enmity between the two groups, the Alcalde Mayor decided to separate San Marcelino from Castillejos.

In 1843, the Marcelinians filed a petition for San Marcelino's elevation to Pueblo through the Teniente Primero, Antonio Ladrido Juliano. In 1846, the petition was approved.

The elation over the appointment of a local leader did not last long. The town elders became discontented over the fact that their appointed leaders turned out to be just nominal leaders. The friars still made decisions in relation to important matters. In addition, the friars reportedly became shockingly abusive.

In anger, many of the leaders and pockets of townspeople joined the insurrectos - rebel groups. On the forefront were Jorge Udan, Francisco Corpus and Alipio Corpus. Relenting to the demands of the majority of the people, the friars later agreed to give the leaders more participation in running their respective districts.

On March 10, 1852, San Marcelino held its first municipal election for a Teniente Absoluto. At this point, historical records became confusing. The next account has dated January 14, 1906 when Matias Apostol was reportedly installed as the first elected President of San Marcelino. From then on, the progressive development of San Marcelino continued under duly elected leaders.

=== American era ===
From late 1900 to March 1902, the 25th Infantry Regiment, operated in Zambales, including San Marcelino, during the Philippine–American War, with elements in San Marcelino in December 1900 and March 1902. During this period, the regiment conducted policing and judiciary functions, such as the prosecution of Elias Agpalo.

In 1904, due to Act Number 945 of the Philippine Commission, San Marcelino's municipal oversight was extended to neighboring Castillejos and San Antonio. That same year, Ilocano was the primary language spoken in San Marcelino, with Tagalog being a secondary language; of the Negrito who lived in Zambales all lived in the jurisdictions of San Marcelino or Botolan. In 1905, per a report produced by the War Department, the areas around San Marcelino were used to cultivate rice, and the people were Ilocano.

== Geography ==
San Marcelino is 51 kilometres (32 mi) from Iba, 27 kilometres (17 mi) from Olongapo, and 153 kilometres (95 mi) from Manila. It is between San Narciso, San Antonio and Castillejos on the Olongapo–Bugallon Road.

The municipality is home to Mapanuepe Lake that formed after the 1991 eruption of Mount Pinatubo.

=== Barangays ===
San Marcelino is politically subdivided into 18 barangays, as indicated below. Each barangay consists of puroks and some have sitios.

- Aglao
- Buhawen
- Burgos (Poblacion)
- Central (Poblacion)
- Consuelo Norte
- Consuelo Sur (Poblacion)
- La Paz (Poblacion)
- Laoag
- Linasin
- Linusungan
- Lucero (Poblacion)
- Nagbunga
- Rabanes
- Rizal (Poblacion)
- San Guillermo (Poblacion)
- San Isidro (Poblacion)
- San Rafael
- Santa Fe

=== Climate ===
Climate data for San Marcelino, Zambales
Month	Jan	Feb	Mar	Apr	May	Jun	Jul	Aug	Sep	Oct	Nov	Dec	Year
Mean daily maximum °C (°F)	30 (86)	31 (88)	33 (91)	34 (93)	32 (90)	31 (88)	29 (84)	29 (84)	29 (84)	30 (86)	31 (88)	30 (86)	31 (87)
Mean daily minimum °C (°F)	19 (66)	19 (66)	20 (68)	23 (73)	24 (75)	25 (77)	24 (75)	24 (75)	24 (75)	23 (73)	21 (70)	20 (68)	22 (72)
Average precipitation mm (inches)	8 (0.3)	9 (0.4)	15 (0.6)	34 (1.3)	138 (5.4)	203 (8.0)	242 (9.5)	233 (9.2)	201 (7.9)	126 (5.0)	50 (2.0)	21 (0.8)	1,280 (50.4)
Average rainy days	3.7	4.1	6.5	11.2	21.2	24.9	27.7	26.5	25.5	21.8	12.6	5.6	191.3
Source: Meteoblue

== Demographics ==
Population census of San Marcelino
Year	Pop.	±% p.a.
1903	5,041	—
1918	6,346	+1.55%
1939	8,409	+1.35%
1948	10,316	+2.30%
1960	13,914	+2.52%
1970	17,801	+2.49%
1975	20,735	+3.11%
1980	24,964	+3.78%
1990	36,598	+3.90%
1995	24,425	−7.30%
2000	25,440	+0.88%
2007	29,052	+1.85%
2010	31,879	+3.44%
2015	33,665	+1.04%
2020	37,719	+2.42%
2024	39,542	+1.14%
Source: Philippine Statistics Authority

In the 2024 census, the population of San Marcelino was 39,542 people, with a density of 95 inhabitants per square kilometre or 250 inhabitants per square mile.

== Economy ==
Poverty incidence of San Marcelino (%)

Source: Philippine Statistics Authority

== San Marcelino Airfield ==
San Marcelino Airfield was built before the war by the Americans. On the morning of 29 January 1945 nearly 35,000 U.S. troops landed just north-west of San Marcelino. Elements of the US 38th Division immediately dashed inland to take the airstrip, but found that Filipino soldiers of the 3rd, 32nd, 33rd, 35th and 36th Infantry Division of the Philippine Commonwealth Army and the recognized guerrillas under the command of Capt. Ramon Magsaysay, later President of the Republic of the Philippines, had secured the field three days earlier.

After the liberation by combined Filipino-American troops in Zambales in 1945, it was developed into a Fifth Air Force command facility as well as an operational airfield. With the end of the war, the airfield was closed and is now part of the town of San Marcelino.

== Education ==
The San Marcelino Schools District Office governs all educational institutions within the municipality. It oversees the management and operations of all private and public, from primary to secondary schools.

Currently, there is only one higher educational institution (HEI) which is President Ramon Magsaysay State University (PRMSU), being administered by CHED for its undergraduate and graduate programs.

=== Primary and elementary schools ===
- Aglao Elementary School
- Baliwet Elementary School
- Best Child Learning Center
- Buhawen Elementary School
- Chiang Chio Te Memorial Aeta School
- Dalanawan Elementary School
- Holy Family Academy
- Judd Hendricks Memornial Aeta School
- Laoag Integrated School
- Lawin Elementary School
- Linasin Elementary School
- Linusungan Elementary School
- My Little Friends Preparatory and Tutorial School
- Nagbunga Elementary School
- Pili Elementary School
- Rabanes Elementary School
- Saint William's School
- San Rafael Elementary School
- San Guillermo Elementary School
- San Marcelino Elementary School
- Sedgwick Academy of Success
- Sta. Fe Elementary School
- Sta. Fe (O-it) Elementary School
- United Nation Women Aeta School

=== Secondary schools ===
- San Marcelino National High School
- San Guillermo National High School
- Buhawen National High School
- Santa Fe National High School
- San Rafael High School
- Laoag Integrated School
- Judd Hendricks Memorial Aeta Integrated School
- Nagbunga Integrated School

=== Higher educational institution ===
- President Ramon Magsaysay State University - San Marcelino Campus, formerly known as Western Luzon Agricultural College (WLAC) and as Ramon Magsaysay Technological University - San Marcelino Campus is a government funded higher education institution in Zambales established in 1910 and converted into a state university in 1998 thus changing its name from Western Luzon Agricultural College to President Ramon Magsaysay State University - San Marcelino Campus under the university system. The main campus of PRMSU is located in the Municipality of Iba, Zambales. The university is named after the province's greatest son and former President of the Republic of the Philippines, President Ramon Magsaysay. Aside from the San Marcelino Campus, it also has satellite campuses in the municipalities of Santa Cruz, Candelaria, Masinloc, Botolan and Castillejos - all in the province of Zambales. The university also offers nursing courses at the Mondriaan Aura College in SBMA under a consortium program. PRMSU is one of the fastest growing state universities in the country. This was proven when the Department of Budget and Management in 2007 classified RMTU as a Level III-A university, thus leveling with established universities in Metro Manila like the University of the Philippines and the Polytechnic University of the Philippines. On February 12, 1998, President Fidel Ramos signed Republic Act 8498 authored by Zambales 2nd District Representative Antonio Magsaysay Diaz. The law integrated the Ramon Magsaysay Polytechnic College in Iba, the Western Luzon Agricultural College in San Marcelino (with campus in the Municipality of Botolan), and the Candelaria School of Fisheries in Candelaria into a university system known as Ramon Magsaysay Technological University. A three- year transition period transpired before the formal operation of the university in 2001. In the same year, Dr. Feliciano S. Rosete was invested as the first president of the university.

== Festivals ==
- Singkamas Festival
- Mango Festival

== Notable people ==
- Raikko Mateo - actor
- José N. Rodríguez - leprologist
