= Zambales's 1st congressional district =

Legislative district of the Philippines

- Constituency for the House of Representatives of the Philippines
- Location of Zambales within the Philippines
- Province: Zambales
- Region: Central Luzon
- Population: 436,317 (2015)
- Electorate: 253,317 (2025)
- Major settlements: 4 LGUs: Cities; Olongapo; Municipalities; Castillejos; San Marcelino; Subic
- Area: 982.01 km^{2} (379.16 sq mi)

Current constituency
- Created: 1987
- Representative: Jefferson F. Khonghun
- Political party: SZP; Lakas
- Congressional bloc: Majority

Zambales's 1st congressional district is one of the two congressional districts of the Philippines in the province of Zambales. It has been represented in the House of Representatives since 1987. The district consists of the city of Olongapo and adjacent municipalities in the southernmost part of Zambales, namely Castillejos, San Marcelino and Subic. It is currently represented in the 20th Congress by Jefferson F. Khonghun of the Sulong Zambales Party (SZP) and Lakas–CMD (Lakas).

== Representation history ==
| # | Image | Member | Term of office | | Congress | Party | Electoral history | Constituent LGUs |
| # | Image | Member | Start | End | Congress | Party | Electoral history | Constituent LGUs |
|---|---|---|---|---|---|---|---|---|
=== Zambales's 1st district for the House of Representatives of the Philippines ===
District created February 2, 1987 from Zambales's at-large district.
| 1 | | Katherine H. Gordon | June 30, 1987 | June 30, 1995 | 8th | Nacionalista | Elected in 1987. | 1987–present Castillejos, Olongapo, San Marcelino, Subic |
| 1 | | Katherine H. Gordon | June 30, 1987 | June 30, 1995 | 9th | NPC (Nacionalista) | Re-elected in 1992. | 1987–present Castillejos, Olongapo, San Marcelino, Subic |
| 2 | | James J. Gordon Jr. | June 30, 1995 | June 30, 2004 | 10th | Nacionalista | Elected in 1995. | 1987–present Castillejos, Olongapo, San Marcelino, Subic |
| 2 | | James J. Gordon Jr. | June 30, 1995 | June 30, 2004 | 11th | Lakas | Re-elected in 1998. | 1987–present Castillejos, Olongapo, San Marcelino, Subic |
| 2 | | James J. Gordon Jr. | June 30, 1995 | June 30, 2004 | 12th | Lakas | Re-elected in 2001. | 1987–present Castillejos, Olongapo, San Marcelino, Subic |
| 3 | | Mitos Magsaysay | June 30, 2004 | June 30, 2013 | 13th | Independent | Elected in 2004. | 1987–present Castillejos, Olongapo, San Marcelino, Subic |
| 3 | | Mitos Magsaysay | June 30, 2004 | June 30, 2013 | 14th | Lakas | Re-elected in 2007. | 1987–present Castillejos, Olongapo, San Marcelino, Subic |
| 3 | | Mitos Magsaysay | June 30, 2004 | June 30, 2013 | 15th | UNA | Re-elected in 2010. | 1987–present Castillejos, Olongapo, San Marcelino, Subic |
| 4 | | Jeffrey D. Khonghun | June 30, 2013 | June 30, 2022 | 16th | NPC | Elected in 2013. | 1987–present Castillejos, Olongapo, San Marcelino, Subic |
| 4 | | Jeffrey D. Khonghun | June 30, 2013 | June 30, 2022 | 17th | Nacionalista | Re-elected in 2016. | 1987–present Castillejos, Olongapo, San Marcelino, Subic |
| 4 | | Jeffrey D. Khonghun | June 30, 2013 | June 30, 2022 | 18th | Nacionalista | Re-elected in 2019. | 1987–present Castillejos, Olongapo, San Marcelino, Subic |
| 5 | | Jay Khonghun | June 30, 2022 | Incumbent | 19th | Lakas (SZP) | Elected in 2022. | 1987–present Castillejos, Olongapo, San Marcelino, Subic |
| 5 | | Jay Khonghun | June 30, 2022 | Incumbent | 20th | Lakas (SZP) | Re-elected in 2025. | 1987–present Castillejos, Olongapo, San Marcelino, Subic |

== Election results ==
=== 2025 ===
| Candidate | Party | Votes | % |
|---|---|---|---|
| Jay Khonghun (incumbent) | Lakas–CMD | 160,887 | 100.00 |
| Total | | 160,887 | 100.00 |
| Valid votes | | 160,887 | 80.79 |
| Invalid/blank votes | | 38,250 | 19.21 |
| Total votes | | 199,137 | 100.00 |
| Registered voters/turnout | | 253,317 | 78.61 |
| Lakas–CMD hold | | | |
Source: Commission on Elections

=== 2022 ===
2022 Philippine House of Representatives elections
| Party | Candidate | Votes | % |
|---|---|---|---|
| Nacionalista | Jefferson Khonghun | 156,561 | 79.54 |
| PDP–Laban | Mitos Magsaysay | 40,262 | 20.46 |
| Total votes | | 196,823 | 100.00 |
| Nacionalista hold | | | |

=== 2019 ===
2019 Philippine House of Representatives elections
| Party | Candidate | Votes | % |
|---|---|---|---|
| Nacionalista | Jeffrey Khonghun | 115,172 | 70.37 |
| PFP | Mitos Magsaysay | 47,125 | 28.79 |
| Independent | Allan Avila | 1,360 | 0.83 |
| Total votes | | 163,557 | 100.00 |
| Nacionalista hold | | | |

=== 2016 ===
2016 Philippine House of Representatives elections
| Party | Candidate | Votes | % |
|---|---|---|---|
| Liberal | Jeffrey Khonghun | 146,293 | 92.54 |
| PDP–Laban | Michael Macapagal | 11,799 | 7.46 |
| Total votes | | 158,092 | 100.00 |
| Liberal hold | | | |

=== 2013 ===
2013 Philippine House of Representatives elections
| Party | Candidate | Votes | % |
|---|---|---|---|
| NPC | Jeffrey Khonghun | 45,434 | 57.74 |
| Liberal | James Gordon Jr. | 22,068 | 28.04 |
| UNA | Jobo Magsaysay | 11,189 | 14.22 |
| Total votes | | 78,691 | 100.00 |
| NPC gain from Lakas | | | |

=== 2010 ===
2010 Philippine House of Representatives elections
| Party | Candidate | Votes | % |
|---|---|---|---|
| Lakas | Mitos Magsaysay | 89,754 | 61.41 |
| Bagumbayan | Anne Marie Gordon | 56,412 | 38.59 |
| Total votes | | 146,166 | 100.00 |
| Lakas hold | | | |

== See also ==
- Legislative districts of Zambales
