= Jay Khonghun =

Filipino politician (born 1977)

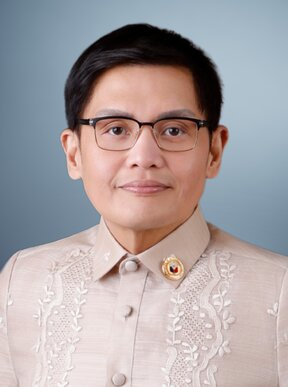
- Official portrait, 2025

Deputy Speaker of the House of Representatives of the Philippines
- Incumbent
- Assumed office July 28, 2025 Serving with several others
- House Speaker: Martin Romualdez; Faustino "Bojie" Dy III

Member of the Philippine House of Representatives from Zambales' 1st district
- Incumbent
- Assumed office June 30, 2022
- Preceded by: Jeffrey Khonghun

Vice Governor of Zambales
- In office June 30, 2019 – June 30, 2022
- Governor: Hermogenes Ebdane, Jr.
- Preceded by: Angel Magsaysay Cheng
- Succeeded by: Jacqueline Khonghun

Mayor of Subic, Zambales
- In office June 30, 2010 – June 30, 2019
- Vice Mayor: Leonardo Guevara Jr. (2010–2013); Lauro Simbol (2013–2016); JB Felarca (2016–2019)
- Preceded by: Jeffrey D. Khonghun
- Succeeded by: Jonathan John F. Khonghun

Member of the Zambales Provincial Board from the 1st district
- In office June 30, 2004 – June 30, 2010

Personal details
- Born: Jefferson Ferrer Khonghun; June 26, 1977 (age 49) Olongapo, Zambales, Philippines
- Party: Lakas (until 2009; 2022–present); SZP (local party; 2012–present)
- Other political affiliations: Nacionalista (2021–2022); PDP-Laban (2018–2021); Liberal (2009–2012; 2015–2018)
- Spouse: Eloisa Lopez Recella (annulled)
- Children: 1
- Education: Mapúa Institute of Technology (BS)
- Occupation: Civil engineer, politician

Jefferson "Jay" Ferrer Khonghun (born June 26, 1977) is a Filipino politician and civil engineer serving as the representative of the 1st District of Zambales since 2022. He previously served as vice governor of Zambales from 2019 to 2022 and as mayor of Subic, Zambales for three consecutive terms from 2010 to 2019.

== Early life and education ==
Khonghun was born on June 26, 1977, in Olongapo, Zambales. He graduated from the Mapúa Institute of Technology (now Mapúa University) in 2000 where he obtained a civil engineering degree.

== Political career ==
Khonghun began his political career as a member of the Sangguniang Panlalawigan of Zambales, serving two consecutive terms in the provincial legislature from July 2004 to June 2010.

In 2010, he was elected mayor of Subic, Zambales, a position he held for three consecutive terms until 2019.

Running for the position of vice governor of Zambales for the 2019 election, Khonghun noted rumors of his family being involved in the illegal drug trade is being spread. He alleged this comes from his political rivals. As anticipated by Khonghun, his and his father's name was among those included in President Rodrigo Duterte's "narco-list"; a list of personalities alleged to be involved in the illegal drug trade. Duterte is waging a deadly national war on drugs at the time. The Khonghuns denied links to illegal drugs. His girlfriend and actress, Aiko Melendez also defended Khonghun questioning the timing of the allegations.

Despite this, Khonghun was elected vice governor of Zambales ganering more votes than incumbent Angel Magsaysay-Cheng. He served under the provincial government until 2022.

In the 2022 election ran for the position in the House of Representatives as the legislator for Zambales's 1st district. He ran under the Nacionalista Party and claimed that he have received endorsement from President Duterte himself despite his earlier inclusion in the narco-list.

He won and assumed office on June 30, 2022. He emerged as part of the "Young Guns" bloc during the 19th Congress making critical statement on former president Rodrigo Duterte and Vice President Sara Duterte. The bloc is aligned to House Speaker Martin Romualdez and President Bongbong Marcos' administration. He ran in the 2025 election under Lakas–CMD.

== Personal life ==
Jay Khonghun is part of a political family with his father, brother, and sister having contested in local elections in Zambales. His brother Jonathan has served as mayor of the town of Subic.

He was married to Eloisa Lopez Recella with whom he had a son. In October 2017, Khonghun started a romantic relationship with actress Aiko Melendez. Melendez said that Khonghun had already annulled his marriage with Recella. Khonghun and Melendez broke up in 2025. In January 2026, Khonghun was reported to be romantically linked to Manila Vice Mayor Chi Atienza.

Prior to starting his political career, Khonghun was manager of NDK Builders Aningway.

== Electoral history ==
Electoral history of Jay Khonghun
Year	Office	Party		Votes received				Result
Year	Office	Local	National	Total	%	P.	Swing	Result
2004	Board Member (Zambales–1st)	—N/a	Lakas	—N/a	—N/a	1st	—N/a	Won
2007	Board Member (Zambales–1st)	—N/a	Lakas	40,015	—N/a	1st	—N/a	Won
2010	Mayor of Subic, Zambales	—N/a	Liberal	22,083	—N/a	1st	—N/a	Won
2013	Mayor of Subic, Zambales	SZP	—N/a	23,871	92.13%	1st	—N/a	Won
2016	Mayor of Subic, Zambales	SZP	Liberal	36,649	—N/a	1st	—N/a	Won
2019	Vice Governor of Zambales	SZP	PDP–Laban	115,172	70.37%	1st	—N/a	Won
2022	Representative (Zambales–1st)	SZP	Nacionalista	156,561	79.54%	1st	—N/a	Won
2025	Representative (Zambales–1st)	SZP	Lakas	160,887	100.00%	1st	—N/a	Unopposed
