= Mayor of Iba, Zambales =

Local chief executive of Iba, Zambales

Mayor of Municipality of Iba, Zambales
- Incumbent; Irenea Maniquiz since 1 July 2022
- Style: The Honourable
- Residence: None
- Appointer: Elected via popular vote
- Term length: 3 years, not eligible for re-election immediately after three consecutive terms
- Inaugural holder: Juan Gonzales (1912)
- Formation: 1912

The mayor of Iba, Zambales (Filipino: Punong Lungsod ng Iba) is the head of the executive branch of Iba, Zambales's government. The mayor holds office at Iba Municipal Hall. Like all local government heads in the Philippines, the mayor is elected via popular vote, and may not be elected for a fourth consecutive term (although the former mayor may return to office after an interval of one term). In case of death, resignation or incapacity, the vice mayor becomes the mayor.

== List ==
=== (1912–Present) ===
№	Portrait	Name (Born–Died)	Term of office			Political Party	Term	Elected	Ref
№	Portrait	Name (Born–Died)	Took office	Left office	Duration	Political Party	Term	Elected	Ref
1		Juan Gonzales	1912						
2		Miguel Cuevas							
18		Oscar Gonzales	1968	1971	Unknown	Unknown	1	1968	
19		Nestor Trinidad died: 1989	1986	April 1989	Unknown	Unknown	1	1986	
20		Pancho Reyes Huang (born:1955 - died:2015) (60)	April 7, 1989	June 30, 2001	12 years, 84 days	Lakas–CMD	3	1992; 1995; 1998	
21		Danilo Pamoleras	July 1, 2001	June 30, 2010	8 years, 364 days	Liberal Party	3	2001; 2004; 2007	
22		Ad Hebert Deloso	July 1, 2010	June 30, 2013	2 years, 364 days	Liberal Party	1	2010	
23		Jun Rundstedt Ebdane; December 30, 1972 (age 53)	July 1, 2013	June 30, 2022	13 years, 68 days	Sulong Zambales Party	3	2013; 2016; 2019	
24		Irenea Maniquiz	July 1, 2022	Present	1 year, 68 days	Sulong Zambales Party	1		
