= 2025 Philippine local elections in Central Luzon =

- May 12, 2025
- Gubernatorial elections
- 7 provincial governors and 2 city mayors
Party	Seats	+/–
Kambilan	1	0
Lakas	1	New
LDP	1	+1
Nacionalista	1	0
NUP	1	0
PFP	1	+1
SST	1	New
SZP	1	0
Sigaw	1	0
This lists parties that won seats. See the complete results below.
- Vice gubernatorial elections
- 7 provincial vice governors and 2 city vice mayors
Party	Seats	+/–
NPC	2	+1
Aksyon	1	0
Lakas	1	New
LDP	1	+1
NUP	1	−1
PFP	1	+1
PRP	1	New
Sigaw	1	0
This lists parties that won seats. See the complete results below.
- Provincial Board elections
- 74 provincial board members and 20 city councilors
Party	Seats	+/–
Lakas	16	+13
PFP	13	+12
NUP	12	+3
SZP	9	+1
NPC	8	−5
Kambilan	7	−4
LDP	6	+2
Nacionalista	6	−5
Sigaw	6	−1
AR	1	New
PRP	1	+1
Independent	9	+7
This lists parties that won seats. See the complete results below.

The 2025 Philippine local elections in Central Luzon was held on May 12, 2025.

== Summary ==
=== Governors ===
Province/city	Incumbent	Incumbent's party	Winner	Winner's party	Winning margin
Angeles City (HUC)	Carmelo Lazatin Jr.	PFP	Carmelo Lazatin II	Lakas	24.96%
Aurora	Christian Noveras	PFP	Reynante Tolentino	LDP	11.50%
Bataan	Joet Garcia	PFP	Joet Garcia	PFP	77.40%
Bulacan	Daniel Fernando	NUP	Daniel Fernando	NUP	56.39%
Nueva Ecija	Aurelio Umali	Unang Sigaw	Aurelio Umali	Unang Sigaw	62.24%
Olongapo (HUC)	Rolen Paulino Jr.	Nacionalista	Rolen Paulino Jr.	Nacionalista	12.76%
Pampanga	Dennis Pineda	NPC	Lilia Pineda	Kambilan	19.53%
Tarlac	Susan Yap	NPC	Christian Yap	Sama Sama Tarlac	29.79%
Zambales	Hermogenes Ebdane	SZP	Hermogenes Ebdane	SZP	81.70%

=== Vice governors ===
Province/city	Incumbent	Incumbent's party	Winner	Winner's party	Winning margin
Angeles City (HUC)	Vicky Vega	Lakas	Amos Rivera	PRP	4.96%
Aurora	Jennifer Araña	PFP	Sid Galban	LDP	0.86%
Bataan	Cris Garcia	PFP	Cris Garcia	PFP	74.66%
Bulacan	Alex Castro	NUP	Alex Castro	NUP	75.08%
Nueva Ecija	Anthony Umali	Unang Sigaw	Lemon Umali	Unang Sigaw	42.04%
Olongapo (HUC)	Jong Cortez	Independent	Kaye Ann Legaspi	Aksyon	22.47%
Pampanga	Lilia Pineda	Kambilan	Dennis Pineda	NPC	31.98%
Tarlac	Casada David	NPC	Lita Aquino	NPC	7.74%
Zambales	Jaq Khonghun	Lakas	Jaq Khonghun	Lakas	Unopposed

=== Provincial boards ===
Province/city	Seats	Party control		Composition
Province/city	Seats	Previous	Result	Composition
Angeles City (HUC)	10 elected 2 ex-officio	Kambilan	Lakas	Lakas (8); Independent (2)
Aurora	10 elected 4 ex-officio	No majority	No majority	LDP (6); PFP (2); Nacionalista (1); Independent (1)
Bataan	10 elected 4 ex-officio	No majority	No majority	PFP (5); NUP (3); Nacionalista (2)
Bulacan	14 elected 4 ex-officio	No majority	No majority	NUP (8); PFP (2); Lakas (2); Arangkada San Joseño (1); Independent (1)
Nueva Ecija	10 elected 4 ex-officio	No majority	No majority	Unang Sigaw (6); PFP (2); Lakas (1); NUP (1)
Olongapo (HUC)	10 elected 2 ex-officio	No majority	No majority	Nacionalista (3); Lakas (3); PFP (1); PRP (1); Independent (2)
Pampanga	10 elected 3 ex-officio	No majority	Kambilan	Kambilan (7); Lakas (2); Independent (1)
Tarlac	10 elected 3 ex-officio	NPC	NPC	NPC (7); PFP (1); Independent (2)
Zambales	10 elected 4 ex-officio	SZP	SZP	SZP (9); NPC (1)

== Angeles City ==
=== Mayor ===
Incumbent Mayor Carmelo Lazatin Jr. of the Partido Federal ng Pilipinas ran for the House of Representatives in Pampanga's 1st legislative district. He was previously affiliated with Kambilan.

Lazatin endorsed his half-brother, representative Carmelo Lazatin II (Lakas–CMD), who won against former Philippine National Police chief Oscar Albayalde (People's Reform Party).

Candidate	Party	Votes	%
Carmelo Lazatin II	Lakas–CMD	98,164	62.48
Oscar Albayalde	People's Reform Party	58,953	37.52
Total		157,117	100.00
Valid votes		157,117	93.39
Invalid/blank votes		11,125	6.61
Total votes		168,242	100.00
Registered voters/turnout		211,775	79.44
Lakas gain from PFP			
Source: Commission on Elections

=== Vice Mayor ===
Incumbent Vice Mayor Vicky Vega of Lakas–CMD ran for a third term. She was previously affiliated with Kambilan.

Vega was defeated by former city councilor Amos Rivera of the People's Reform Party.

Candidate	Party	Votes	%
Amos Rivera	People's Reform Party	79,866	52.48
Vicky Vega (incumbent)	Lakas–CMD	72,315	47.52
Total		152,181	100.00
Valid votes		152,181	90.45
Invalid/blank votes		16,061	9.55
Total votes		168,242	100.00
Registered voters/turnout		211,775	79.44
PRP gain from Lakas			
Source: Commission on Elections

=== City Council ===
The Angeles City Council is composed of 12 councilors, 10 of whom are elected.

27 candidates were included in the ballot.

Lakas–CMD won eight seats, gaining a majority in the city council.

Party	Votes	%	Seats	+/–
Lakas–CMD	652,033	57.57	8	New
People's Reform Party	209,213	18.47	0	New
Nationalist People's Coalition	35,140	3.10	0	New
Independent	236,140	20.85	2	+2
Total	1,132,526	100.00	10	0
Total votes	168,242	–		
Registered voters/turnout	211,775	79.44		
Source: Commission on Elections

Candidate	Party	Votes	%
Pogs Suller (incumbent)	Lakas–CMD	91,793	8.11
JC Parker Aguas (incumbent)	Lakas–CMD	79,661	7.03
Niknok Bañola (incumbent)	Lakas–CMD	70,983	6.27
Maricel Morales	Independent	69,853	6.17
Edu Pamintuan (incumbent)	Lakas–CMD	68,952	6.09
Ron Pineda	Lakas–CMD	67,618	5.97
Alex Indiongco (incumbent)	Lakas–CMD	65,171	5.75
Mich Bonifacio	Lakas–CMD	58,157	5.14
Jeselle Dayrit	Independent	55,142	4.87
Raco del Rosario (incumbent)	Lakas–CMD	52,497	4.64
Jan Sangil	Independent	51,735	4.57
Alfred Sangil	Lakas–CMD	51,604	4.56
Chris Cortez (incumbent)	Lakas–CMD	45,597	4.03
Aljur Abrenica	People's Reform Party	42,017	3.71
Philip Cesar Samson	Independent	37,477	3.31
Tony Mamac	Nationalist People's Coalition	35,140	3.10
Pie Juan	People's Reform Party	34,758	3.07
Patrick Cura	People's Reform Party	30,341	2.68
Lab Nacu	People's Reform Party	26,336	2.33
Don Quito	People's Reform Party	22,595	2.00
Cris Cadiang	People's Reform Party	20,358	1.80
Rhoda Timaio	People's Reform Party	18,770	1.66
Nong Tamayo	People's Reform Party	14,038	1.24
Severino Madlangbayan Jr.	Independent	6,468	0.57
Marvin Tropa	Independent	6,028	0.53
Angel Munar	Independent	4,827	0.43
Cheng Bangayan	Independent	4,610	0.41
Total		1,132,526	100.00
Total votes		168,242	–
Registered voters/turnout		211,775	79.44
Source: Commission on Elections

== Aurora ==
=== Governor ===
Incumbent Governor Christian Noveras of the Partido Federal ng Pilipinas ran for a full term. He was previously affiliated with PDP–Laban.

Elected in 2022, Noveras was dismissed by the Office of the Ombudsman on December 13, 2023, over the use of government resources for his campaign. The Court of Appeals overturned Noveras' dismissal on October 10, 2024.

Noveras was defeated by Reynante Tolentino of Laban ng Demokratikong Pilipino, who was the governor during his dismissal.

Candidate	Party	Votes	%
Reynante Tolentino	Laban ng Demokratikong Pilipino	67,827	55.75
Christian Noveras (incumbent)	Partido Federal ng Pilipinas	53,829	44.25
Total		121,656	100.00
Valid votes		121,656	94.31
Invalid/blank votes		7,337	5.69
Total votes		128,993	100.00
Registered voters/turnout		157,240	82.04
LDP gain from PFP			
Source: Commission on Elections

=== Vice Governor ===
Incumbent Vice Governor Jennifer Araña of the Partido Federal ng Pilipinas ran for the Aurora Provincial Board in the 2nd provincial district. She became vice governor on April 24, 2024, after Reynante Tolentino became governor following Christian Noveras' dismissal.

The Partido Federal ng Pilipinas nominated Tin Tin Noveras, who was defeated by provincial board member Sid Galban of Laban ng Demokratikong Pilipino.

Candidate	Party	Votes	%
Sid Galban	Laban ng Demokratikong Pilipino	58,962	50.43
Tin Tin Noveras	Partido Federal ng Pilipinas	57,960	49.57
Total		116,922	100.00
Valid votes		116,922	90.64
Invalid/blank votes		12,071	9.36
Total votes		128,993	100.00
Registered voters/turnout		157,240	82.04
LDP gain from PFP			
Source: Commission on Elections

=== Provincial Board ===
Since Aurora's reclassification as a 2nd class province in 2025, the Aurora Provincial Board is composed of 14 board members, 10 of whom are elected.

Laban ng Demokratikong Pilipino won six seats, remaining as the largest party in the provincial board.

Party	Votes	%	Seats	+/–
Laban ng Demokratikong Pilipino	238,271	62.96	6	+2
Partido Federal ng Pilipinas	91,528	24.18	2	New
Nacionalista Party	30,952	8.18	1	0
Independent	17,720	4.68	1	+1
Total	378,471	100.00	10	+2
Total votes	128,993	–		
Registered voters/turnout	157,240	82.04		
Source: Commission on Elections

==== 1st district ====
Aurora's 1st provincial district consists of the municipalities of Baler, Dingalan, Maria Aurora and San Luis. Six board members are elected from this provincial district.

Seven candidates were included in the ballot.

Candidate	Party	Votes	%
Patrick Angara	Laban ng Demokratikong Pilipino	47,737	20.38
Bobong Ong	Laban ng Demokratikong Pilipino	43,972	18.77
Jake Galban (incumbent)	Laban ng Demokratikong Pilipino	40,986	17.50
Norma Palmero	Laban ng Demokratikong Pilipino	36,397	15.54
Nano Tangson	Nacionalista Party	30,952	13.21
Sherwin Amatorio	Partido Federal ng Pilipinas	22,769	9.72
Gliceria Geneta	Partido Federal ng Pilipinas	11,454	4.89
Total		234,267	100.00
Total votes		79,482	–
Registered voters/turnout		97,155	81.81
Source: Commission on Elections

==== 2nd district ====
Aurora's 2nd provincial district consists of the municipalities of Casiguran, Dilasag, Dinalungan and Dipaculao. Four board members are elected from this provincial district.

Nine candidates were included in the ballot.

Candidate	Party	Votes	%
Yam Tolentino	Laban ng Demokratikong Pilipino	23,584	16.35
Menard Amansec	Laban ng Demokratikong Pilipino	20,703	14.36
Jennifer Araña	Partido Federal ng Pilipinas	20,692	14.35
Ena Tablang	Independent	17,720	12.29
Totoy Noveras Jr.	Partido Federal ng Pilipinas	13,219	9.17
Lito Pascua (incumbent)	Laban ng Demokratikong Pilipino	12,715	8.82
Percy Salamera	Partido Federal ng Pilipinas	12,600	8.74
Tho Miran	Laban ng Demokratikong Pilipino	12,177	8.44
Joseph Molina	Partido Federal ng Pilipinas	10,794	7.49
Total		144,204	100.00
Total votes		49,511	–
Registered voters/turnout		60,085	82.40
Source: Commission on Elections

== Bataan ==
=== Governor ===
Incumbent Governor Joet Garcia of the Partido Federal ng Pilipinas ran for a second term. He was previously affiliated with PDP–Laban.

Garcia won re-election against former Pilar mayor Estrella Santos (Independent).

Candidate	Party	Votes	%
Joet Garcia (incumbent)	Partido Federal ng Pilipinas	388,011	88.70
Estrella Santos	Independent	49,428	11.30
Total		437,439	100.00
Valid votes		437,439	88.30
Invalid/blank votes		57,974	11.70
Total votes		495,413	100.00
Registered voters/turnout		586,044	84.54
PFP hold			
Source: Commission on Elections

=== Vice Governor ===
Incumbent Vice Governor Cris Garcia of the Partido Federal ng Pilipinas ran for a third term. She was previously affiliated with the National Unity Party.

Garcia won re-election against JV Coronel (Independent).

Candidate	Party	Votes	%
Cris Garcia (incumbent)	Partido Federal ng Pilipinas	350,668	87.33
JV Coronel	Independent	50,870	12.67
Total		401,538	100.00
Valid votes		401,538	81.05
Invalid/blank votes		93,875	18.95
Total votes		495,413	100.00
Registered voters/turnout		586,044	84.54
PFP hold			
Source: Commission on Elections

=== Provincial Board ===
The Bataan Provincial Board is composed of 14 board members, 10 of whom are elected.

The Partido Federal ng Pilipinas won five seats, becoming the largest party in the provincial board.

Party	Votes	%	Seats	+/–
Partido Federal ng Pilipinas	455,825	47.12	5	New
National Unity Party	298,816	30.89	3	0
Nacionalista Party	170,664	17.64	2	–1
Katipunan ng Nagkakaisang Pilipino	42,040	4.35	0	New
Total	967,345	100.00	10	0
Total votes	495,413	–		
Registered voters/turnout	586,044	84.54		
Source: Commission on Elections

==== 1st district ====
Bataan's 1st provincial district consists of the same area as Bataan's 1st legislative district. Three board members are elected from this provincial district.

Four candidates were included in the ballot.

Candidate	Party	Votes	%
Jomar Gaza (incumbent)	Partido Federal ng Pilipinas	77,731	30.22
Mylene Serrano	Nacionalista Party	71,378	27.75
Bong Galicia	Partido Federal ng Pilipinas	66,106	25.70
Maya Bongco	Katipunan ng Nagkakaisang Pilipino	42,040	16.34
Total		257,255	100.00
Total votes		136,410	–
Registered voters/turnout		163,095	83.64
Source: Commission on Elections

==== 2nd district ====
Bataan's 2nd provincial district consists of the same area as Bataan's 2nd legislative district. Three board members are elected from this provincial district.

Three candidates were included in the ballot.

Candidate	Party	Votes	%
Iya Roque (incumbent)	National Unity Party	116,405	36.47
Noel Valdecañas (incumbent)	Partido Federal ng Pilipinas	101,538	31.81
Vic Baluyot	Partido Federal ng Pilipinas	101,279	31.73
Total		319,222	100.00
Total votes		173,176	–
Registered voters/turnout		199,306	86.89
Source: Commission on Elections

==== 3rd district ====
Bataan's 3rd provincial district consists of the same area as Bataan's 3rd legislative district. Four board members are elected from this provincial district.

Four candidates were included in the ballot.

Candidate	Party	Votes	%
Popoy del Rosario (incumbent)	Partido Federal ng Pilipinas	109,171	27.93
Angel Sunga (incumbent)	Nacionalista Party	99,286	25.40
Jorge Estanislao (incumbent)	National Unity Party	96,947	24.80
Harold Espeleta (incumbent)	National Unity Party	85,464	21.87
Total		390,868	100.00
Total votes		185,827	–
Registered voters/turnout		223,643	83.09
Source: Commission on Elections

== Bulacan ==
=== Governor ===
Incumbent Governor Daniel Fernando of the National Unity Party ran for a third term.

Fernando won re-election against former Bulacan governor Wilhelmino Sy-Alvarado (Partido para sa Demokratikong Reporma), former Meycauayan Vice-Mayor Salvador Violago (Partido Federal ng Pilipinas) and three other candidates.

Candidate	Party	Votes	%
Daniel Fernando (incumbent)	National Unity Party	1,177,893	69.86
Wilhelmino Sy-Alvarado	Partido para sa Demokratikong Reporma	227,194	13.47
Salvador Violago	Partido Federal ng Pilipinas	226,204	13.42
Melissa Aquino	Independent	28,521	1.69
Jay Ocampo	Independent	13,685	0.81
Climate de Guzman	Independent	12,681	0.75
Total		1,686,178	100.00
Valid votes		1,686,178	91.25
Invalid/blank votes		161,638	8.75
Total votes		1,847,816	100.00
Registered voters/turnout		2,173,026	85.03
NUP hold			
Source: Commission on Elections

=== Vice Governor ===
Incumbent Vice Governor Alex Castro of the National Unity Party ran for a second term.

Castro won re-election against former Meycauayan councilor Elmer Paguio (Partido Federal ng Pilipinas) and three other candidates.

Candidate	Party	Votes	%
Alex Castro (incumbent)	National Unity Party	1,360,020	84.71
Elmer Paguio	Partido Federal ng Pilipinas	154,644	9.63
Allan Villena	Independent	53,389	3.33
Efren Milanes	Independent	22,521	1.40
Marlon Tomagan	Independent	14,936	0.93
Total		1,605,510	100.00
Valid votes		1,605,510	86.89
Invalid/blank votes		242,306	13.11
Total votes		1,847,816	100.00
Registered voters/turnout		2,173,026	85.03
NUP hold			
Source: Commission on Elections

=== Provincial Board ===
Since a Supreme Court ruling in 2023 on provincial board representation for component cities having their own legislative districts, the Bulacan Provincial Board is composed of 18 board members, 14 of whom are elected.

The National Unity Party won eight seats, becoming the largest party in the provincial board.

Party	Votes	%	Seats	+/–
National Unity Party	1,217,038	46.38	8	+2
Partido Federal ng Pilipinas	713,648	27.19	2	+2
Lakas–CMD	283,307	10.80	2	+2
Arangkada San Joseño	119,693	4.56	1	New
Nationalist People's Coalition	52,766	2.01	0	New
Bunyog Party	4,085	0.16	0	New
Independent	233,665	8.90	1	+1
Total	2,624,202	100.00	14	+2
Total votes	1,847,816	–		
Registered voters/turnout	2,173,026	85.03		
Source: Commission on Elections

==== 1st district ====
Bulacan's 1st provincial district consists of the same area as Bulacan's 1st legislative district. Two board members are elected from this provincial district.

Eight candidates were included in the ballot.

Candidate	Party	Votes	%
Michael Aquino	National Unity Party	126,653	22.81
Mina Fermin (incumbent)	Independent	122,271	22.02
Ayee Ople	Partido Federal ng Pilipinas	102,696	18.50
Niño Bautista	Partido Federal ng Pilipinas	93,403	16.82
Noel Sacay	Nationalist People's Coalition	52,766	9.50
James Santos	National Unity Party	43,573	7.85
Bong Laderas	Independent	8,530	1.54
Ryan Abueg	Independent	5,301	0.95
Total		555,193	100.00
Total votes		381,907	–
Registered voters/turnout		449,028	85.05
Source: Commission on Elections

==== 2nd district ====
Bulacan's 2nd provincial district consists of the same area as Bulacan's 2nd legislative district. Two board members are elected from this provincial district.

Five candidates were included in the ballot.

Candidate	Party	Votes	%
Pechay dela Cruz (incumbent)	National Unity Party	99,290	35.61
Dingdong Nicolas (incumbent)	National Unity Party	84,464	30.29
Charm Clemente	Partido Federal ng Pilipinas	62,829	22.53
Glenn Vistan	Partido Federal ng Pilipinas	25,583	9.17
Vino Andal	Independent	6,697	2.40
Total		278,863	100.00
Total votes		199,469	–
Registered voters/turnout		236,272	84.42
Source: Commission on Elections

==== 3rd district ====
Bulacan's 3rd provincial district consists of the same area as Bulacan's 3rd legislative district. Two board members are elected from this provincial district.

Five candidates were included in the ballot.

Candidate	Party	Votes	%
Aye Mariano (incumbent)	National Unity Party	120,479	34.47
RC Nono Castro (incumbent)	National Unity Party	115,088	32.92
Emily Viceo	Lakas–CMD	73,726	21.09
John Mendez	Partido Federal ng Pilipinas	36,651	10.48
Dolfo Delfin	Independent	3,616	1.03
Total		349,560	100.00
Total votes		253,869	–
Registered voters/turnout		286,844	88.50
Source: Commission on Elections

==== 4th district ====
Bulacan's 4th provincial district consists of the same area as Bulacan's 4th legislative district. The city of San Jose del Monte used to be under this provincial district until a Supreme Court ruling in 2023 created a separate provincial district for the city. Two board members are elected from this provincial district.

Five candidates were included in the ballot.

Candidate	Party	Votes	%
Kat Hernandez	Partido Federal ng Pilipinas	123,412	34.55
William Villarica	Partido Federal ng Pilipinas	109,775	30.73
Babes San Andres	National Unity Party	53,063	14.86
Jojo Manzano	National Unity Party	52,995	14.84
Lito Alcaraz	Independent	17,945	5.02
Total		357,190	100.00
Total votes		246,291	–
Registered voters/turnout		287,554	85.65
Source: Commission on Elections

==== 5th district ====
Bulacan's 5th provincial district consists of the same area as Bulacan's 5th legislative district. Two board members are elected from this provincial district.

Four candidates were included in the ballot.

Candidate	Party	Votes	%
Ricky Roque (incumbent)	National Unity Party	139,505	41.98
Teta Mendoza (incumbent)	National Unity Party	134,412	40.45
Neil Tuazon	Partido Federal ng Pilipinas	34,072	10.25
Ruben Hipolito	Independent	24,286	7.31
Total		332,275	100.00
Total votes		267,271	–
Registered voters/turnout		317,655	84.14
Source: Commission on Elections

==== 6th district ====
Bulacan's 6th provincial district consists of the same area as Bulacan's 6th legislative district. Two board members are elected from this provincial district.

Six candidates were included in the ballot.

Candidate	Party	Votes	%
Jay de Guzman (incumbent)	Lakas–CMD	112,752	32.02
Art Legaspi (incumbent)	Lakas–CMD	96,829	27.50
Marisa Tuazon	Partido Federal ng Pilipinas	83,655	23.76
Mary Jane Garcia	Partido Federal ng Pilipinas	24,141	6.86
Lino Lopez	Independent	18,398	5.22
Angel Barcial	Independent	16,354	4.64
Total		352,129	100.00
Total votes		242,954	–
Registered voters/turnout		285,359	85.14
Source: Commission on Elections

==== San Jose del Monte ====
Following a Supreme Court ruling in 2023, a provincial district was created for the city of San Jose del Monte, which used to be under Bulacan's 4th provincial district. Two board members are elected from this provincial district.

Six candidates were included in the ballot.

Candidate	Party	Votes	%
Jon-jon delos Santos (incumbent)	National Unity Party	150,327	37.68
Efren Bartolome Jr.	Arangkada San Joseño	119,693	30.00
Allen Baluyut (incumbent)	National Unity Party	97,189	24.36
Owesa Joy Osea	Partido Federal ng Pilipinas	17,431	4.37
Luis Bastaliño	Independent	10,267	2.57
Culex Soliman	Bunyog Party	4,085	1.02
Total		398,992	100.00
Total votes		256,055	–
Registered voters/turnout		310,314	82.51
Source: Commission on Elections

== Nueva Ecija ==
=== Governor ===
Incumbent Governor Aurelio Umali of Unang Sigaw ran for a third term.

Umali won re-election against former General Tinio mayor Virgilio Bote (Partido Federal ng Pilipinas).

Candidate	Party	Votes	%
Aurelio Umali (incumbent)	Unang Sigaw	983,805	81.12
Virgilio Bote	Partido Federal ng Pilipinas	229,041	18.88
Total		1,212,846	100.00
Valid votes		1,212,846	89.84
Invalid/blank votes		137,104	10.16
Total votes		1,349,950	100.00
Registered voters/turnout		1,620,166	83.32
Unang Sigaw hold			
Source: Commission on Elections

=== Vice Governor ===
Incumbent Vice Governor Anthony Umali of Unang Sigaw ran for mayor of Cabanatuan.

Unang Sigaw nominated Lemon Umali, who won the election against former Nueva Ecija vice governor Edward Thomas Joson (Partido Federal ng Pilipinas).

Candidate	Party	Votes	%
Lemon Umali	Unang Sigaw	812,198	71.02
Edward Thomas Joson	Partido Federal ng Pilipinas	331,481	28.98
Total		1,143,679	100.00
Valid votes		1,143,679	84.72
Invalid/blank votes		206,271	15.28
Total votes		1,349,950	100.00
Registered voters/turnout		1,620,166	83.32
Unang Sigaw hold			
Source: Commission on Elections

=== Provincial Board ===
The Nueva Ecija Provincial Board is composed of 14 board members, 10 of whom are elected.

Unang Sigaw won six seats, remaining as the largest party in the provincial board.

Party	Votes	%	Seats	+/–
Unang Sigaw	1,096,199	52.26	6	–1
Partido Federal ng Pilipinas	518,406	24.71	2	New
Lakas–CMD	170,085	8.11	1	New
Pwersa ng Masang Pilipino	110,201	5.25	0	New
National Unity Party	103,627	4.94	1	New
Independent	99,153	4.73	0	0
Total	2,097,671	100.00	10	0
Total votes	1,349,950	–		
Registered voters/turnout	1,620,166	83.32		
Source: Commission on Elections

==== 1st district ====
Nueva Ecija's 1st provincial district consists of the same area as Nueva Ecija's 1st legislative district. Three board members are elected from this provincial district.

Five candidates were included in the ballot.

Candidate	Party	Votes	%
Baby Palilio	Unang Sigaw	157,840	30.42
Rai-Rai Villanueva	Unang Sigaw	143,163	27.60
Eric Salazar (incumbent)	Unang Sigaw	134,944	26.01
Felix Diosdado Lumang	Partido Federal ng Pilipinas	48,505	9.35
Rodel Cabuyaban	Independent	34,339	6.62
Total		518,791	100.00
Total votes		325,530	–
Registered voters/turnout		400,221	81.34
Source: Commission on Elections

==== 2nd district ====
Nueva Ecija's 2nd provincial district consists of the same area as Nueva Ecija's 2nd legislative district. Two board members are elected from this provincial district.

Four candidates were included in the ballot.

Candidate	Party	Votes	%
Dindo Dysico (incumbent)	Unang Sigaw	131,861	35.52
Jason Abalos (incumbent)	National Unity Party	103,627	27.91
Hermie Salcedo	Partido Federal ng Pilipinas	78,275	21.09
Wowowee Ortiz	Independent	57,466	15.48
Total		371,229	100.00
Total votes		276,585	–
Registered voters/turnout		329,147	84.03
Source: Commission on Elections

==== 3rd district ====
Nueva Ecija's 3rd provincial district consists of the same area as Nueva Ecija's 3rd legislative district. Two board members are elected from this provincial district.

Four candidates were included in the ballot.

Candidate	Party	Votes	%
EJ Joson (incumbent)	Partido Federal ng Pilipinas	193,090	37.60
PB Garcia	Partido Federal ng Pilipinas	172,949	33.68
Jay Ilagan	Unang Sigaw	140,086	27.28
Gilbert Mojica	Independent	7,348	1.43
Total		513,473	100.00
Total votes		388,875	–
Registered voters/turnout		466,379	83.38
Source: Commission on Elections

==== 4th district ====
Nueva Ecija's 4th provincial district consists of the same area as Nueva Ecija's 4th legislative district. Three board members are elected from this provincial district.

Six candidates were included in the ballot.

Candidate	Party	Votes	%
Dodong Bautista	Lakas–CMD	170,085	24.50
Jon-jon Padiernos	Unang Sigaw	157,121	22.63
Sweet Cruz (incumbent)	Unang Sigaw	125,530	18.08
Julie Maxwell	Pwersa ng Masang Pilipino	110,201	15.88
Tess Patiag (incumbent)	Unang Sigaw	105,654	15.22
Mary Grace Factor	Partido Federal ng Pilipinas	25,587	3.69
Total		694,178	100.00
Total votes		358,960	–
Registered voters/turnout		424,419	84.58
Source: Commission on Elections

== Olongapo ==
=== Mayor ===
Incumbent Mayor Rolen Paulino Jr. of the Nacionalista Party ran for a third term.

Paulino won re-election against Olongapo vice mayor Jong Cortez (Independent), Olongapo Liga ng mga Barangay president Echie Ponge (Partido Federal ng Pilipinas) and talent manager Arnold Vegafria (PDP–Laban).

Candidate	Party	Votes	%
Rolen Paulino Jr. (incumbent)	Nacionalista Party	35,179	38.11
Jong Cortez	Independent	23,402	25.35
Echie Ponge	Partido Federal ng Pilipinas	21,776	23.59
Arnold Vegafria	PDP–Laban	11,946	12.94
Total		92,303	100.00
Valid votes		92,303	97.85
Invalid/blank votes		2,025	2.15
Total votes		94,328	100.00
Registered voters/turnout		122,899	76.75
Nacionalista hold			
Source: Commission on Elections

=== Vice Mayor ===
Term-limited incumbent Vice Mayor Jong Cortez ran for mayor of Olongapo as an independent.

Cortez endorsed Kaye Ann Legaspi (Aksyon Demokratiko), who won the election against city councilors Rodel Cerezo (Lakas–CMD), Gina Perez (Partido Federal ng Pilipinas) and Lugie Lipumano (Katipunan ng Nagkakaisang Pilipino) and Prudencio Jalandoni (Independent).

Candidate	Party	Votes	%
Kaye Ann Legaspi	Aksyon Demokratiko	39,304	43.66
Rodel Cerezo	Lakas–CMD	19,076	21.19
Lugie Lipumano	Katipunan ng Nagkakaisang Pilipino	17,606	19.56
Gina Perez	Partido Federal ng Pilipinas	12,772	14.19
Prudencio Jalandoni	Independent	1,260	1.40
Total		90,018	100.00
Valid votes		90,018	95.43
Invalid/blank votes		4,310	4.57
Total votes		94,328	100.00
Registered voters/turnout		122,899	76.75
Aksyon gain from Independent			
Source: Commission on Elections

=== City Council ===
The Olongapo City Council is composed of 12 councilors, 10 of whom are elected.

35 candidates were included in the ballot.

The Nacionalista Party tied with Lakas–CMD at three seats each, losing its status as the largest party in the city council.

Party	Votes	%	Seats	+/–
Nacionalista Party	176,215	25.18	3	–3
Lakas–CMD	120,095	17.16	3	New
Partido Federal ng Pilipinas	106,826	15.26	1	+1
PDP–Laban	73,839	10.55	0	–1
People's Reform Party	60,696	8.67	1	New
Kilusang Bagong Lipunan	8,673	1.24	0	New
Independent	153,599	21.94	2	+1
Total	699,943	100.00	10	0
Total votes	94,328	–		
Registered voters/turnout	122,899	76.75		
Source: Commission on Elections

Candidate	Party	Votes	%
Jamiel Escalona (incumbent)	Lakas–CMD	45,867	6.55
Vic-vic Magsaysay (incumbent)	People's Reform Party	44,438	6.35
Tata Paulino (incumbent)	Nacionalista Party	44,139	6.31
Rodolfo Catologan (incumbent)	Lakas–CMD	40,936	5.85
Noel Atienza	Nacionalista Party	40,015	5.72
Tet Marzan	Independent	37,846	5.41
BJ Cajudo	Nacionalista Party	37,357	5.34
Gie Baloy	Independent	34,274	4.90
Ying Anonat (incumbent)	Lakas–CMD	33,292	4.76
Jack Gardon	Partido Federal ng Pilipinas	29,046	4.15
Edwin Esposo	Independent	27,737	3.96
Rowel Catigawan	Partido Federal ng Pilipinas	23,862	3.41
Joy Macapagal	Partido Federal ng Pilipinas	22,785	3.26
Donald Aquino	Nacionalista Party	22,124	3.16
Dong Galang	Partido Federal ng Pilipinas	20,013	2.86
Lacbain Jason	Independent	19,647	2.81
Randy Sionzon	Nacionalista Party	17,630	2.52
Benjamin John Defensor	People's Reform Party	16,258	2.32
Arnie Tamayo	Independent	15,907	2.27
Ian Vegafia Bautista	PDP–Laban	15,751	2.25
DM Muega	Nacionalista Party	14,950	2.14
Moises Du	Partido Federal ng Pilipinas	11,120	1.59
Macky Alonzo	PDP–Laban	10,570	1.51
Edwin Piano	Independent	9,567	1.37
Ernelizar Batapa	Kilusang Bagong Lipunan	8,673	1.24
Jerome Ducos	PDP–Laban	8,650	1.24
Earl Escusa	PDP–Laban	7,213	1.03
Cristina de Leon	PDP–Laban	6,523	0.93
Derrick Manuel	PDP–Laban	6,096	0.87
Jan Guiseppe Abarro	PDP–Laban	6,030	0.86
Bien Azores	Independent	4,929	0.70
Erick Ison	PDP–Laban	4,500	0.64
Pocholo Galian	PDP–Laban	4,297	0.61
Bhong Tocayon	PDP–Laban	4,209	0.60
Cris Tooley Jr.	Independent	3,692	0.53
Total		699,943	100.00
Total votes		94,328	–
Registered voters/turnout		122,899	76.75
Source: Commission on Elections

== Pampanga ==
=== Governor ===
Incumbent Governor Dennis Pineda of the Nationalist People's Coalition ran for vice governor of Pampanga.

Pineda endorsed his mother, Lilia Pineda (Kambilan), who won the election against former Candaba mayor Danilo Baylon (Independent) and Amado Santos (Independent).

Candidate	Party	Votes	%
Lilia Pineda	Kambilan	709,694	59.48
Danilo Baylon	Independent	476,642	39.95
Amado Santos	Independent	6,864	0.58
Total		1,193,200	100.00
Valid votes		1,193,200	95.43
Invalid/blank votes		57,091	4.57
Total votes		1,250,291	100.00
Registered voters/turnout		1,463,014	85.46
Kambilan gain from NPC			
Source: Commission on Elections

=== Vice Governor ===
Incumbent Vice Governor Lilia Pineda of Kambilan ran for governor of Pampanga.

Pineda endorsed her son, Dennis Pineda (Nationalist People's Coalition), who won the election against former Pampanga governor Eddie Panlilio (Liberal Party).

Candidate	Party	Votes	%
Dennis Pineda	Nationalist People's Coalition	751,077	65.99
Ed Panlilio	Liberal Party	387,056	34.01
Total		1,138,133	100.00
Valid votes		1,138,133	91.03
Invalid/blank votes		112,158	8.97
Total votes		1,250,291	100.00
Registered voters/turnout		1,463,014	85.46
NPC gain from Kambilan			
Source: Commission on Elections

=== Provincial Board ===
The Pampanga Provincial Board is composed of 13 board members, 10 of whom are elected.

Kambilan won seven seats, gaining a majority in the provincial board.

Party	Votes	%	Seats	+/–
Kambilan	1,166,882	56.90	7	+3
Lakas–CMD	389,553	19.00	2	New
Nacionalista Party	104,887	5.11	0	–1
Independent	389,346	18.99	1	+1
Total	2,050,668	100.00	10	0
Total votes	1,250,291	–		
Registered voters/turnout	1,463,014	85.46		
Source: Commission on Elections

==== 1st district ====
Pampanga's 1st provincial district consists of the same area as Pampanga's 1st legislative district, excluding Angeles City. Two board members are elected from this provincial district.

Five candidates were included in the ballot.

Candidate	Party	Votes	%
Cherry Manalo	Kambilan	94,351	33.52
Christian Halili	Kambilan	81,808	29.07
Joel Cruz	Independent	68,496	24.34
Willy Villavicencio	Lakas–CMD	31,673	11.25
Ver Medardo Orquia	Independent	5,129	1.82
Total		281,457	100.00
Total votes		195,032	–
Registered voters/turnout		229,443	85.00
Source: Commission on Elections

==== 2nd district ====
Pampanga's 2nd provincial district consists of the same area as Pampanga's 2nd legislative district. Three board members are elected from this provincial district.

Five candidates were included in the ballot.

Candidate	Party	Votes	%
Fritzie David-Dizon (incumbent)	Kambilan	158,100	30.42
Sajid Eusoof (incumbent)	Kambilan	151,018	29.06
Claire Lim	Kambilan	118,709	22.84
Wardy Chu Jr.	Independent	55,376	10.66
Loreto delos Santos Jr.	Independent	36,458	7.02
Total		519,661	100.00
Total votes		314,489	–
Registered voters/turnout		372,379	84.45
Source: Commission on Elections

==== 3rd district ====
Pampanga's 3rd provincial district consists of the same area as Pampanga's 3rd legislative district. Three board members are elected from this provincial district.

Six candidates were included in the ballot.

Candidate	Party	Votes	%
Mymy Mercado	Lakas–CMD	194,719	25.56
Lucky Labung (incumbent)	Kambilan	189,388	24.86
Shiwen Lim	Independent	136,100	17.86
Raul Macalino	Kambilan	123,542	16.22
Alfie Bonifacio	Kambilan	86,321	11.33
Rouel Fausto	Independent	31,828	4.18
Total		761,898	100.00
Total votes		410,861	–
Registered voters/turnout		475,143	86.47
Source: Commission on Elections

==== 4th district ====
Pampanga's 4th provincial district consists of the same area as Pampanga's 4th legislative district. Two board members are elected from this provincial district.

Five candidates were included in the ballot.

Candidate	Party	Votes	%
Kaye Naguit	Kambilan	163,645	33.56
Vince Calara	Lakas–CMD	121,624	24.94
Nestor Tolentino	Nacionalista Party	104,887	21.51
Ric Yabut	Independent	55,959	11.48
Sky Maglanque	Lakas–CMD	41,537	8.52
Total		487,652	100.00
Total votes		329,909	–
Registered voters/turnout		386,049	85.46
Source: Commission on Elections

== Tarlac ==
=== Governor ===
Term-limited incumbent Governor Susan Yap of the Nationalist People's Coalition ran for mayor of Tarlac City.

Yap endorsed her son, representative Christian Yap (Sama Sama Tarlac), who won the election against Paniqui mayor Max Roxas (Partido Federal ng Pilipinas) and three other candidates. Christian Yap was the substitute to his uncle, former representative Victor Yap. Victor initially ran for governor of Tarlac, but later substituted Christian to run for the House of Representatives in Tarlac's 2nd legislative district.

Candidate	Party	Votes	%
Christian Yap	Sama Sama Tarlac	482,338	63.72
Max Roxas	Partido Federal ng Pilipinas	256,827	33.93
Kathryn Ann Basco	Independent	8,823	1.17
Mark Joseph Garcia	Independent	7,256	0.96
Fredo Bie	Independent	1,779	0.23
Total		757,023	100.00
Valid votes		757,023	91.46
Invalid/blank votes		70,646	8.54
Total votes		827,669	100.00
Registered voters/turnout		936,003	88.43
SST gain from NPC			
Source: Commission on Elections

=== Vice Governor ===
Term-limited incumbent Vice Governor Casada David of the Nationalist People's Coalition (NPC) ran for the Tarlac Provincial Board in the 3rd provincial district.

The NPC nominated Moncada mayor Lita Aquino, who won the election against former Tarlac vice governor Marcelino Aganon (Partido Federal ng Pilipinas) and Dual Estabillo (Independent).

Candidate	Party	Votes	%
Lita Aquino	Nationalist People's Coalition	349,308	52.45
Marcelino Aganon	Partido Federal ng Pilipinas	297,751	44.71
Dual Estabillo	Independent	18,919	2.84
Total		665,978	100.00
Valid votes		665,978	80.46
Invalid/blank votes		161,691	19.54
Total votes		827,669	100.00
Registered voters/turnout		936,003	88.43
NPC hold			
Source: Commission on Elections

=== Provincial Board ===
The Tarlac Provincial Board is composed of 13 board members, 10 of whom are elected.

The Nationalist People's Coalition won seven seats, maintaining its majority in the provincial board.

Party	Votes	%	Seats	+/–
Nationalist People's Coalition	1,089,711	58.72	7	–2
Partido Federal ng Pilipinas	307,860	16.59	1	New
PROMDI	34,767	1.87	0	New
Independent	423,574	22.82	2	+1
Total	1,855,912	100.00	10	0
Total votes	827,669	–		
Registered voters/turnout	936,003	88.43		
Source: Commission on Elections

==== 1st district ====
Tarlac's 1st provincial district consists of the same area as Tarlac's 1st legislative district. Three board members are elected from this provincial district.

Six candidates were included in the ballot.

Candidate	Party	Votes	%
Pearl Erguiza Pacada	Nationalist People's Coalition	129,861	26.59
Joy Gilbert Lamorena (incumbent)	Nationalist People's Coalition	128,558	26.33
Tito Roxas	Nationalist People's Coalition	102,308	20.95
Jayrold Roxas	Partido Federal ng Pilipinas	68,668	14.06
Win Corpuz	Partido Federal ng Pilipinas	33,386	6.84
Dagul Felix	Partido Federal ng Pilipinas	25,553	5.23
Total		488,334	100.00
Total votes		249,853	–
Registered voters/turnout		285,992	87.36
Source: Commission on Elections

==== 2nd district ====
Tarlac's 2nd provincial district consists of the same area as Tarlac's 2nd legislative district. Four board members are elected from this provincial district.

Eight candidates were included in the ballot.

Candidate	Party	Votes	%
Harmes Sembrano (incumbent)	Nationalist People's Coalition	165,838	19.87
Dennis Go (incumbent)	Independent	157,189	18.84
Topey delos Reyes (incumbent)	Independent	139,597	16.73
Arron Villaflor	Partido Federal ng Pilipinas	119,858	14.36
Ricky Diolazo	Nationalist People's Coalition	114,037	13.67
Vlad Rodriguez	Nationalist People's Coalition	94,952	11.38
Gilbert Aquino	Independent	27,751	3.33
Gab Hayashi	Independent	15,203	1.82
Total		834,425	100.00
Total votes		319,965	–
Registered voters/turnout		355,968	89.89
Source: Commission on Elections

==== 3rd district ====
Tarlac's 3rd provincial district consists of the same area as Tarlac's 3rd legislative district. Three board members are elected from this provincial district.

11 candidates were included in the ballot.

Candidate	Party	Votes	%
Tootsie Cruz (incumbent)	Nationalist People's Coalition	140,753	26.40
Casada David	Nationalist People's Coalition	108,299	20.31
Ton Villanueva	Nationalist People's Coalition	105,105	19.71
Boy Mandal	Independent	62,641	11.75
Ariel Mungcal	Partido Federal ng Pilipinas	38,285	7.18
Hariking David	PROMDI	34,767	6.52
Paul John Bernardo	Partido Federal ng Pilipinas	22,110	4.15
Lopi Alcala	Independent	6,637	1.24
Jose Magbag	Independent	6,500	1.22
Arlene Obor	Independent	4,476	0.84
Sam Bulaga	Independent	3,580	0.67
Total		533,153	100.00
Total votes		257,851	–
Registered voters/turnout		294,043	87.69
Source: Commission on Elections

== Zambales ==
=== Governor ===
Incumbent Governor Hermogenes Ebdane of the Sulong Zambales Party ran for a third term.

Ebdane won re-election against Aeta leader Chito Bulatao Balintay (Independent). Balintay's candidacy was initially rejected by the Commission on Elections (COMELEC). However, the Supreme Court ordered on January 14, 2025, to include Balintay in the ballot. The Supreme Court later ordered the COMELEC on March 4, to accept Balintay's candidacy.

Candidate	Party	Votes	%
Hermogenes Ebdane (incumbent)	Sulong Zambales Party	306,367	90.85
Chito Bulatao Balintay	Independent	30,857	9.15
Total		337,224	100.00
Valid votes		337,224	92.41
Invalid/blank votes		27,701	7.59
Total votes		364,925	100.00
Registered voters/turnout		429,237	85.02
SZP hold			
Source: Commission on Elections

=== Vice Governor ===
Incumbent Vice Governor Jaq Khonghun of Lakas–CMD won re-election for a second term unopposed. She was previously affiliated with Aksyon Demokratiko.

Candidate	Party	Votes	%
Jaq Khonghun (incumbent)	Lakas–CMD	279,807	100.00
Total		279,807	100.00
Valid votes		279,807	76.68
Invalid/blank votes		85,118	23.32
Total votes		364,925	100.00
Registered voters/turnout		429,237	85.02
Lakas hold			
Source: Commission on Elections

=== Provincial Board ===
The Zambales Provincial Board is composed of 14 board members, 10 of whom are elected.

The Sulong Zambales Party won nine seats, maintaining its majority in the provincial board.

Party	Votes	%	Seats	+/–
Sulong Zambales Party	987,826	80.12	9	+1
Nationalist People's Coalition	158,433	12.85	1	+1
Independent	86,676	7.03	0	0
Total	1,232,935	100.00	10	0
Total votes	364,925	–		
Registered voters/turnout	429,237	85.02		
Source: Commission on Elections

==== 1st district ====
Zambales's 1st provincial district consists of the same area as Zambales's 1st legislative district, excluding Olongapo. Three board members are elected from this provincial district.

Three candidates were included in the ballot.

Candidate	Party	Votes	%
Cecil Felarca-Rafanan	Sulong Zambales Party	68,244	35.88
Ike Delgado (incumbent)	Sulong Zambales Party	64,243	33.77
Elmer Tumaca	Sulong Zambales Party	57,734	30.35
Total		190,221	100.00
Total votes		104,809	–
Registered voters/turnout		130,418	80.36
Source: Commission on Elections

==== 2nd district ====
Zambales's 2nd provincial district consists of the same area as Zambales's 2nd legislative district. Seven board members are elected from this provincial district.

Ten candidates were included in the ballot.

Candidate	Party	Votes	%
Rundy Ebdane (incumbent)	Sulong Zambales Party	158,804	15.23
Reena Mae Collado (incumbent)	Sulong Zambales Party	137,615	13.20
Sam Ablola (incumbent)	Sulong Zambales Party	123,806	11.87
Jury Deloso	Nationalist People's Coalition	112,502	10.79
Sancho Abasta III (incumbent)	Sulong Zambales Party	110,623	10.61
Eric Matibag	Sulong Zambales Party	100,127	9.60
Reynaldo Tarongoy (incumbent)	Sulong Zambales Party	86,847	8.33
Noel Ferrer	Independent	86,676	8.31
Lugil Ragadio (incumbent)	Sulong Zambales Party	79,783	7.65
Jap Fallorin	Nationalist People's Coalition	45,931	4.40
Total		1,042,714	100.00
Total votes		260,116	–
Registered voters/turnout		298,819	87.05
Source: Commission on Elections
