= 2019 Iba local elections =

Council polls

← 2016	May 13, 2019	2022 →
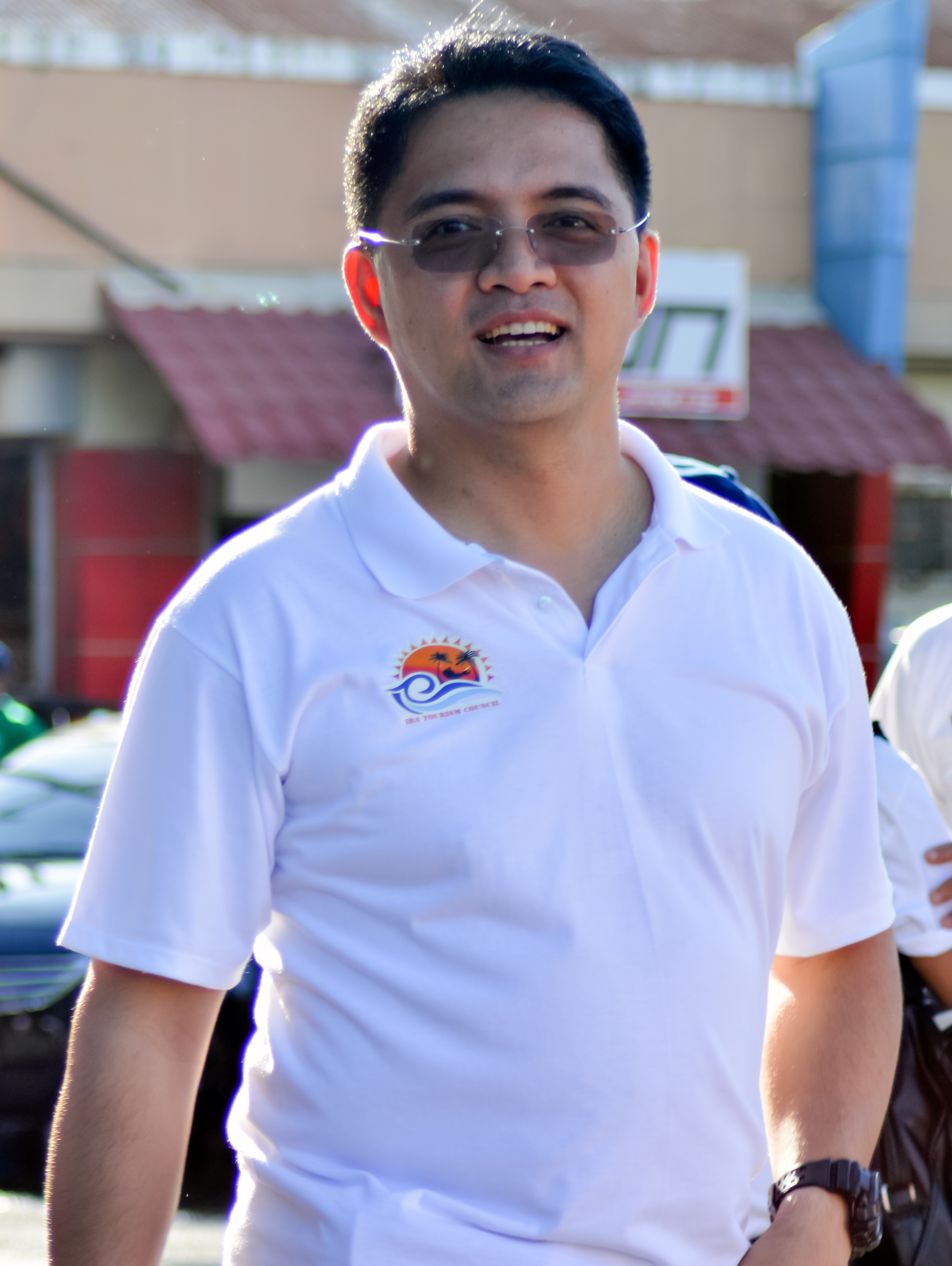

Nominee	Jun Rundstedt Ebdane	Ad Hebert Deloso
Party	PDP–Laban	NPC
Running mate	Irene Maniquiz-Biñan	Jun Farin
Popular vote	18,544	6,303
Percentage	74.63%	25.36%
Mayor before election
Jun Rundstedt Ebdane
SZP
Elected mayor
Jun Rundstedt Ebdane
SZP

Elections were held in Iba, Zambales on May 13, 2019 during the 2019 Philippine general election to decide upon the positions of mayor, vice mayor, and councillors.

== Candidates ==
=== Mayor ===
The incumbent mayor is Jun Rundstedt Ebdane, who has held this position since 2013.

Iba Mayoralty Election
Party	Candidate	Votes	%
PDP–Laban	Jun Rundstedt Ebdane	18,544	74.63
NPC	Ad Hebert Deloso	6,303	25.37
Total votes		24,847	100.00

=== Vice Mayor ===
The incumbent vice mayor is Irene Maniquiz-Biñan.

Iba Vice Mayoralty Election
Party	Candidate	Votes	%
PDP–Laban	Irene Maniquiz-Biñan	16,852	69.67
NPC	Benjamin "Jun" Farin Jr.	7,337	30.33
Total votes		24,189	100.00

=== Councilors ===
Councilors
Party	Candidate	Votes	%
PDP–Laban	Margie Maniquiz Noveno	13,170	
PDP–Laban	Salvador Redondo	12,032	
PDP–Laban	Danilo Ballesteros	11,327	
MAKIMAZA	Francisco "Frank" Aldea	11,013	
NPC	Al Fallorin	10,596	
PDP–Laban	Isagani Yap	9,409	
MAKIMAZA	Lanie Tabile	7,960	
PDP–Laban	Lilia Butaran	7,864	
NPC	Gerry Montefalcon	7,773	
PDP–Laban	Sixta Bangug	7,408	
NPC	Renato Abong	6,710	
Independent	Noel Sarmiento	5,515	
PDP–Laban	Evelyn Samaniego	5,295	
PDP–Laban	Marcelie Ferrer	5,278	
Independent	Ding Aguila	5,273	
Independent	Vic Pamoleras	5,000	
MAKIMAZA	Mayong Agabao	4,160	
NPC	Larry Edaño	4,153	
MAKIMAZA	Roland Abad	4,019	
MAKIMAZA	Cefereno Payumo	3,570	
NPC	Jeanet Del Fierro	3,159	
Independent	Donald Astronomo	2,808	
MAKIMAZA	Arnel Pascual	2,333	
Independent	Augusto Cabal	1,576	
Total votes			
