= 2022 Philippine local elections in Central Luzon =

- May 9, 2022
- Gubernatorial elections
- 7 provincial governors and 2 city mayors
Party	Seats	+/–
NPC	2	−1
PDP–Laban	2	+1
Kambilan	1	+1
Nacionalista	1	0
NUP	1	−1
Sigaw	1	0
SZP	1	New
This lists parties that won seats. See the complete results below.
- Vice gubernatorial elections
- 7 provincial vice governors and 2 city vice mayor
Party	Seats	+/–
Kambilan	2	+1
NUP	2	0
Aksyon	1	New
NPC	1	0
PDP–Laban	1	−1
Sigaw	1	0
Independent	1	0
This lists parties that won seats. See the complete results below.
- Provincial Board elections
- 68 provincial board members and 20 city councilors
Party	Seats	+/–
PDP–Laban	14	0
NPC	13	−1
Kambilan	11	+4
Nacionalista	11	+2
NUP	9	−9
SZP	8	New
Sigaw	7	+1
LDP	4	0
Lakas	3	+3
Aksyon	2	+1
PAK	2	−5
KANP	1	New
PFP	1	−3
PROMDI	1	New
WPP	1	+1
Independent	2	0
This lists parties that won seats. See the complete results below.

The 2022 Philippine local elections in Central Luzon were held on May 9, 2022.

== Summary ==
=== Governors ===
Province/city	Incumbent	Incumbent's party	Winner	Winner's party	Winning margin
Angeles City (HUC)	Carmelo Lazatin Jr.	Kambilan	Carmelo Lazatin Jr.	Kambilan	40.74%
Aurora	Gerardo Noveras	PDP–Laban	Christian Noveras	PDP–Laban	25.56%
Bataan	Albert Garcia	NUP	Joet Garcia	PDP–Laban	Unopposed
Bulacan	Daniel Fernando	NUP	Daniel Fernando	NUP	24.75%
Nueva Ecija	Aurelio Umali	Unang Sigaw	Aurelio Umali	Unang Sigaw	38.44%
Olongapo (HUC)	Rolen Paulino Jr.	Nacionalista	Rolen Paulino Jr.	Nacionalista	27.16%
Pampanga	Dennis Pineda	NPC	Dennis Pineda	NPC	17.90%
Tarlac	Susan Yap	NPC	Susan Yap	NPC	Unopposed
Zambales	Hermogenes Ebdane	SZP	Hermogenes Ebdane	SZP	19.83%

=== Vice governors ===
Province/city	Incumbent	Incumbent's party	Winner	Winner's party	Winning margin
Angeles City (HUC)	Vicky Vega	Kambilan	Vicky Vega	Kambilan	34.52%
Aurora	Christian Noveras	PDP–Laban	Gerardo Noveras	PDP–Laban	30.66%
Bataan	Cris Garcia	NUP	Cris Garcia	NUP	79.84%
Bulacan	Wilhelmino Sy-Alvarado	PDP–Laban	Alex Castro	NUP	8.27%
Nueva Ecija	Anthony Umali	Unang Sigaw	Anthony Umali	Unang Sigaw	38.12%
Olongapo (HUC)	Jong Cortez	Independent	Jong Cortez	Independent	22.15%
Pampanga	Lilia Pineda	Kambilan	Lilia Pineda	Kambilan	Unopposed
Tarlac	Casada David	NPC	Casada David	NPC	44.38%
Zambales	Jay Khonghun	Nacionalista	Jaq Khonghun	Aksyon	41.06%

=== Provincial boards ===
Province/city	Seats	Party control		Composition
Province/city	Seats	Previous	Result	Composition
Angeles City (HUC)	10 elected 2 ex-officio	PAK	Kambilan	Kambilan (7); PAK (2); PROMDI (1)
Aurora	8 elected 4 ex-officio	No majority	No majority	LDP (4); PDP–Laban (2); Lakas (1); Nacionalista (1)
Bataan	10 elected 4 ex-officio	NUP	No majority	NUP (3); Nacionalista (3); Lakas (2); PDP–Laban (2)
Bulacan	12 elected 4 ex-officio	NUP	No majority	NUP (6); PDP–Laban (6)
Nueva Ecija	10 elected 4 ex-officio	No majority	No majority	Unang Sigaw (7); PDP–Laban (3)
Olongapo (HUC)	10 elected 2 ex-officio	Nacionalista	No majority	Nacionalista (6); PDP–Laban (1); Aksyon (1); KNP (1); Independent (1)
Pampanga	10 elected 3 ex-officio	No majority	No majority	Kambilan (4); NPC (4); Nacionalista (1); Aksyon (1)
Tarlac	10 elected 3 ex-officio	NPC	NPC	NPC (9); Independent (1)
Zambales	10 elected 4 ex-officio	PDP–Laban	SZP	SZP (8); WPP (1); PFP (1)

== Angeles City ==
=== Mayor ===
Incumbent Mayor Carmelo Lazatin Jr. of Kambilan ran for a second term. He was previously affiliated with the Partido Federal ng Pilipinas.

Lazatin won re-election against city councilor Amos Rivera (Aksyon Demokratiko).

Candidate	Party	Votes	%
Carmelo Lazatin Jr. (incumbent)	Kambilan	112,953	70.37
Amos Rivera	Aksyon Demokratiko	47,561	29.63
Total		160,514	100.00
Total votes		172,636	–
Registered voters/turnout		205,822	83.88
Kambilan hold			
Source: Commission on Elections

=== Vice Mayor ===
Incumbent Vice Mayor Vicky Vega of Kambilan ran for a second term. She was previously affiliated with the Partido Federal ng Pilipinas.

Vega won re-election against Pie Almario Juan (Aksyon Demokratiko).

Candidate	Party	Votes	%
Vicky Vega (incumbent)	Kambilan	102,473	67.26
Pie Almario Juan	Aksyon Demokratiko	49,873	32.74
Total		152,346	100.00
Total votes		172,636	–
Registered voters/turnout		205,822	83.88
Kambilan hold			
Source: Commission on Elections

=== City Council ===
The Angeles City Council is composed of 12 councilors, 10 of whom are elected.

26 candidates were included in the ballot.

Kambilan won seven seats, gaining a majority in the city council.

Party	Votes	%	Seats	+/–
Kambilan	648,550	53.51	7	+6
Aksyon Demokratiko	172,075	14.20	0	New
Partido Abe Kapampangan	130,860	10.80	2	–5
PROMDI	125,667	10.37	1	New
PDP–Laban	52,065	4.30	0	0
Independent	82,866	6.84	0	0
Total	1,212,083	100.00	10	0
Total votes	172,636	–		
Registered voters/turnout	205,822	83.88		

Candidate	Party	Votes	%
Pogs Suller (incumbent)	Kambilan	94,792	7.82
JC Parker Aguas (incumbent)	Kambilan	88,170	7.27
Dan Lacson (incumbent)	Kambilan	77,859	6.42
Jay Sangil (incumbent)	Kambilan	75,017	6.19
Niknok Bañola (incumbent)	Kambilan	71,967	5.94
Alex Indiongco	Partido Abe Kapampangan	69,297	5.72
Raco Paolo del Rosario (incumbent)	Kambilan	63,223	5.22
Edu Pamintuan	Partido Abe Kapampangan	61,563	5.08
Joseph Alfie Bonifacio (incumbent)	Kambilan	60,229	4.97
Chris Cortez	PROMDI	60,005	4.95
Rodelio Mamac Jr.	Kambilan	59,234	4.89
Christopher Joseph Ponce	Kambilan	58,059	4.79
Alexander Cauguiran	Independent	54,410	4.49
Ron Pineda	PDP–Laban	52,065	4.30
Alma Mercado	PROMDI	43,494	3.59
Jeselle Ann Dayrit	Aksyon Demokratiko	40,239	3.32
Bong Arceo	Aksyon Demokratiko	33,304	2.75
Israel Forto	Aksyon Demokratiko	31,232	2.58
Harvs Santiago	Aksyon Demokratiko	27,383	2.26
Don Edward Quito	Aksyon Demokratiko	20,522	1.69
Danizen Aloot	Aksyon Demokratiko	19,395	1.60
Paul Maiquez	PROMDI	19,249	1.59
Randy Malonzo	Independent	12,732	1.05
William Aguilar	Independent	9,458	0.78
Nong Tamayo	Independent	6,266	0.52
Bry Eribal	PROMDI	2,919	0.24
Total		1,212,083	100.00
Total votes		172,636	–
Registered voters/turnout		205,822	83.88
Source: Commission on Elections

== Aurora ==
=== Governor ===
Term-limited incumbent Governor Gerardo Noveras of PDP–Laban ran for vice governor of Aurora. He was previously affiliated with the Nationalist People's Coalition.

PDP–Laban nominated Noveras' son, Aurora vice governor Christian Noveras, who won the election against provincial board member Sid Galban (Laban ng Demokratikong Pilipino).

Candidate	Party	Votes	%
Christian Noveras	PDP–Laban	76,220	62.78
Sid Galban	Laban ng Demokratikong Pilipino	45,187	37.22
Total		121,407	100.00
Total votes		130,167	–
Registered voters/turnout		154,688	84.15
PDP–Laban hold			
Source: Commission on Elections

=== Vice Governor ===
Incumbent Vice Governor Christian Noveras of PDP–Laban ran for governor of Aurora.

PDP–Laban nominated Noveras' father, Aurora governor Gerardo Noveras, who won the election against former Dipaculao vice mayor Narciso Amansec (Laban ng Demokratikong Pilipino).

On September 6, 2023, the Commission on Elections disqualified Noveras for the use of government resources in his campaign.

Candidate	Party	Votes	%
Gerardo Noveras	PDP–Laban	77,378	65.33
Narciso Amansec	Laban ng Demokratikong Pilipino	41,070	34.67
Total		118,448	100.00
Total votes		130,167	–
Registered voters/turnout		154,688	84.15
PDP–Laban hold			
Source: Commission on Elections

=== Provincial Board ===
The Aurora Provincial Board is composed of 12 board members, eight of whom are elected.

Laban ng Demokratikong Pilipino won four seats, remaining as the largest party in the provincial board.

Party	Votes	%	Seats	+/–
Laban ng Demokratikong Pilipino	160,169	42.20	4	0
PDP–Laban	107,407	28.30	2	New
Liberal Party	50,004	13.17	0	0
Lakas–CMD	30,670	8.08	1	New
Nacionalista Party	28,626	7.54	1	0
Independent	2,692	0.71	0	0
Total	379,568	100.00	8	0
Total votes	130,167	–		
Registered voters/turnout	154,688	84.15		

==== 1st district ====
Aurora's 1st provincial district consists of the municipalities of Baler, Dingalan, Maria Aurora and San Luis. Four board members are elected from this provincial district.

Nine candidates were included in the ballot.

Candidate	Party	Votes	%
Santy Palmero (incumbent)	Laban ng Demokratikong Pilipino	34,471	14.11
Jake Galban	Laban ng Demokratikong Pilipino	34,269	14.03
Butch Bautista (incumbent)	Lakas–CMD	30,670	12.55
Annabelle Tangson	Nacionalista Party	28,626	11.72
Verna Catusalem	PDP–Laban	27,307	11.18
Gian Ong	Liberal Party	25,434	10.41
Jun Aznar	Liberal Party	24,570	10.06
Michael Palispis	Laban ng Demokratikong Pilipino	22,811	9.34
Onasis Ronquillo	PDP–Laban	16,169	6.62
Total		244,327	100.00
Total votes		80,436	–
Registered voters/turnout		95,292	84.41
Source: Commission on Elections

==== 2nd district ====
Aurora's 2nd provincial district consists of the municipalities of Casiguran, Dilasag, Dinalungan and Dipaculao. Four board members are elected from this provincial district.

Nine candidates were included in the ballot.

Candidate	Party	Votes	%
Reynante Tolentino	Laban ng Demokratikong Pilipino	24,279	17.95
Jennifer Araña (incumbent)	PDP–Laban	23,764	17.57
Lordan Roxas (incumbent)	PDP–Laban	16,815	12.43
Lito Pascua	Laban ng Demokratikong Pilipino	16,474	12.18
Ruben Alipio Jr.	Laban ng Demokratikong Pilipino	15,564	11.51
Percy Salamera	PDP–Laban	14,374	10.63
Pablo Miran	Laban ng Demokratikong Pilipino	12,301	9.10
Rogelio Molina	PDP–Laban	8,978	6.64
Evelinda Estocapio	Independent	2,692	1.99
Total		135,241	100.00
Total votes		49,731	–
Registered voters/turnout		59,396	83.73
Source: Commission on Elections

== Bataan ==
=== Governor ===
Term-limited incumbent Governor Albert Garcia of the National Unity Party ran for the House of Representatives in Bataan's 2nd legislative district.

Garcia endorsed his brother, representative Joet Garcia (PDP–Laban), who won the election unopposed.

Candidate	Party	Votes	%
Joet Garcia	PDP–Laban	376,924	100.00
Total		376,924	100.00
Total votes		498,293	–
Registered voters/turnout		566,479	87.96
PDP–Laban gain from NUP			
Source: Commission on Elections

=== Vice Governor ===
Incumbent Vice Governor Cris Garcia of the National Unity Party ran for a second term.

Garcia won re-election against two other candidates.

Candidate	Party	Votes	%
Cris Garcia (incumbent)	National Unity Party	340,594	87.19
Ronil Castro	Independent	28,694	7.35
Joemel Pugna	Independent	21,366	5.47
Total		390,654	100.00
Total votes		498,293	–
Registered voters/turnout		566,479	87.96
NUP hold			
Source: Commission on Elections

=== Provincial Board ===
The Bataan Provincial Board is composed of 14 board members, 10 of whom are elected.

The National Unity Party tied with the Nacionalista Party at three seats each.

Party	Votes	%	Seats	+/–
National Unity Party	265,298	25.21	3	–5
Nacionalista Party	258,794	24.59	3	+2
Lakas–CMD	179,680	17.07	2	New
PDP–Laban	166,128	15.78	2	+1
Partido Demokratiko Sosyalista ng Pilipinas	90,414	8.59	0	New
PROMDI	84,315	8.01	0	New
Independent	7,907	0.75	0	0
Total	1,052,536	100.00	10	0
Total votes	498,293	–		
Registered voters/turnout	566,479	87.96		

==== 1st district ====
Bataan's 1st provincial district consists of the same area as Bataan's 1st legislative district. The municipalities of Dinalupihan and Morong used to be a part of this provincial district until 2021, when they became part of the new 3rd provincial district. Three board members are elected from this provincial district.

Four candidates were included in the ballot.

Candidate	Party	Votes	%
Tony Roman	Lakas–CMD	91,618	37.15
Benjie Serrano (incumbent)	Nacionalista Party	79,767	32.34
Jomar Gaza (incumbent)	PDP–Laban	67,348	27.31
Armando Atienza	Independent	7,907	3.21
Total		246,640	100.00
Total votes		138,724	–
Registered voters/turnout		156,757	88.50
Source: Commission on Elections

==== 2nd district ====
Bataan's 2nd provincial district consists of the same area as Bataan's 2nd legislative district. The municipalities of Bagac and Mariveles used to be a part of this provincial district until 2021, when they became part of the new 3rd provincial district. Three board members are elected from this provincial district.

Three candidates were included in the ballot.

Candidate	Party	Votes	%
Iya Roque (incumbent)	National Unity Party	109,315	37.60
Manny Beltran (incumbent)	Nacionalista Party	93,385	32.12
Noel Valdecañas	Lakas–CMD	88,062	30.29
Total		290,762	100.00
Total votes		173,406	–
Registered voters/turnout		197,735	87.70
Source: Commission on Elections

==== 3rd district ====
Bataan's 3rd provincial district consists of the same area as Bataan's 3rd legislative district. The provincial district was created in 2021, with the municipalities of Dinalupihan and Morong from the 1st provincial district and the municipalities of Bagac and Mariveles from the 2nd provincial district. Four board members are elected from this provincial district.

Eight candidates were included in the ballot.

Candidate	Party	Votes	%
Popoy del Rosario (incumbent)	PDP–Laban	98,780	19.18
Jorge Estanislao	National Unity Party	90,062	17.48
Angel Sunga	Nacionalista Party	85,642	16.63
Harold Espeleta	National Unity Party	65,921	12.80
Joel Ibarra	Partido Demokratiko Sosyalista ng Pilipinas	56,760	11.02
Marimel Lopez	PROMDI	45,226	8.78
Ace Liloc	PROMDI	39,089	7.59
Anthony Zalavaria Galorpo	Partido Demokratiko Sosyalista ng Pilipinas	33,654	6.53
Total		515,134	100.00
Total votes		186,163	–
Registered voters/turnout		211,987	87.82
Source: Commission on Elections

== Bulacan ==
=== Governor ===
Incumbent Governor Daniel Fernando of the National Unity Party ran for a second term.

Fernando won re-election against Bulacan vice governor Wilhelmino Sy-Alvarado (PDP–Laban) and three other candidates.

Candidate	Party	Votes	%
Daniel Fernando (incumbent)	National Unity Party	987,160	61.00
Wilhelmino Sy-Alvarado	PDP–Laban	586,650	36.25
Pancho Valerio	Independent	23,228	1.44
Datu Adam Ocampo	Independent	10,958	0.68
Kaka Ernesto Balite	Independent	10,391	0.64
Total		1,618,387	100.00
Total votes		1,758,220	–
Registered voters/turnout		2,007,523	87.58
NUP hold			
Source: Commission on Elections

=== Vice Governor ===
Incumbent Vice Governor Wilhelmino Sy-Alvarado of PDP–Laban ran for governor of Bulacan. He was previously affiliated with the National Unity Party.

PDP–Laban nominated former representative Jonjon Mendoza, who was defeated by provincial board member Alex Castro of the National Unity Party. Former Meycauayan mayor Salvador Violago (Liberal Party) also ran for vice governor.

Candidate	Party	Votes	%
Alex Castro	National Unity Party	755,785	48.37
Jonjon Mendoza	PDP–Laban	626,656	40.10
Salvador Violago	Liberal Party	180,210	11.53
Total		1,562,651	100.00
Total votes		1,758,220	–
Registered voters/turnout		2,007,523	87.58
NUP hold			
Source: Commission on Elections

=== Provincial Board ===
Since Bulacan's redistricting in 2021, the Bulacan Provincial Board is composed of 16 board members, 12 of whom are elected.

The National Unity Party tied with PDP–Laban at six seats each, losing its majority in the provincial board.

Party	Votes	%	Seats	+/–
National Unity Party	1,009,844	40.88	6	–2
PDP–Laban	969,531	39.25	6	+4
Lakas–CMD	165,714	6.71	0	New
PROMDI	69,583	2.82	0	New
Liberal Party	58,040	2.35	0	New
Partido Federal ng Pilipinas	28,232	1.14	0	0
Aksyon Demokratiko	24,488	0.99	0	New
People's Reform Party	8,041	0.33	0	New
Kilusang Bagong Lipunan	6,691	0.27	0	New
Independent	130,043	5.26	0	New
Total	2,470,207	100.00	12	+2
Total votes	1,758,220	–		
Registered voters/turnout	2,007,523	87.58		

==== 1st district ====
Bulacan's 1st provincial district consists of the same area as Bulacan's 1st legislative district. Two board members are elected from this provincial district.

Seven candidates were included in the ballot.

Candidate	Party	Votes	%
Allan Andan (incumbent)	PDP–Laban	158,334	28.51
Mina Fermin (incumbent)	PDP–Laban	145,287	26.16
Toti Ople	National Unity Party	99,812	17.97
Jong Ople	National Unity Party	98,613	17.76
Long Repapit Mejia	PROMDI	38,048	6.85
Aldwin Angelo Rodriguez	Independent	8,073	1.45
Arnold Mercado	Independent	7,212	1.30
Total		555,379	100.00
Total votes		381,801	–
Registered voters/turnout		437,780	87.21
Source: Commission on Elections

==== 2nd district ====
Bulacan's 2nd provincial district consists of the same area as Bulacan's 2nd legislative district. The municipalities of Balagtas, Bocaue, Guiguinto and Pandi used to be a part of this provincial district until 2021, when they became part of the new 5th provincial district. Two board members are elected from this provincial district.

Five candidates were included in the ballot.

Candidate	Party	Votes	%
Pechay dela Cruz (incumbent)	National Unity Party	78,730	28.56
Dingdong Nicolas	PDP–Laban	60,508	21.95
Charm Clemente	Independent	57,145	20.73
Monet Posadas (incumbent)	National Unity Party	55,214	20.03
Grace Alcantara	PDP–Laban	24,038	8.72
Total		275,635	100.00
Total votes		196,901	–
Registered voters/turnout		224,922	87.54
Source: Commission on Elections

==== 3rd district ====
Bulacan's 3rd provincial district consists of the same area as Bulacan's 3rd legislative district. The municipalities of Angat and Norzagaray used to be a part of this provincial district until 2021, when they became part of the new 6th provincial district. Two board members are elected from this provincial district.

Four candidates were included in the ballot.

Candidate	Party	Votes	%
RC Nono Castro (incumbent)	National Unity Party	89,893	30.88
Aye Mariano	National Unity Party	88,403	30.36
Emily Viceo (incumbent)	Lakas–CMD	73,288	25.17
Luis Sarrondo	PDP–Laban	39,561	13.59
Total		291,145	100.00
Total votes		234,096	–
Registered voters/turnout		265,734	88.09
Source: Commission on Elections

==== 4th district ====
Bulacan's 4th provincial district consists of the same area as Bulacan's 4th legislative district. The municipality of Santa Maria used to be under this provincial district until 2021, when it became part of the new 6th provincial district. Two board members are elected from this provincial district.

Eight candidates were included in the ballot.

Candidate	Party	Votes	%
Jon-jon delos Santos (incumbent)	PDP–Laban	241,059	38.22
Allen Baluyut (incumbent)	National Unity Party	173,242	27.47
Paul Pillas	Lakas–CMD	92,426	14.65
Estelito Alcaraz	Independent	44,502	7.06
Marni delos Santos	Partido Federal ng Pilipinas	28,232	4.48
Edgar Mejia	Liberal Party	21,655	3.43
Jorick Atienza	PROMDI	21,564	3.42
Danny Clores	People's Reform Party	8,041	1.27
Total		630,721	100.00
Total votes		455,652	–
Registered voters/turnout		527,441	86.39
Source: Commission on Elections

==== 5th district ====
Bulacan's 5th provincial district consists of the same area as Bulacan's 5th legislative district. The provincial district was created in 2021, with the municipalities of Balagtas, Bocaue, Guiguinto and Pandi from the 2nd provincial district. Two board members are elected from this provincial district.

Seven candidates were included in the ballot.

Candidate	Party	Votes	%
Ricky Roque	National Unity Party	100,397	27.14
Teta Mendoza	National Unity Party	86,264	23.32
Anjo Mendoza	PDP–Laban	84,647	22.88
Lorna Libiran	PDP–Laban	55,694	15.06
Nick Sanchez	Aksyon Demokratiko	24,488	6.62
Let Cruz	Independent	11,719	3.17
Dan Alvaro Galura	Kilusang Bagong Lipunan	6,691	1.81
Total		369,900	100.00
Total votes		260,637	–
Registered voters/turnout		291,581	89.39
Source: Commission on Elections

==== 6th district ====
Bulacan's 6th provincial district consists of the same area as Bulacan's 6th legislative district. The provincial district was created in 2021, with the municipalities of Angat and Norzagaray from the 3rd provincial district and the municipality of Santa Maria from the 4th provincial district. Two board members are elected from this provincial district.

Six candidates were included in the ballot.

Candidate	Party	Votes	%
Jay de Guzman	PDP–Laban	87,367	25.15
Art Legaspi	PDP–Laban	73,036	21.02
Rico Sto. Domingo	National Unity Party	70,520	20.30
Junjun Saplala	National Unity Party	68,756	19.79
Boyet dela Cruz	Liberal Party	36,385	10.47
Jelo Lopez	PROMDI	9,971	2.87
Joseph Tica	Independent	1,392	0.40
Total		347,427	100.00
Total votes		229,133	–
Registered voters/turnout		260,065	88.11
Source: Commission on Elections

== Nueva Ecija ==
=== Governor ===
Incumbent Governor Aurelio Umali of Unang Sigaw ran for a second term.

Umali won re-election against Palayan mayor Rianne Cuevas (PDP–Laban).

Candidate	Party	Votes	%
Aurelio Umali (incumbent)	Unang Sigaw	826,876	69.22
Rianne Cuevas	PDP–Laban	367,716	30.78
Total		1,194,592	100.00
Total votes		1,297,243	–
Registered voters/turnout		1,541,685	84.14
Unang Sigaw hold			
Source: Commission on Elections

=== Vice Governor ===
Incumbent Vice Governor Anthony Umali of Unang Sigaw ran for a second term.

Umali won re-election against former Nueva Ecija vice governor Edward Thomas Joson (PDP–Laban) and Victoria Pinpin (Independent).

Candidate	Party	Votes	%
Anthony Umali (incumbent)	Unang Sigaw	786,167	68.57
Edward Thomas Joson	PDP–Laban	349,184	30.45
Victoria Pinpin	Independent	11,240	0.98
Total		1,146,591	100.00
Total votes		1,297,243	–
Registered voters/turnout		1,541,685	84.14
Unang Sigaw hold			
Source: Commission on Elections

=== Provincial Board ===
The Nueva Ecija Provincial Board is composed of 14 board members, 10 of whom are elected.

Unang Sigaw won seven seats, remaining as the largest party in the provincial board.

Party	Votes	%	Seats	+/–
Unang Sigaw	1,271,799	59.14	7	+1
PDP–Laban	859,442	39.97	3	+1
Independent	19,216	0.89	0	–1
Total	2,150,457	100.00	10	0
Total votes	1,297,243	–		
Registered voters/turnout	1,541,685	84.14		

==== 1st district ====
Nueva Ecija's 1st provincial district consists of the same area as Nueva Ecija's 1st legislative district. Two board members are elected from this provincial district.

Seven candidates were included in the ballot.

Candidate	Party	Votes	%
Rap Rap Villanueva (incumbent)	Unang Sigaw	166,514	27.53
Eric Salazar (incumbent)	Unang Sigaw	140,105	23.16
Ler de Guzman (incumbent)	Unang Sigaw	106,885	17.67
Fred Domingo	PDP–Laban	70,559	11.67
Richard Maliwat	PDP–Laban	62,775	10.38
Glenn Corpus	PDP–Laban	49,201	8.13
Aris Mateo	Independent	8,824	1.46
Total		604,863	100.00
Total votes		325,958	–
Registered voters/turnout		388,005	84.01
Source: Commission on Elections

==== 2nd district ====
Nueva Ecija's 2nd provincial district consists of the same area as Nueva Ecija's 2nd legislative district. Two board members are elected from this provincial district.

Three candidates were included in the ballot.

Candidate	Party	Votes	%
Jason Abalos	PDP–Laban	139,242	43.15
Dindo Dysico	Unang Sigaw	94,399	29.25
Wowowee Ortiz (incumbent)	Unang Sigaw	89,077	27.60
Total		322,718	100.00
Total votes		269,103	–
Registered voters/turnout		319,000	84.36
Source: Commission on Elections

==== 3rd district ====
Nueva Ecija's 3rd provincial district consists of the same area as Nueva Ecija's 3rd legislative district. Two board members are elected from this provincial district.

Four candidates were included in the ballot.

Candidate	Party	Votes	%
EJ Joson (incumbent)	PDP–Laban	152,164	30.88
Jojo Matias (incumbent)	PDP–Laban	144,775	29.38
Norgen Castillo	Unang Sigaw	109,001	22.12
Suka Garcia	Unang Sigaw	86,772	17.61
Total		492,712	100.00
Total votes		354,792	–
Registered voters/turnout		431,025	82.31
Source: Commission on Elections

==== 4th district ====
Nueva Ecija's 4th provincial district consists of the same area as Nueva Ecija's 4th legislative district. Two board members are elected from this provincial district.

Seven candidates were included in the ballot.

Candidate	Party	Votes	%
Nap Interior (incumbent)	Unang Sigaw	174,282	23.87
Tess Patiag (incumbent)	Unang Sigaw	153,255	20.99
Sweet Cruz	Unang Sigaw	151,509	20.75
Mikee Dayupay	PDP–Laban	85,755	11.74
Gerry dela Cruz	PDP–Laban	77,492	10.61
Adonis Balagtas	PDP–Laban	77,479	10.61
Raniel Bautista	Independent	10,392	1.42
Total		730,164	100.00
Total votes		347,390	–
Registered voters/turnout		403,655	86.06
Source: Commission on Elections

== Olongapo ==
=== Mayor ===
Incumbent Mayor Rolen Paulino Jr. of the Nacionalista Party ran for a second term.

Paulino won re-election against Barangay Gordon Heights chairwoman Echie Ponge (Aksyon Demokratiko), talent manager Arnold Vegafria (PDP–Laban), former Zambales vice governor Anne Gordon (Liberal Party) and two other candidates.

Candidate	Party	Votes	%
Rolen Paulino Jr. (incumbent)	Nacionalista Party	53,117	54.30
Echie Ponge	Aksyon Demokratiko	26,549	27.14
Arnold Vegafria	PDP–Laban	14,742	15.07
Anne Gordon	Liberal Party	2,896	2.96
Boy Cunanan	Independent	305	0.31
Delfin Pradas	Partido Federal ng Pilipinas	204	0.21
Total		97,813	100.00
Total votes		101,801	–
Registered voters/turnout		123,707	82.29
Nacionalista hold			
Source: Commission on Elections

=== Vice Mayor ===
Incumbent Vice Mayor Jong Cortez ran for a third term as an independent.

Cortez won re-election against Jack Gardon (Partido Federal ng Pilipinas), Barangay Old Cabalan chairman Lester Nadong (PDP–Laban) and two other candidates.

Candidate	Party	Votes	%
Jong Cortez (incumbent)	Independent	53,432	56.61
Jack Gardon	Partido Federal ng Pilipinas	32,529	34.46
Lester Nadong	PDP–Laban	5,668	6.00
Prudy Jalandoni	Liberal Party	1,958	2.07
Arthur Santiago	Independent	806	0.85
Total		94,393	100.00
Total votes		101,801	–
Registered voters/turnout		123,707	82.29
Independent hold			
Source: Commission on Elections

=== City Council ===
The Olongapo City Council is composed of 12 councilors, 10 of whom are elected.

62 candidates were included in the ballot.

The Nacionalista Party remained as the largest party in the city council with six seats, but lost its majority.

Party	Votes	%	Seats	+/–
Nacionalista Party	312,299	40.04	6	–2
PDP–Laban	126,289	16.19	1	+1
Aksyon Demokratiko	48,431	6.21	1	0
Partido Federal ng Pilipinas	45,623	5.85	0	–1
Katipunan ng Nagkakaisang Pilipino	42,989	5.51	1	New
Liberal Party	14,703	1.89	0	New
PROMDI	2,095	0.27	0	New
Independent	187,451	24.04	1	+1
Total	779,880	100.00	10	0
Total votes	101,801	–		
Registered voters/turnout	123,707	82.29		

Candidate	Party	Votes	%
Tata Paulino (incumbent)	Nacionalista Party	54,001	6.92
Rodel Cerezo (incumbent)	Nacionalista Party	49,315	6.32
Kaye Ann Legaspi (incumbent)	Aksyon Demokratiko	48,431	6.21
Jamiel Khonghun Escalona (incumbent)	Nacionalista Party	47,727	6.12
Jerome Michael Bacay (incumbent)	Nacionalista Party	43,702	5.60
Lugie Lipumano (incumbent)	Katipunan ng Nagkakaisang Pilipino	42,989	5.51
Rodolfo Catologan	Nacionalista Party	41,750	5.35
Vic-vic Magsaysay	PDP–Laban	36,243	4.65
Gina Perez	Independent	32,008	4.10
Ying Anonat	Nacionalista Party	31,327	4.02
Donald Aquino	Nacionalista Party	25,900	3.32
Edwin Piano	Partido Federal ng Pilipinas	25,839	3.31
Erma Manalang	Nacionalista Party	18,577	2.38
Dong Galang	Partido Federal ng Pilipinas	15,014	1.93
Cesar Lobos	Independent	14,366	1.84
Claudine Barretto	PDP–Laban	14,362	1.84
Young Elane	Independent	13,892	1.78
JB Saliba	PDP–Laban	13,824	1.77
Iska Villegas	PDP–Laban	12,495	1.60
Michelle Aprid	Independent	12,490	1.60
Joyce Merza	Independent	12,076	1.55
Joe Madria	PDP–Laban	11,149	1.43
Edwin Esposo	Independent	11,016	1.41
Rowel Catigawan	Independent	10,942	1.40
Dante Hondo	Independent	10,421	1.34
Ivan Tanega	Independent	10,052	1.29
Gilbert Piñero	Independent	9,652	1.24
Oliver Guerrero	PDP–Laban	9,038	1.16
Derrick Manuel	PDP–Laban	7,796	1.00
Pocholo Galian	PDP–Laban	7,696	0.99
Tina de Leon	Independent	7,334	0.94
Macky Alonzo	PDP–Laban	7,168	0.92
Dicky Gonzales	Independent	6,888	0.88
Ian Bautista	PDP–Laban	6,518	0.84
Egay Ardiente	Independent	4,806	0.62
Albert Roland Corpuz	Independent	4,215	0.54
Ed Adolfo	Liberal Party	3,652	0.47
Paul Rementilla	Partido Federal ng Pilipinas	2,983	0.38
Brenda Peralta	Liberal Party	2,571	0.33
Lean Oliva	Independent	2,275	0.29
Marvin Suarez	Independent	2,245	0.29
Pining Soberon	Liberal Party	2,201	0.28
Roland dela Rosa	Independent	2,136	0.27
Rico Flores	Independent	2,114	0.27
Romano Diyco	Independent	2,104	0.27
Bhong Tocayon	PROMDI	2,095	0.27
Dolores Grueso	Independent	1,971	0.25
Wilfredo Dayap	Independent	1,960	0.25
Samuel Balintay Jr.	Liberal Party	1,940	0.25
Guy Santos	Partido Federal ng Pilipinas	1,787	0.23
Ricky Basañez	Independent	1,781	0.23
Leng Mapalad	Liberal Party	1,765	0.23
Ferdinand Ramilo	Independent	1,631	0.21
Wency Fernando	Independent	1,630	0.21
Cris Tooley Jr.	Liberal Party	1,604	0.21
Reynan Estrella	Independent	1,582	0.20
Aisiah Tirona	Independent	1,552	0.20
Helen Jose	Independent	1,474	0.19
Regina Bantillo	Independent	1,083	0.14
Hossie Irving	Independent	1,032	0.13
Lyrissa Ordonio	Liberal Party	970	0.12
Lhan Blasqueño	Independent	723	0.09
Total		779,880	100.00
Total votes		101,801	–
Registered voters/turnout		123,707	82.29
Source: Commission on Elections

== Pampanga ==
=== Governor ===
Incumbent Governor Dennis Pineda of the Nationalist People's Coalition ran for a second term.

Pineda won re-election against former Candaba mayor Danilo Baylon (Liberal Party).

Candidate	Party	Votes	%
Dennis Pineda (incumbent)	Nationalist People's Coalition	668,787	58.95
Danilo Baylon	Liberal Party	465,704	41.05
Total		1,134,491	100.00
Total votes		1,201,852	–
Registered voters/turnout		1,374,651	87.43
NPC hold			
Source: Commission on Elections (Note: Total votes and registered voters from Angeles City are excluded as the city's voters are ineligible to vote for provincial officials in Pampanga.)

=== Vice Governor ===
Incumbent Vice Governor Lilia Pineda of Kambilan was re-elected for a second term unopposed.

Candidate	Party	Votes	%
Lilia Pineda (incumbent)	Kambilan	895,160	100.00
Total		895,160	100.00
Total votes		1,201,852	–
Registered voters/turnout		1,374,651	87.43
Kambilan hold			
Source: Commission on Elections

=== Provincial Board ===
The Pampanga Provincial Board is composed of 13 board members, 10 of whom are elected.

Kambilan tied with the Nationalist People's Coalition at four seats each.

Party	Votes	%	Seats	+/–
Kambilan	641,354	32.44	4	–2
Nationalist People's Coalition	477,650	24.16	4	+2
Nacionalista Party	169,416	8.57	1	New
Aksyon Demokratiko	147,591	7.46	1	New
PDP–Laban	108,130	5.47	0	–1
Liberal Party	49,557	2.51	0	–1
Partido Federal ng Pilipinas	39,755	2.01	0	New
PROMDI	9,673	0.49	0	New
Independent	334,052	16.90	0	New
Total	1,977,178	100.00	10	0
Total votes	1,201,852	–		
Registered voters/turnout	1,374,651	87.43		

==== 1st district ====
Pampanga's 1st provincial district consists of the same area as Pampanga's 1st legislative district, excluding Angeles City. Two board members are elected from this provincial district.

Four candidates were included in the ballot.

Candidate	Party	Votes	%
Win-win Garbo	Nationalist People's Coalition	109,369	42.22
Benjamin Jocson (incumbent)	Nationalist People's Coalition	60,338	23.29
Joel Cruz	Liberal Party	49,557	19.13
Dwight Morales	Partido Federal ng Pilipinas	39,755	15.35
Total		259,019	100.00
Total votes		185,032	–
Registered voters/turnout		210,366	87.96
Source: Commission on Elections

==== 2nd district ====
Pampanga's 2nd provincial district consists of the same area as Pampanga's 2nd legislative district. Three board members are elected from this provincial district.

Four candidates were included in the ballot.

Candidate	Party	Votes	%
Mylyn Pineda-Cayabyab (incumbent)	Nationalist People's Coalition	175,951	33.49
Fritzie David-Dizon (incumbent)	Nationalist People's Coalition	131,992	25.12
Sajid Eusoof	Kambilan	125,535	23.89
Dante Torres	Independent	91,934	17.50
Total		525,412	100.00
Total votes		309,051	–
Registered voters/turnout		353,548	87.41
Source: Commission on Elections

==== 3rd district ====
Pampanga's 3rd provincial district consists of the same area as Pampanga's 3rd legislative district. Three board members are elected from this provincial district.

Five candidates were included in the ballot.

Candidate	Party	Votes	%
Mica Gonzales	Kambilan	237,330	30.57
Lucky Labung	Kambilan	154,377	19.88
Jun Canlas (incumbent)	Aksyon Demokratiko	147,591	19.01
Tino Dizon	Independent	129,045	16.62
Kay Pineda	PDP–Laban	108,130	13.93
Total		776,473	100.00
Total votes		384,455	–
Registered voters/turnout		439,078	87.56
Source: Commission on Elections

==== 4th district ====
Pampanga's 4th provincial district consists of the same area as Pampanga's 4th legislative district. Two board members are elected from this provincial district.

Four candidates were included in the ballot.

Candidate	Party	Votes	%
Pol Balingit (incumbent)	Nacionalista Party	169,416	40.70
Nelson Calara (incumbent)	Kambilan	124,112	29.81
Ric Yabut	Independent	113,073	27.16
Edgar Puno	PROMDI	9,673	2.32
Total		416,274	100.00
Total votes		323,314	–
Registered voters/turnout		371,659	86.99
Source: Commission on Elections

== Tarlac ==
=== Governor ===
Incumbent Governor Susan Yap of the Nationalist People's Coalition was re-elected for a third term unopposed.

Candidate	Party	Votes	%
Susan Yap (incumbent)	Nationalist People's Coalition	600,355	100.00
Total		600,355	100.00
Total votes		787,331	–
Registered voters/turnout		898,634	87.61
NPC hold			
Source: Commission on Elections

=== Vice Governor ===
Incumbent Vice Governor Casada David of the Nationalist People's Coalition ran for a third term.

David won re-election against former Tarlac vice governor Marcelino Aganon Jr. (PROMDI).

Candidate	Party	Votes	%
Casada David (incumbent)	Nationalist People's Coalition	443,335	72.19
Marcelino Aganon Jr.	PROMDI	170,796	27.81
Total		614,131	100.00
Total votes		787,331	–
Registered voters/turnout		898,634	87.61
NPC hold			
Source: Commission on Elections

=== Provincial Board ===
The Tarlac Provincial Board is composed of 13 board members, 10 of whom are elected.

The Nationalist People's Coalition won nine seats, maintaining its majority in the provincial board.

Party	Votes	%	Seats	+/–
Nationalist People's Coalition	1,297,028	72.35	9	0
Kilusang Bagong Lipunan	86,694	4.84	0	New
Aksyon Demokratiko	80,156	4.47	0	New
PDP–Laban	54,386	3.03	0	0
Independent	274,378	15.31	1	0
Total	1,792,642	100.00	10	0
Total votes	787,331	–		
Registered voters/turnout	898,634	87.61		

==== 1st district ====
Tarlac's 1st provincial district consists of the same area as Tarlac's 1st legislative district. Three board members are elected from this provincial district.

Five candidates were included in the ballot.

Candidate	Party	Votes	%
Romeo Evangelista (incumbent)	Nationalist People's Coalition	158,353	33.08
Joy Gilbert Lamorena (incumbent)	Nationalist People's Coalition	133,493	27.88
Jessie Aquino (incumbent)	Nationalist People's Coalition	125,000	26.11
Enzo Concepcion	Kilusang Bagong Lipunan	36,971	7.72
Tony Saplaco	Kilusang Bagong Lipunan	24,930	5.21
Total		478,747	100.00
Total votes		246,344	–
Registered voters/turnout		286,133	86.09
Source: Commission on Elections

==== 2nd district ====
Tarlac's 2nd provincial district consists of the same area as Tarlac's 2nd legislative district. Four board members are elected from this provincial district.

Nine candidates were included in the ballot.

Candidate	Party	Votes	%
Dennis Tañedo Go (incumbent)	Independent	146,408	17.82
Topey delos Reyes	Nationalist People's Coalition	140,787	17.13
Dan Canlas Asiaten (incumbent)	Nationalist People's Coalition	139,245	16.94
Harmes Sembrano	Nationalist People's Coalition	133,981	16.30
Tonyboy Cervantes (incumbent)	Nationalist People's Coalition	128,256	15.61
Jojo Briones	Independent	80,717	9.82
Tyrone Aganon	Kilusang Bagong Lipunan	24,793	3.02
Marilou Malvar	PDP–Laban	22,784	2.77
Josefino Doloricon	Independent	4,837	0.59
Total		821,808	100.00
Total votes		292,644	–
Registered voters/turnout		332,594	87.99
Source: Commission on Elections

==== 3rd district ====
Tarlac's 3rd provincial district consists of the same area as Tarlac's 3rd legislative district. Three board members are elected from this provincial district.

Seven candidates were included in the ballot.

Candidate	Party	Votes	%
Tootsie Cruz	Nationalist People's Coalition	132,803	26.99
Vernon Villanueva (incumbent)	Nationalist People's Coalition	110,013	22.36
Danilo David (incumbent)	Nationalist People's Coalition	95,097	19.33
Daisy Francia	Aksyon Demokratiko	42,501	8.64
Alvin Mallari	Independent	42,416	8.62
Cris Perez	Aksyon Demokratiko	37,655	7.65
Benz Pineda	PDP–Laban	31,602	6.42
Total		492,087	100.00
Total votes		248,343	–
Registered voters/turnout		279,907	88.72
Source: Commission on Elections

== Zambales ==
=== Governor ===
Incumbent Governor of Zambales Jun Ebdane of the Sulong Zambales Party ran for a second term. He was previously affiliated with PDP–Laban.

Ebdane won re-election against representative Cheryl Deloso-Montalla (Nationalist People's Coalition) and Min Nuezca (Pederalismo ng Dugong Dakilang Samahan).

Candidate	Party	Votes	%
Hermogenes Ebdane (incumbent)	Sulong Zambales Party	199,874	59.69
Cheryl Deloso-Montalla	Nationalist People's Coalition	133,479	39.86
Min Nuezca	Pederalismo ng Dugong Dakilang Samahan	1,502	0.45
Total		334,855	100.00
Total votes		458,672	–
Registered voters/turnout		540,309	84.89
SZP hold			
Source: Commission on Elections (Note: Total votes and registered voters from Olongapo are excluded as the city's voters are ineligible to vote for provincial officials in Zambales.)

=== Vice Governor ===
Incumbent Vice Governor Jay Khonghun of the Nacionalista Party ran for the House of Representatives in Zambales' 1st legislative district. He was previously affiliated with PDP–Laban.

Khonghun endorsed his sister, Jaq Khonghun (Aksyon Demokratiko), who won the election against former Zambales vice governor Ramon Lacbain II (Independent).

Candidate	Party	Votes	%
Jaq Khonghun	Aksyon Demokratiko	215,668	70.53
Ramon Lacbain II	Independent	90,098	29.47
Total		305,766	100.00
Total votes		458,672	–
Registered voters/turnout		540,309	84.89
Aksyon gain from Nacionalista			
Source: Commission on Elections

=== Provincial Board ===
The Zambales Provincial Board is composed of 14 board members, 10 of whom are elected.

The Sulong Zambales Party won eight seats, gaining a majority in the provincial board.

Party	Votes	%	Seats	+/–
Sulong Zambales Party	693,336	52.27	8	New
Nationalist People's Coalition	348,287	26.26	0	New
Workers' and Peasants' Party	82,536	6.22	1	New
Partido Federal ng Pilipinas	66,414	5.01	1	0
Aksyon Demokratiko	38,264	2.88	0	New
Liberal Party	10,759	0.81	0	–1
People's Reform Party	4,763	0.36	0	New
Independent	82,004	6.18	0	0
Total	1,326,363	100.00	10	0
Total votes	458,672	–		
Registered voters/turnout	540,309	84.89		

==== 1st district ====
Zambales's 1st provincial district consists of the same area as Zambales's 1st legislative district, excluding Olongapo. Three board members are elected from this provincial district.

Six candidates were included in the ballot.

Candidate	Party	Votes	%
King Gutierrez (incumbent)	Sulong Zambales Party	59,125	24.28
John-john Felarca (incumbent)	Sulong Zambales Party	55,870	22.94
Ike Delgado (incumbent)	Sulong Zambales Party	53,156	21.82
Mike Laruta	Nationalist People's Coalition	32,710	13.43
Jason Lacbain	Independent	25,625	10.52
Munding Navarro	Nationalist People's Coalition	17,071	7.01
Total		243,557	100.00
Total votes		106,598	–
Registered voters/turnout		129,912	82.05
Source: Commission on Elections

==== 2nd district ====
Zambales's 2nd provincial district consists of the same area as Zambales's 2nd legislative district. Seven board members are elected from this provincial district.

25 candidates were included in the ballot.

Candidate	Party	Votes	%
Rundy Ebdane	Sulong Zambales Party	118,219	10.92
Reena Mae Collado	Sulong Zambales Party	110,922	10.24
Jun Pangan	Sulong Zambales Party	101,287	9.35
Sam Ablola	Workers' and Peasants' Party	82,536	7.62
Reynaldo Tarongoy (incumbent)	Sulong Zambales Party	70,801	6.54
Sancho Abasta III (incumbent)	Partido Federal ng Pilipinas	66,414	6.13
Lugil Ragadio	Sulong Zambales Party	61,075	5.64
Raedag Villamin Jr.	Nationalist People's Coalition	60,087	5.55
Noel Ferrer	Nationalist People's Coalition	56,064	5.18
Enrico Matibag	Sulong Zambales Party	51,879	4.79
Al Fallorin	Nationalist People's Coalition	51,649	4.77
Saturnino Bactad	Nationalist People's Coalition	48,204	4.45
Doms Diviva	Nationalist People's Coalition	45,177	4.17
Keith Doble	Aksyon Demokratiko	38,264	3.53
Jet Orge	Nationalist People's Coalition	18,801	1.74
Mon Fernandez	Nationalist People's Coalition	18,524	1.71
Boy Misa	Independent	15,139	1.40
Fred Ferranco	Independent	11,480	1.06
Florante Miano	Independent	11,391	1.05
Napoleon Edquid	Sulong Zambales Party	11,002	1.02
Norma Amata	Liberal Party	10,759	0.99
Rolly Rogayan	Independent	6,618	0.61
Maria Remedios Coady	Independent	5,961	0.55
Remzon Adalla	Independent	5,790	0.53
Adlai Enrique Vega	People's Reform Party	4,763	0.44
Total		1,082,806	100.00
Total votes		250,273	–
Registered voters/turnout		286,690	87.30
Source: Commission on Elections
