= 2016 Subic local elections =

Philippine election

← 2013	May 9, 2016	2019 →

Nominee	Jay Khonghun	Rolando Ampunin	Heber Bascon
Party	SZP	PDP–Laban	Independent
Running mate	JB Felarca	Lauro Simbol
Popular vote	36,649	2,962	816
Percentage	90.65%	7.33%	2.01%
Mayor before election
Jay Khonghun
SZP
Elected mayor
Jay Khonghun
SZP

Local elections were held on May 9, 2016 in Subic, Zambales, as part of the Philippine general election. In Subic, the voters elected candidates for the local posts in the municipality: mayor, vice mayor, and eight councilors.

== Background ==
Incumbent Mayor Jay Khonghun is running for his third and last term.

== Candidates ==
=== Mayor ===
Subic Mayoralty Election
Party	Candidate	Votes	%
SZP	Jay Khonghun	36,649	90.65%
PDP–Laban	Rolando Ampunin	2,962	7.33%
Independent	Heber Bascon	816	2.01%
Total votes		40,427	100.00%

=== Vice Mayor ===
Subic Vice Mayoralty Election
Party	Candidate	Votes	%
SZP	JB Felarca	21,526	57.21%
PDP–Laban	Lauro Simbol	16,100	42.79%
Total votes		37,626	100.00%

=== Councilors ===
Sulong Zambales Party/Team Khonghun
Name	Party
Ronnie Dela Cruz	SZP
Roberto Delgado	SZP
Bong Fontelera	SZP
Ochie Huerta	SZP
Emma Quintos	SZP
Zaldy Rocafor	SZP
Ruel Sarmiento	SZP

PDP–Laban/Team Ampunin
Name	Party
Duane Febre	PDP–Laban
Manolo Flores	PDP–Laban
Ruben Gaduang	PDP–Laban
Ariel Panaligan	PDP–Laban
Jowie Timog	PDP–Laban

Subic Council Election
Party	Candidate	Votes	%
SZP	Zaldy Rocafor	26,397	10.56%
SZP	Ruel Sarmiento	23,445	9.38%
SZP	Bong Fontelera	23,362	9.35%
NPC	Elmer Tumaca	23,128	9.26%
SZP	Roberto Delgado	22,552	9.02%
SZP	Emma Quintos	21,345	8.54%
SZP	Ronnie Dela Cruz	20,377	8.15%
SZP	Ochie Huerta	18,677	7.47%
Independent	Orlando Lacbain Jr.	14,106	5.64%
Independent	Roderick Ampunin	9,592	3.84%
PDP–Laban	Ruben Gaduang	9,549	3.82%
PDP–Laban	Manolo Flores	9,111	3.64%
Independent	Alberto Panlilio	6,379	2.55%
PDP–Laban	Ariel Panaligan	5,230	2.09%
Independent	Sars Orozco	5,089	2.03%
PDP–Laban	Jowie Timog	4,978	1.99%
Independent	Richard Estrada	4,233	1.69%
PDP–Laban	Duane Febre	2,197	0.87%
Total votes		249,747	100.00%
