= 2013 Iba local elections =

Philippine election

← 2010	May 13, 2013	2016 →
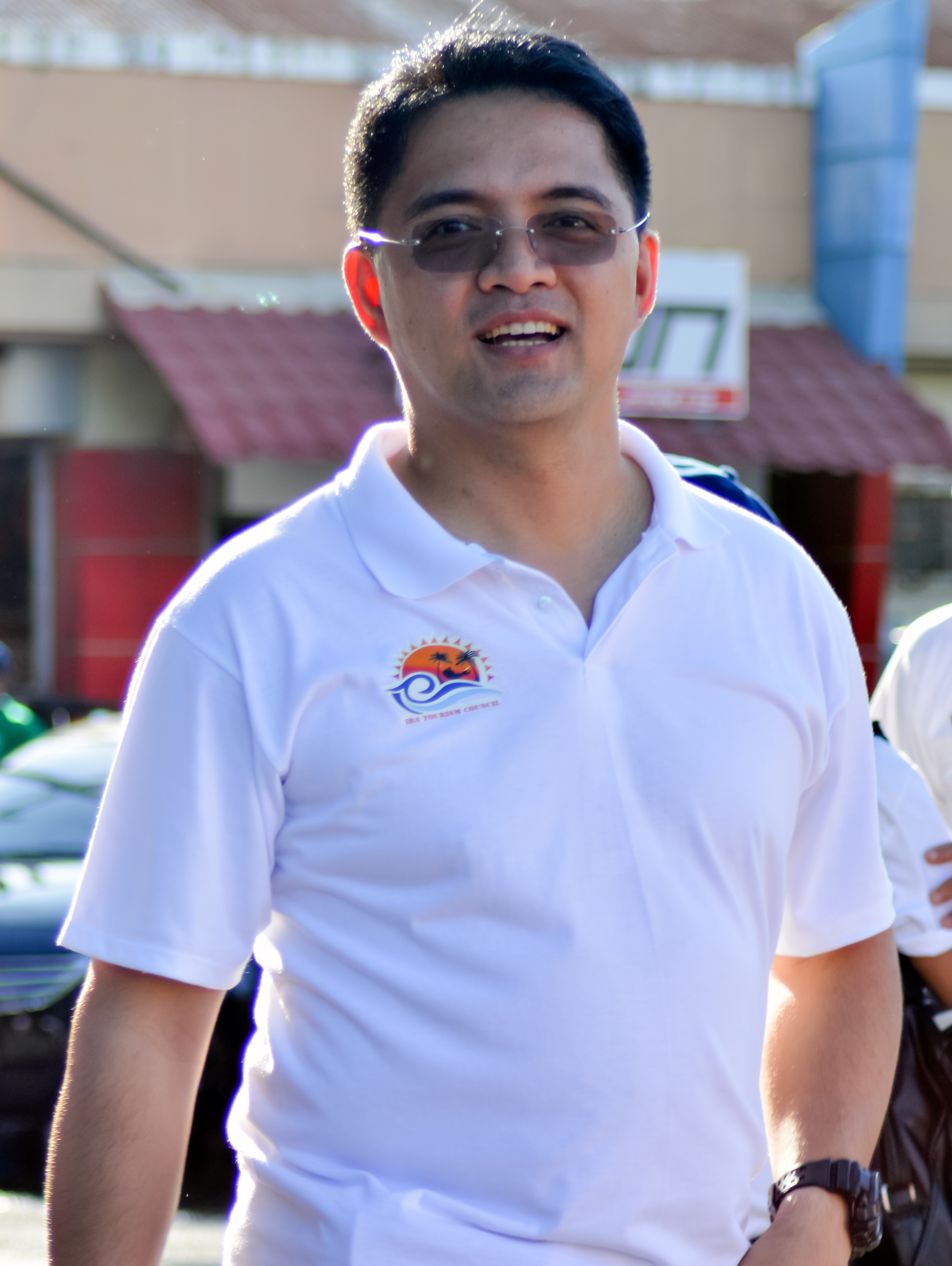

Nominee	Rundstedt Ebdane	Ad Hebert Deloso
Party	SZP	Liberal
Running mate	Isagani Yap	Zaldy Fortin
Popular vote	9,422	7,573
Percentage	52.94	42.55
Nominee	Lydia Mayormita	Victor De Guzman
Party	Independent	Independent
Popular vote	524	280
Percentage	2.94	1.57
Mayor before election
Ad Hebert Deloso
Liberal
Elected mayor
Rundstedt Ebdane
SZP

Local elections were held in Iba, Zambales, on May 13, 2013, within the Philippine general election. The voters elected local posts in the city: the mayor, vice mayor, and eight councilors.

== Results ==
The candidates for mayor and vice mayor with the highest number of votes wins the seat; they are voted separately, therefore, they may be of different parties when elected.

Iba mayoralty election
Party	Candidate	Votes	%
SZP	Rundy Ebdane	9,422	52.94
Liberal	Ad Hebert Deloso	7,573	42.55
Independent	Lydia Mayormita	524	2.94
Independent	Victor De Guzman	280	1.57
Total votes		18,878	100.00

Iba vice mayoralty election
Party	Candidate	Votes	%
Independent	Benjamin Farin Jr.	6,210	29.09
Independent	Danny Pamoleras	4,737	27.47
Liberal	Zaldy Fortin	2,689	15.59
SZP	Isagani Yap	2,462	14.28
Lakas	Pancho Reyes Huang	2,340	13.57
Total votes		17,244	100.00
