= Pancho Reyes Huang =

The Honorable Pancho Reyes Huang

18th Mayor of Iba, Zambales
- In office April 7, 1989 – June 30, 2001
- Preceded by: Oscar Gonzales
- Succeeded by: Danilo Pamoleras

Vice Mayor of Iba, Zambales
- In office July 1, 2007 – June 30, 2010

Personal details
- Born: Pancho Reyes Huang; April 22, 1955 Iba, Zambales, Philippines
- Died: November 4, 2015 (aged 60) Iba, Zambales
- Party: Lakas-NUCD
- Education: Far Eastern University
- Website: Past Mayors

Pancho Reyes Huang (April 22, 1955 – November 4, 2015), was the 18th Mayor of the Municipality of Iba, Zambales. Prior to his appointment as Mayor, he was the elected Vice-Mayor of Iba, Zambales. He was then elected Mayor from 1989 to 2001. He was known for his kindness to people especially the Senior Citizens.

== Death ==
On November 4, 2015, Pancho Reyes Huang found dead in his home at Iba, Zambales.

Political offices
Preceded by Nestor Trinidad	Mayor of Iba, Zambales; 1989 – 2001	Succeeded by Danilo Pamoleras
Preceded by Benjamin Farin Jr.	Vice Mayor of Iba, Zambales; 2007 – 2010	Succeeded by Lydia Mayormita
