= Jun Rundstedt Ebdane =

Filipino politician

The Honorable Jun Rundstedt Ebdane
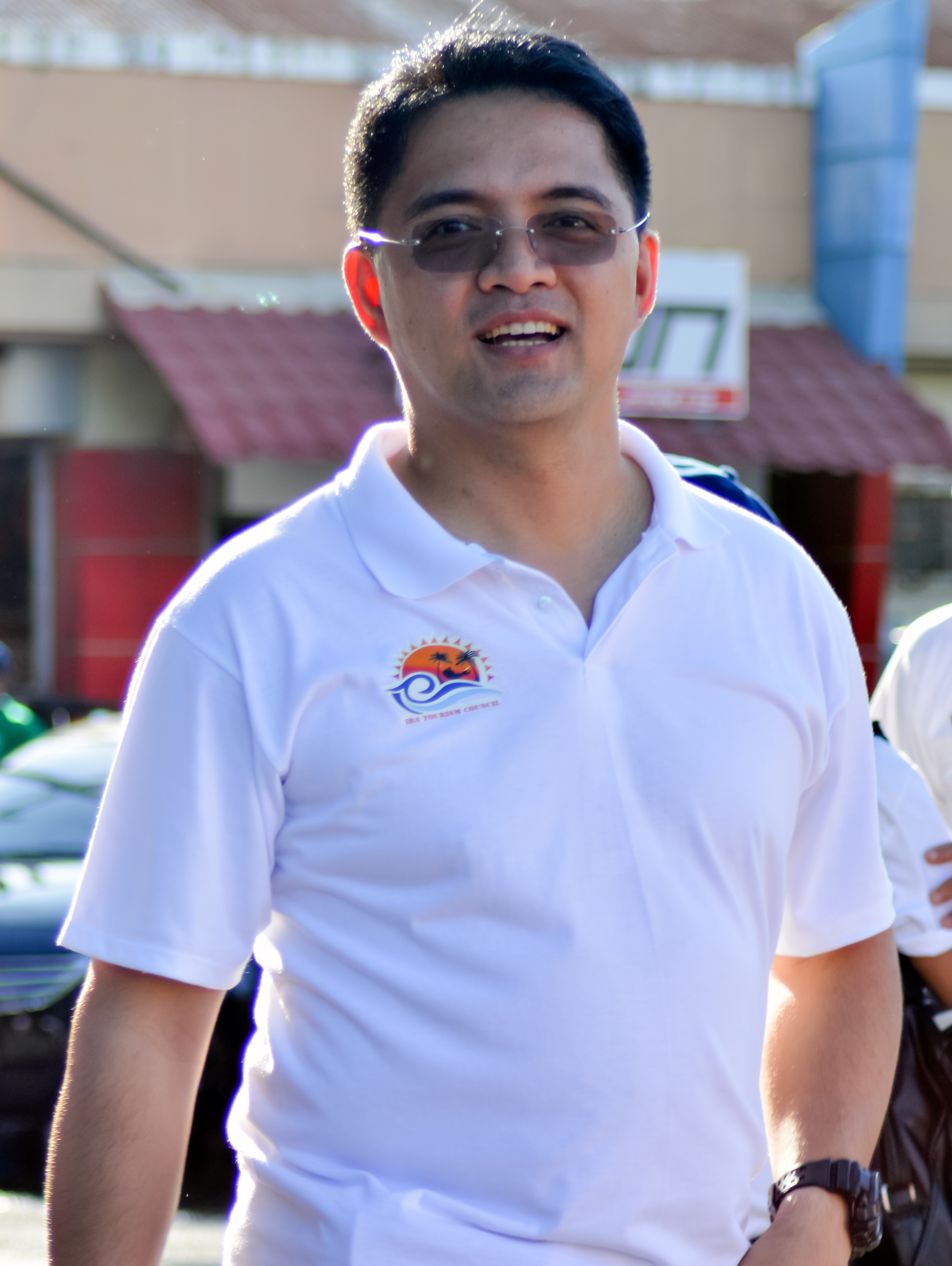
- Ebdane in 2015

Member of the Zambales Provincial Board from the 2nd district
- Incumbent
- Assumed office June 30, 2022

23rd Mayor of Iba, Zambales
- In office June 30, 2013 – June 30, 2022
- Preceded by: Ad Hebert Deloso

Provincial Administrator of Zambales
- In office July 1, 2010 – June 30, 2013
- Preceded by: Jun Omar Ebdane
- Succeeded by: Jun Omar Ebdane

Personal details
- Born: Jun Rundstedt Ebdane; December 30, 1972 (age 53) Tayug, Pangasinan, Philippines
- Party: SZP (2012–present)
- Spouse: Daisy C. Ebdane
- Children: Jun Aron Kristoffe; Micaella Alma Dominique
- Parent: Hermogenes “Jun” Ebdane
- Education: Mapúa Institute of Technology (E.C.E. Graduate)
- Occupation: Politician
- Website: About the Mayor

Jun Rundstedt "Rundy" Cabanayan Ebdane (born December 30, 1972) is a Filipino politician who served as member of Zambales Provincial Board from the 2nd district since 2022. He also served as the 23rd Mayor of Iba, Zambales from 2013 to 2022.

== Education ==
Ebdane is an alumnus of Mapúa Institute of Technology. He also holds a master's degree in Public Administration and completed the Leadership Decision Training at the Kennedy School of Government at Harvard University.

== Political career ==
Prior to his election as Municipal Mayor, he was the Provincial Administrator of the Province of Zambales and was a Police Chief Inspector.

Political offices
| Preceded by Ad Hebert Deloso | Mayor of Iba, Zambales; 2013–2022 | Succeeded by Irenea Maniquiz |
