= Zambales Provincial Board =

Legislative board in the Philippines

Zambales Provincial Board Sangguniang Panlalawigan ng Zambales

Type
- Type: Unicameral
- Term limits: 3 terms (9 years)

Leadership
- Presiding Officer: Jaqueline Rose F. Khonghun, Lakas-CMD since June 30, 2022

Structure
- Seats: 14 board members 1 ex officio presiding officer
- Political groups: SZP (9) NPC (1) Independent (1) Nonpartisan (3)
- Length of term: 3 years
- Authority: Local Government Code of the Philippines

Elections
- Voting system: Multiple non-transferable vote (regular members); Indirect election (ex officio members)
- Last election: May 12, 2025
- Next election: May 15, 2028

Meeting place
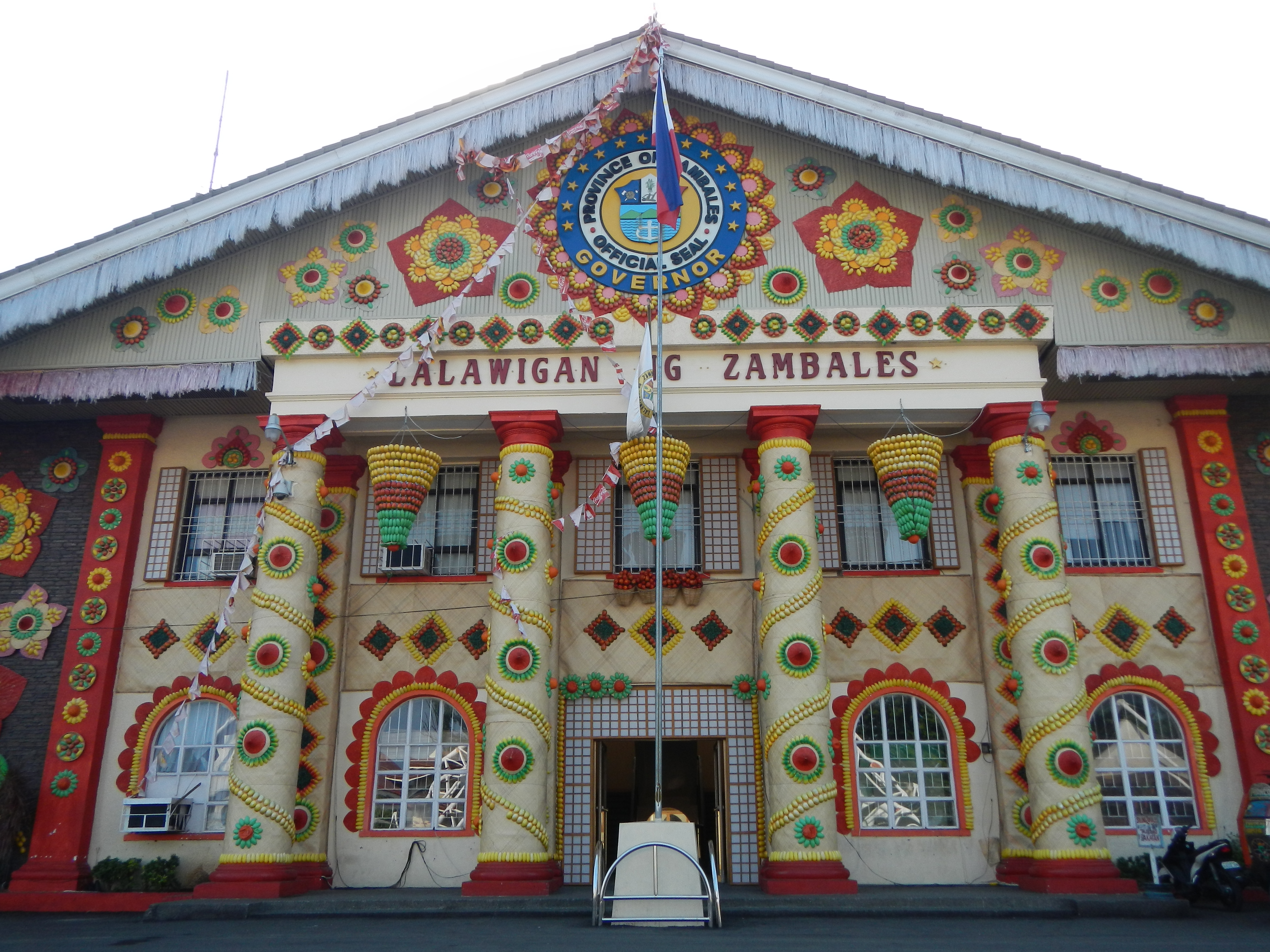
- Zambales Provincial Capitol, Iba

The Zambales Provincial Board is the Sangguniang Panlalawigan (provincial legislature) of the Philippine province of Zambales.

The members are elected via plurality-at-large voting: the province is divided into two districts, the first district sending three members, and the second district sending seven members to the provincial board; the number of candidates the electorate votes for and the number of winning candidates depends on the number of members their district sends. The vice governor is the ex officio presiding officer, and only votes to break ties. The vice governor is elected via the plurality voting system province-wide.

The districts used in appropriation of members is coextensive with the legislative districts of Zambales, with the exception that Olongapo, a highly urbanized city, is excluded in the first district.

Aside from the regular members, the board also includes the provincial federation presidents of the Liga ng mga Barangay (ABC, from its old name "Association of Barangay Captains"), the Sangguniang Kabataan (SK, youth councils) and the Philippine Councilors League (PCL). Zambales's provincial board also has a reserved seat for its indigenous people (IPMR).

== Apportionment ==
Elections	Seats per district		Ex officio seats	Total seats
Elections	1st	2nd	Ex officio seats	Total seats
2010–present	3	7	3	14

== List of members ==
=== Current members ===
These are the members after the 2025 local elections and 2023 barangay and SK elections:

- Vice Governor: Jaqueline Rose F. Khonghun (Lakas)

Seat	Board member	Party	Start of term	End of term
1st district	Maria Cecilia F. Rafanan	SZP	June 30, 2025	June 30, 2028
1st district	Enrique F. Delgado	SZP	June 30, 2019	June 30, 2028
1st district	Elmer S. Tumaca	SZP	June 30, 2025	June 30, 2028
2nd district	Jun Rundstedt C. Ebdane	SZP	June 30, 2022	June 30, 2028
2nd district	Reena Mae L. Collado	SZP	June 30, 2022	June 30, 2028
2nd district	Thea Samantha D. Ablola	SZP	June 30, 2022	June 30, 2028
2nd district	Jury E. Deloso	SZP	June 30, 2019	June 30, 2028
2nd district	Sancho G. Abasta III	SZP	June 30, 2019	June 30, 2028
2nd district	Enrico Matibag	SZP	June 30, 2025	June 30, 2028
2nd district	Noel S. Ferrer	Independent	June 30, 2025	June 30, 2028
ABC	Raedag Villamin Jr.	Nonpartisan	July 30, 2018	January 1, 2023
PCL	Carl Eric B. Rico	SZP	June 30, 2025	June 30, 2028
SK	Daniel John Lachica	Nonpartisan	August 29, 2025	

=== Vice governor ===
Election year	Name	Party	Ref.
2016	Angel Magsaysay	Independent	
2019	Jay Khonghun	PDP–Laban	
2022	Jaqueline Rose F. Khonghun	Aksyon	
2025	Jaqueline Rose F. Khonghun	Lakas	

=== 1st district ===
- Population (2024):

Election year	Member (party)	Member (party)	Member (party)	Ref.
2016	Jonathan John Khonghun (SZP)	Wilfredo Felarca (SZP)	Jose M. Gutierrez, Jr. (SZP)	
2019	Enrique F. Delgado (PDP–Laban)	Wilfredo Felarca (PDP–Laban)	Jose M. Gutierrez, Jr. (PDP–Laban)	
2022	Enrique F. Delgado (SZP)	Wilfredo Felarca (SZP)	Jose M. Gutierrez, Jr. (SZP)	
2025	Enrique F. Delgado (SZP)	Maria Cecilia F. Rafanan (SZP)	Elmer S. Tumaca (SZP)	

=== 2nd district ===
- Population (2024):

Election year	Member (party)	Member (party)	Member (party)	Member (party)	Ref.
2016	Jury E. Deloso (SZP)	Renato H. Collado (SZP)	Samuel Abiola (SZP)	Sancho Abasta, Jr. (SZP)	
2016	Rolex E. Estella (SZP)	Noel S. Ferrer (SZP)	Saturnino V. Bactad (Liberal)	—N/a	
2019	Jury E. Deloso (PFP)	Renato H. Collado (PDP–Laban)	Samuel Abiola (Liberal)	Sancho Abasta, III (PDP–Laban)	
2019	Carolyn S. Fariñas (PDP–Laban)	Reinhart E. Jeresano (PDP–Laban)	Reynaldo C. Tarongoy (PDP–Laban)	—N/a	
2022	Jun Rundstedt Ebdane (SZP)	Reena Mae L. Collado (SZP)	Samuel Abiola (WPP)	Sancho Abasta, III (PFP)	
2022	Jun Pangan (SZP)	Lugil Ragadio (SZP)	Reynaldo C. Tarongoy (SZP)	—N/a	
2025	Jun Rundstedt Ebdane (SZP)	Reena Mae L. Collado (SZP)	Jury E. Deloso (SZP)	Sancho Abasta, III (PFP)	
2025	Jury E. Deloso (SZP)	Thea Samantha D. Ablola (SZP)	Noel S. Ferrer (Independent)	—N/a	
