= 2016 Iba local elections =

Philippine election

- May 9, 2016
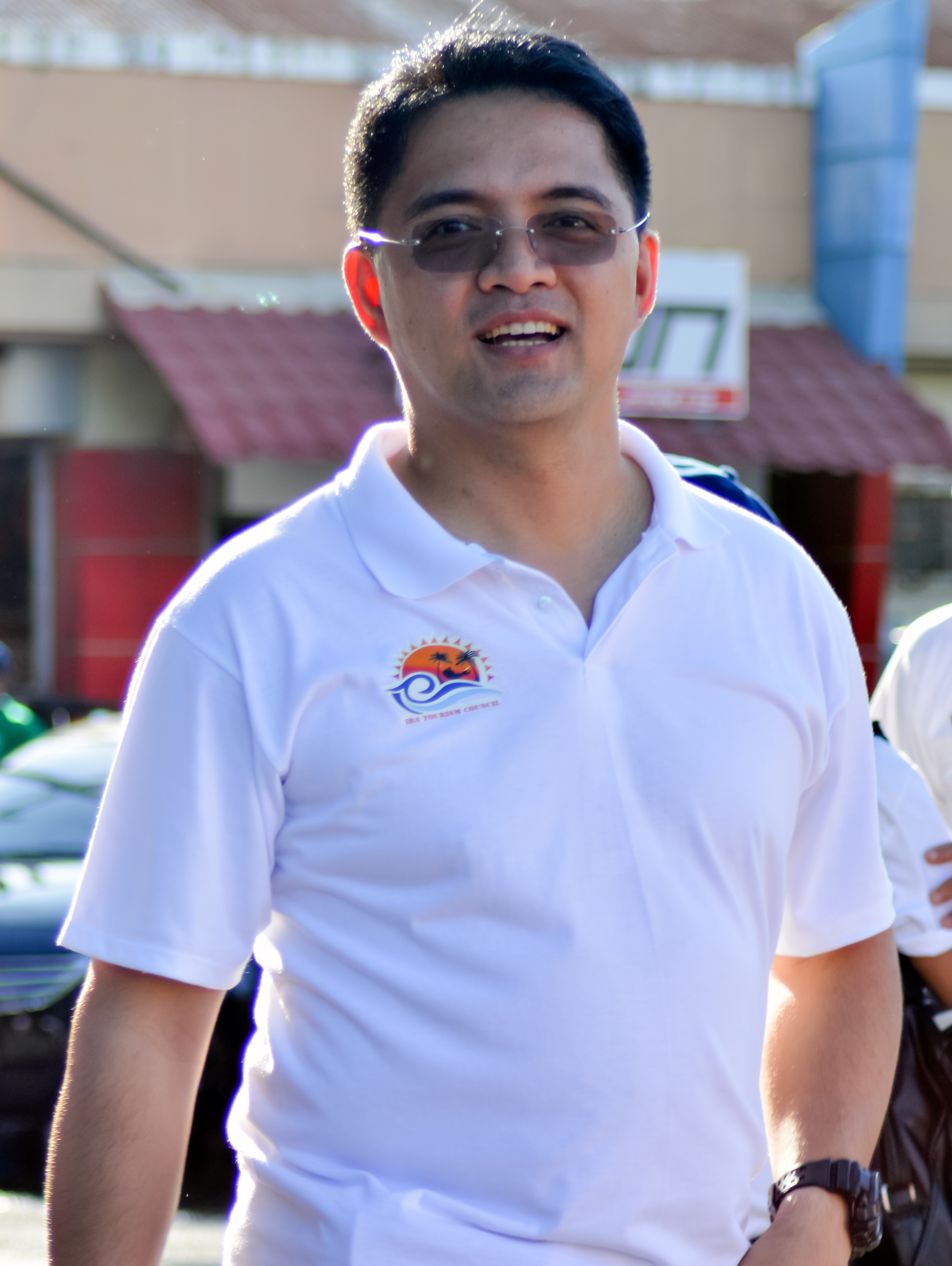

Nominee	Rundstedt Ebdane	Ad Hebert Deloso
Party	SZP	PGP
Running mate	Irene Maniquiz	Virgilio Riberal
Popular vote	13,651	9,543
Percentage	58.85%	41.14%
Mayor before election
Rundstedt Ebdane
SZP
Elected mayor
Rundstedt Ebdane
SZP

Local elections were held in Iba, Zambales on May 9, 2016, within the Philippine general election. The voters elected candidates for the elective local posts in the city: the mayor, vice mayor, and eight councilors.

== Background ==
The incumbent Mayor Rundstedt Jun Ebdane faced former Mayor Ad Hebert Deloso for the mayoralty position. Ebdane teamed up with Irene Maniquiz, cousin of Botolan incumbent Mayor Bing Maniquiz. On the other hand, Deloso teamed up with Virgilio Riberal.

== Candidates ==
=== Mayor ===
Iba Mayoralty Election
Party	Candidate	Votes	%
SZP	Rundstedt Ebdane	13,651	58.86%
PGP	Ad Hebert Deloso	9,543	41.14%
Total votes		23,194	100%

=== Vice Mayor ===
Iba Vice Mayoralty Election
Party	Candidate	Votes	%
SZP	Irene Maniquiz-Biñan	13,750	60.16%
Independent	Benjamin Farin Jr.	6,442	28.18%
PGP	Virgilio Riberal	2,665	11.66%
Total votes		22,857	100%

=== Councilors ===
Partido Galing at Puso/Team Deloso
Name	Party
Renato Abong	PGP
Frank Aldea	PGP
Federico Bacsal	PGP
Ernani Cortez	PGP
Al Fallorin	PGP
Zaldy Fortin	PGP
Senen Pamplona	PGP
Lanie Tabile	PGP

Sulong Zambales Party/Team Ebdane
Name	Party
Ding Aguila	SZP
Danny Ballesteros	SZP
Sixta Bangug	SZP
Lilia Butaran	SZP
Ruben Mauhay	SZP
Robert Millado	SZP
Atty. Gerry Montefalcon	SZP
Badong Redondo	SZP

Iba Council Election
Party	Candidate	Votes	%
PGP	Frank Aldea	10,172	6.76%
SZP	Badong Redondo	9,449	6.28%
SZP	Atty. Gerry Montefalcon	9,416	6.26%
PGP	Al Fallorin	9,386	6.24%
SZP	Danny Ballesteros	7,952	5.28%
SZP	Sixta Bangug	7,678	5.10%
Independent	Gani Yap	7,352	4.88%
PGP	Renato Abong	6,762	4.49%
SZP	Lilia Butaran	6,541	4.34%
PGP	Lanie Tabile	6,319	4.20%
Independent	Ruel Butaran	5,940	3.94%
SZP	Ding Aguila	5,868	3.90%
Independent	Noel Sarmiento	5,836	3.88%
PGP	Federico Bacsal	5,292	3.51%
SZP	Robert Millado	4,959	3.29%
PGP	Zaldy Fortin	4,756	3.16%
PGP	Ernani Cortez	4,591	3.05%
SZP	Ruben Mauhay	4,439	2.95%
Independent	Atanacio Angeles	3,808	2.53%
Independent	Lydia Mayormita	3,790	2.51%
Independent	Ramon Bugarin	3,207	2.13%
Independent	Ceferino Payumo	3,207	2.13%
Independent	Joven Briones	2,794	1.85%
Independent	Nestor Acuavera	2,565	1.70%
Independent	Victor De Guzman	2,317	1.54%
PGP	Senen Pamplona	1,785	1.18%
Independent	Leonardo Angulo Sr.	1,567	1.04%
Independent	Severino Dela Cruz	1,386	0.92%
Independent	Mariano Agrano Jr.	1,262	0.83%
Total votes		150,958	100%
