= Tarlac Provincial Board =

Legislative body of the province of Tarlac, Philippines

Tarlac Provincial Board Sangguniang Panlalawigan ng Tarlac

Type
- Type: Unicameral
- Term limits: 3 terms (9 years)

Leadership
- Presiding Officer: Estelita M. Aquino, NPC since June 30, 2025

Structure
- Seats: 13 board members 1 ex officio presiding officer
- Political groups: NPC (8) PFP (1) Independent (2) Nonpartisan (2)
- Length of term: 3 years
- Authority: Local Government Code of the Philippines

Elections
- Voting system: Multiple non-transferable vote (regular members); Indirect election (ex officio members)
- Last election: May 12, 2025
- Next election: May 15, 2028

Meeting place
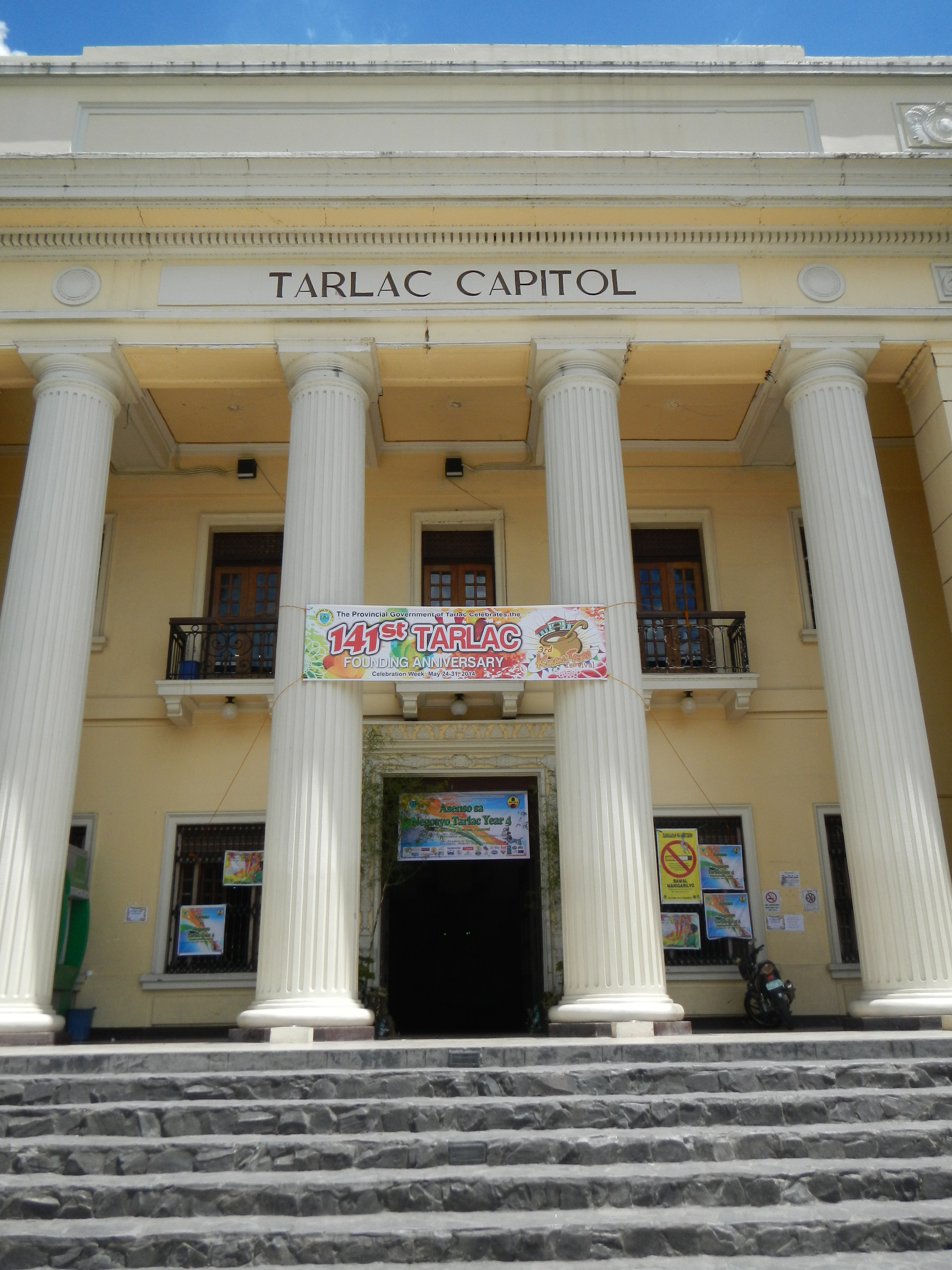
- Tarlac Capitol, Tarlac City

The Tarlac Provincial Board is the Sangguniang Panlalawigan (provincial legislature) of the Philippine province of Tarlac.

The members are elected via plurality-at-large voting: the province is divided into three districts, with the first and third districts sending three members each, while the second district sending four members to the provincial board; the number of candidates the electorate votes for and the number of winning candidates depends on the number of members their district sends. The vice governor is the ex officio presiding officer, and only votes to break ties. The vice governor is elected via the plurality voting system province-wide.

The districts used in appropriation of members is coextensive with the legislative districts of Tarlac.

Aside from the regular members, the board also includes the provincial federation presidents of the Liga ng mga Barangay (ABC, from its old name "Association of Barangay Captains"), the Sangguniang Kabataan (SK, youth councils) and the Philippine Councilors League (PCL).

== Apportionment ==
Elections	Seats per district			Ex officio seats	Total seats
Elections	1st	2nd	3rd	Ex officio seats	Total seats
2010-2019	3	4	3	3	13

== List of members ==
=== Current members ===
These are the members after the 2025 local elections and 2023 barangay and SK elections:

- Vice Governor: Estelita M. Aquino (NPC)

Seat	Board member	Party	Start of term	End of term
1st district	Pearl Angeli E. Pacada	NPC	June 30, 2025	June 30, 2028
1st district	Joy Gilbert R. Lamorena	NPC	June 30, 2019	June 30, 2028
1st district	Agustito L. Roxas	NPC	June 30, 2025	June 30, 2028
2nd district	Harmes S. Sembrano	NPC	June 30, 2022	June 30, 2028
2nd district	Dennis Norman T. Go	Independent	June 30, 2019	June 30, 2028
2nd district	Christopher C. Delos Reyes	Independent	June 30, 2022	June 30, 2028
2nd district	Arron Villaflor	PFP	June 30, 2025	June 30, 2028
3rd district	Henry P. Cruz	NPC	June 30, 2022	June 30, 2028
3rd district	Carlito S. David	NPC	June 30, 2025	June 30, 2028
3rd district	Antonio L. Villanueva	NPC	June 30, 2025	June 30, 2028
ABC	Joselito Capitulo	Nonpartisan	July 30, 2018	January 1, 2023
PCL	Emilio "Mico" Yap Macasaet	NPC	July 1, 2025	June 30, 2028
SK	Christine Dizon	Nonpartisan	June 8, 2018	January 1, 2023

=== Vice governor ===
Election year	Name	Party	Ref.
2016	Casada S. David	NPC	
2019	Casada S. David	NPC	
2022	Casada S. David	NPC	
2025	Estelita M. Aquino	NPC	

=== 1st district ===
- Population (2024):

Election year	Member (party)	Member (party)	Member (party)	Ref.
2016	Jessie E. Aquino (NPC)	Romeo A. Evangelista (NPC)	John Patrick R. Agustin (NPC)	
2019	Jessie E. Aquino (NPC)	Romeo A. Evangelista (NPC)	Joy Gilbert R. Lamorena (NPC)	
2022	Jessie E. Aquino (NPC)	Romeo A. Evangelista (NPC)	Joy Gilbert R. Lamorena (NPC)	
2025	Pearl Angeli E. Pacada (NPC)	Agustito L. Roxas (NPC)	Joy Gilbert R. Lamorena (NPC)	

=== 2nd district ===
- Population (2024):

Election year	Member (party)	Member (party)	Member (party)	Member (party)	Ref.
2016	Enrico J. De Leon (Liberal)	Jude Joseph David (Liberal)	Antonio Cervantes (Liberal)	Harmes S. Sembrano (Nacionalista)	
2019	Dennis Norman T. Go (NPC)	Jude Joseph David (NPC)	Antonio Cervantes (NPC)	Danilo C. Asiaten (Independent)	
2022	Dennis Norman T. Go (Independent)	Christopher C. delos Reyes (NPC)	Harmes S. Sembrano (NPC)	Danilo C. Asiaten (NPC)	
2025	Dennis Norman T. Go (Independent)	Christopher C. delos Reyes (Independent)	Harmes S. Sembrano (NPC)	Arron Villaflor (PFP)	

=== 3rd district ===
- Population (2024):

Election year	Member (party)	Member (party)	Member (party)	Ref.
2016	Henry T. Cruz (NPC)	Vernon L. Villanueva (NPC)	Saturnino Mandal (NPC)	
2019	Danilo D. David (NPC)	Vernon L. Villanueva (NPC)	Saturnino Mandal (NPC)	
2022	Henry P. Cruz (NPC)	Vernon L. Villanueva (NPC)	Saturnino Mandal (NPC)	
2025	Henry P. Cruz (NPC)	Carlito S. David (NPC)	Antonio L. Villanueva (NPC)	
