= Sulong Zambales Party =

Political party in the Philippines

- President: Jun Omar Ebdane
- Chairman: Hermogenes Ebdane
- Secretary-General: Ramon Lacbain II
- Founded: 2012
- Headquarters: Candelaria, Zambales
- Ideology: Regionalism; Populism
- National affiliation: PFP (2023-present); PDP–Laban (2018–2023); Liberal (2016); Labor (2012–2016)
- Colors: Red
- Slogan: Sulong Zambales, Aarangkada Zambaleño (Forward Zambales, Get things going Zambaleño)
- House of Representatives: 2 / 2 (Zambales seats only)
- Provincial governors: 1 / 1 (Zambales seats only)
- Provincial vice governors: 1 / 1 (Zambales seats only)
- Provincial board members: 8 / 10 (Zambales seats only)

Sulong Zambales Party is the ruling political party in Zambales, Philippines, founded by incumbent Zambales Governor Hermogenes Ebdane in 2012.

== Liberal Party Endorsement ==
On April 5, 2016, President Benigno Aquino III and Liberal Party standard bearer Mar Roxas officially endorsed Zambales Governor Hermogenes Ebdane and the whole Sulong Zambales Party slate except for 2nd district representative which they support Cheryl Deloso.

== Officers ==
- Jun Omar Ebdane - Incumbent Sulong Zambales Party President, former Zambales Representative, 2nd District (2011-2013)
- Hermogenes Ebdane - Incumbent Sulong Zambales Party Chairman, Elected Governor of Zambales (2010 – present)
- Jeffrey Khonghun (Nationalist People's Coalition) - Vice Chairman (1st District, Zambales), Incumbent Representative (1st District, Zambales)
- Jessu Edora - Vice Chairman (2nd District, Zambales), former mayor of Masinloc, Zambales
- Ramon Lacbain II - Secretary-General, Incumbent Vice-Governor (Province of Zambales) (2001 – 2007; 2010 – present)

== Other notable members ==
- Jun Rundstedt Ebdane - Iba, Zambales Municipal Mayor (2013–present)
- Bing Ecdao Maniquiz - Botolan, Zambales Municipal Mayor (2013–present)
- Aireen Maniquiz Binan - Iba, Zambales Municipal Vice Mayor (2016–present)
- Jay Khonghun (Nationalist People's Coalition) - Municipal Mayor (Subic)
- Connie Marty - Municipal Mayor (Sta. Cruz)
- Luisito Marty - Former Sta. Cruz, Zambales Mayor, wife of incumbent Mayor Connie Marty, official candidate of Sulong Zambales for Mayor
- Jose Rodriguez - Municipal Mayor (San Marcelino)
- Ronaldo Apostol - Municipal Mayor (Cabangan)
- Napoleon Edquid - Municipal Mayor (Candelaria)
- Desiree Edora - Municipal Mayor (Masinloc)
- Generoso Amog - Municipal Mayor (Palauig)
- Carolyn Fariñas - Municipal Mayor (San Felipe)
- Peter Lim - Municipal Mayor (San Narciso)
- Renato Collado
- Samuel Ablola
- Sancho Abasta Jr.
- Porfirio Elamparo
- Jesse Mendigorin
- Jean Morana
- Roberto Blanco

== 2016 Election Candidates ==
- Hermogenes Ebdane Jr. – Governor, Zambales
- Ramon Lacbain II – Vice-Governor, Zambales

=== 1st District (Zambales) ===
- Jeffrey Khonghun – Representative, 1st District of Zambales
- John John Felarca – Board Member 1st District of Zambales
- Jose Guttierez Jr. – Board Member 1st District of Zambales
- Jon Khonghun – Board Member 1st District of Zambales
- Jay Khonghun – Mayor, Subic, Zambales
- Jose Angelo Dominguez – Mayor, Castillejos
- Jose Rodriguez Jr. – Mayor, San Marcelino, Zambales

=== 2nd District (Zambales) ===
- Reinhard Jeresano – Representative, 2nd District of Zambales
- Sancho Abasta Jr. – Board Member, 2nd District of Zambales
- Sam Ablola – Board Member, 2nd District of Zambales
- Renato Collado – Board Member, 2nd District of Zambales
- Jury Deloso – Board Member, 2nd District of Zambales
- Rolex Estella – Board Member, 2nd District of Zambales
- Noel Ferrer – Board Member, 2nd District of Zambales
- Romelino Gojo – Board Member, 2nd District of Zambales
- Estela Deloso-Antipolo – Mayor, San Antonio, Zambales
- Peter Lim – Mayor, San Narciso, Zambales
- Carolyn Fariñas – Mayor, San Felipe
- Joy Apostol – Mayor, Cabangan, Zambales
- Bing Maniquiz – Mayor, Botolan, Zambales
- Rundstedt Ebdane – Mayor, Iba, Zambales
- Chito Marty - Mayor, Santa Cruz, Zambales
