= 2019 Philippine gubernatorial elections =

- May 13, 2019

All 81 provincial governorships
	First party	Second party	Third party
Party	PDP–Laban	Nacionalista	Liberal
Last election	0	9	39
Seats before	32	9	6
Seats after	41	8	2
Seat change	▲9	▼1	▼4
	Fourth party	Fifth party	Sixth party
Party	NUP	NPC	UNA
Last election	9	9	3
Seats before	6	5	1
Seats after	8	7	1
Seat change	▲2	▲2	Steady
- Results of the election
President of the League of Provinces of the Philippines before election
Ryan Luis Singson (Ilocos Sur)
Nacionalista
Elected President of the League of Provinces of the Philippines
Presbitero Velasco (Marinduque)
PDP–Laban

Gubernatorial elections were held in the Philippines on May 13, 2019. All provinces elected their provincial governors for three-year terms, who will be inaugurated on June 30, 2019 after their proclamation. Governors that are currently serving their third consecutive terms are prohibited from running as governors (they may run for any other posts however).

Metro Manila and Highly urbanized cities and independent component cities such as Angeles City, Cebu City and Davao City are outside the jurisdiction of any province and thus do not run elections for governors of their mother provinces (Pampanga, Cebu and Davao del Sur respectively). These shall elect mayors instead.

== Summary ==
Party	2016 elections	Before elections	Gains	Holds	Losses	Total	%	Change (vs. before)
PDP–Laban	0	40	4	35	5	39	48.1%	▼1
NPC	13	8	1	8	0	9	11.1%	▲1
NUP	8	9	2	7	2	9	11.1%	Steady
Nacionalista	6	8	2	7	1	9	11.1%	▲1
UNA	3	4	2	1	2	3	3.7%	▼1
Liberal	39	6	2	4	35	2	2.4%	▼35
Aksyon	0	1	0	1	0	1	1.2%	Steady
Lakas	1	1	0	0	1	0	0.0%	▼1
Local parties	4	7	0	6	1	6	7.4%	▼1
Independent	6	2	3	2	0	5	6.2%	▲3
Totals	80	80	14	67	13	81	100%	▲1

Party	Votes	%	Governors	+/–
PDP–Laban	12,264,699	37.0	40	+40
Nationalist People's Coalition	5,023,825	15.2	7	–1
Nacionalista Party	4,233,810	12.8	8	0
National Unity Party	2,313,904	7.0	8	–1
Lakas	1,574,602	4.8	2	+2
Partido Federal ng Pilipinas	1,203,096	3.6	1	New
Liberal Party	970,313	2.9	2	–39
Hugpong ng Pagbabago	892,847	2.7	3	New
Unang Sigaw	477,066	1.4	1	New
Bukidnon Paglaum	440,132	1.3	1	0
Bileg	290,140	0.9	1	New
Pederalismo ng Dugong Dakilang Samahan	280,827	0.8	1	New
Partidong Pagbabago ng Palawan	207,875	0.6	1	New
United Nationalist Alliance	182,924	0.6	1	–4
Malayang Kilusan ng Mamamayang Zambaleño	128,692	0.4	0	New
Partido Demokratiko Sosyalista ng Pilipinas	109,873	0.3	0	New
Asenso Abrenio	105,540	0.3	1	New
Laban ng Demokratikong Pilipino	41,195	0.1	0	0
Bagumbayan–VNP	29,039	0.1	0	New
Katipunan ng Demokratikong Pilipino	26,587	0.1	0	New
Partido ng Manggagawa at Magsasaka	19,903	0.1	0	New
Partido ng Manggagawa	14,378	0.0	0	New
Philippine Green Republican Party	8,579	0.0	0	New
People's Consultative Party	6,491	0.0	0	New
Kapayapaan, Kaunlaran at Katarungan	3,108	0.0	0	New
Kilusang Bagong Lipunan	1,314	0.0	0	0
Aksyon Demokratiko	183	0.0	0	–1
Independents	2,256,006	6.8	3	0
Invalid/blank votes	5,102,229	–	–	–
Total	38,209,177	100	81	–
Registered voters/turnout	49,466,536	77.2	–	–

== Luzon ==
Here are the election results as provided by the Commission on Elections (COMELEC) for the provinces in Luzon.

=== Ilocos Region ===
==== Ilocos Norte ====
Incumbent Governor Imee Marcos is term-limited and is running for Senator. Her mother, former First Lady and incumbent congresswoman Imelda Marcos, is running in her place. On November 29, she withdrew her bid and was replaced by her grandson, Matthew Joseph Manotoc. His opponent is former governor and incumbent congressman Rodolfo Fariñas. On May 2, Fariñas withdrew from the race, leaving Manotoc running unopposed.

Ilocos Norte (Note: Incumbent governor Imee Marcos is term-limited and is running for Senator. Her mother, former First Lady and incumbent congresswoman Imelda Marcos is running in her place. On November 29, she withdrew her bid and replaced by her grandson, Matthew Joseph Manotoc. On May 2, Rodolfo Fariñas withdrew from the race which leads Manotoc running unopposed.) gubernatorial election
Party	Candidate	Votes	%
Nacionalista	Matthew Joseph M. Manotoc	260,938	90.01
PDP–Laban	Rodolfo Fariñas (withdrew)	28,992	9.99
Total votes		289,930	100.00
Nacionalista hold			

==== Ilocos Sur ====
Incumbent Governor Ryan Luis Singson is running for reelection.

Ilocos Sur gubernatorial election
Party	Candidate	Votes	%
Bileg	Ryan Luis Singson (Incumbent)	290,140	82.44
PDP–Laban	Zuriel Zaragoza	61,777	17.56
Total votes		351,917	100.00

==== La Union ====
La Union gubernatorial election
Party	Candidate	Votes	%
PDP–Laban	Francisco Emmanuel Ortega III (Incumbent)	334,366	91.74
KDP	Fernando Dumpit, Jr.	26,587	7.30
Independent	Clark Field Arroño III	3,550	0.96
Total votes		364,503	100.00

==== Pangasinan ====
Incumbent Governor Amado Espino III is running for reelection.

Pangasinan gubernatorial election
Party	Candidate	Votes	%
PDP–Laban	Amado Espino III (Incumbent)	782,073	57.30
Nacionalista	Arthur Celeste	582,872	42.70
Total votes		1,364,945	100.00

=== Cagayan Valley ===
==== Batanes ====
Incumbent Governor Marilou Cayco is running for reelection.

Batanes gubernatorial election
Party	Candidate	Votes	%
Liberal	Marilou Cayco (Incumbent)	5,753	61.86
NPC	Telesforo Castillejos	3,547	38.14
Total votes		9,300	100.00

==== Cagayan ====
Incumbent Governor Manuel Mamba is running for reelection.

Cagayan gubernatorial election
Party	Candidate	Votes	%
Independent	Manuel Mamba (Incumbent)	256,103	49.57
NUP	Randolph Ting	168,170	32.55
UNA	Alvaro Antonio	92,350	17.88
Total votes		516,623	100.00

==== Isabela ====
Incumbent Governor Faustino Dy III is term-limited.

Isabela (Note: Incumbent governor Faustino Dy III is term-limited and is running for Vice Governor.) gubernatorial election
Party	Candidate	Votes	%
PDP–Laban	Rodito Albano	582,571	96.42
Independent	Antonio Aliangan	21,613	3.58
Total votes		604,184	100.00

==== Nueva Vizcaya ====
Incumbent Governor Carlos Padilla is running for reelection.

Nueva Vizcaya gubernatorial election
Party	Candidate	Votes	%
Nacionalista	Carlos Padilla (Incumbent)	115,367	58.03
NUP	Jose Gambito	81,475	40.98
PDDS	Ronald Sioco	1,969	0.99
Total votes		198,811	100.00
Nacionalista hold			

==== Quirino ====
Incumbent governor Junie Cua is term limited.

Quirino (Note: Incumbent governor Junie Cua is term-limited and is running for congressman. His son, incumbent congressman Dakila Carlo Cua is running in his place.) gubernatorial election
Party	Candidate	Votes	%
PDP–Laban	Dakila Carlo Cua	76,254	100.00
Total votes		76,254	100.00
PDP–Laban hold			

=== Cordillera Administrative Region ===
==== Abra ====
Incumbent Governor Ma. Jocelyn Bernos is running for reelection.

Abra gubernatorial election
Party	Candidate	Votes	%
Asenso	Maria Jocelyn Bernos (Incumbent)	105,540	75.67
PDP–Laban	Robert Victor Seares, Jr.	33,926	24.33
Total votes		139,466	100.00

==== Apayao ====
Incumbent governor Elias Bulut Jr. is term limited and is running for congressman. His sister, incumbent congresswoman Eleonor Bulut Begtang is running in his place unopposed.

Apayao (Note: Incumbent governor Elias Bulut, Jr. is term-limited and is running for congressman. His sister, incumbent congresswoman Eleonor Bulut-Begtang is running in his place.) gubernatorial election
Party	Candidate	Votes	%
PDP–Laban	Eleonor Bulut Begtang	45,343	100.00
Total votes		45,343	100.00
PDP–Laban hold			

==== Benguet ====
Incumbent Cresencio Pacalso is running for reelection.

Benguet gubernatorial election
Party	Candidate	Votes	%
PDP–Laban	Melchor Diclas	98,745	59.05
Independent	Cresencio Pacalso (Incumbent)	67,238	40.21
Independent	Alexander Tadina	1,230	0.74
Total votes		167,213	100.00
PDP–Laban gain from Independent			

==== Ifugao ====
Incumbent Pedro Mayam-O is not running.

Ifugao (Note: Incumbent governor Pedro Mayam-O is running for congressman.) gubernatorial election
Party	Candidate	Votes	%
NUP	Jerry Dalipog	36,183	38.14
Liberal	Teddy Baguilat	30,803	32.47
PDP–Laban	Jose Gullitiw	27,887	29.39
Total votes		94,873	100.00
NUP gain from Liberal			

==== Kalinga ====
Incumbent Jocel Baac is term-limited and is running for congressman.

Kalinga (Note: Incumbent governor Jocel Baac is term-limited and is running for congressman.) gubernatorial election
Party	Candidate	Votes	%
PDP–Laban	Ferdinand Tubban	39,148	35.79
Lakas	James Edduba	39,138	35.78
PFP	Conrado Dieza, Jr.	30,685	28.05
Independent	Loreto Banosan	424	0.38
Total votes		109,395	100.00
PDP–Laban gain from Liberal			

==== Mountain Province ====
Incumbent Bonifacio Lacwasan assumed as Governor after the Commission on Elections nullifies the proclamation of Kathy Jill Mayaen. The COMELEC disqualifies Mayaen as substitute candidate of Leonardo Mayaen who died on March 31, 2016. According to COMELEC rules, any independent candidate cannot be substituted in case of death, withdrawal or disqualification.

Mountain Province gubernatorial election
Party	Candidate	Votes	%
PDP–Laban	Bonifacio Lacwasan (Incumbent)	31,908	39.99
Independent	Eduardo Latawan, Jr.	25,010	31.35
Liberal	Mateo Chiyawan	20,185	25.30
Independent	Harry Dominguez	2,343	2.94
Aksyon	Antonio Grupo, Jr.	183	0.23
PDDS	Magine Limliman	153	0.19
Total votes		79,782	100.00
PDP–Laban hold			

=== Central Luzon ===
==== Aurora ====
Incumbent Gerardo Noveras is running for reelection.

Aurora gubernatorial election
Party	Candidate	Votes	%
NPC	Gerardo Noveras (Incumbent)	60,526	59.50
LDP	Ariel Bitong	41,195	40.50
Total votes		101,721	100.00
NPC hold			

==== Bataan ====
Incumbent Albert Garcia is running for reelection.

Bataan gubernatorial election
Party	Candidate	Votes	%
NUP	Albert Garcia (Incumbent)	290,107	72.01
PFP	Lilver Roque	112,745	27.99
Total votes		402,852	100.00
NUP hold			

==== Bulacan ====
Bulacan (Note: Incumbent governor Wilhelmino Sy-Alvarado is term-limited and is running for Vice Governor) Gubernatorial Election
Party	Candidate	Votes	%
NUP	Daniel Fernando	706,903	54.38
PDP–Laban	Christian Agila Natividad	406,366	31.26
Lakas	Aguila Teddy Natividad	159,371	12.26
Independent	Joel Coronel	8,401	0.65
Independent	Kuya Jay Ocampo	5,919	0.46
Independent	Ermalyn G. del Carmen	4,852	0.37
LM	Larry dela Merced	4,582	0.35
Independent	Kaka Balite	3,596	0.28
Total votes		1,299,990	100.00
NUP hold			

==== Nueva Ecija ====
Incumbent governor Czarina Umali is not running. Her brother-in-law, Gil Raymond is running in her place. On November 23, he withdrew his bid and replaced by his brother, former Governor Aurelio Umali.

Nueva Ecija (Note: Incumbent governor Czarina Umali is not running. Her nephew, Gil Raymond is running in her place. On November 23, he withdrew his bid and replaced by his brother, Aurelio.) gubernatorial election
Party	Candidate	Votes	%
Unang Sigaw	Aurelio Umali	477,066	51.58
PDP–Laban	Virgilio Bote	337,925	36.54
Independent	Eduardo Nonato Joson	94,639	10.23
PDDS	Renato Reynaldo Maliwat	7,313	0.79
PFP	Roberto Gavina	4,776	0.52
Independent	Constantino De Leon	3,117	0.34
Total votes		924,836	100.00

==== Pampanga ====
Incumbent governor Lilia Pineda is term-limited and is running for Vice Governor. Her son, incumbent Vice Governor Dennis Pineda is running in her place.

Pampanga (Note: Incumbent governor Lilia Pineda is term-limited and is running for Vice Governor. Her son incumbent Vice Governor Dennis Pineda is running in her place.) gubernatorial election
Party	Candidate	Votes	%
NPC	Dennis Pineda	657,606	73.25
Independent	Jomar Hizon	229,392	25.55
Independent	James Escoto	5,783	0.65
Independent	Amado Santos	4,957	0.55
Total votes		897,738	100.00
NPC hold			

==== Tarlac ====
Incumbent Susan Yap is running for reelection unopposed.

Tarlac gubernatorial election
Party	Candidate	Votes	%
NPC	Susan Yap (Incumbent)	534,122	100.00
Total votes		534,122	100.00
NPC hold			

==== Zambales ====
Incumbent Amor Deloso is running for reelection against former governor Hermogenes Ebdane.

Zambales gubernatorial election
Party	Candidate	Votes	%
PDP–Laban	Hermogenes Ebdane	151,667	54.10
MAKIMAZA	Amor Deloso (Incumbent)	128,692	45.90
Total votes		280,359	100.00
PDP–Laban gain from MAKIMAZA			

=== Calabarzon ===
==== Batangas ====
Incumbent Governor Hermilando Mandanas is running for reelection.

Batangas gubernatorial election
Party	Candidate	Votes	%
PDP–Laban	Hermilando Mandanas (Incumbent)	1,078,447	96.58
Independent	Johnifer Gutierrez	28,549	2.56
Independent	Danilo Guste	9,656	0.86
Total votes		1,116,652	100.00
PDP–Laban hold			

==== Cavite ====
Incumbent Governor Jesus Crispin Remulla will not run for reelection.

Cavite (Note: Incumbent governor Jesus Crispin Remulla is running for congressman. His brother, former Governor Juanito Victor Remulla is running in his place.) gubernatorial election
Party	Candidate	Votes	%
Nacionalista	Juanito Victor Remulla, Jr.	825,485	61.70
Liberal	Erineo Maliksi	495,288	37.02
Independent	Roberto Boral	8,764	0.66
Independent	Gerbie Ber Ado	8,277	0.62
Total votes		1,337,754	100.00
Nacionalista hold			

==== Laguna ====
Incumbent Ramil Hernandez is running for reelection, while his predecessor ER Ejercito, was formally disqualified owing to the decision on his corruption case.

Laguna Gubernatorial Election
Party	Candidate	Votes	%
PDP–Laban	Ramil Hernandez (Incumbent)	817,250	66.55
PFP	Emilio Ramon Ejercito	391,270	31.86
Independent	Berlene Alberto	7,414	0.60
PDDS	Lope Grajera	4,362	0.36
Independent	Leonardo Almadrigo	4,063	0.33
Independent	Manolo Samia	3,652	0.30
Total votes		1,228,011	100.00
PDP–Laban hold			

==== Quezon ====
Quezon (Note: Incumbent governor David Suarez is term-limited and is running for congressman. His father incumbent congressman Danilo Suarez is running in his place.) gubernatorial election
Party	Candidate	Votes	%
Lakas	Danilo Suarez	588,929	67.53
Independent	Vicente Alcala	249,750	28.64
Independent	Serafin Dator	14,849	1.70
Independent	Sonny Pulgar	8,240	0.94
PDP–Laban	Dominador Villena, Jr.	6,068	0.70
PFP	Benilda Fatima Abuy	4,258	0.49
Total votes		872,094	100.00
Lakas hold			

==== Rizal ====
Incumbent Governor Rebecca A. Ynares is running for reelection.

Rizal gubernatorial election
Party	Candidate	Votes	%
NPC	Rebecca A. Ynares (Incumbent)	811,680	90.18
Independent	Jose Velasco	53,640	5.96
Independent	Marc Lester Trinidad	34,769	3.86
Total votes		900,089	100.00
NPC hold			

=== Mimaropa ===
==== Marinduque ====
Marinduque (Note: Romulo Bacorro assumed office after the death of Governor Carmencita Reyes is instead running for Vice Governor. On May 3, Violet Reyes withdrew from the race) gubernatorial election
Party	Candidate	Votes	%
PDP–Laban	Presbitero Velasco, Jr.	66,526	62.83
Independent	Reynaldo Salvacion	34,347	32.44
UNA	Violet Reyes (withdrew)	5,015	4.73
Total votes		105,888	100.00
PDP–Laban hold			

==== Occidental Mindoro ====
Occidental Mindoro gubernatorial election
Party	Candidate	Votes	%
PDDS	Eduardo Gadiano	117,460	57.32
PDP–Laban	Mario Gene Mendiola (Incumbent)	87,449	42.68
Total votes		204,909	100.00

==== Oriental Mindoro ====
Oriental Mindoro (Note: Incumbent governor Alfonso Umali is term-limited and is running for congressman. His brother, incumbent congressman Reynaldo Umali is running in his place.) gubernatorial election
Party	Candidate	Votes	%
PDP–Laban	Humerlito Dolor	213,312	58.95
PFP	Reynaldo Umali	117,617	32.50
Lakas	Rodolfo Valencia	30,923	8.55
Total votes		361,852	100.00
PDP–Laban gain from Liberal			

==== Palawan ====
Palawan gubernatorial election
Party	Candidate	Votes	%
PPPL	Jose Alvarez	207,875	59.25
PDDS	Arthur Ventura	127,583	36.37
PGRP	Marichelle Crespo	8,579	2.45
Independent	Richard Lopez	5,233	1.49
Independent	Christopher Morales	1,559	0.44
Total votes		350,829	100.00

==== Romblon ====
Romblon (Note: Incumbent governor Eduardo Firmalo is term-limited and is running for congressman.) gubernatorial election
Party	Candidate	Votes	%
PDP–Laban	Jose Riano	75,563	54.16
Lakas	Robert Fabella	63,947	45.84
Total votes		139,510	100.00

=== Bicol Region ===
==== Albay ====
Albay Gubernatorial Election
Party	Candidate	Votes	%
PDP–Laban	Al Francis Bichara	292,767	53.24
Liberal	Harold Imperial	139,457	25.36
Independent	Hermogenes Alegre, Jr.	91,402	16.62
PM	Galma Arcilla	12,294	2.23
Independent	Paul Aguilar	5,662	1.02
Independent	Jaime Hernandez, Jr.	3,069	0.55
Independent	Mario Baquil	2,620	0.47
Independent	Zacarias Zaragoza	2,611	0.47
Total votes		549,882	100.00
PDP–Laban hold			

==== Camarines Norte ====
Camarines Norte gubernatorial election
Party	Candidate	Votes	%
PDP–Laban	Edgar Tallado	149,753	58.35
Liberal	Catherine Barcelona	105,149	40.97
Independent	Romeo Balmeo	1,734	0.68
Total votes		256,636	100.00

==== Camarines Sur ====
Camarines Sur gubernatorial election
Party	Candidate	Votes	%
PDP–Laban	Migz Villafuerte	413,592	49.97
NPC	Rolando Andaya Jr.	408,417	49.34
PDDS	Roger Buenaflor	5,708	0.69
Total votes		827,447	100.00

==== Catanduanes ====
Catanduanes gubernatorial election
Party	Candidate	Votes	%
UNA	Joseph Cua	85,559	57.78
PDP–Laban	Cesar Sarmiento	60,132	40.61
Independent	Fernando Chavez	1,214	0.82
Lakas	Marlon Suplig	1,184	0.80
Total votes		148,089	100.00

==== Masbate ====
Masbate gubernatorial election
Party	Candidate	Votes	%
PDP–Laban	Antonio Kho	265,850	68.55
NPC	Scott Davies Lanete	121,985	31.45
Total votes		387,835	100.00

==== Sorsogon ====
Sorsogon (Note: Incumbent governor Bobet Lee Rodrigueza is running for congressman.) gubernatorial election
Party	Candidate	Votes	%
NPC	Francis Escudero	303,960	87.56
PDP–Laban	Vladimir Ramon Frivaldo	31,867	9.18
PFP	Redentor Guyala	2,985	0.86
Independent	Rolando Rollin Galides	2,550	0.73
PM	Lady Gabarda	2,084	0.60
Independent	Nestor Gotis	1,838	0.53
Independent	Michael Lopez	1,163	0.34
Independent	Mandy Lucila	694	0.20
Total votes		347,141	100.00

== Visayas ==
Here are the election results as provided by the (COMELEC) for the provinces in Visayas.

=== Western Visayas ===
==== Aklan ====
Aklan gubernatorial election
Party	Candidate	Votes	%
PDP–Laban	Florencio Miraflores	143,431	50.82
NPC	William Lachica	135,769	48.10
Independent	Pablo Beltran, Jr.	2,415	0.86
Independent	Felicisimo Tanumtanum, Jr.	642	0.23
Total votes		282,257	100.00

==== Antique ====
Antique gubernatorial election
Party	Candidate	Votes	%
NUP	Rhodora Cadiao	182,026	66.52
PDP–Laban	Paolo Everardo Javier	91,608	33.48
Total votes		273,634	100.00

==== Capiz ====
Capiz gubernatorial election
Party	Candidate	Votes	%
Independent	Esteban Evan Contreras	161,475	46.69
Liberal	Antonio del Rosario (Incumbent)	143,809	41.58
PFP	Joel Longares	38,437	11.11
PDDS	Elmer Villasis	2,136	6.18
Total votes		345,857	100.00

==== Guimaras ====
Guimaras gubernatorial election
Party	Candidate	Votes	%
PDP–Laban	Samuel Gumarin	76,905	93.85
PFP	Florencio Gareza	4,990	6.15
Total votes		81,895	100.00

==== Iloilo ====
Incumbent Governor Arthur Defensor Sr. is term-limited and he is set to retire from politics. His son, incumbent congressman Arthur Defensor, Jr. is running in his place.

Iloilo (Note: Incumbent Governor Arthur Defensor Sr. is term-limited and he is set to retire from politics. His son, incumbent congressman Arthur Defensor, Jr. is running in his place.) gubernatorial election
Party	Candidate	Votes	%
PDP–Laban	Arthur Defensor Jr.	479,081	54.40
Nacionalista	Ferjenel Biron	391,403	44.45
PDDS	Esperidion Javier	4,564	0.52
Independent	Vicente Antay	2,840	0.32
Independent	Jonry Gargarita	2,755	0.31
Total votes		880,643	100.00

==== Negros Occidental ====
Negros Occidental (Note: Incumbent Governor Alfredo Marañon Jr. is term-limited.) gubernatorial election
Party	Candidate	Votes	%
NPC	Eugenio Jose Lacson	827,657	94.80
Independent	Rolando Parpa	45,412	5.20
Total votes		873,069	100.00

=== Central Visayas ===
==== Bohol ====
Incumbent governor Edgar Chatto is term-limited and he is running for Congressman.

Bohol (Note: Incumbent governor Edgar Chatto is running for Congressman.) gubernatorial election
Party	Candidate	Votes	%
PDP–Laban	Arthur Yap	326,895	49.45
NPC	Leoncio Evasco Jr.	324,734	49.13
Independent	Concepcion Flores	3,672	0.56
KKK	Hercules Castillo	3,108	0.47
Independent	Roberto Reyes	2,608	0.39
Total votes		661,017	100.00

==== Cebu ====
Cebu (Note: Incumbent governor Hilario Davide III is running for Vice Governor.) Gubernatorial election
Party	Candidate	Votes	%
PDP–Laban	Gwendolyn Garcia	887,290	58.51
NPC	Agnes Magpale	598,567	39.47
Independent	Roliveth Cortes	30,499	2.01
Total votes		1,516,356	100.00

==== Negros Oriental ====
Negros Oriental gubernatorial election
Party	Candidate	Votes	%
Nacionalista	Roel Degamo	425,405	77.59
Independent	Jessica Jane Villanueva	122,881	22.41
Total votes		548,286	100.00

==== Siquijor ====
Siquijor gubernatorial election
Party	Candidate	Votes	%
PDP–Laban	Zaldy Villa	41,155	74.61
PFP	Joecel Luy	14,004	25.39
Total votes		55,159	100.00

=== Eastern Visayas ===
==== Biliran ====
Biliran (Note: Incumbent governor Gerardo Espina, Jr. is term-limited and is running for congressman. His brother, incumbent congressman Rogelio Espina is running in his place.) gubernatorial election
Party	Candidate	Votes	%
Nacionalista	Rogelio Espina	55,836	65.26
Bagumbayan	Edwin Masbang	29,039	33.94
Independent	Edgardo Ambe	678	0.79
Total votes		85,553	100.00

==== Eastern Samar ====
Eastern Samar (Note: Incumbent governor Conrado Nicart, Jr. is term-limited.) gubernatorial election
Party	Candidate	Votes	%
PDP–Laban	Ben Evardone	127,857	56.36
Nacionalista	Marcelo Ferdinand Picardal	97,286	42.88
LM	Alfredo Hobayan	1,723	0.76
Total votes		226,866	100.00

==== Leyte ====
Leyte gubernatorial election
Party	Candidate	Votes	%
PDP–Laban	Leopoldo Dominico Petilla	450,199	93.90
Independent	Romeo Plasquita	29,256	6.10
Total votes		479,455	100.00

==== Northern Samar ====
Northern Samar (Note: Incumbent governor Jose Ong, Jr. is running for congressman.) gubernatorial election
Party	Candidate	Votes	%
NUP	Edwin Marino Ongchuan	184,526	100.00
Total votes		184,526	100.00
NUP hold			

==== Samar ====
Samar (Note: Incumbent governor Sharee Ann Tan is term-limited and is running for congresswoman. Her mother, incumbent congresswoman Milagrosa Tan is running in her place.) gubernatorial election
Party	Candidate	Votes	%
PDP–Laban	Milagrosa Tan	211,764	50.92
Lakas	Emilio Soza	204,118	49.08
Total votes		415,882	100.00

==== Southern Leyte ====
Southern Leyte gubernatorial election
Party	Candidate	Votes	%
PDP–Laban	Damian Mercado	135,172	75.42
Lakas	Miguel Maamo III	37,189	20.75
Independent	Vicente Geraldo	2,953	1.65
Independent	Eddy Edillo	2,016	1.12
Independent	Miguelino Caturan	1,906	1.06
Total votes		179,236	100.00

== Mindanao ==
Here are the election results as provided by the (COMELEC) for the provinces in Mindanao.

=== Zamboanga Peninsula ===
==== Zamboanga del Norte ====
Roberto Escobido Uy was declared nuisance by the COMELEC after carrying the name similar to incumbent Governor Roberto Y. Uy, bringing confusion to voters of the locality.

Zamboanga del Norte gubernatorial election
Party	Candidate	Votes	%
PDP–Laban	Roberto "Berto" Y. Uy	219,412	46.91
Nacionalista	Seth Frederick "Bullet" P. Jalosjos	216,517	46.29
Independent	Roberto Escobido Uy	23,231	4.97
PFP	Artemio "Tim" Adasa, Jr.	4,050	0.87
Independent	Eduardo Sumalpong	1,996	0.43
LM	Nestor Dapar	1,301	0.28
Independent	Eufracio "Dodoy" C. Bala, Sr.	1,190	0.25
Total votes		467,697	100.00
PDP–Laban hold			

==== Zamboanga del Sur ====
Zamboanga del Sur (Note: Incumbent governor Antonio Cerilles is term-limited and is running for congressman, switching places with his wife, incumbent congresswoman Aurora Enerio-Cerilles. Both lost in the elections.) gubernatorial election
Party	Candidate	Votes	%
PDP–Laban	Victor Yu	274,328	60.62
Nacionalista	Aurora E. Cerilles	174,912	38.65
Independent	Anam Lawisan	1,497	0.33
Independent	Rene Amdon	1,060	0.23
PFP	Daniel Angelo Mercado	761	0.17
Total votes		452,558	100.00

==== Zamboanga Sibugay ====
Zamboanga Sibugay gubernatorial election
Party	Candidate	Votes	%
PDP–Laban	Wilter Palma	139,130	51.86
Independent	George Hofer II	127,226	47.42
Independent	Matthew Alison Apostol	1,531	0.57
Independent	Elvira Rempis	408	0.15
Total votes		268,295	100.00

=== Northern Mindanao ===
==== Bukidnon ====
Bukidnon gubernatorial election
Party	Candidate	Votes	%
BPP	Jose Maria Zubiri, Jr.	440,132	78.10
PDP–Laban	Leandro Catarata	98,408	17.46
Independent	Diosdado Tabios	14,354	2.55
Independent	Edgar Mabilog	5,418	0.96
Independent	Andrew Eligan	5,217	0.93
Total votes		563,529	100.00

==== Camiguin ====
Camiguin (Note: Incumbent governor Ma. Luisa Romualdo is not running. Her husband, former Governor incumbent Mambajao Mayor Jurdin Jesus Romualdo is running in her place.) gubernatorial election
Party	Candidate	Votes	%
NPC	Jurdin Jesus Romualdo	40,217	88.22
PDDS	Rona Nera	3,513	7.71
PFP	Periolo Banaag	1,855	4.07
Total votes		45,585	100.00

==== Lanao del Norte ====
Lanao del Norte gubernatorial election
Party	Candidate	Votes	%
PDP–Laban	Imelda Quibranza Dimaporo	186,535	77.54
PFP	Rafael Rizalda	47,544	19.76
PCP	Amer Nagamura Moner	6,491	2.70
Total votes		240,570	100.00

==== Misamis Occidental ====
Misamis Occidental (Note: Incumbent governor Herminia Ramiro is term-limited and is running for congresswoman.) gubernatorial election
Party	Candidate	Votes	%
Nacionalista	Philip Tan	172,100	60.45
Lakas	Loreto Leo Ocampos	109,673	38.53
PDDS	Victorio Estudillo	2,906	1.02
Total votes		284,679	100.00

==== Misamis Oriental ====
Incumbent Governor Yevgeny Vincente Emano is running for reelection.

Misamis Oriental gubernatorial election
Party	Candidate	Votes	%
Hugpong	Yevgeny Vincente Emano	250,433	55.42
NUP	Julio Uy	198,197	43.87
Independent	Manuel Po	3,232	0.71
Total votes		451,862	100.00

=== Davao Region ===
==== Compostela Valley ====
Incumbent Governor Jayvee Tyron Uy is running for reelection unopposed.

Compostela Valley gubernatorial election
Party	Candidate	Votes	%
Hugpong	Jayvee Tyron Uy	256,341	100.00
Total votes		256,341	100.00
Hugpong hold			

==== Davao del Norte ====
Davao del Norte (Note: Incumbent governor Anthony del Rosario is running for congressman. His father, former Governor Rodolfo del Rosario, Jr. is running in his place.) gubernatorial election
Party	Candidate	Votes	%
PDP–Laban	Edwin Jubahib	280,335	62.25
Hugpong	Rodolfo del Rosario, Jr.	169,982	37.75
Total votes		450,317	100.00

==== Davao del Sur ====
Davao del Sur gubernatorial election
Party	Candidate	Votes	%
Independent	Douglas Cagas	185,466	61.28
Hugpong	Joseph Peñas	115,461	38.15
Independent	Emilio Lustre	1,732	0.57
Total votes		302,659	100.00

==== Davao Occidental ====
Davao Occidental gubernatorial election
Party	Candidate	Votes	%
Hugpong	Claude Bautista	98,331	100.00
Total votes		98,331	100.00
Hugpong hold			

==== Davao Oriental ====
Davao Oriental gubernatorial election
Party	Candidate	Votes	%
Nacionalista	Nelson Dayanghirang	188,884	100.00
Total votes		188,884	100.00
Nacionalista hold			

=== Soccksargen ===
==== Cotabato ====
Cotabato (Note: Incumbent governor Emmylou Taliño-Mendoza is term-limited and is running for Vice Governor. Her father, incumbent Carmen Mayor Rogelio Taliño is running in her place.) gubernatorial election
Party	Candidate	Votes	%
PDP–Laban	Nancy Catamco	272,249	49.48
Nacionalista	Rogelio Taliño	268,718	48.83
Independent	Abdulbassit Dilangalen	4,783	0.87
Independent	Manuel Adajar	2,615	0.48
Independent	Norodin Mangulamas	1,889	0.34
Total votes		550,254	100.00

==== Sarangani ====
Sarangani gubernatorial election
Party	Candidate	Votes	%
PDP–Laban	Steve Solon	175,010	86.32
Independent	Bong Aquia	27,742	13.68
Total votes		202,752	100.00

==== South Cotabato ====
South Cotabato gubernatorial election
Party	Candidate	Votes	%
PFP	Reynaldo Tamayo Jr.	222,060	53.24
NPC	Daisy Avance Fuentes	195,038	46.76
Total votes		417,098	100.00

==== Sultan Kudarat ====
Sultan Kudarat (Note: Incumbent governor Pax Mangudadatu is retiring from politics. His son, incumbent congressman Suharto Mangudadatu is running in his place.) gubernatorial election
Party	Candidate	Votes	%
NUP	Suharto Mangudadatu	223,043	84.49
Independent	Carlos Valdez, Jr.	40,945	15.51
Total votes		263,988	100.00

=== Caraga ===
==== Agusan del Norte ====
Agusan del Norte (Note: Incumbent governor Angelica Amante is running for congresswoman. Her niece, Juan Miguel Amante is running in her place.) gubernatorial election
Party	Candidate	Votes	%
PDP–Laban	Dale Corvera	123,726	62.80
Nacionalista	Juan Miguel Amante	73,284	37.20
Total votes		197,010	100.00
PDP–Laban gain from Nacionalista			

==== Agusan del Sur ====
Agusan del Sur (Note: Incumbent governor Eddiebong Plaza is term-limited and is running for congressman. His sister, incumbent congresswoman Maria Valentina Plaza is running in his place.) gubernatorial election
Party	Candidate	Votes	%
NUP	Santiago Cane Jr.	150,479	51.32
PDSP	Maria Valentina Plaza	109,219	37.25
PFP	Hilarion Clapis, Jr.	33,513	11.43
Total votes		293,211	100.00
NUP gain from PDSP			

==== Dinagat Islands ====
Incumbent governor Glenda Ecleo is not running for she is term-limited. Her son, incumbent Vice Governor Benglen Ecleo is running in her place.

Dinagat Islands (Note: Incumbent governor Glenda Ecleo is not running. Her son, incumbent Vice Governor Benglen Ecleo is running in her place.) gubernatorial election
Party	Candidate	Votes	%
Liberal	Arlene Bag-ao	29,869	52.67
PDP–Laban	Benglen Ecleo	26,843	47.33
Total votes		56,712	100.00
Liberal gain from PDP–Laban			

==== Surigao del Norte ====
Surigao del Norte (Note: Incumbent governor Sol Matugas is term-limited and is running for congresswoman. Her husband, former congressman Francisco Matugas is running in her place.) gubernatorial election
Party	Candidate	Votes	%
PDP–Laban	Lalo Matugas	152,152	54.22
Nacionalista	Lyndon Barbers	128,465	45.78
Total votes		280,617	100.00
PDP–Laban gain from Nacionalista			

==== Surigao del Sur ====
Surigao del Sur (Note: Incumbent governor Manuel Almeda, Sr. assumed office after the death of former Governor Vicente Pimentel Jr. is running for Board Member.) gubernatorial election
Party	Candidate	Votes	%
PDP–Laban	Alexander Pimentel	202,072	73.06
PFP	Jose Dumagan, Jr.	56,969	20.60
Independent	Anetico Murillo	13,195	4.77
Hugpong	Waway Tranquilan	2,299	0.83
Independent	Jerry Antigo	2,044	0.74
Total votes		276,579	100.00
PDP–Laban gain from PFP			

=== Bangsamoro Autonomous Region in Muslim Mindanao ===
This year's elections are the first time people of the five provinces of the Bangsamoro region will elect their respective provincial governors.

==== Basilan ====
Basilan gubernatorial election
Party	Candidate	Votes	%
PDP–Laban	Hadjiman Hataman Salliman	82,106	50.45
Lakas	Alfiya Fernandez	77,097	47.38
Independent	Abdurahman Ahmad	1,102	0.68
PDDS	Nurshima Faisal	784	0.48
Independent	Kasim Idris	618	0.38
Independent	Kim Jainuddin	343	0.21
Independent	Damayin Pahalawan	284	0.17
Independent	Manijra Salao	223	0.14
Independent	Munir Kasad	182	0.11
Total votes		162,739	100.00
PDP–Laban gain from Lakas			

==== Lanao del Sur ====
Lanao del Sur gubernatorial election
Party	Candidate	Votes	%
Lakas	Mamintal Alonto Adiong Jr.	263,033	72.12
PDP–Laban	Gene Mamondiong	40,617	11.14
Independent	Binladen Sharief	24,429	6.70
Independent	Hatta Dimaporo	19,984	5.48
LM	Sultan Bob Datimbang	12,297	3.37
PDDS	Mamad Molia	1,963	0.54
Independent	Ganie Abubacar	1,211	0.33
Independent	Ahmadjan Abdulcarim	1,199	0.33
Total votes		364,733	100.00
Lakas gain from PDP–Laban			

==== Maguindanao ====
Maguindanao (Note: Incumbent governor Esmael Mangudadatu is term-limited and is running for congressman. His brother, Freddie Mangudadatu is running in his place.) gubernatorial election
Party	Candidate	Votes	%
Nacionalista	Bai Mariam Mangudadatu	256,338	55.62
PDP–Laban	Freddie Mangudadatu	201,565	43.74
KBL	Esmael Adam	1,314	0.29
PDSP	Nasser Dalgan	654	0.14
Independent	Bai King Myla Sultan Mayo	619	0.13
Independent	Rocky Ali	355	0.08
Total votes		460,845	100.00
Nacionalista gain from PDP–Laban			

==== Sulu ====
Sulu gubernatorial election
Party	Candidate	Votes	%
PDP–Laban	Abdusakur Tan	158,443	58.00
PFP	Benjamin Loong	113,538	41.56
Independent	Abdulkarim Misuari	649	0.24
Independent	Kadra Masihul	543	0.20
Total votes		273,173	100.00
PDP–Laban gain from PFP			

==== Tawi-Tawi ====
Tawi-Tawi gubernatorial election
Party	Candidate	Votes	%
NUP	Yshmael Sali	92,795	59.06
PDP–Laban	Sadikul Sahali	62,887	40.02
PFP	Aminsali Jumah	1,039	0.66
PDDS	Shareen Alvarez	413	0.26
Total votes		157,134	100.00
NUP gain from PDP–Laban			
