= 2019 Zambales local elections =

Philippine election

2019 Zambales gubernatorial election
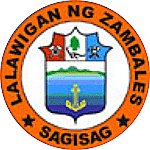
- May 13, 2019
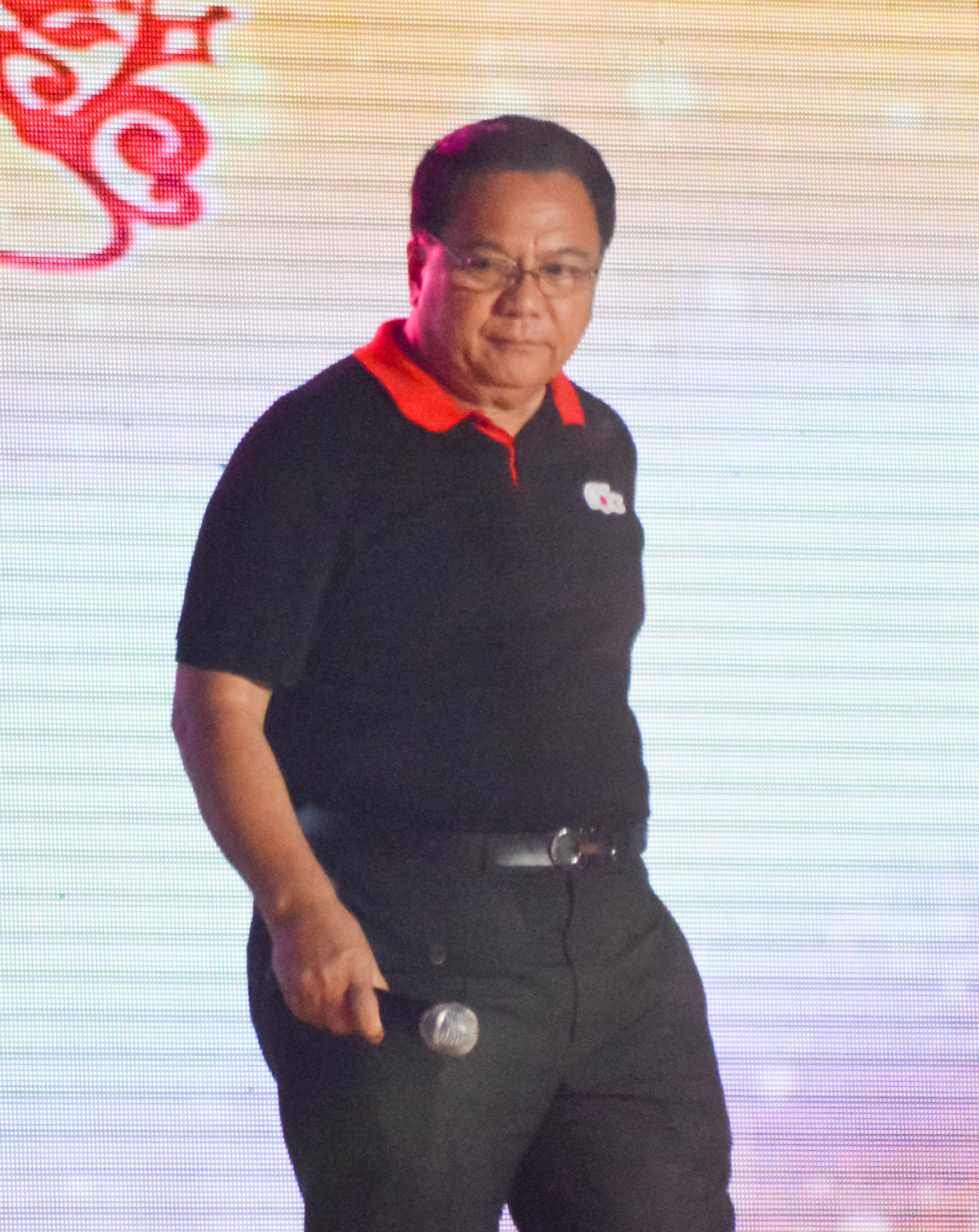
		MAKIMAZA
Nominee	Hermogenes Ebdane	Amor Deloso
Party	PDP–Laban	MAKIMAZA
Running mate	Jefferson Khonghun	Angel Magsaysay-Cheng
Popular vote	151,667	128,692
Percentage	54.09	45.90
- Results by municipality and by barangay
Governor before election
Amor Deloso
MAKIMAZA
Elected Governor
Hermogenes Ebdane
PDP–Laban

The Zambales local elections was held on May 13, 2019, as part of the 2019 general election. Voters will select candidates for all local positions: a town mayor, vice mayor and town councilors, as well as members of the Sangguniang Panlalawigan, the vice-governor, governor and representatives for the two districts of Zambales. Incumbent Governor Amor Deloso and Vice Governor Angel Magsaysay-Cheng are seeking re-election for their second term.

Former Governor Hermogenes Ebdane, who served for two terms from 2010 until his defeat in 2016, won his election as Governor, defeating incumbent Amor Deloso. Incumbent Vice Governor Angel Magsaysay-Cheng was also defeated by Ebdane's running mate Jefferson Khonghun.

== Provincial elections ==
Zambales Gubernatorial Election
Party	Candidate	Votes	%
PDP–Laban	Hermogenes Ebdane	151,667	54.09
MAKIMAZA	Amor Deloso	128,692	45.90
Total votes		280,359	100
PDP–Laban gain from MAKIMAZA			

Zambales Vice Gubernatorial Election
Party	Candidate	Votes	%
PDP–Laban	Jefferson "Jay" Khonghun	181,402	66.26
PFP	Angel Magsaysay-Cheng	92,364	33.73
Total votes		273,766	100
PDP–Laban gain from Nacionalista			

== Congressional elections ==
=== 1st District ===
2019 Philippine House of Representatives election in Zambales 1st District
Party	Candidate	Votes	%
PDP–Laban	Jeffrey Khonghun	115,172	70.37
PFP	Milagros "Mitos" Magsaysay	47,125	28.79
Independent	Allan Avila	1,360	0.83
Total votes		163,657	100

=== 2nd District ===
2019 Philippine House of Representatives election in Zambales 2nd District
Party	Candidate	Votes	%
Liberal	Cheryl Deloso-Montalla	134,801	69.98
PDP–Laban	Wilfredo Paul Pangan	57,801	30.01
Total votes		192,602	100

== Provincial board elections ==
Party	Popular vote		Seats	
Party	Total	%	Total	%
PDP–Laban	671,037	67.07%	8	62%
PFP	211,386	21.13%	1	8%
Liberal	70,845	7.08%	1	8%
MAKIMAZA	19,954	1.99%	0	0%
Independent	27,239	2.72%	0	0%
Total	1,000,461	100%	10	77%

=== 1st District ===
Provincial Board Members (1st District)
Party	Candidate	Votes	%
PDP–Laban	Wilfredo Felarca Jr.	52,952	32.44
PDP–Laban	Jose Gutierrez Jr.	48,618	29.79
PDP–Laban	Enrique Delgado	41,676	25.53
MAKIMAZA	Loretta Dela Llana	19,954	12.22
Total votes			

=== 2nd District ===
Provincial Board Members (2nd District)
Party	Candidate	Votes	%
PFP	Jury Deloso	100,814	12.04
PDP–Laban	Renato Collado	93,207	11.13
PDP–Laban	Carolyn Fariñas	85,405	10.20
PDP–Laban	Sancho Abasta III	82,237	9.82
PDP–Laban	Reinhard Jeresano	74,822	8.93
PDP–Laban	Reynaldo Tarongoy	71,167	8.49
Liberal	Samuel Ablola	70,845	8.46
PDP–Laban	Rolex Estella	69,429	8.29
PFP	Saturnino Bactad	57,307	6.84
PFP	Noel Ferrer	53,265	6.36
PDP–Laban	Miguel Maniago Jr.	51,524	6.15
Independent	Florante Miano	14,609	1.64
Independent	William Mandilag	12,630	1.50
Total votes			

== City and municipal elections ==
=== 1st District ===
- City: Olongapo
- Municipalities: Castillejos, San Marcelino, Subic

==== Olongapo ====
Olongapo Mayoralty Election
Party	Candidate	Votes	%
Nacionalista	Rolen Paulino Jr.	58,131	68.39
Lakas	Anne Marie Gordon	26,859	31.60
Total votes		84,990	100

==== Castillejos ====
Castillejos Mayoralty Election
Party	Candidate	Votes	%
PDP–Laban	Eleanor Dominguez	10,803	48.54
Nacionalista	Christian Esposo	7,294	32.77
Liberal	Lamberto Francisco Ramirez	4,155	18.67
Total votes		22,252	100

==== San Marcelino ====
San Marcelino Mayoralty Election
Party	Candidate	Votes	%
PDP–Laban	Elvis Soria	11,841	69.48
PFP	Jose Rodriguez	5,200	30.51
Total votes		17,041	100

==== Subic ====
Jay Khonghun is the incumbent.

Subic Mayoralty Election
Party	Candidate	Votes	%
PDP–Laban	Jonathan John "Jon-Jon" Khonghun	36,519	84.80
Liberal	Ramon Groesbeck Lacbain II	6,544	15.19
Total votes		43,063	100

=== 2nd District ===
- Municipalities: Botolan, Cabangan, Candelaria, Iba, Masinloc, Palauig, San Antonio, San Felipe, San Narciso, Santa Cruz

==== Botolan ====
Doris "Bing Maniquiz" Jeresano is the incumbent.

Botolan Mayoralty Election
Party	Candidate	Votes	%
PDP–Laban	Doris "Bing Maniquiz" Jeresano	24,316	73.59
NPC	Izelle Iamly Deloso	8,626	26.10
PFP	Grover Flores	100	0.30
Total votes		33,042	100

==== Cabangan ====
Cabangan Mayoralty Election
Party	Candidate	Votes	%
PDP–Laban	Ronaldo Apostol	6,701	47.98
Independent	Julius Bada	5,975	42.78
PFP	Eda Medrano	1,289	9.23
Total votes		13,965	100

==== Candelaria ====
Candelaria Mayoralty Election
Party	Candidate	Votes	%
PDP–Laban	Napoleon Edquid	7,557	54.18
PFP	Penny Ednave	3,275	23.48
NPC	Gilbert Hermoso	3,021	21.66
Independent	Eloisa Lat	94	0.67
Total votes		13,947	100

==== Iba ====
Jun Rundstedt Ebdane is the incumbent.

Iba Mayoralty Election
Party	Candidate	Votes	%
PDP–Laban	Jun Rundstedt Ebdane	18,544	74.63
NPC	Ad Hebert Deloso	6,303	25.36
Total votes		24,847	100

==== Masinloc ====
Masinloc Mayoralty Election
Party	Candidate	Votes	%
PFP	Arsenia Lim	19,022	67.12
PDP–Laban	Desiree Edora	9,318	32.87
Total votes		28,340	100

==== Palauig ====
Palauig Mayoralty Election
Party	Candidate	Votes	%
PDP–Laban	Billy Aceron	13,058	67.91
Independent	Generoso Amog	6,056	31.49
PFP	Noel Giron	114	0.59
Total votes		19,228	100

==== San Antonio ====
San Antonio Mayoralty Election
Party	Candidate	Votes	%
Independent	Preciliano Ruiz	8,077	50.94
PFP	Estela Antipolo	7,777	49.05
Total votes		15,854	100

==== San Felipe ====
San Felipe Mayoralty Election
Party	Candidate	Votes	%
PFP	Leo John Farrales	6,416	57.81
PDP–Laban	Ramil Ablian	2,217	19.97
Independent	Bulan Rosete	1,443	13.00
Independent	Francisco Rosete Jr.	1,022	9.20
Total votes		11,098	100

==== San Narciso ====
San Narciso Mayoralty Election
Party	Candidate	Votes	%
PDP–Laban	William Lim	5,809	39.39
NPC	La Rianne Sarmiento	5,598	37.96
PFP	Richard Lance Ritual	3,338	22.63
Total votes		14,745	100

==== Santa Cruz ====
Santa Cruz Mayoralty Election
Party	Candidate	Votes	%
PDP–Laban	Luisito Marty	15,427	54.92
PFP	Angel Maestre Jr.	12,454	44.34
Independent	Richard Monsalud	204	0.72
Total votes		28,085	100
