= 2022 Zambales local elections =

Elections in Zambales

- 9 May 2022
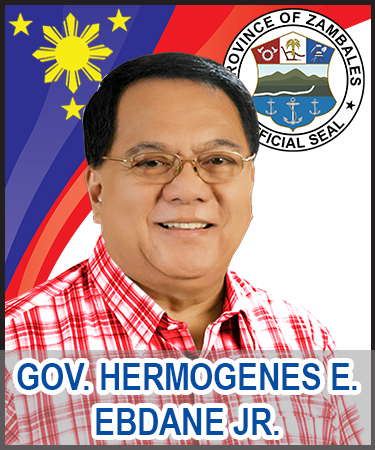
Nominee	Hermogenes Ebdane	Cheryl Deloso-Montalla
Party	SZP	NPC
Running mate	Jacqueline Rose Khonghun	Ramon; Lacbain II
Popular vote	199,874	133,479
Percentage	59.69	39.86
Governor before election
Hermogenes Ebdane
PDP–Laban
Elected Governor
Hermogenes Ebdane
SZP

The Zambales local election was held on May 9, 2022 as part of the 2022 general election. Voters will select candidates for all local positions: a town mayor, vice mayor and town councilors, as well as members of the Sangguniang Panlalawigan, the vice-governor, governor and representatives for the two districts of Zambales.

== Background ==
Incumbent Governor Hermogenes Ebdane is running for reelection his main opponent is Incumbent 2nd District Representative Cheryl Deloso-Montalla.

Incumbent Vice Governor Jefferson Khonghun is not running for reelection instead he run for 1st District Representative to succeed his father who are term-limited Jeffrey Khonghun, Jacqueline Rose "Jaq" Khonghun is running for Vice Governor to replaced his brother Incumbent Jefferson Khonghun, Jaq Khonghun main opponent is Ramon Lacbain II.

== Gubernatorial and Vice gubernatorial elections ==
=== Governor ===
Gubernatorial election
Party	Candidate	Votes	%
SZP	Hermogenes Ebdane (Incumbent)	199,874	59.69
NPC	Cheryl Deloso-Montalla	133,479	39.86
PDDS	Milinia Nuezca	1,502	0.45
Total votes		334,855	100.00
SZP hold			

==== Result per city/municipality ====
City/Municipality	Ebdane		Deloso–Montalla		Nuezca		Status
City/Municipality	Votes	%	Votes	%	Votes	%	Status
Botolan	18,209	49.13	18,700	50.46	152	0.41	Final
Cabangan	9,347	60.97	5,939	38.74	45	0.29	Final
Candelaria	9,979	61.19	6,259	38.38	70	0.43	Final
Castillejos	19,254	69.09	8,474	30.34	158	0.57	Final
Iba	16,958	56.61	12,905	43.08	93	0.31	Final
Masinloc	15,441	48.52	16,293	51.19	93	0.29	Final
Palauig	13,399	58.52	9,412	41.11	84	0.37	Final
San Antonio	10,762	57.71	7,785	41.74	103	0.55	Final
San Felipe	7,642	57.12	5,621	42.01	116	0.87	Final
San Marcelino	12,530	57.12	6,420	33.77	62	0.33	Final
San Narciso	8,619	52.41	7,732	47.02	93	0.57	Final
Santa Cruz	17,505	52.36	15,775	47.18	154	0.46	Final
Subic	40,189	76.36	12,164	23.11	279	0.53	Final
TOTAL	199,874	59.69	133,479	39.86	1,502	0.45	Final

=== Vice governor ===
Vice gubernatorial election
Party	Candidate	Votes	%
Aksyon	Jacqueline Rose Khonghun	215,668	70.53
Independent	Ramon Lacbain II	90,098	29.47
Total votes		305,766	100.00
Aksyon hold			

=== Result per city/municipality ===
City/Municipality	Khonghun		Lacbain		Status
City/Municipality	Votes	%	Votes	%	Status
Botolan	24,367	73.96	8,577	26.04	Final
Cabangan	8,849	63.33	5,124	36.67	Final
Candelaria	9,823	69.30	4,351	30.70	Final
Castillejos	19,139	70.28	8,094	29.72	Final
Iba	17,597	64.39	9,733	35.61	Final
Masinloc	16,864	60.75	10,897	39.25	Final
Palauig	13,727	67.59	6,582	32.41	Final
San Antonio	11,258	68.74	5,120	31.26	Final
San Felipe	7,791	65.30	4,141	34.70	Final
San Marcelino	14,895	81.44	3,395	18.56	Final
San Narciso	9,368	63.43	5,401	36.57	Final
Santa Cruz	20,980	73.40	7,602	26.60	Final
Subic	41,010	78.73	11,081	21.27	Final
TOTAL	215,668	70.53	90,098	29.47	Final

== Congressional elections ==
=== 1st District ===
2022 Philippine House of Representatives elections in Zambales's 1st District
Party	Candidate	Votes	%
Nacionalista	Jefferson Khonghun	156,561	79.54
PDP–Laban	Ma. Milagros Habana-Magsaysay	40,262	20.46
Total votes		196,823	100.00
Nacionalista hold			

=== 2nd District ===
2022 Philippine House of Representatives elections in Zambales's 2nd District
Party	Candidate	Votes	%
SZP	Doris Maniquiz	144,060	62.13
NPC	Amor Deloso	76,906	33.17
Independent	Philip Camara	10,890	4.70
Total votes		231,856	100.00
SZP gain from NPC			

== Provincial board elections ==
Party	Votes	%	Seats
Sulong Zambales Party	693,336	52.27	8
Nationalist People's Coalition	348,287	26.26	–
Labor Party Philippines	82,536	6.22	1
Partido Federal ng Pilipinas	66,414	5.01	1
Aksyon Demokratiko	38,264	2.88	–
Liberal Party	10,759	0.81	–
People's Reform Party	4,763	0.36	–
Independent	82,004	6.18	–
Ex officio seats			3
Total	1,326,363	100.00	13

=== 1st District ===
2022 Zambales Provincial Board elections in 1st District
Party	Candidate	Votes	%
SZP	Jose Gutierrez Jr. (Incumbent)	59,125	24.28
SZP	Wilfredo Felarca Jr. (Incumbent)	55,870	22.94
SZP	Enrique Delgado (Incumbent)	53,156	21.82
NPC	Michael Joseph Laruta	32,710	13.43
Independent	Jason Lacbain	25,625	10.52
NPC	Reymundo Navarro	17,071	7.01
Total votes		243,557	100.00

=== 2nd District ===
2022 Zambales Provincial Board elections in 2nd District
Party	Candidate	Votes	%
SZP	Jun Rundstedt Ebdane	118,219	10.91
SZP	Reena Mae Collado	110,922	10.24
SZP	Wilfredo Paul Pangan	101,287	9.35
WPP	Samantha Ablola	82,536	7.62
SZP	Reynaldo Tarongoy (Incumbent)	70,801	6.53
PFP	Sancho Abasta III (Incumbent)	66,414	6.13
SZP	Lugil Ragadio	61,075	5.64
NPC	Raedag Villamin Jr.	60,087	5.54
NPC	Noel Ferrer	56,064	5.17
SZP	Enrico Matibag	51,879	4.79
NPC	Alcade Fallorin	51,649	4.77
NPC	Saturnino Bactad	48,204	4.45
NPC	Domingo Diviva V	45,177	4.17
Aksyon	Keith Doble	38,264	3.53
NPC	Novrina Bigilda Orge	18,801	1.73
NPC	Ramon Fernandez	18,524	1.71
Independent	Eddie Misa	15,139	1.40
Independent	Freddie Ferranco	11,480	1.06
Independent	Florante Miano	11,391	1.05
SZP	Napoleon Edquid	11,002	1.02
Liberal	Norma Amata	10,759	0.99
Independent	Roland Rogayan	6,618	0.61
Independent	Ma. Remedios Coady	5,961	0.55
Independent	Remzon Aballa	5,790	0.53
PRP	Adlai Enrique Vega	4,763	0.44
Total votes		1,083,734	100.00

== City and municipal elections ==
=== 1st District ===
- City: Olongapo
- Municipalities: Castillejos, San Marcelino, Subic

==== Olongapo ====
Mayoralty election
Party	Candidate	Votes	%
Nacionalista	Rolen Paulino Jr. (Incumbent)	53,117	54.30
Aksyon	Priscilla Ponge	26,549	27.14
PDP–Laban	Arnold Vegafria	14,742	15.07
Liberal	Anne Gordon	2,896	2.96
Independent	Apolonio Cunanan	305	0.31
PFP	Delfin Pradas	204	0.21
Total votes		97,813	100.00
Nacionalista hold			

==== Castillejos ====
Mayoralty election
Party	Candidate	Votes	%
Nacionalista	Jeffrey Khonghun	16,505	57.15
Reporma	Jose Angelo Dominguez	7,343	25.43
PDP–Laban	Angelica Magsaysay	4,715	16.32
RP	Claude Navalta Dalit Sr.	318	1.10
Total votes		28,881	100.00
Nacionalista gain from PDP–Laban			

==== San Marcelino ====
Mayoralty election
Party	Candidate	Votes	%
SZP	Elmer Soria (Incumbent)	17,420	100.00
Valid ballots		17,420	69.88
Invalid or blank votes		7,507	30.12
Total votes		24,927	100.00
SZP hold			

==== Subic ====
Mayoralty election
Party	Candidate	Votes	%
SZP	Jonathan John Khonghun (Incumbent)	43,214	80.73
PDP–Laban	Ranildo Maningding	10,159	18.98
Independent	Junar Egmao	158	0.30
Total votes		53,531	100.00
SZP hold			

=== 2nd District ===
- Municipalities: Botolan, Cabangan, Candelaria, Iba, Masinloc, Palauig, San Antonio, San Felipe, San Narciso, Santa Cruz

==== Botolan ====
Mayoralty election
Party	Candidate	Votes	%
SZP	Omar Ebdane	14,774	39.15
Independent	Rogelio Yap	10,094	26.75
Independent	Edmund Dante Perez	8,364	22.17
NPC	Jury Deloso	4,342	11.51
Independent	Bimbo Ochangco	161	0.43
Total votes		37,735	100.00
SZP hold			

==== Cabangan ====
Mayoralty election
Party	Candidate	Votes	%
SZP	Rolando Apostol (Incumbent)	8,538	54.13
WPP	Samuel Ablola	4,568	28.96
KBL	Julius Bada	2,667	16.91
Total votes		15,773	100.00
SZP hold			

==== Candelaria ====
Mayoralty election
Party	Candidate	Votes	%
PROMDI	Byron Jones Edquilang	7,324	43.90
Independent	Pedro Ecunar	4,660	27.93
SZP	Ilirmo Edejer	3,684	22.08
KBL	Vernie Mendoza	1,014	6.09
Total votes		16,782	100.00
PROMDI gain from PDP–Laban			

==== Iba ====
Mayoralty election
Party	Candidate	Votes	%
SZP	Irenea Maniquiz	17,424	58.44
PRP	Danilo Pamoleras	7,493	25.13
NPC	Ad Herbert Deloso	4,897	16.43
Total votes		29,814	100.00
SZP gain from PDP–Laban			

==== Masinloc ====
Mayoralty election
Party	Candidate	Votes	%
PRP	Arsenia Lim (Incumbent)	24,213	73.94
SZP	Rolex Estrella	8,534	26.06
Total votes		32,747	100.00
PRP hold			

==== Palauig ====
Mayoralty election
Party	Candidate	Votes	%
SZP	Billy Aceron (Incumbent)	13,124	55.44
NPC	Raedag Villamin	10,550	44.56
Total votes		23,674	100.00
SZP hold			

==== San Antonio ====
Mayoralty election
Party	Candidate	Votes	%
Aksyon	Edzel Lonzanida	9,172	47.10
Lakas	Arvin Rolly Antipolo	9,041	46.43
Independent	Preciliano Ruiz (Incumbent)	960	4.93
Independent	Juanito Dimaculangan	299	1.54
Total votes		19,472	100.00
Aksyon gain from Independent			

==== San Felipe ====
Mayoralty election
Party	Candidate	Votes	%
SZP	Reinhard Jeresano	5,942	42.90
NPC	Leo John Farrales (Incumbent)	5,455	39.38
Liberal	Carolyn Fariñas	1,925	13.90
Independent	Francisco Rosete Jr.	365	2.63
Independent	Edgardo Era	165	1.19
Total votes		13,852	100.00
SZP gain from PFP			

==== San Narciso ====
Mayoralty election
Party	Candidate	Votes	%
NPC	Larainne Abad–Sarmiento	8,747	53.03
SZP	William Lim (Incumbent)	7,748	46.97
Total votes		16,495	100.00
NPC gain from PDP–Laban			

==== Santa Cruz ====
Mayoralty election
Party	Candidate	Votes	%
Independent	Consolacion Marty	10,904	31.81
SZP	Renato Collado	7,512	21.92
Reporma	Joroel Espino	6,508	18.99
NPC	Angel Maestre Jr.	5,162	15.06
PFP	Kristan Rommel Misola	3,397	9.91
KBL	Jessie Merced	791	2.31
Total votes		34,274	100.00
Independent hold			
