= Kalinga's at-large congressional district =

At-large Philippine legislative district for Kalinga

- Constituency for the House of Representatives of the Philippines
- Location of Kalinga within the Philippines
- Province: Kalinga
- Region: Cordillera Administrative Region
- Population: 235,391 (2024)
- Electorate: 158,555 (2025)
- Area: 3,231.25 km^{2} (1,247.59 sq mi)

Current constituency
- Created: 1995
- Representative: Caroline Agyao
- Political party: PFP
- Congressional bloc: Majority

Kalinga's at-large congressional district is the sole congressional district of the Philippines for the province of Kalinga. It is currently represented in the 20th Congress by Caroline Agyao of Partido Federal ng Pilipinas.

== Recent election results from province-wide races ==
| Year | Office | Results |
|---|---|---|
| 2022 | President | Bongbong Marcos (PFP) 89.75% |
| 2022 | Vice President | Sara Duterte (Lakas) 85.02% |
| 2022 | Governor | James Edduba (Lakas) 46.57% |
| 2025 | Governor | James Edduba (Lakas) 55.23% |

== List of members representing the district ==
=== House of Representatives (1987–present) ===
| No. | Portrait | Member | Term of office | | Legislature | Party | Electoral history | Constituent LGUs |
| No. | Portrait | Member | Start | End | Legislature | Party | Electoral history | Constituent LGUs |
|---|---|---|---|---|---|---|---|---|
District created February 14, 1995.
| 1 | | Lawrence Wacnang | June 30, 1998 | June 30, 2007 | 11th Congress | Lakas | Elected in 1998. | 1995–present Balbalan, Lubuagan, Pasil, Pinukpuk, Rizal, Tabuk, Tanudan, Tinglayan |
| 1 | | Lawrence Wacnang | June 30, 1998 | June 30, 2007 | 12th Congress | Liberal | Re-elected in 2001. | 1995–present Balbalan, Lubuagan, Pasil, Pinukpuk, Rizal, Tabuk, Tanudan, Tinglayan |
| 1 | | Lawrence Wacnang | June 30, 1998 | June 30, 2007 | 13th Congress | Liberal | Re-elected in 2004. | 1995–present Balbalan, Lubuagan, Pasil, Pinukpuk, Rizal, Tabuk, Tanudan, Tinglayan |
| 2 | | Manuel Agyao | June 30, 2007 | June 30, 2016 | 14th Congress | Lakas | Elected in 2007. | 1995–present Balbalan, Lubuagan, Pasil, Pinukpuk, Rizal, Tabuk, Tanudan, Tinglayan |
| 2 | | Manuel Agyao | June 30, 2007 | June 30, 2016 | 15th Congress | Liberal | Re-elected in 2010. | 1995–present Balbalan, Lubuagan, Pasil, Pinukpuk, Rizal, Tabuk, Tanudan, Tinglayan |
| 2 | | Manuel Agyao | June 30, 2007 | June 30, 2016 | 16th Congress | Liberal | Re-elected in 2013. | 1995–present Balbalan, Lubuagan, Pasil, Pinukpuk, Rizal, Tabuk, Tanudan, Tinglayan |
| 3 | | Allen Jesse Mangaoang | June 30, 2016 | June 30, 2025 | 17th Congress | Nacionalista | Elected in 2016. | 1995–present Balbalan, Lubuagan, Pasil, Pinukpuk, Rizal, Tabuk, Tanudan, Tinglayan |
| 3 | | Allen Jesse Mangaoang | June 30, 2016 | June 30, 2025 | 18th Congress | Nacionalista | Re-elected in 2019. | 1995–present Balbalan, Lubuagan, Pasil, Pinukpuk, Rizal, Tabuk, Tanudan, Tinglayan |
| 3 | | Allen Jesse Mangaoang | June 30, 2016 | June 30, 2025 | 19th Congress | Nacionalista | Re-elected in 2022. | 1995–present Balbalan, Lubuagan, Pasil, Pinukpuk, Rizal, Tabuk, Tanudan, Tinglayan |
| 4 | | Caroline Agyao | June 30, 2025 | Incumbent | 20th Congress | PFP | Elected in 2025. | 1995–present Balbalan, Lubuagan, Pasil, Pinukpuk, Rizal, Tabuk, Tanudan, Tinglayan |

== Election results ==
=== 1998 ===
1998 Philippine House of Representatives elections in Kalinga
| Party | Candidate | Votes | % |
|---|---|---|---|
| Lakas | Lawrence Wacnang | 27,648 | 44.76 |
| LAMMP | Macario Duguiang | 21,644 | 35.04 |
| KBL | Warren Luyaben | 12,328 | 19.96 |
| PDP–Laban | Mencio Sapitan | 147 | 0.24 |
| Total votes | | 61,767 | 100.00 |
| Lakas win (new seat) | | | |

=== 2010 ===
2010 Philippine House of Representatives elections in Kalinga
| Party | Candidate | Votes | % |
|---|---|---|---|
| Lakas–Kampi | Manuel Agyao (incumbent) | 71,255 | 74.99 |
| Liberal | James Bejarin | 23,769 | 25.01 |
| Total votes | | 95,024 | 100.00 |
| Lakas–Kampi hold | | | |

=== 2013 ===
2013 Philippine House of Representatives elections in Kalinga
| Party | Candidate | Votes | % |
|---|---|---|---|
| Liberal | Manuel Agyao (incumbent) | 46,930 | — |
| UNA | Macario Duguiang | 22,968 | — |
| Liberal hold | | | |

=== 2016 ===
2016 Philippine House of Representatives elections in Kalinga
| Party | Candidate | Votes | % |
|---|---|---|---|
| Liberal | Allen Jesse Mangaoang | 54,006 | 55.73 |
| NPC | Camilo Lammawin | 42,176 | 43.52 |
| Independent | Carlos Duyan | 728 | 0.75 |
| Total votes | | 96,910 | 100.00 |
| Liberal hold | | | |

=== 2019 ===
2019 Philippine House of Representatives elections in Kalinga
| Party | Candidate | Votes | % |
|---|---|---|---|
| Nacionalista | Allen Jesse Mangaoang (incumbent) | 58,753 | 52.83 |
| PDP–Laban | Jocel Baac | 52,452 | 47.17 |
| Total votes | | 111,205 | 100.00 |
| Nacionalista hold | | | |

=== 2022 ===
2022 Philippine House of Representatives elections in Kalinga
| Party | Candidate | Votes | % |
|---|---|---|---|
| Nacionalista | Allen Jesse Mangaoang (incumbent) | 94,430 | 76.05 |
| Independent | Roy Dickpus | 29,744 | 23.95 |
| Total votes | | 124,174 | 100.00 |
| Nacionalista hold | | | |

=== 2025 ===
2025 Philippine House of Representatives elections in Kalinga
| Party | Candidate | Votes | % |
|---|---|---|---|
| PFP | Caroline Agyao | 60,419 | 43.98 |
| NPC | Steve Ludan | 39,688 | 28.89 |
| Independent | Sacrament Gumilab | 37,286 | 27.14 |
| Total votes | | 137,393 | 100.00 |
| PFP gain from Nacionalista | | | |

== See also ==
- Legislative districts of Kalinga
