= 2025 Zambales local elections =

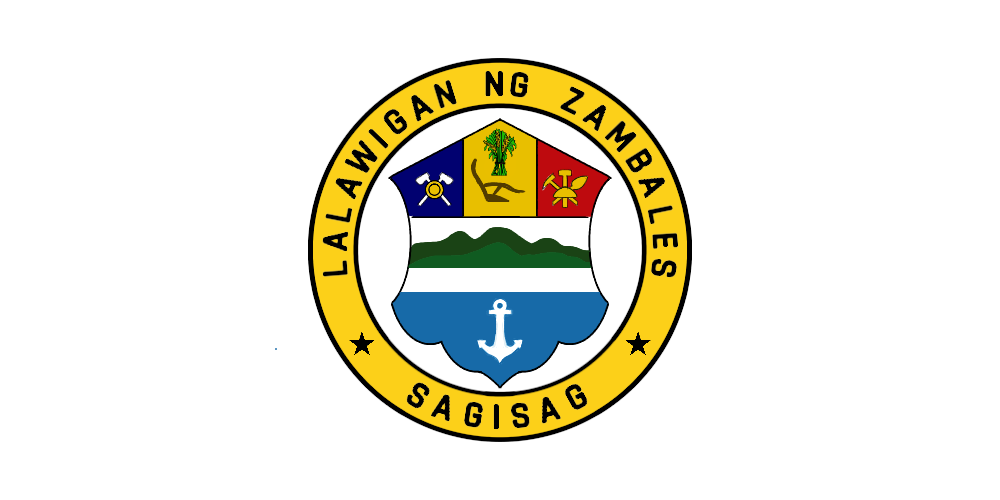
- May 12, 2025
- Gubernatorial election
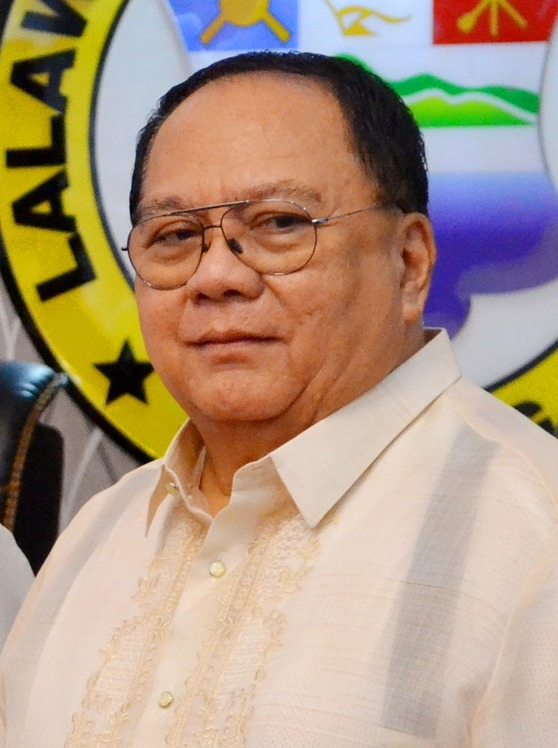
		IND
Candidate	Hermogenes Ebdane	Chito Bulatao Balintay
Party	SZP	Independent
Running mate	Jaq Khonghun	None
Popular vote	306,367	30,857
Percentage	90.85	9.15
Governor before election
Hermogenes Ebdane
SZP
Elected Governor
Hermogenes Ebdane
SZP
- Vice gubernatorial election
	Lakas
Candidate	Jaq Khonghun
Party	Lakas
Popular vote	279,807
Percentage	100.00
Vice Governor before election
Jaq Khonghun
Lakas
Elected Vice Governor
Jaq Khonghun
Lakas
- Provincial Board election

10 out of 14 seats in the Zambales Provincial Board 8 seats needed for a majority
	First party	Second party
Party	SZP	NPC
Last election	10 seats, 100.00%	0 seats, 0.00%
Seats won	9	1
Seat change	▼1	▲1
Popular vote	987,826	158,433
Percentage	80.12	12.85

Local elections were held in Zambales on May 12, 2025, as part of the 2025 Philippine general election. Zambales voters will elect a governor, a vice governor, and 10 out of 14 members of the Zambales Provincial Board.

== Governor ==
Incumbent Hermogenes Ebdane (Sulong Zambales Party) is running for a third term. Ebdane was re-elected with 59.69% of the vote in 2022.

=== Candidates ===
The following candidates are included in the ballot:

No.	Candidate	Party
1	Chito Bulatao Balintay	Independent
2	Hermogenes Ebdane (incumbent)	Sulong Zambales Party

Chito Bulatao Balintay was initially declared to be a nuisance candidate by the Commission on Elections. However, the Supreme Court ordered on January 14, 2025, to include Balintay in the ballot.

=== Results ===
Candidate	Party	Votes	%
Hermogenes Ebdane (incumbent)	Sulong Zambales Party	306,367	90.85
Chito Bulatao Balintay	Independent	30,857	9.15
Total		337,224	100.00
Valid votes		337,224	92.41
Invalid/blank votes		27,701	7.59
Total votes		364,925	100.00
Registered voters/turnout		429,237	85.02
Sulong Zambales Party hold			
Source: Commission on Elections

== Vice governor ==
Incumbent Jaq Khonghun (Lakas–CMD) is running for a second term unopposed. Khonghun was elected under Aksyon Demokratiko with 70.53% of the vote in 2022.

=== Candidates ===
The following candidates are included in the ballot:

No.	Candidate	Party
1	Jaq Khonghun (incumbent)	Lakas–CMD

=== Results ===
Candidate	Party	Votes	%
Jaq Khonghun (incumbent)	Lakas–CMD	279,807	100.00
Total		279,807	100.00
Valid votes		279,807	76.68
Invalid/blank votes		85,118	23.32
Total votes		364,925	100.00
Registered voters/turnout		429,237	85.02
Lakas–CMD hold			
Source: Commission on Elections

== Provincial Board ==
The Zambales Provincial Board is composed of 14 board members, 10 of whom are elected.

=== Retiring and term-limited board members ===
The following board member is retiring:

- Jun Pangan (Sulong Zambales Party, 2nd provincial district)

The following board members are term-limited:

- John-john Felarca (Sulong Zambales Party, 1st provincial district)
- King Gutierrez (Sulong Zambales Party, 1st provincial district)

=== Overview ===
Party	Votes	%	Seats	+/–
Sulong Zambales Party	987,826	80.12	9	+1
Nationalist People's Coalition	158,433	12.85	1	+1
Independent	86,676	7.03	0	0
Total	1,232,935	100.00	10	0
Total votes	364,925	–		
Registered voters/turnout	429,237	85.02		
Source: Commission on Elections

=== 1st provincial district ===
Zambales's 1st provincial district consists of the same area as Zambales's 1st legislative district, excluding Olongapo. Three board members are elected from this provincial district.

==== Candidates ====
The following candidates are included in the ballot:

No.	Candidate	Party
1	Ike Delgado (incumbent)	Sulong Zambales Party
2	Cecil Felarca-Rafanan	Sulong Zambales Party
3	Elmer Tumaca	Sulong Zambales Party

==== Results ====
Candidate	Party	Votes	%
Cecil Felarca-Rafanan	Sulong Zambales Party	68,244	35.88
Ike Delgado (incumbent)	Sulong Zambales Party	64,243	33.77
Elmer Tumaca	Sulong Zambales Party	57,734	30.35
Total		190,221	100.00
Total votes		104,809	–
Registered voters/turnout		130,418	80.36
Source: Commission on Elections

=== 2nd provincial district ===
Zambales's 2nd provincial district consists of the same area as Zambales's 2nd legislative district. Seven board members are elected from this provincial district.

==== Candidates ====
The following candidates are included in the ballot:

No.	Candidate	Party
1	Sancho Abasta III (incumbent)	Sulong Zambales Party
2	Sam Ablola (incumbent)	Sulong Zambales Party
3	Reena Mae Collado (incumbent)	Sulong Zambales Party
4	Jury Deloso	Nationalist People's Coalition
5	Rundy Ebdane (incumbent)	Sulong Zambales Party
6	Jap Fallorin	Nationalist People's Coalition
7	Noel Ferrer	Independent
8	Eric Matibag	Sulong Zambales Party
9	Lugil Ragadio (incumbent)	Sulong Zambales Party
10	Reynaldo Tarongoy (incumbent)	Sulong Zambales Party

==== Results ====
Candidate	Party	Votes	%
Rundy Ebdane (incumbent)	Sulong Zambales Party	158,804	15.23
Reena Mae Collado (incumbent)	Sulong Zambales Party	137,615	13.20
Sam Ablola (incumbent)	Sulong Zambales Party	123,806	11.87
Jury Deloso	Nationalist People's Coalition	112,502	10.79
Sancho Abasta III (incumbent)	Sulong Zambales Party	110,623	10.61
Eric Matibag	Sulong Zambales Party	100,127	9.60
Reynaldo Tarongoy (incumbent)	Sulong Zambales Party	86,847	8.33
Noel Ferrer	Independent	86,676	8.31
Lugil Ragadio (incumbent)	Sulong Zambales Party	79,783	7.65
Jap Fallorin	Nationalist People's Coalition	45,931	4.40
Total		1,042,714	100.00
Total votes		260,116	–
Registered voters/turnout		298,819	87.05
Source: Commission on Elections
