= Governor of Zambales =

Local chief executive

Governor of Province of Zambales
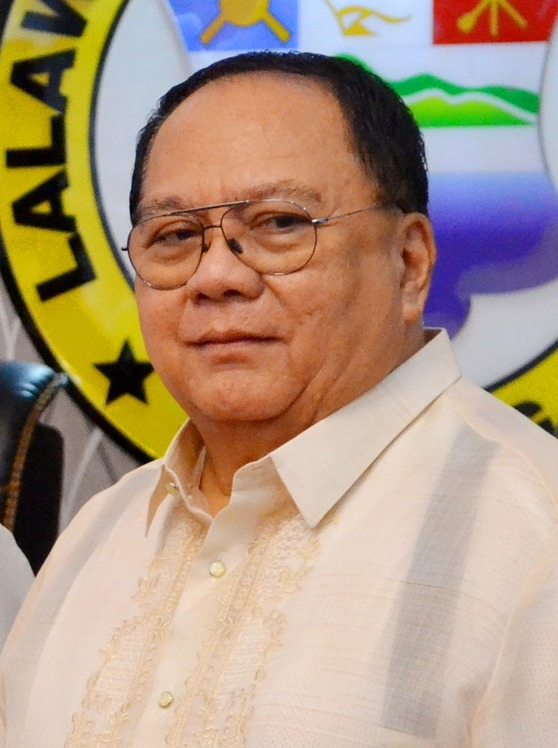
- Incumbent; Hermogenes Ebdane since June 30, 2019
- Style: The Honorable
- Seat: Zambales Provincial Capitol
- Term length: Three years, can succeed self three times
- Inaugural holder: Manuel de Orendin (Spanish administration); Potenciano Lesaca (Civil Government)
- Formation: 1802 (start of the Spanish administration); 1901 (start of the Civil Government by virtue of Philippine Commission Provincial Government Act)
- Deputy: Jacqueline Khonghun

The governor of the Province of Zambales is the head of the executive branch of Zambales Provincial Government, Philippines.

On May 13, 2019, Hermogenes Ebdane defeated incumbent Governor Amor Deloso. He assumed office on June 30, 2019.

== List of governors of Zambales ==
=== Spanish era ===
- Manuel de Orendin (1802)
- Miguel del Fierro (1809)
- Prudencio Perez de Menor (1842)
- Jose M. Rodriguez (1846)
- Jose Sanchez (1848)
- Hipolito Fortacion (1852)
- Laureano de Caray (1869)

=== First Republic ===
- Vicente Camara (Revolutionary Government of Gen. Emilio Aguinaldo) (1897–1899)

=== American era ===
#	Portrait	Governor	Term in office	Party	Vice-Governor
1		Potenciano Lesaca	1901–1903	Independent	None
2		Juan Manday	1903–1904		None
Act		Gabriel Alba	1904		None
3		Juan Lesaca	1910–1916		None
4		Lauro Al Barretto	1916–1918		None
Act		Cleto Arnedo	1918–1919		None
5		Dr. Benedicto T. Esguerra	1919–1922		None
6		Ramon Garcia	1922–1925		None
7		Francisco Dantes	1925–1931		None
8		Agustin N. Medina	1931–1934		None
9		Bernardo Farrales	1934–1940	Nacionalista	None
10		Francisco Adelantar Anonas	1940–1941		None

=== Japanese occupation ===
#	Portrait	Governor	Took office	Left office	Party	Vice-Governor
(7)		Francisco Dantes	March 29, 1942	March 30, 1943	KALIBAPI	None
11		Jose V. Corpuz	January 1, 1944	January 31, 1945	KALIBAPI	None

=== Present-day governors ===
#	Portrait	Governor	Took office	Left office	Party	Vice-Governor	Terms	Reference
12		Ramon Magsaysay	February 1, 1945	March 6, 1945	None	None	1	
(10)		Francisco Adelantar Anonas	March 7, 1945	December 31, 1947	Unknown	None	3	
13		Guillermo delos Reyes	1948	1951	Unknown	None	1	
14		Archimedes Villanueva	December 30, 1951	December 30, 1955	Unknown	None	1	
15		Manuel D. Barretto	December 30, 1955	December 30, 1967	Nacionalista (1955–1962)	Quirico Abrajano (1955–1959)	3	
15		Manuel D. Barretto	December 30, 1955	December 30, 1967	Nacionalista (1955–1962)	Gregorio Dolojan (1959–1963)	3	
15		Manuel D. Barretto	December 30, 1955	December 30, 1967	Liberal (1962–1967)	Gregorio Dolojan (1959–1963)	3	
15		Manuel D. Barretto	December 30, 1955	December 30, 1967	Liberal (1962–1967)	Quirico Abrajano (1963–1967)	3	
16		Vicente Magsaysay	December 30, 1967	1978	Nacionalista Party	Antonio M. Diaz (1967–1971)	2	
16		Vicente Magsaysay	December 30, 1967	1978	Nacionalista Party	Tiburcio Edaño Jr. (1971–1978)	2	
Act		Jacobo F. Battad (Acting)	1978		Unknown	Unknown		
(16)		Vicente Magsaysay	1978	1986	Kilusang Bagong Lipunan	Unknown		
17		Amor D. Deloso (Officer-In-Charge)	April 14, 1986	November 30, 1987	Liberal Party	Unknown		
Act		Luperio F. Villanueva	December 1, 1987	February 1, 1988	Unknown	Unknown		
(17)		Amor D. Deloso	February 2, 1988	March 4, 1998	Liberal Party	Saturnino Bactad	3	
Act		Saturnino Bactad	March 5, 1998	June 30, 1998	Liberal Party	(Vacant)	1	
(16)		Vicente Magsaysay	June 30, 1998	June 30, 2007	Lakas–CMD	Cheryl Deloso (1998–2001)	3	
(16)		Vicente Magsaysay	June 30, 1998	June 30, 2007	Lakas–CMD	Ramon Lacbain II (2001–2007)	3	
(17)		Amor D. Deloso	June 30, 2007	June 30, 2010	Liberal Party	Anne Marie Gordon	1	
18		Hermogenes Ebdane Jr.	June 30, 2010	June 30, 2016	Sulong Zambales Party	Ramon Lacbain II	2	
(17)		Amor D. Deloso	June 30, 2016	June 30, 2019	Liberal Party	Angel Magsaysay-Cheng	1	
(18)		Hermogenes Ebdane Jr.	June 30, 2019	Incumbent	PDP–Laban	Jay Khonghun (2019–2022)	3	
(18)		Hermogenes Ebdane Jr.	June 30, 2019	Incumbent	Partido Federal ng Pilipinas	Jacqueline Khonghun (2022–present)	3	

== Elections ==
- 1988 Zambales local elections
- 1992 Zambales local elections
- 1995 Zambales local elections
- 1998 Zambales local elections
- 2001 Zambales local elections
- 2004 Zambales local elections
- 2007 Zambales local elections
- 2010 Zambales local elections
- 2013 Zambales local elections
- 2016 Zambales local elections
- 2019 Zambales local elections
- 2022 Zambales local elections
- 2025 Zambales local elections
