= Mayor of Tabuk, Kalinga =

Mayor of Tabuk City
- Incumbent; Dick G. Bal-o (acting) since October 3, 2023
- Appointer: Elected via popular vote
- Term length: 3 years
- Formation: 1936

The mayor of Tabuk (Filipino: Punong Lungsod ng Tabuk) is the head of the local government of the city of Tabuk City, Kalinga who is elected to three year terms. The Mayor is also the executive head and leads the city's departments in executing the city ordinances and improving public services. The city mayor is restricted to three consecutive terms, totaling nine years, although a mayor can be elected again after an interruption of one term.

== Municipal Mayors (1936-2011) ==
	Mayor	Term
1	Baac Gullit	1936–1937
2	Jose Daodaoen	1938–1939
3	Francisco Viloria	1940
4	Tangkib	1941–1943
5	Agustin Castro	1944–1945; 1948-1951; 1954-1955
6	Pio Albert	1946–1947
7	Miguel Buslig Sr.	1952–1953
8	Jaime Quirino	1956–1968; 1981-1987
9	Ricarte Quinsaat	1968–1980
10	Rommel Diasen	1988–1998
11	Basilio Wandag	1998–2001
12	Camilo T. Lammawin Jr.	2001–2010

== City mayors (since 2011) ==
	Mayor	Term
1	Ferdinand B. Tubban	2010–2019
2	Darwin C. Estrañero	2019–2023
3	Dick G. Bal-o (acting)	2023–present
