= Potenciano Lesaca =

Filipino politician and businessman (1871-1941)

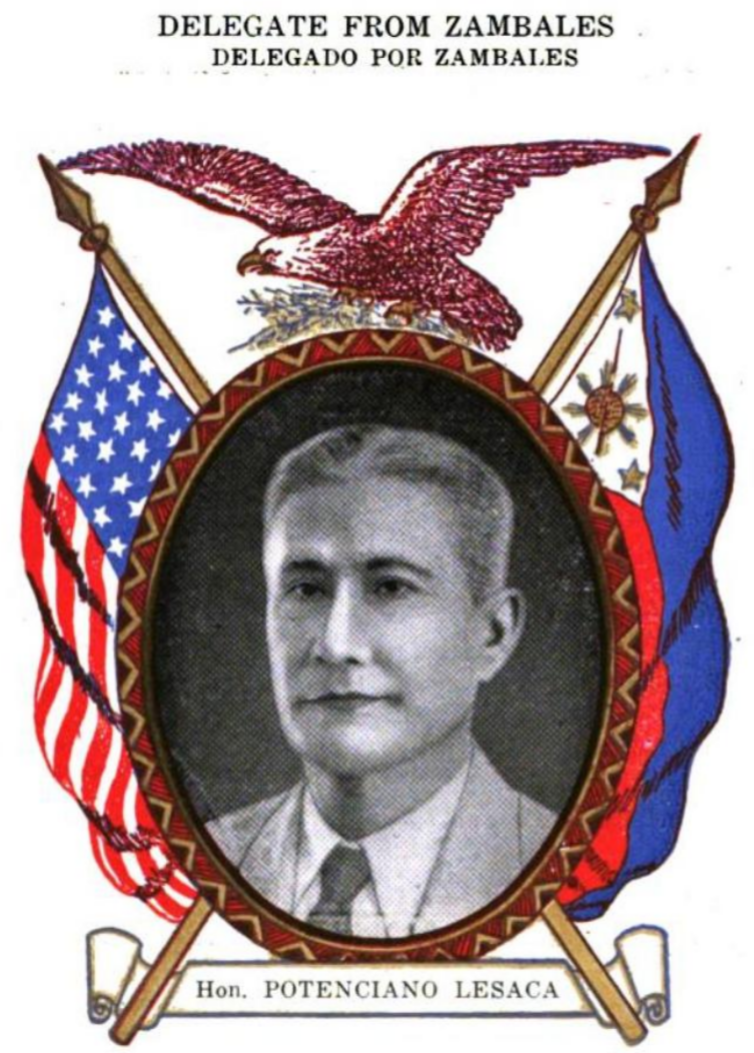
- Lesaca as Delegate to the 1934 Philippine Constitutional Convention, published by Benipayo Press, c. 1935

1st Governor of Zambales
- In office 1901–1903
- Preceded by: Office established
- Succeeded by: Juan Manday

Member of the National Assembly from Zambales's Lone District
- In office September 16, 1935 – December 30, 1938
- Preceded by: Felipe Estella
- Succeeded by: Valentín S. Afable

Delegate for the 1934 Philippine Constitutional Convention
- In office 1934–1935

Personal details
- Born: January 1, 1871 Botolan, Zambales, Captaincy General of the Philippines
- Died: October 4, 1941 (aged 70) Philippine Commonwealth
- Occupation: Politician, Agriculturist
- Known for: First Civil Governor of Zambales, Delegate to the 1934 Constitutional Convention

Potenciano Lesaca y García (January 1, 1871 (Note: some early American colonial era documents put his birth date in 1872) – October 4, 1941) was a Filipino politician, revolutionary, and legislator who served as the first civil governor of Zambales from 1901 to 1903. He later became a delegate to the 1934 Philippine Constitutional Convention and served in the 1st National Assembly of the Philippines (1935–1938).

== Early life and career ==
Born on 1 January 1871, in Botolan, Zambales, Philippines, the son of Luis Lesaca y Navarro and Juana García y Abellana. His father was the son of Fray Mariano Tutor de San José from Ólvega, Soria, Castile and León, Spain. he became the first civil governor of Zambales, a province of the Philippines in the Central Luzon region.

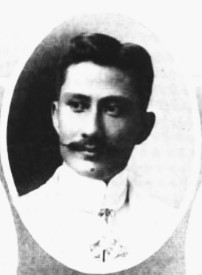
Lesaca as governor of Zambales, published c. 1905, by the United States Bureau of the Census

He completed his course on commerce in 1898 at Ateneo de Manila. He first worked as a census inspector and later president of the commission which installed the civil government of Zambales. He was an honorary member of the mission that represented the Philippine Islands in the Universal Exposition at St Louis Missouri in 1904. During the Philippine Revolution, he was a major under General Antonio Luna. He was considered as an expert accountant and youngest of the provincial governors by American authorities.

I can therefore affirm that public administration in all its branches has been carried on with regularity and with favorable results ever since it was established, on August 28, 1901, under civil régime, and until the 31st of December, and will add that the political conditions, under their different aspects, are good and favorable...

— Potenciano Lesaca, Annual Report of Potenciano Lesaca, Governor of the Province of Zambales (January 13, 1902)

Lesaca was married to Irene Gonzales and had nine children. He later became a landowner, farmer, and a stockman.

== Political career ==
Lesaca in his later years

From 1935 to 1938, he represented Zambales at the 1st National Assembly of the Philippines. This meeting of the legislature of the Commonwealth of the Philippines passed a total of 415 laws. As a lawmaker, Lesaca had interests in the agricultural industry, specifically livestock.

== Death ==
He died on October 4, 1941, months before the Japanese invasion of the Philippines.

== Selected publications ==
- Report on the Negritos of Zambales (1901)
- Report of the Supervisor of the Census for the Province of Zambales (1903)
