= Ferdinand Tubban =

Filipino politician

The Honorable Ferdinand Tubban
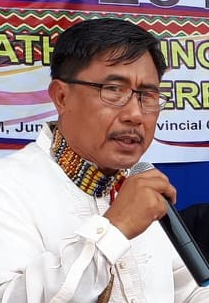

Governor of Kalinga
- In office June 30, 2019 – June 30, 2022
- President: Rodrigo Duterte
- Vice Governor: Dave Odiem
- Preceded by: Jocel Baac
- Succeeded by: James Edduba

Mayor of Tabuk, Kalinga
- In office June 30, 2010 – June 30, 2019
- Preceded by: Camilo Lammawin
- Succeeded by: Darwin C. Estrañero

Personal details
- Born: May 6, 1964 (age 61) Tabuk, Mountain Province, Philippines
- Party: Aksyon Demokratiko (2024-present)
- Other political affiliations: PDP (2018-2024); Liberal (2015-2018); Nacionalista (2009-2015)

Ferdinand Baac Tubban is a Filipino politician from the province of Kalinga in the Philippines. He is a former Governor of Kalinga. He was first elected as Mayor of Tabuk and served there for three terms.

== Election protest ==
He is the first Governor of the province to be elected under protest. In the 2019 Philippine general election on May 13, 2019, he defeated the then Vice Governor James Edduba by just ten votes.

Edduba filed an appeal before the Commission on Elections against Tubban. In February, 2020, the motion filed by Edubba before the Commission on Elections showed that Edduba recovered a net of seven votes, which is more than the required “substantial recovery” of 20 percent. Aside from the seven votes, the former vice governor had a total of 20 claimed ballots in his favor, which is more than enough to offset the winning margin of Tubban in the 2019 polls. Edduba, who ran under the Lakas Christian Muslim Democrats party, now has a winning margin of 17 votes. As of September 28, 2020, the case is pending before the Commission on Election. He eventually lost his reelection bid in the May 9, 2022 Philippine general election to Edduba.

== 2025 election ==
Tubban is running for vice mayor of Tabuk in the 2025 Philippine general election.
