= Governor of Kalinga =

Local chief executive

Provincial Governor of Kalinga
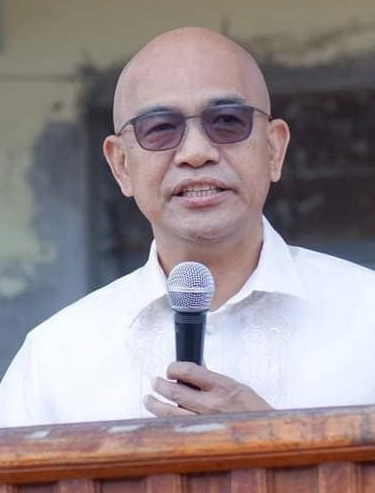
- Incumbent; James S. Edduba since June 30, 2022
- Appointer: Elected via popular vote
- Term length: 3 years
- Inaugural holder: Lawrence Wacnang
- Formation: 1995

The governor of Kalinga (Filipino: Punong Panlalawigan ng Kalinga) is the chief executive of the provincial government of Kalinga.

== Provincial Governors of Kalinga-Apayao (1966-1995) ==
No.	Image	Name	Year in office
1		Ceferino B. Ramirez	1967
2		Juan M. Duyan	1968
3		Amado B. Almazan	1968-1971
4		Rolando T. Puzon	1972-1976
5		Tanding D. Odiem	1976-1978
(3)		Amado B. Almazan	1978-1986
6		William F. Claver	1986-1987
7		Laurence B. Wacnang	1987
8		Basilio A. Wandag	1987-1988
(7)		Laurence B. Wacnang	1988-1995

== Provincial Governors of Kalinga (1995-present) ==
No.	Image	Name	Year in office
1		Laurence B. Wacnang	1995-1998
2		Dominador T. Belac	1998-2000
3		Jocel C. Baac	2000-2001
(2)		Dominador T. Belac	2001
4		Macario A. Duguiang	2001-2004
(2)		Dominador T. Belac	2004-2007
5		Floydelia R. Diasen	2007-2010
(3)		Jocel C. Baac	2010-2019
6		Ferdinand B. Tubban	2019-2022
7		James S. Edduba	2022-present
