= Malayang Kilusan ng Mamamayang Zambaleño =

Philippine political party

Malayang Kilusan ng Mamamayang Zambaleño (MAKIMAZA)
- President: Amor Deloso
- Headquarters: Botolan, Zambales
- National affiliation: Liberal (until 2018); NPC (2018-present)
- International affiliation: None
- Colors: Blue
- Senate: 0 / 24
- House of Representatives: 1 / 292
- Provincial governors: 1 / 81
- Provincial vice governors: 1 / 81
- Provincial board members: 2 / 1,006

Malayang Kilusan ng Mamamayang Zambaleño (MAKIMAZA; transl. Free Movement of the Citizens of Zambales) is a local political party in the Philippine province of Zambales. The Party was founded in 2018 by Zambales Governor Amor Deloso.
