= Palauig =

Municipality in Zambales, Philippines

- Municipality
- Municipality of Palauig
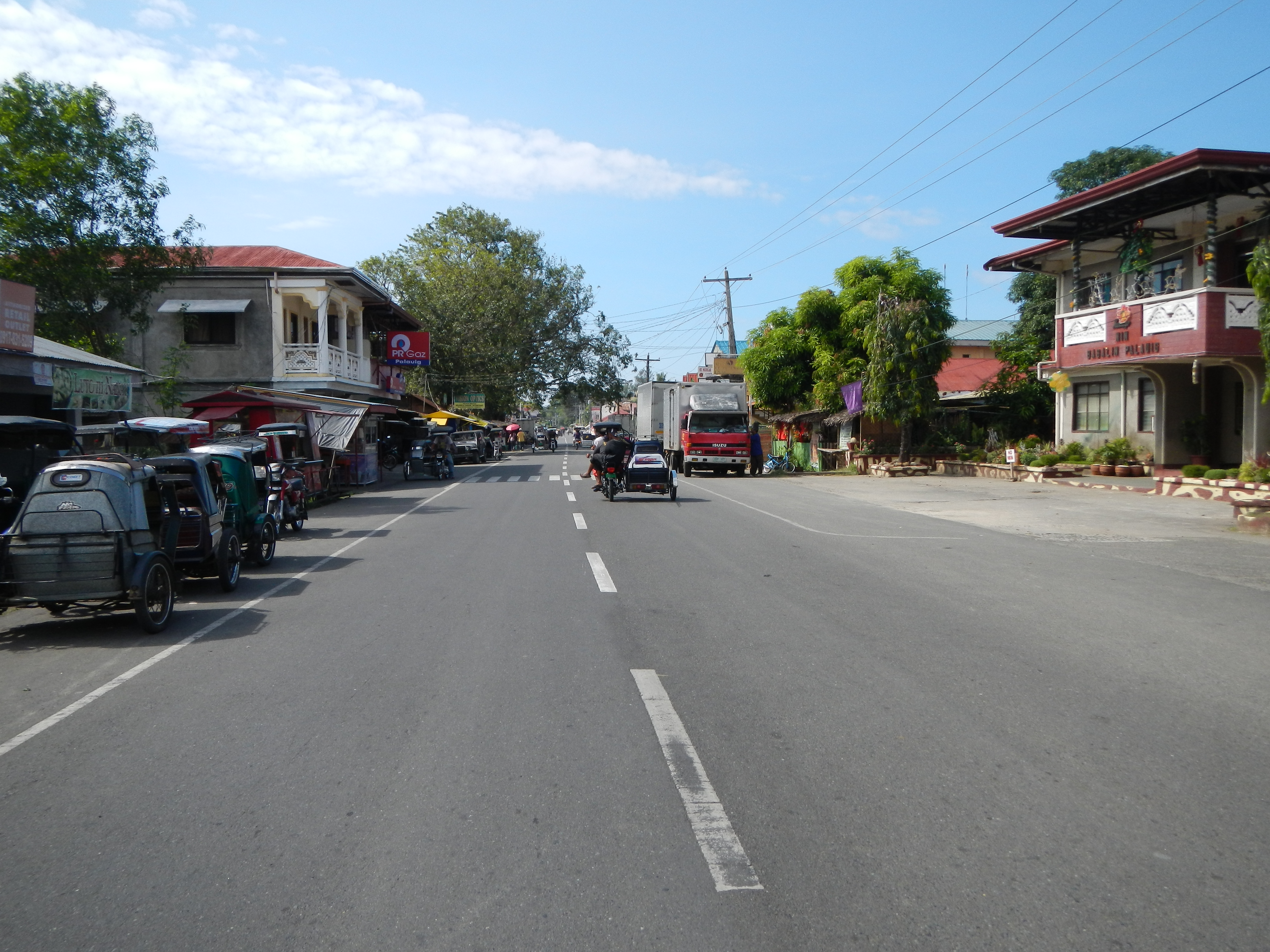
- Downtown area

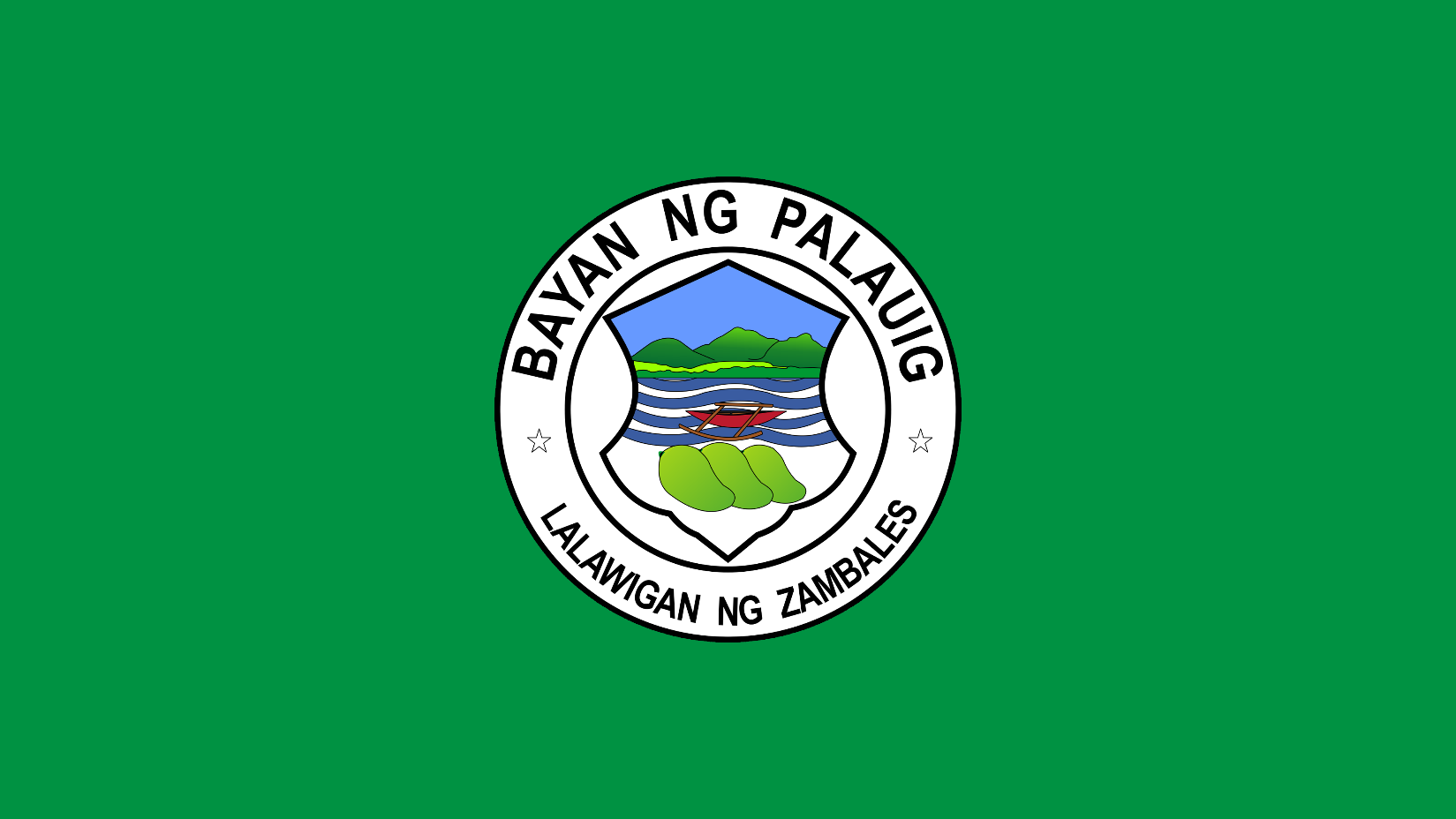
- Flag Seal

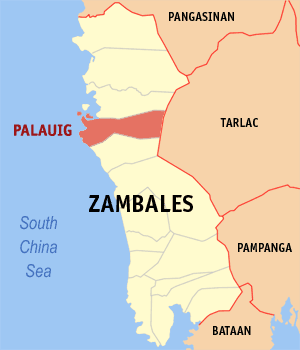
- Map of Zambales with Palauig highlighted
- Interactive map of Palauig
- Location within the Philippines
- Coordinates: 15°26′01″N 119°54′30″E
- Country: Philippines
- Region: Central Luzon
- Province: Zambales
- District: 2nd district
- Founded: 1870
- Reestablished: January 1, 1910
- Barangays: 19 (see Barangays)

Government
  - Type: Sangguniang Bayan
  - Mayor: Christian Daniel H. Aceron
  - Vice Mayor: Billy M. Aceron
  - Representative: Doris 'Nanay Bing' Maniquiz
  - Municipal Council: Members: Franklin T. Nacin; James Nicholas T. Aranda; Eric S. Alba; Bryan A. Anaud; Ferdinand T. Catolico; Fred M. Sevilla; Jeffrey G. Landero; Dan Gabriel B. Paradeza
  - Electorate: 28,607 voters (2025)

Area
  - Total: 310.00 km^{2} (119.69 sq mi)
- Elevation: 9.0 m (29.5 ft)
- Highest elevation: 2,037 m (6,683 ft)
- Lowest elevation: 0 m (0 ft)

Population (2024 census)
  - Total: 43,250
  - Density: 139.5/km^{2} (361.3/sq mi)
  - Households: 9,612

Economy
  - Income class: 1st municipal income class
  - Poverty incidence: 16.5% (2023)
  - Revenue: ₱ 276.5 million (2024)
  - Assets: ₱ 817.8 million (2024)
  - Expenditure: ₱ 249.2 million (2024)
  - Liabilities: ₱ 323.6 million (2024)

Service provider
  - Electricity: Zambales 1 Electric Cooperative (ZAMECO 1)
- Time zone: UTC+8 (PST)
- ZIP code: 2210
- PSGC: 0307108000
- IDD : area code: +63 (0)47
- Native languages: Sambal; Ilocano; Tagalog

Palauig, officially the Municipality of Palauig (Sambal: Babali nin Palauig; Ilocano: Ili ti Palauig; Filipino: Bayan ng Palauig), is a municipality in the province of Zambales, Philippines. According to the 2024 census, it has a population of 43,250 people.

The municipality of Palauig is the nearest mainland to the Philippine-claimed EEZ Panatag Shoal, or Scarborough Shoal, which the country places under Masinloc to the town’s north.

== Geography ==
Palauig is 14 km northwest of Iba, 77 km northwest of Olongapo, 80 km south of Alaminos, Pangasinan, and 148 km northwest of Manila. It is between Iba and Masinloc on the Olongapo–Bugallon Road.

=== Barangays ===
Palauig is politically subdivided into 19 barangays, as indicated below. Each barangay consists of puroks and some have sitios.

- Alwa
- Bato
- Bulawen
- Cauyan
- East Poblacion
- Garreta
- Libaba
- Liozon
- Lipay
- Locloc
- Macarang
- Magalawa
- Pangolingan
- Salaza
- San Juan
- Santo Niño
- Santo Tomas
- San Vicente
- West Poblacion

=== Climate ===
Climate data for Palauig, Zambales
Month	Jan	Feb	Mar	Apr	May	Jun	Jul	Aug	Sep	Oct	Nov	Dec	Year
Mean daily maximum °C (°F)	31 (88)	32 (90)	33 (91)	34 (93)	32 (90)	31 (88)	29 (84)	29 (84)	29 (84)	30 (86)	31 (88)	31 (88)	31 (88)
Mean daily minimum °C (°F)	20 (68)	20 (68)	21 (70)	23 (73)	25 (77)	25 (77)	25 (77)	25 (77)	24 (75)	23 (73)	22 (72)	20 (68)	23 (73)
Average precipitation mm (inches)	16 (0.6)	18 (0.7)	28 (1.1)	51 (2.0)	200 (7.9)	253 (10.0)	301 (11.9)	293 (11.5)	246 (9.7)	171 (6.7)	70 (2.8)	28 (1.1)	1,675 (66)
Average rainy days	6.2	7.1	10.4	15.5	24.4	26.4	28.2	27.5	26.2	23.6	15.9	8.7	220.1
Source: Meteoblue

== Demographics ==
Population census of Palauig
Year	Pop.	±% p.a.
1903	3,363	—
1918	4,406	+1.82%
1939	6,026	+1.50%
1948	8,386	+3.74%
1960	10,392	+1.80%
1970	14,546	+3.42%
1975	16,359	+2.38%
1980	17,176	+0.98%
1990	21,577	+2.31%
1995	26,794	+4.14%
2000	29,983	+2.44%
2007	30,747	+0.35%
2010	33,286	+2.93%
2015	34,947	+0.93%
2020	39,784	+2.77%
2024	43,250	+2.03%
Source: Philippine Statistics Authority

In the 2024 census, the population of Palauig was 43,250 people, with a density of 140 inhabitants per square kilometre or 360 inhabitants per square mile.

=== Language ===
Most of the citizens in the municipality speak Sambal followed by Ilocano and Tagalog.

== Economy ==
Poverty incidence of Palauig (%)

Source: Philippine Statistics Authority

== Government ==
=== Local government ===
At present, Palauig is headed by Mayor Christian Aceron , with the Municipal Council called Sangguniang Bayan with 8 members.

== Tourism ==
Palauig is home to the mountain climbing resort of Mount Tapulao. Because of cold climate on its summit similar to Baguio, it has become an attraction to many local and foreign mountaineering groups and tourists. The Municipal Tourism Authority of the Palauig Municipal Government also promotes the Magalawa Island Resort and Famous Beach Resorts along the coastal Barangay of Locloc.

== Education ==
The Palauig Schools District Office governs all educational institutions within the municipality. It oversees the management and operations of all private and public, from primary to secondary schools.

=== Primary and elementary schools ===
- A. P. Decano Memorial Elementary School
- Alwa Elementary School
- Aninzo-Arca Elementary School
- Anthony Arana Guatlo Elementary School
- Bato Elementary School
- Bulawen Elementary School
- Dampay Elementary School
- Dapla Elementary School
- Emiliano M. Aragon Memorial Elementary School
- Liozon Elementary School
- Lipay Elementary School
- Locloc Elementary School
- Luan Elementary School
- Magalawa Elementary School
- Manggahan Elementary School
- Palauig Central School
- Palauig-M Ecumenical School
- Pangolingan Elementary School
- San Vicente Elementary School
- Zacarias L. Antiller Elementary School

=== Secondary schools ===
- Locloc National High School
- Rofulo M. Landa High School
- Carmel Academy of Palauig Inc.
- Palawig Academy Educational Foundation
- Bulawen High School (Rofulo M. Landa High School extension)

== Gallery ==
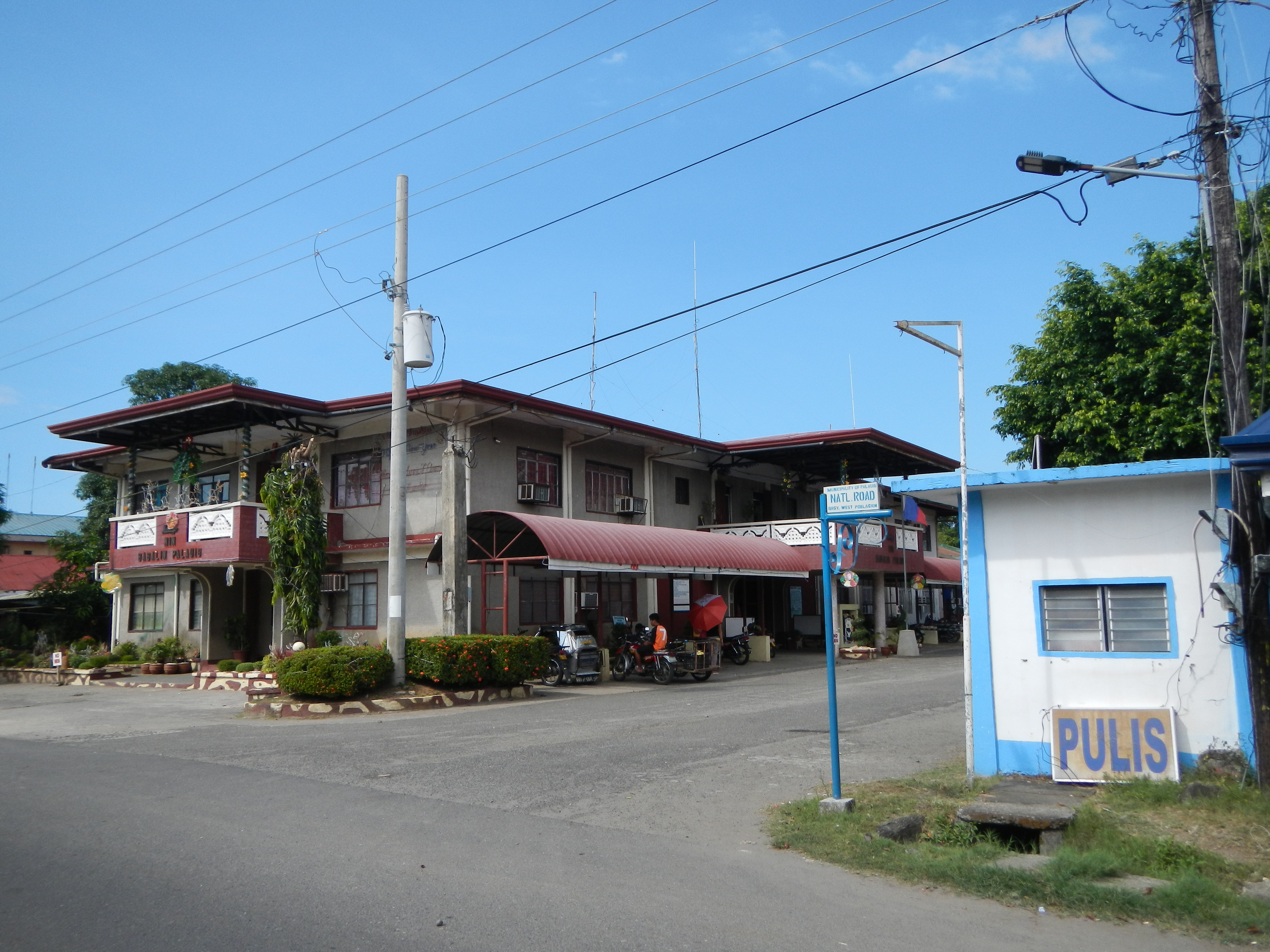
Municipal hall and police station

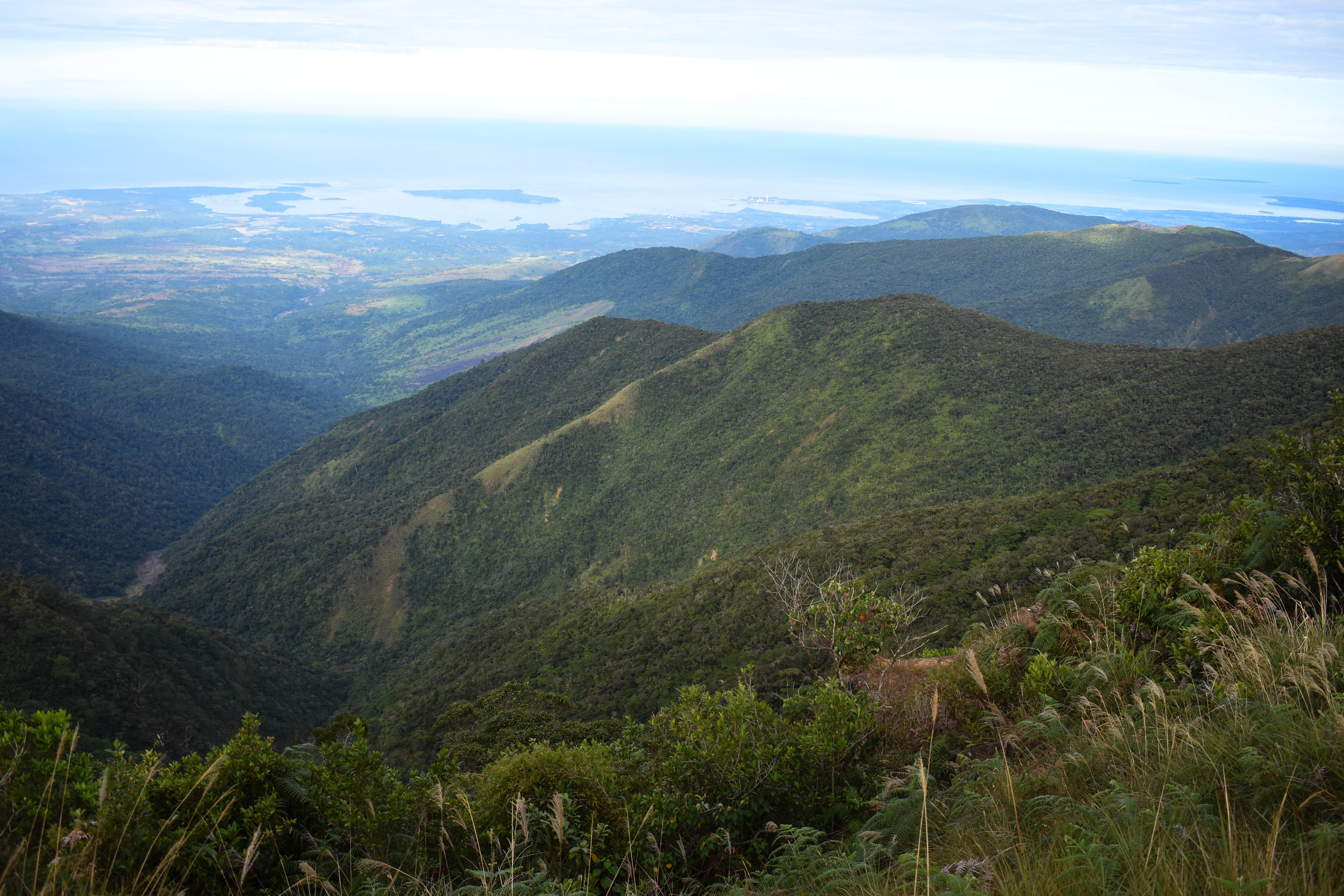
Mount Tapulao

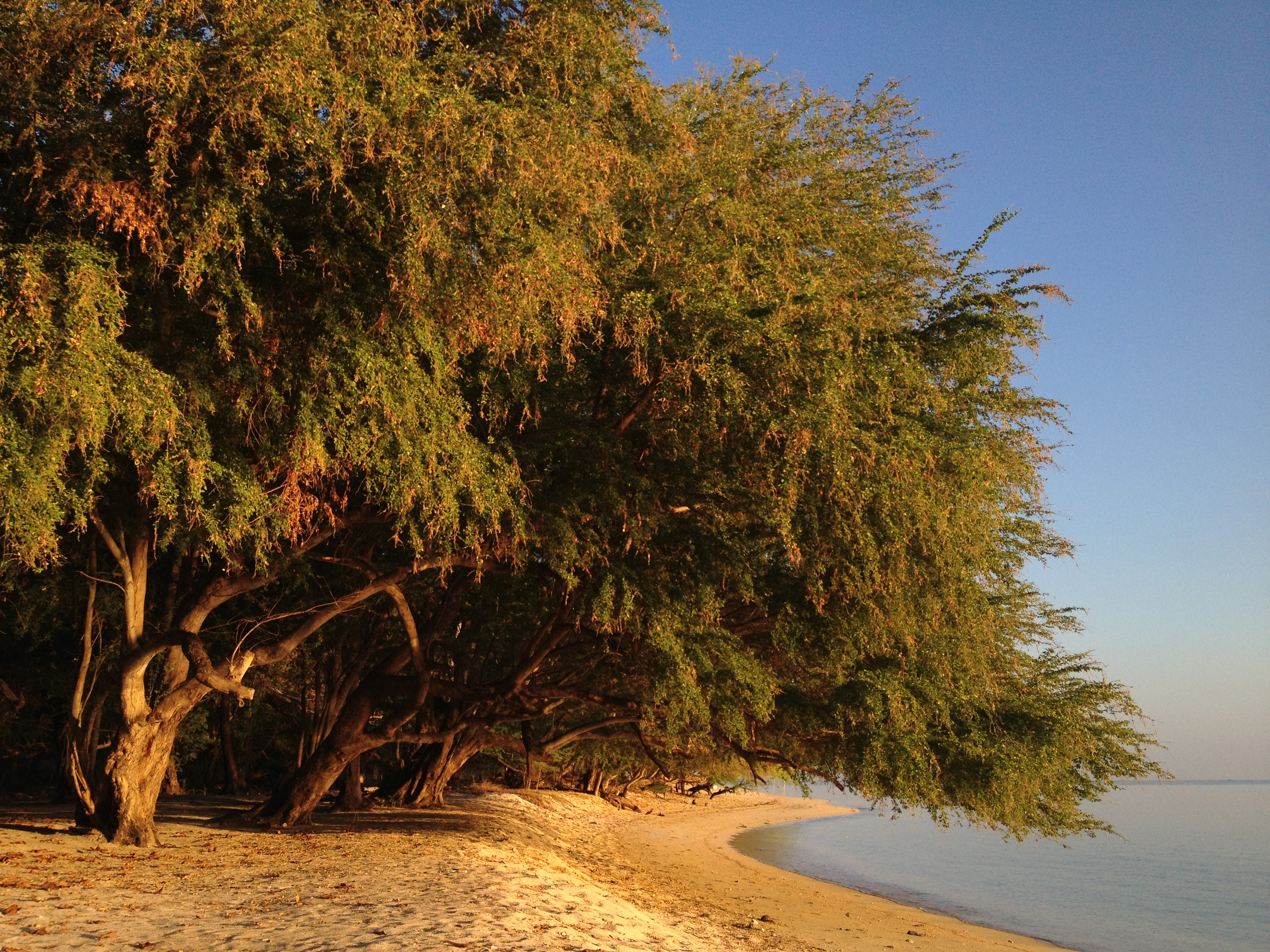
Magalawa Island

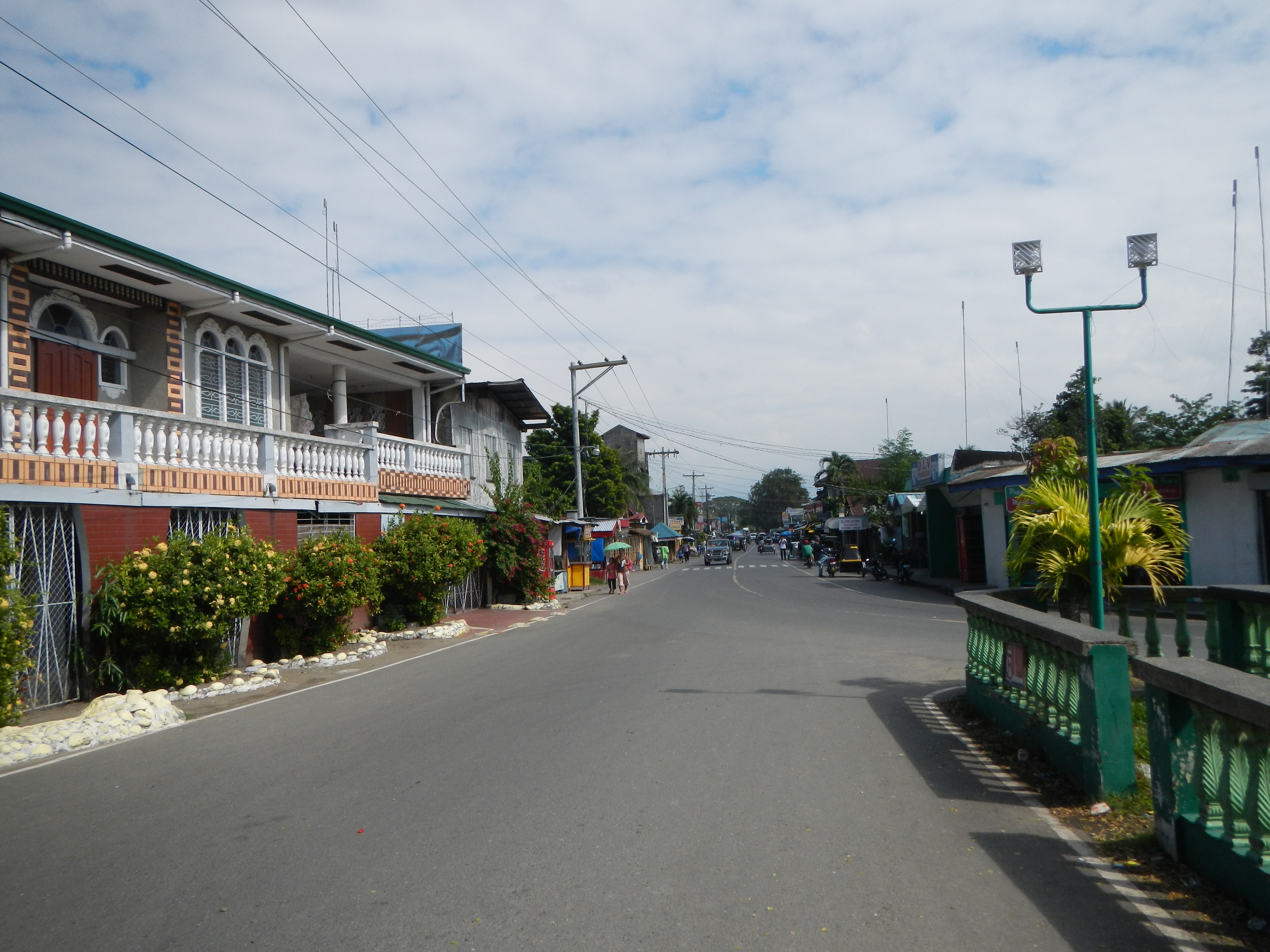
Town center

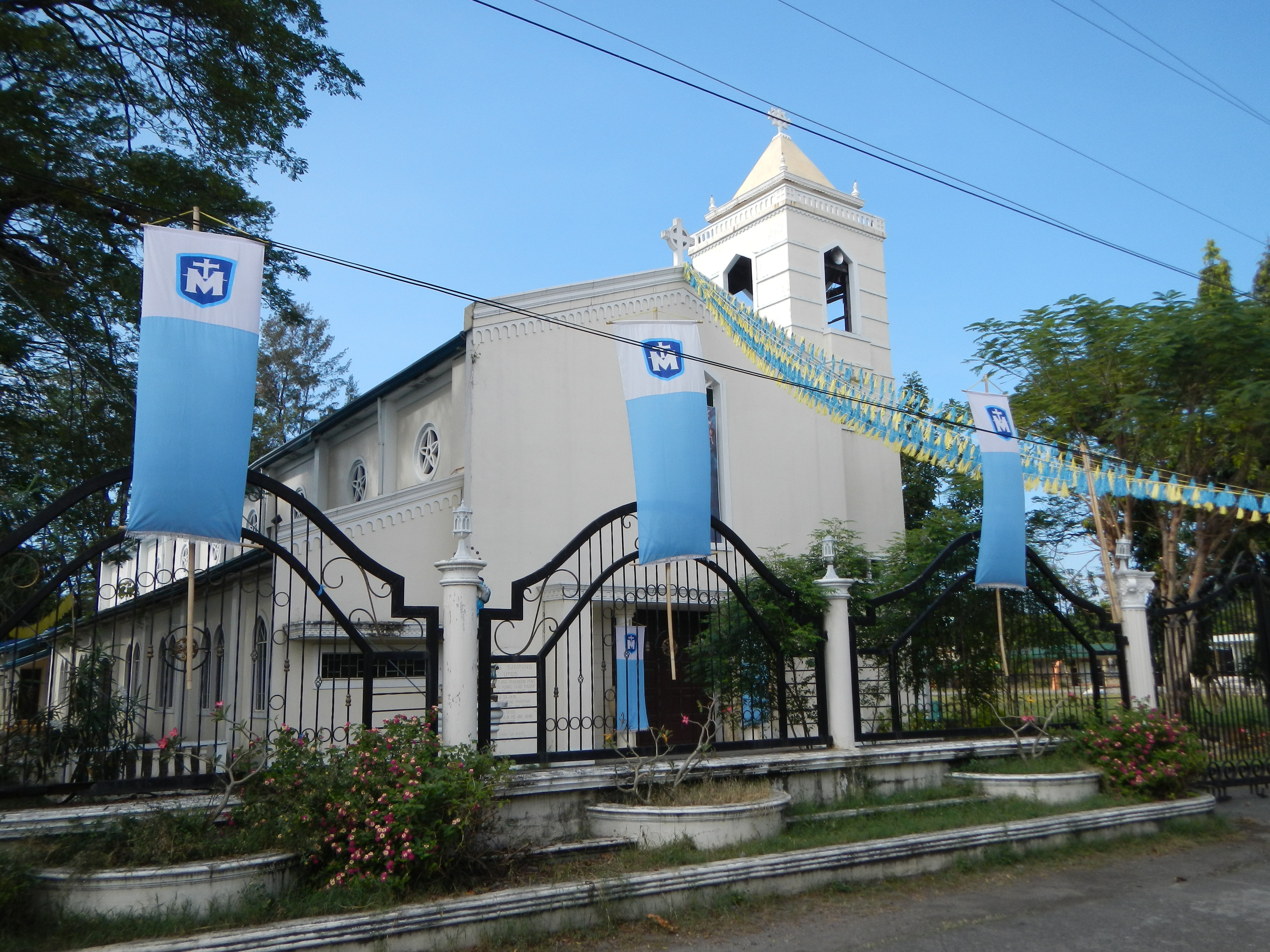
Parish of the Immaculate Conception
