= James Edduba =

Governor of Kalinga

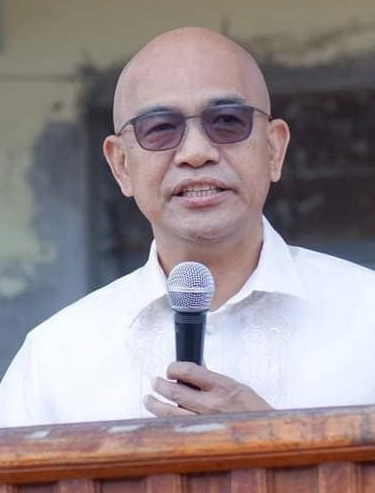

Governor of Kalinga
- Incumbent
- Assumed office June 30, 2022
- Vice Governor: Jocel Baac (2022–2025); Dave Odiem (2025–present)
- Preceded by: Ferdinand Tubban

Vice Governor of Kalinga
- In office June 30, 2016 – June 30, 2019
- Governor: Jocel Baac
- Preceded by: Allen Jesse Mangaoang
- Succeeded by: Dave Odiem

Mayor of Pasil
- In office June 30, 2007 – June 30, 2016

Personal details
- Born: James Sagmayao Edduba; February 20, 1965 (age 61) Pasil, Mountain Province, Philippines
- Party: Lakas (2008–present)
- Other political affiliations: KAMPI (2007–2008)
- Children: 5
- Occupation: Politician

James Edduba is a Filipino politician who is the Governor of Kalinga since 2022. Prior to this he served as mayor of Pasil and became vice governor of Kalinga. He is a member of the Lakas–CMD party.

== Early life ==
James Sagmayao Edduba was born in Pasil, Kalinga, his father was Juan Edduba and his mother is Zenaida Sagmayao Edduba, he went to college in San Sebastian College, Manila and received a Degree in Political Science on 1994.

== Career ==
He was elected Mayor of Pasil in 2007, and served for three terms. In 2014, he was injured in a gun attack in Tabuk after being involved in a road accident.

In 2016, he was elected as Vice Governor of Kalinga under the Lakas–CMD, gaining 44,705 votes. In 2019 he unsuccessfully ran for governor but lost to Ferdinand Tubban by 10 votes. Despite filing an electoral protest that resulted in a recount showing him leading by 17 votes, Edduba was unable to sit as governor due to legal appeals by Tubban. In 2022, Edduba ran again for governor and defeated Tubban with 60,070 votes. He ran for reelection in the 2025 Philippine general election and thus won.

== Personal life ==
Edduba has five children and is married to Elsie Edduba, an engineer from Lubuagan, Kalinga.
