= Jun Ebdane =

Filipino politician (born 1948)

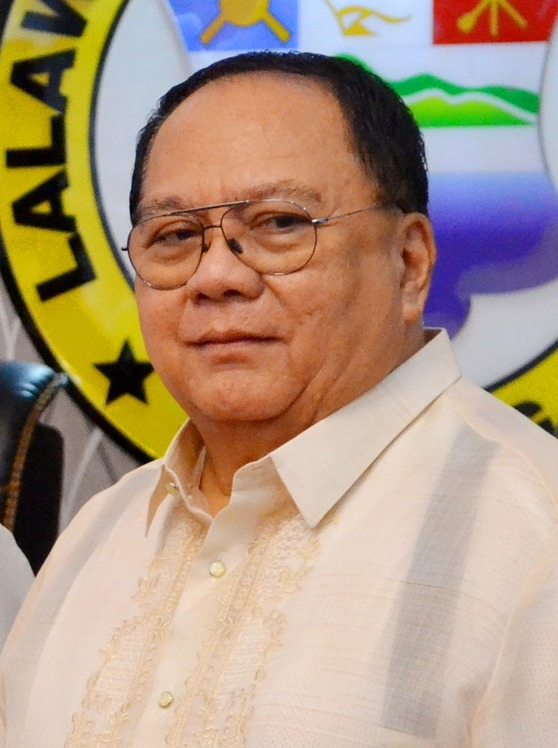
- Ebdane in 2023

18th Governor of Zambales
- Incumbent
- Assumed office June 30, 2019
- Vice Governor: Jay Khonghun (2019–2022); Jacqueline Khonghun (2022–present)
- Preceded by: Amor Deloso
- In office June 30, 2010 – June 30, 2016
- Vice Governor: Ramon Lacbain II
- Preceded by: Amor Deloso
- Succeeded by: Amor Deloso

36th Secretary of Public Works and Highways
- In office July 4, 2007 – October 22, 2009
- President: Gloria Macapagal Arroyo
- Preceded by: Manuel Bonoan (acting)
- Succeeded by: Victor F. Domingo
- In office February 15, 2005 – February 1, 2007
- President: Gloria Macapagal Arroyo
- Preceded by: Florante Soriquez (acting)
- Succeeded by: Manuel Bonoan (acting)

24th Secretary of National Defense
- In office February 1, 2007 – July 2, 2007
- President: Gloria Macapagal Arroyo
- Preceded by: Gloria Macapagal Arroyo
- Succeeded by: Norberto Gonzales (acting)

10th Chief of the Philippine National Police
- In office July 2002 – August 23, 2004
- President: Gloria Macapagal Arroyo
- Preceded by: Leandro Mendoza
- Succeeded by: Edgar Aglipay

District Director of the Western Police District
- In office November 5, 1993 – June 16, 1996
- Mayor: Alfredo S. Lim
- Preceded by: P/CSupt. Romeo O. Odi
- Succeeded by: P/CSupt. Avelino Razon Jr.

Personal details
- Born: Hermogenes Edejer Ebdane Jr. December 30, 1948 (age 77) Candelaria, Zambales, Philippines
- Party: PFP (2023–present); SZP (2012–present)
- Other political affiliations: PDP–Laban (2018–2023); Labor (2009–2018)
- Spouse: Alma Cabanayan
- Education: Philippine Military Academy (BS); Mapúa Institute of Technology (BS); Philippine College of Criminology (MA); Bicol University (Ph.D)
- Occupation: Police officer; Politician
- Police career
- Service: Philippine National Police
- Allegiance: Philippines
- Divisions: Special Action Force; National Capital Region Police Office; Western Police District
- Service years: 1970–2004
- Rank: Director General

Hermogenes "Jun" Edejer Ebdane, Jr. (born December 30, 1948) is a Filipino engineer, politician and retired police officer with the rank of Director General. He has been the Governor of Zambales since 2019, and previously held this position from 2010 until 2016. He was also the Secretary of the Department of Public Works and Highways from 2005 to February 2007 and from July 2007 to 2009.

He was a member of the Philippine Military Academy class of 1970, and has a Bachelor of Science in Civil Engineering (BSCE) from the Mapúa Institute of Technology.

== Police career ==
In the Mid-1990s, Ebdane served as PNP-NCR director and the 9th Chief of the Philippine National Police from July 2002 to August 23, 2004. After the escape from jail of Islamic militant Fathur Rohman al-Ghozi on July 14, 2003, Ebdane stated he would be satisfied with any recovery, including "even if he is dead and torn to pieces". He went to view the body after Al-Ghozi was shot dead by police on October 13, 2003, saying the militant was killed in a brief gunfight after opening fire at a military checkpoint. One of the demands of the Oakwood mutiny on July 27, 2003, was the resignation of Ebdane as national police chief, but the mutiny was unsuccessful and short-lived. He was chief of the PNP during the Hello Garci scandal and admitted to providing a vehicle to Virgilio Garcillano, but only when Garcillano was still with the Commission on Elections. He said violence for the May 2004 election was lower than in previous years.

== National security ==
After serving as the chief of the PNP, Ebdane was named National Security Adviser, a post he held from August 2004 to February 2005. In February 2005, he was appointed to a cabinet position as Secretary of Public Works and Highways, which he returned to in July 2007, after serving as Secretary of National Defense from February 2007.

== Educational life ==
- Bachelor of Science, Philippine Military Academy
- Bachelor of Science In Civil Engineering, Mapua Institute of Technology
- Master of Arts in Criminology, Philippine College of Criminology
- Doctor of Philosophy in Peace and Security Administration, Bicol University
- Senior-level courses and training
  - Command and General Staff Course, US Army Command and General Staff College
  - Incident Management Training, US Counter-Terrorist Training Group
  - Senior Crisis Management Course sponsored by the United States Department of State
  - Senior Police Officers course, Singapore Police Academy
  - Senior Police Executive Course, International Law Enforcement Academy in Thailand
  - Basic and Advance Intelligence Courses, National Intelligence Training Center, and the Special Intelligence Training School

== Electoral history ==
Electoral history of Jun Ebdane
| Year | Office | Party | | Votes received | | | | Result |
| Year | Office | Local | National | Total | % | P. | Swing | Result |
|---|---|---|---|---|---|---|---|---|
| 2010 | Governor of Zambales | —N/a | LM | 125,202 | 55.62% | 1st | —N/a | Won |
| 2013 | Governor of Zambales | SZP | LM | 130,960 | 54.71% | 1st | -0.91 | Won |
| 2016 | Governor of Zambales | SZP | LM | 112,398 | 43.10% | 2nd | -11.61 | Lost |
| 2019 | Governor of Zambales | SZP | PDP–Laban | 151,667 | 54.10% | 1st | +11.00 | Won |
| 2022 | Governor of Zambales | SZP | PDP–Laban | 199,874 | 59.69% | 1st | +5.59 | Won |
| 2025 | Governor of Zambales | SZP | PFP | 306,367 | 90.85% | 1st | +31.16 | Won |

== Awards ==
- Distinguished Conduct Star
- Philippine Legion of Honor
- two Distinguished Service Stars
- PNP Distinguished Service Medal
- Medalya ng Katangi-tanging Gawa
- Bronze Cross Medal
- Military Merit Medals
- PMA Cavalier Award for Leadership and Command Administration
- Master Parachutist Badge

Political offices
| Preceded by Amor Deloso | Governor of Zambales | Incumbent |
| Preceded by Amor Deloso | Governor of Zambales | Succeeded by Amor Deloso |
Government offices
| Preceded by Norberto B. Gonzales | National Security Adviser | Succeeded by Norberto B. Gonzales |
| Preceded by Florante Soriquez (acting) | Secretary of Public Works and Highways | Succeeded by Manuel M. Bonoan (acting) |
| Preceded by Gloria Macapagal Arroyo | Secretary of National Defense | Succeeded by Norberto B. Gonzales (acting) |
| Preceded by Manuel M. Bonoan (acting) | Secretary of Public Works and Highways | Succeeded by Victor Domingo |
Police appointments
| Preceded by Leandro Mendoza | Philippine National Police Chief | Succeeded by Edgar Aglipay |
