= Amor Deloso =

Filipino lawyer and politician (1938–2026)

17th Governor of Zambales
- In office June 30, 2016 – June 30, 2019
- Vice Governor: Angel Magsaysay Cheng
- Preceded by: Hermogenes Ebdane
- Succeeded by: Hermogenes Ebdane
- In office June 30, 2007 – June 30, 2010
- Vice Governor: Anne Marie Gordon
- Preceded by: Vicente Magsaysay
- Succeeded by: Hermogenes Ebdane
- In office May 2, 1988 – March 4, 1998
- Vice Governor: Saturnino Bactad
- Preceded by: Luperio F. Villanueva
- Succeeded by: Saturnino Bactad
- In office April 14, 1986 – November 30, 1987
- Preceded by: Vicente Magsaysay
- Succeeded by: Luperio Villanueva

Personal details
- Born: Amor D. Deloso; September 3, 1938 Botolan, Zambales, Commonwealth of the Philippines
- Died: July 20, 2026 (aged 87)
- Party: NPC (2018–20??); MAKIMAZA (2018–20??)
- Other political affiliations: PGP (2016–2018); Liberal (1986–2016); PDP–Laban (1984–1986)
- Spouse: Sally Poynter (died 2020)
- Children: 9

Amor D. Deloso (September 3, 1938 – July 20, 2026) was a Filipino politician who served as the governor of Zambales, starting as the Officer-in-Charge from 1986 until 1987, Governor from 1988 until 1998, 2007 until 2010, and from 2016 until 2019.

== Career ==
Deloso was a member of the Liberal Party. He took part in the Partido Galing at Puso in 2016, and was a member of MAKIMAZA until his death in 2026.

On June 30, 2016, he issued Executive Order Number 1, ordering all mining companies to stop operation. This came after the Supreme Court of the Philippines issued Writ of Kalikasan against five large-scale mining companies.

== Personal life and death ==
Deloso was married to Sally Poynter with whom he had nine children. Poynter was also a politician having served as mayor of Botolan. He established a political family in Zambales with his daughter Cheryl Deloso-Montalla having been a House of Representatives member for Zambales's 2nd district and his other children including Ad Hebert and Izelle having run for various electoral posts within the province.

Deloso died on July 20, 2026, at the age of 87.

Political offices
| Preceded by Vicente Magsaysay | Governor of Zambales; 1986–1987 | Succeeded by Luperio Villanueva |
| Preceded by Luperio Villanueva | Governor of Zambales; 1988–1998 | Succeeded by Saturnino Bactad |
| Preceded by Vicente Magsaysay | Governor of Zambales; 2007–2010 | Succeeded by Hermogenes Ebdane |
| Preceded by Hermogenes Ebdane | Governor of Zambales; 2016–2019 | Succeeded by Hermogenes Ebdane |
