= Camilo Lammawin =

Filipino politician

Camilo T. Lammawin, Jr. is currently a provincial Board Member of the Municipality of Tabuk; Province of Kalinga in the Philippines.

In a July 30, 2019 report by Philippines Star, Rappler, Inquirer and Manila Bulletin, it stated that the Sandiganbayan has sentenced Camilo Lammawin Jr, former town mayor of Tabuk City, and his wife Salud Lammawin for to up to 34 years in prison.

In a decision released on July 29, 2019, the anti-graft court's seventh division said Camilo Lammawin Jr. and his wife Salud were found guilty of graft and direct bribery. They were also ordered to pay a fine of P1.5 million.

The couple asked P400,000 from Rodman Construction and Development Corp. (RCDC) in exchange for the release of a check amounting to P2 million representing the municipal government's payment for a project, the Office of the Ombudsman said in filing the charges in January 2014.

The ombudsman said the couple also asked P120,000 from RCDC in exchange for the release of another check amounting to P1.7 million.

Camilo joined the political bandwagon of the Philippines with an aim of improving qualities of life of fellow Tabukeños and Kalingas.

Camilo successfully served his initial three-year term as town mayor of the urban center and capital of the province introducing local innovations in the locality. A few of these projects include: the establishment of a town abattoir, farm-to-market and other infrastructure projects, the introduction of a one-town one-product promotion scheme, the improvement of local eco-tourism endeavors, and the establishment of a water system supportive of the 52 smaller local government units called barangays of the town.

Camilo vied for another term as mayor and won the local elections in May 2004. Pursuing his desire to upgrade the quality of life in the town, Camilo initiated moves to further unify tribes in the rural area through the Matagoan Peace Program.

He likewise pursued the proposal of converting the town into a city. The bill currently awaits approval at the upper house of congress. Shall the conversion be approved with finality, Tabuk, Kalinga will be the second city to be founded in the Cordillera Region. (Baguio came first on September 1, 1909).

Recognizing the importance of technology in local governance and global competitiveness, the mayor also introduced information technology innovations in the locality. These improvements include the upgrading of time-keeping systems in all departments of the local government and the establishment of an SMS-based emergency / alert system. Camilo also spearheaded the establishment of internet-based technology as an alternate mode of communication in the town which is one of the few rural areas where local landline telephony is still unavailable.
