= Atla =

Atla or ATLA may refer to:

== Organizations ==
- Acquisition, Technology & Logistics Agency, a Japanese Ministry of Defense agency for the Japan Self-Defense Forces
- American Association for Justice (previously the Association of Trial Lawyers of America), a nonprofit advocacy and lobbying organization for plaintiff's lawyers
- American Theological Library Association, a nonprofit, 501(c)(3), professional association, headquartered in Chicago, Illinois

== Places ==
- Atla (river), a river in Rapla County, Estonia
- Atla, Birbhum, a village in Rampurhat I CD Block in Rampurhat subdivision of Birbhum district, West Bengal, India
- Atla, Rapla County, a village in Juuru Parish, Rapla County, Estonia
- Atla, Saare County, a village in Saaremaa Parish, Saare County in western Estonia
- Atla Regio, a region on Venus

== Other ==
- Atla: A Story of the Lost Island, a fantasy novel by Ann Eliza Smith
- Atla (automobile), a French automobile that was manufactured from 1957 to 1959
- Atla (lichen), a genus of crustose lichens in the family Verrucariaceae
- ATLA: All This Life Allows, Vol. 1, the second studio album by American rapper Stat Quo
- Atla, one of the Nine Mothers of Heimdallr who gave birth to the god Heimdallr
- Avatar: The Last Airbender, American animated fantasy action television series
- ATLA journal - Alternatives to Laboratory Animals, published by SAGE, supported by FRAME

== See also ==
- Atala (disambiguation)
- Atlas (disambiguation)
- Attla (disambiguation)
