= Shrine and Pilgrim Center with a Tower of Light =

Religion
- Affiliation: Roman Catholic
- Province: Cebu

Location
- Location: Limasawa, Southern Leyte, Philippines
- Country: Philippines

Architecture
- Groundbreaking: February 2020
- Completed: March 2022 (projected)

The Shrine and Pilgrim Center with a Tower of Light is a 7-storey building under construction in Limasawa, Southern Leyte which is intended to be a Roman Catholic pilgrimage site.

== Construction ==
As part of the 500th anniversary of the introduction of Christianity in the Philippines, the Diocese of Maasin initiated a project to build a pilgrimage site in Magallanes village in the municipality island of Limasawa, with the town also recognized as the site of the first mass in the Philippines. The project was first announced as early as 2019. Funding for the project came from donations.

Groundbreaking for the project was held in February 2020 in a rite led by the diocese's Bishop Prescioso Cantillas and is scheduled to be finish prior to the end of the 2021 Quincentennial Commemorations in March 2022.

== Facilities ==
The Shrine and Pilgrim Center with a Tower of Light will serve as a monument dedicated to the First Mass in the Philippines. It will also serve as a museum, featuring exhibits related to the historic mass.
