= USS S-36 =

Submarine of the United States

Coordinates: 4°57′S 118°31′E

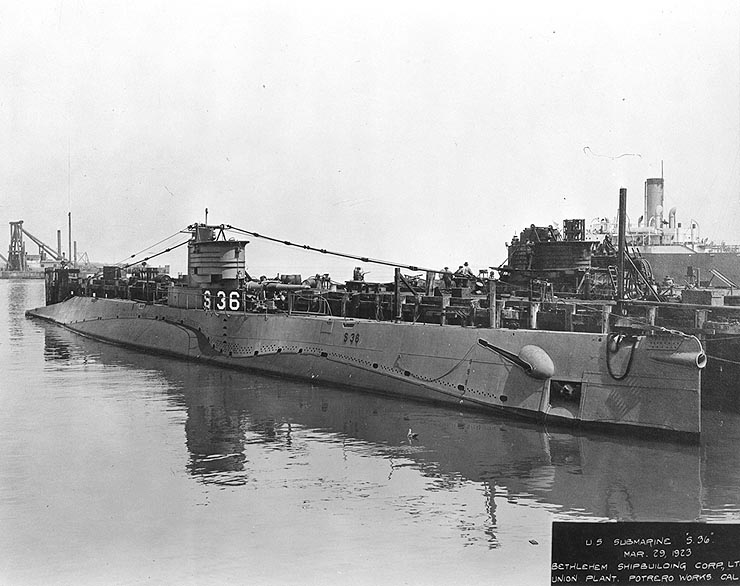
- USS S-36

History

United States
- Name: USS S-36
- Builder: Bethlehem Shipbuilding Corporation, San Francisco, California
- Laid down: 10 December 1918
- Launched: 3 June 1919
- Sponsored by: Miss Helen Russell
- Commissioned: 4 April 1923
- Fate: Ran aground 20 January 1942; Scuttled 21 January 1942

General characteristics
- Class & type: S-class submarine
- Displacement: 854 long tons (868 t) surfaced; 1,062 long tons (1,079 t) submerged
- Length: 219 ft 3 in (66.83 m)
- Beam: 20 ft 8 in (6.30 m)
- Draft: 15 ft 11 in (4.85 m)
- Speed: 14.5 knots (16.7 mph; 26.9 km/h) surfaced; 11 knots (13 mph; 20 km/h) submerged
- Complement: 42 officers and men
- Armament: 1 × 4 in (102 mm)/50 deck gun; 4 × 21 inch (533 mm) torpedo tubes

Service record
- Operations: World War II
- Awards: 1 battle star

USS S-36 (SS-141) was an S-class submarine of the United States Navy.

== Construction and commissioning ==
S-36's keel was laid down on 10 December 1918 by the Bethlehem Shipbuilding Corporation of San Francisco, California. She was launched on 3 June 1919 sponsored by Miss Helen Russell, and commissioned on 4 April 1923.

== Service history ==
Following trials, S-36 operated along the United States West Coast until the summer of 1925, with interruptions for exercises in Alaskan waters in June 1923 and for fleet maneuvers in the Caribbean Sea during the winter of 1924. She was then assigned to the United States Asiatic Fleet, departing the U.S. West Coast in mid-September 1925, and arriving at the Submarine Base, Cavite Navy Yard, Luzon, Philippines, on 4 November 1925.

=== Asiatic Fleet ===
For the next sixteen years, S-26 remained in the western Pacific, conducting exercises and patrols and undergoing overhauls at Cavite during the winter, and operating off the China coast from Tsingtao during the summer months. With the increase of hostilities on the mainland, however, summer deployments were shortened and individual patrols were extended throughout the Philippines, into the South China Sea, and in 1938, into the Dutch East Indies.

From April to June 1940, S-36 conducted her last China deployment and for the next year and a half remained in Philippine waters. By December 1941, the fleet was alerted to the possibility of a Japanese attack. On 2 December, her scheduled overhaul was cancelled and she was ordered north on patrol.

Water, stores, and torpedoes were taken on and she departed Cavite at 0100 on 3 December. By late afternoon, she was off Cape Bolinao, where she passed several Yangtze Patrol gunboats en route to Manila. At 1930, she entered Bolinao harbor, where she remained on continuous alert for the next week. On 8 December 1941, she received the news that the Japanese had started hostilities.

=== World War II ===
A few hours later, S-36 sighted enemy aircraft; that afternoon, she took up patrol duties between Cape Bolinao and San Fernando. On 9 December excessive air leaks developed, but she remained on patrol. On 10 December, the crew listened to radio traffic as the Japanese bombed Cavite. After the raid, the submarine's radio operator was unable to raise the station. On 12 December, S-36's electrical steering failed, and she was still unable to contact Cavite. Exhaust valve leaks appeared on 13 December, and on 14 December she received an urgent message requesting her position. None of her previous messages had gotten through. Two days later, she was ordered to Mariveles at the entrance to Manila Bay.

Still unable to transmit and with worsening air and salt water leaks, S-36 proceeded to Mariveles, anchoring there four days later. Repairs were made over the next few weeks and stores replenished, and she then started a final patrol in Philippine waters before heading south to join Allied forces gathering in the Dutch East Indies.

Clearing Mariveles Bay on 30 December 1941, she immediately commenced patrolling the Verde Island Passage between Luzon and Mindoro. On 1 January 1942, she reconnoitered the north and east coast of Batangas Bay, then moved to the west and south of Verde Island. In mid-afternoon, she sighted a small Japanese transport moored to the seawall at Calapan, Mindoro, fired one torpedo, and claimed the sinking of the target. However, this was not confirmed by Japanese loss records.

For seven more days, she maintained her patrol in the Passage. On 8 January, the port engine air compressor failed, and, because of battery water consumption and the distance and time involved in the transit to the Dutch East Indies, she began making her way south. On 10 January, the starboard engine air compressor became troublesome. On 12 January, she hunted in the Sulu Sea. On 13 January, her port main motor went out of commission, but on 14 January she resumed hunting in the Sulu Sea.

On the morning of 15 January, at the approximate intersection of the Sibutu-Makassar and Davao-Tarakan routes, diving was delayed by oil supply failures to the starboard engine, and she was spotted by a Japanese destroyer.

With one engine out, S-36 submerged and prepared to fire torpedoes at the Japanese warship. But the destroyer was quicker, and before the submarine could fire, the enemy dropped seven depth charges which exploded off both quarters of the S-boat.

Immediate damage included the loss of power control over the bow planes; gyrocompass failure; blown fuses on the starboard lighting circuit, and broken lights in the motor room. By the time she reached a depth of 150 feet (46 m), her gyrocompass was working again and she began turning slowly to starboard. The destroyer was kept astern.

S-36 ran at one-third speed, but with poor depth control and trim. Soon her main motor bearing began smoking, and oil had to be continuously applied by hand with an squirt gun. At about 0630, almost an hour and a half after the initial contact, she lost depth control and her trim pump stalled. The No. 2 main ballast was blown and at 230 feet (70 m) the boat began to rise to the surface. Previous steps were reversed, and venting and flooding was started by the crew. The boat stopped at a depth of 90 feet (27 m).

As the destroyer continued to hunt her, S-36's depth continued to fluctuate between 100–200 feet (30–60 m). Life jackets and escape lungs were issued. At 0700, control was reestablished, and at 0705 the crew heard the last efforts of the destroyer to locate her. Still in critical condition of trim and propulsion, S-36 cleared the area and about noontime began making repairs to her port main motor. By 2030, the motor was operating "after a fashion." Within six hours, however, it was smoking. The battery charge was secured. At 0320 on 16 January, the starboard motor lubrication supply again failed.

At dawn on 16 January, S-36 submerged. Two hours later, she sighted the Sulawesi (Celebes) coast. At noon, fire broke out in the main motor auxiliary circulating pump and was extinguished. After 1900, she surfaced, and at 2308 passed North Watcher Island at the northern end of Makassar Strait.

On 17 January, she received orders to proceed to Surabaya, Java. Both port and starboard shafts went out of commission during the day and one man collapsed from the heat, but the main motor lube oil pumps were repaired. On 18 January, S-36 had her "1st day since January 8 with no major part of engineering plant out of commission." She continued south through Makassar Strait.

=== Loss ===
At 0404 on 20 January 1942, S-36 ran hard aground on Taka Bakang Reef at the southern end of Makassar Strait, approximately 60 nautical miles (110 km; 69 mi) west-northwest of Makassar, Celebes, Netherlands East Indies. For over twenty-four hours the crew battled to save the submarine, but chlorine gas generated by her flooded forward battery and the sea conditions combined against them. A plain-language radio request for aid was sent, and on the morning of 21 January, the Dutch launch Attla was dispatched from Makassar. Two officers and 28 men transferred to Attla and taken to Makassar, but S-36's commanding officer (Lt. John R. McKnight Jr.) and the remaining crew stayed on board for a final attempt to save S-36. However, the situation worsened, and when the Dutch cargo ship Siberote arrived after noon, McKnight decided the submarine was beyond saving, transferred himself and the remaining crew to the Dutch vessel, and scuttled S-36 by flooding at 1330.

Siberote proceeded to Makassar to pick up the previously evacuated crew members, then to Surabaya, where they were reassigned.

== Awards ==
- Yangtze Service Medal
- China Service Medal
- American Defense Service Medal
- Asiatic-Pacific Campaign Medal with one battle star
- World War II Victory Medal
- Philippine Presidential Unit Citation
- Philippine Defense Medal with star
