= Darvand =

In Zoroastrianism, darvand, in its original Avestan form dregvant means 'wicked'. It is an ethical appellation of unrighteous persons. Angra Mainyu, the Evil Spirit, is a dregvant or darvand or wicked, as Spenta Mainyu, the Good Spirit, is ashavan or righteous.

"Thou Ahura Mazda, most recognize only two classes among mankind, the 'ashavan' or righteous and the 'dregvant,' 'darvand' or wicked to whatever religion they may belong. Those alone among Zoroastrians, who think good thoughts, speak good words and do good deeds are 'ashavan' or righteous in thy sight. Those who don Sudrah and Kusti, the sacred shirt and girdle, and call themselves the Mazda worshipping Zoroastrians yet think evil thoughts and speak evil words and do evil deeds, are 'darvands' or wicked. Those that profess to be good Mazdayasnians, but whose conduct gives the lie to their profession, are themselves 'darvands,' wicked indeed."

— http://www.avesta.org/dhalla/history2.htm

== In literature ==
In Anne Eliza Smith's novel "Seola" published in 1878, a darvand is a child of an angel and a human, usually a male angel and a woman. Devas (or angels) and darvands are defined early on in the novel on page 15 and again later on page 64.
