= Santiago Island (Pangasinan) =

Island in the Philippines

- Location within Philippines

Geography
- Coordinates: 16°23′53″N 119°56′12″E
- Adjacent to: Lingayen Gulf; South China Sea

Administration
- Philippines
- Region: Ilocos Region
- Province: Pangasinan
- Municipality: Bolinao

Santiago Island is an island located off the northeast coast of Bolinao, Pangasinan, Philippines. It is composed of six barangays namely Binabalian, Goyoden, Lucero, Pilar, Salud, and Victory, all within the municipality of Bolinao. Located in this island is the Giant Clam Ocean Nursery and Marine Protected Areas (MPAs). It is ideal for various aquatic activities like scuba-diving, snorkeling, and boating.

== Santiago Island bridge ==
In September 2024, Senator Imee Marcos led the ground breaking of Santiago Island bridge with Congressman Arthur Celeste, DPWH Director Ronnel Tan and Bolinao Vice Mayor Richard Celeste. The PHP1.95 billion 680 linear meter bridge will connect Santiago Island's 7 barangays to Bolinao town proper, starting from Barangay Salud to Barangay Luciente 2nd, Bolinao. The 3.3 kilometers entire bridge incorporates a 2.62-kilometer road with shoulder lanes, slope protection, road safety facilities and bike lanes. The bridge results in greater accessibility to the Marine Science Institute's giant clams sea nursery near Silaki Island via one-hour boat ride from the Picocobuan Fish Port. Currently, it takes 20 minutes travel time from Barangay Binabalian to Picucubuan Port, Luciente 1st, Bolinao through a landing barge. Department of Public Works and Highways Ilocos Region Director Engineer Ronnel Tan said the bridge is expected to be completed in 2027.

== Fourteen Mile Reef ==
The Fourteen Mile Reef off the coast of Santiago Island is several kilometers long and is actually an extension of the western edge of Lingayen Gulf. It has some hard and soft coral growth, many shells and variety of fish. Its gradual slope ranges from 10 metres (33 ft) to 40 metres (130 ft) with the western edge dropping abruptly to over 250 metres (820 ft).

== See also ==
- List of islands of the Philippines
