= Attala =

Attala may refer to:

- Saint Attala (6th century CE - 627)
- Attala County, Mississippi, USA
- USS Attala (APA-130), ship
- Attala, Hungary, village

== See also ==
- Atala (disambiguation)
- Atalla (disambiguation)
- Attalla, Alabama, USA
- Attla (disambiguation)
