= Atala =

Atala may refer to:

- 152 Atala, an asteroid
- Atala (company), an Italian manufacturer of bicycles
  - Atala (cycling team), sponsored by the bicycle manufacturer
- Atala (district), a district in Tampere, Finland
- Atala (novella), a novella by François-René de Chateaubriand
- Atala, Dominican Republic
- Eumaeus atala, a species of butterfly
- Atala, fictional training master in The Hunger Games trilogy by Suzanne Collins
- Saint Attala, also known as Abbot Atala, medieval monk of Bobbio (died 622)
- Atala, pen name of poet Léonise Valois (1868–1936)
- Atala Apodaca Anaya, a Mexican teacher, feminist and revolutionary
- Atala (mythical planet), in Hinduism

== See also ==
- Attala (disambiguation)
- Atalla (disambiguation)
- Atallah (disambiguation)
- Atila (disambiguation)
- Atula, a Sanskrit-language poet
