= Atalla =

Atalla may refer to:

- Mohamed M. Atalla, Egyptian-American semiconductor and cybersecurity pioneer, also known by the alias "John" or "Martin" M. Atalla
- Utimaco Atalla, Information Protection and Control Suite (data security software) company, founded by Mohamed Atalla
- Ash Atalla, a British television producer
- Andrew Atalla, the British founder of online marketing agency atom42
- The former name of Epworth, Georgia

== See also ==
- Attala (disambiguation)
