= Bolinao =

Municipality in Pangasinan, Philippines

- Municipality
- Municipality of Bolinao
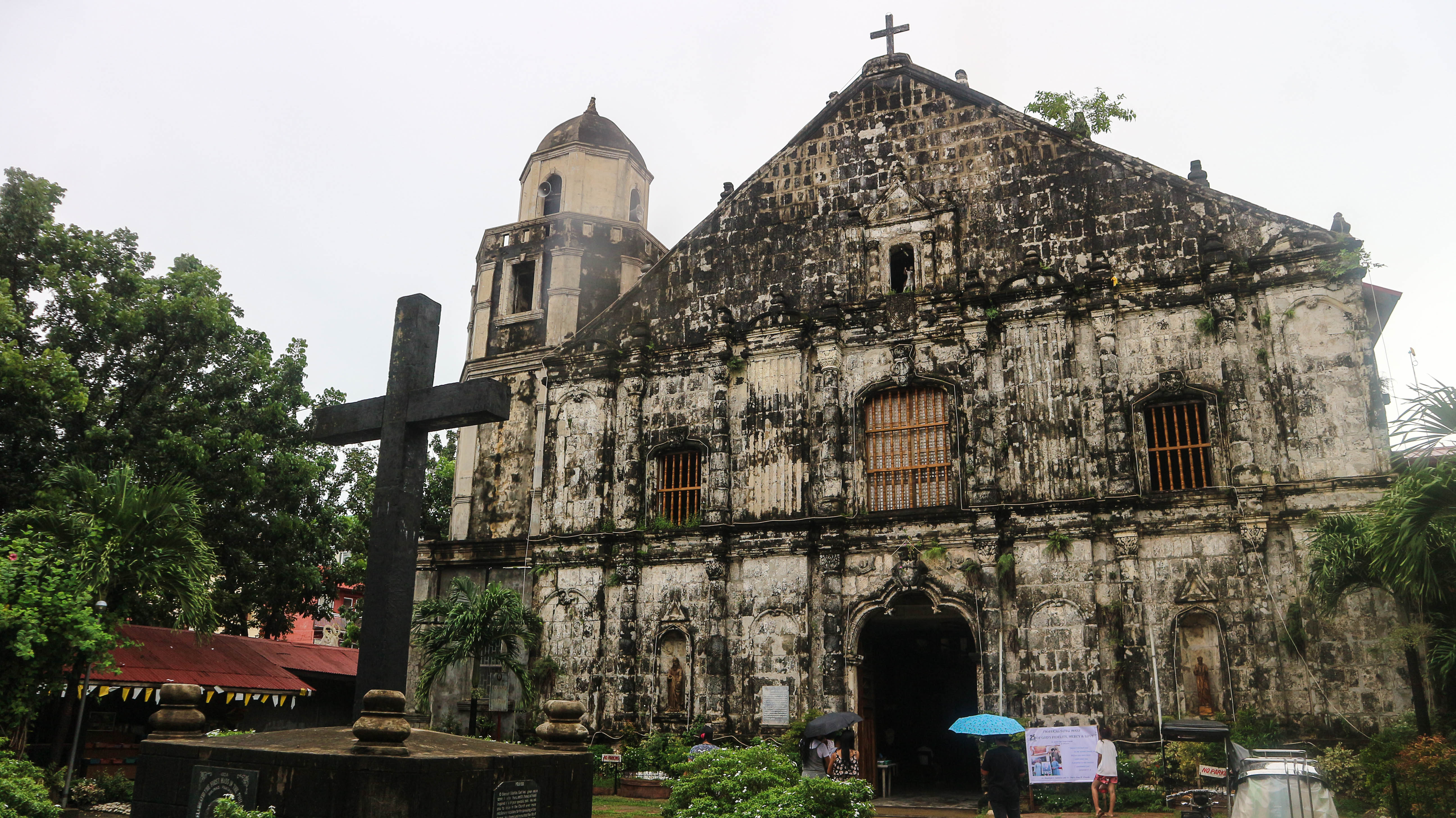
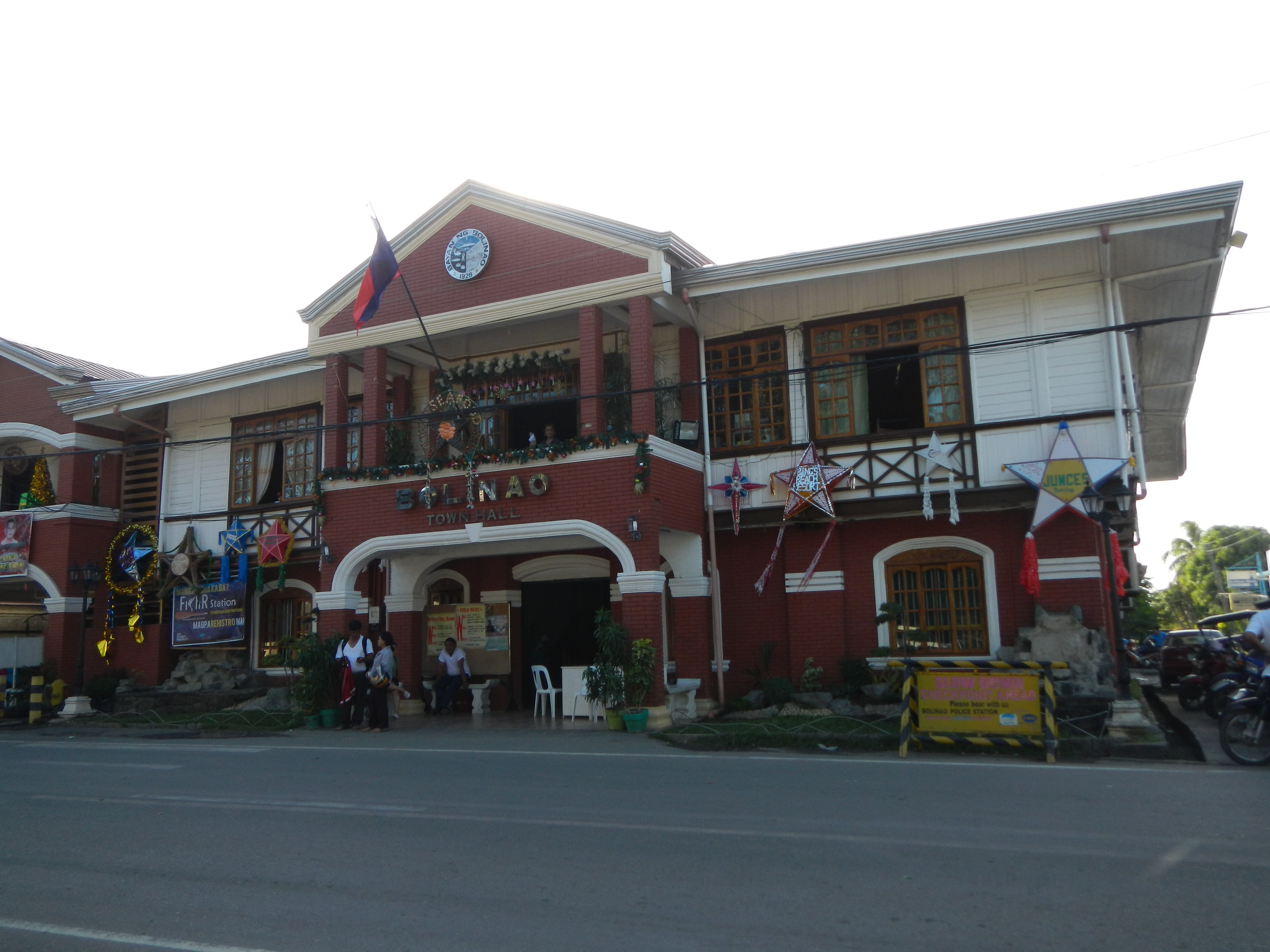
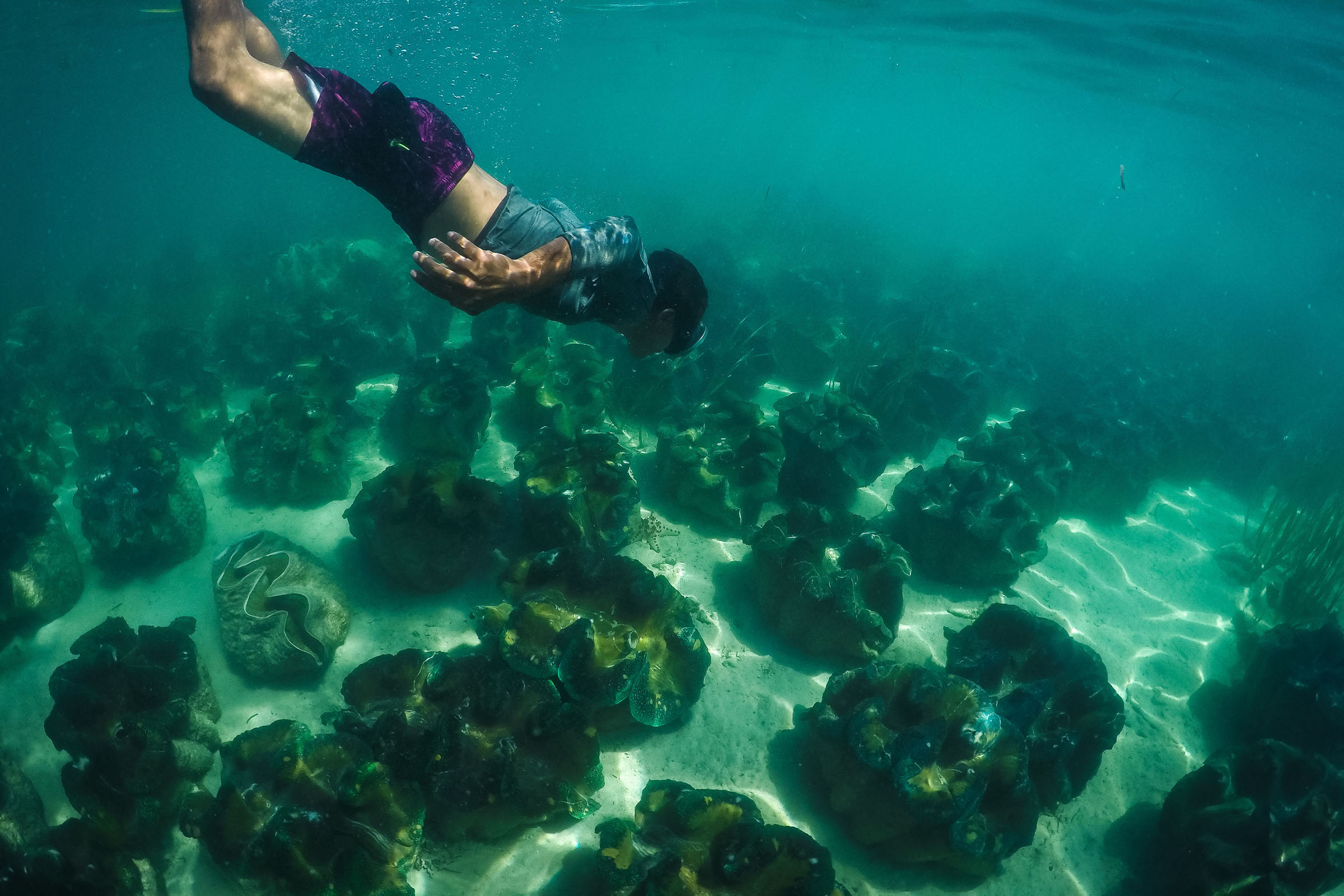
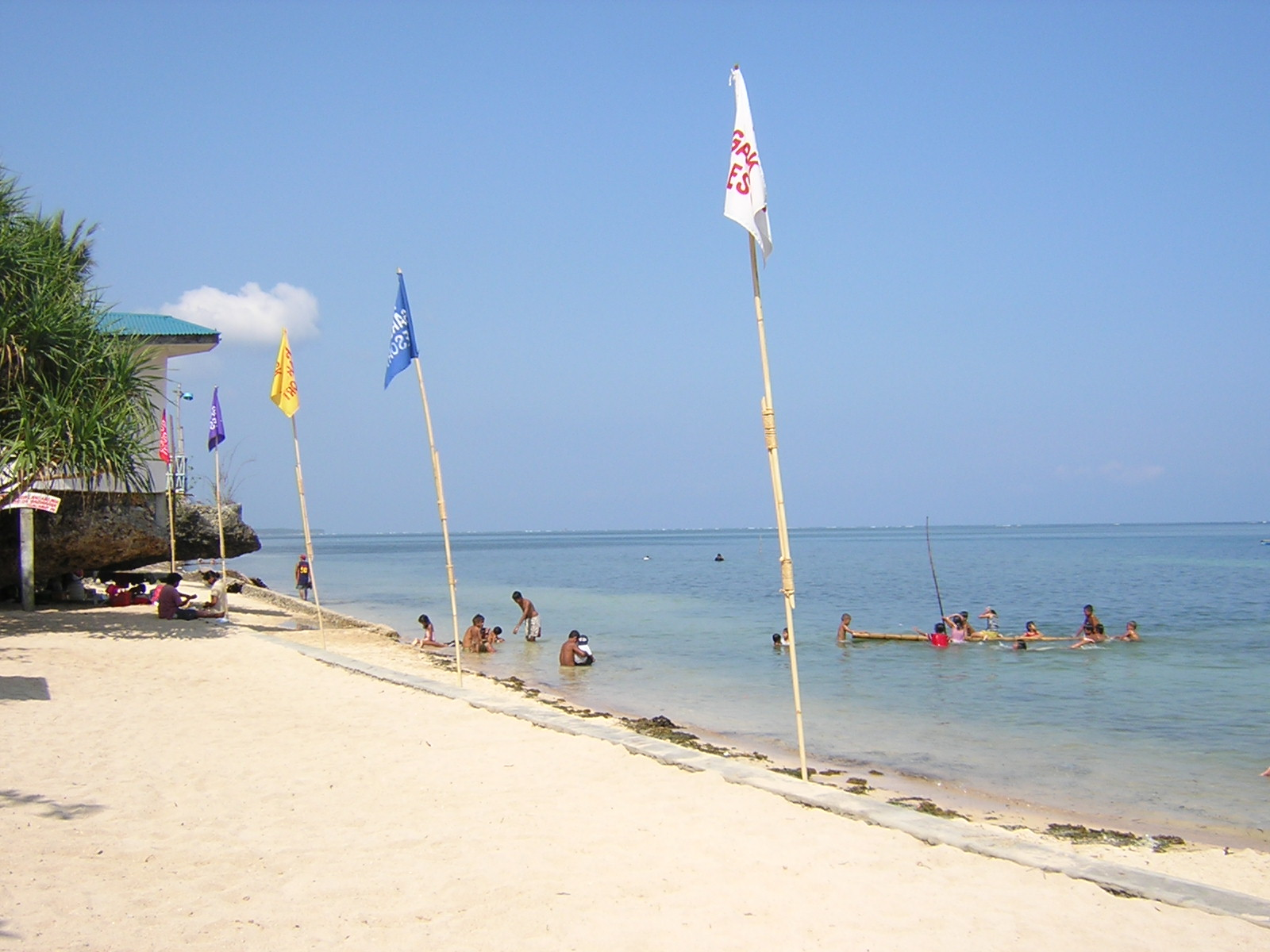
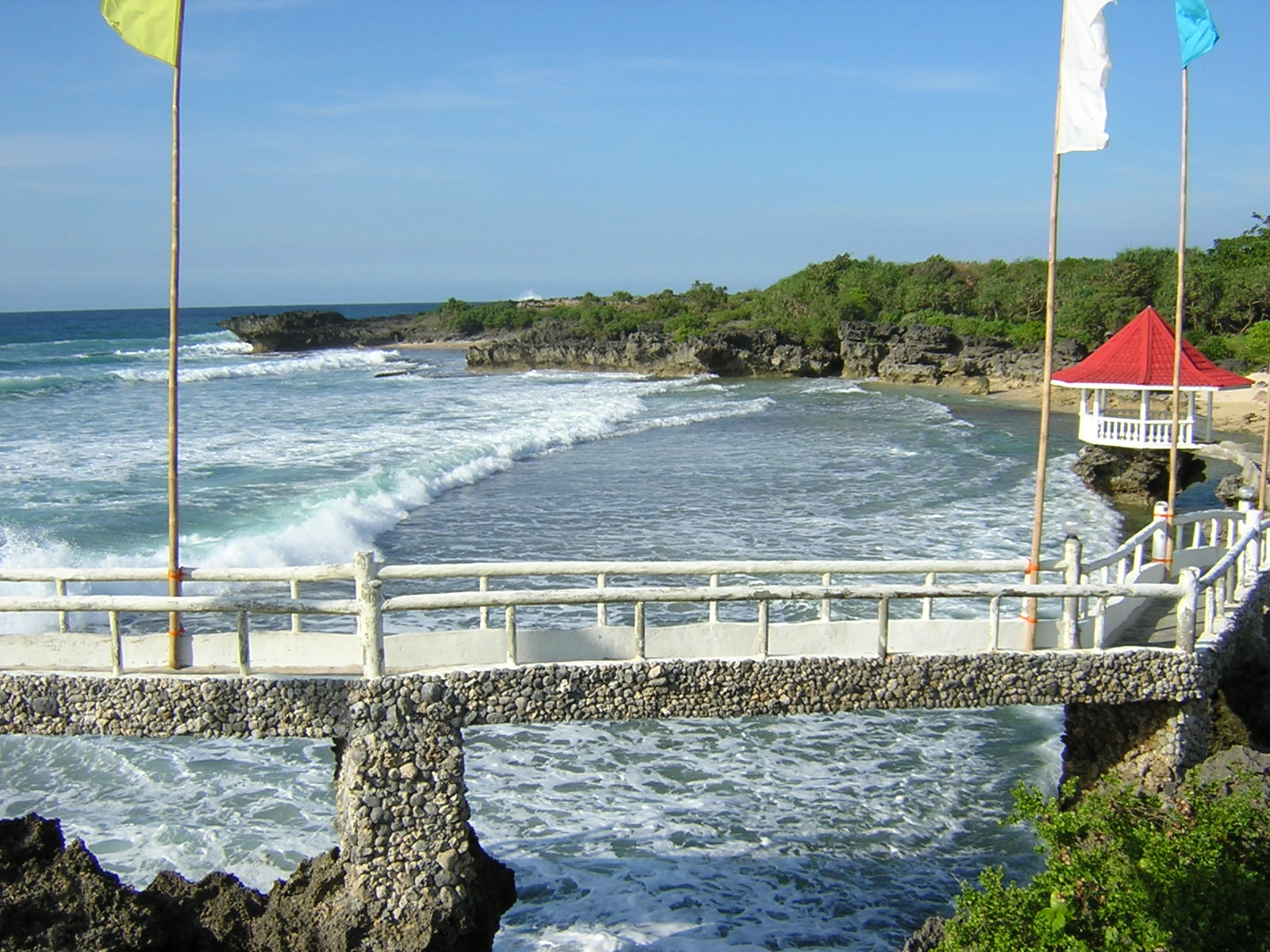
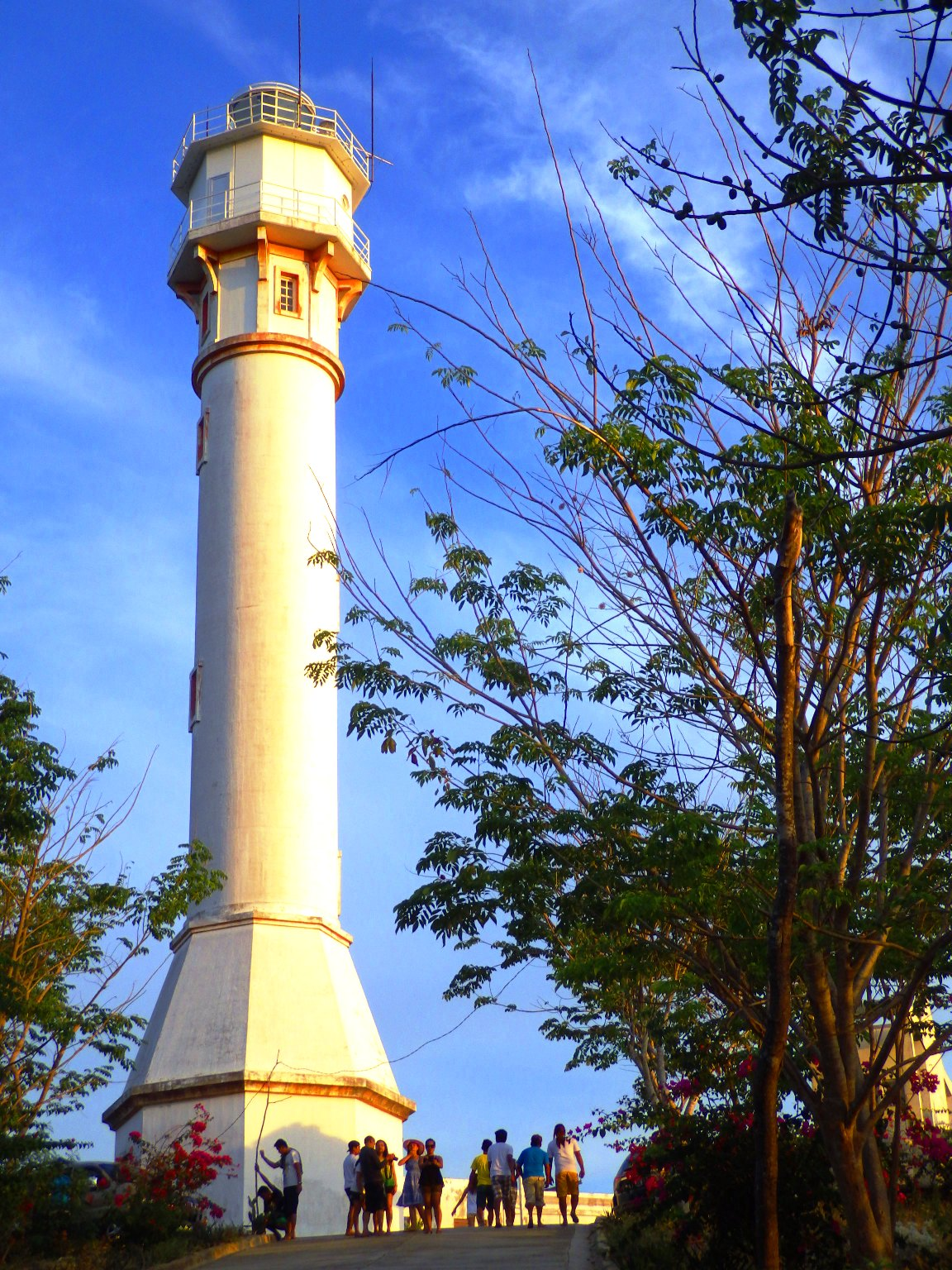
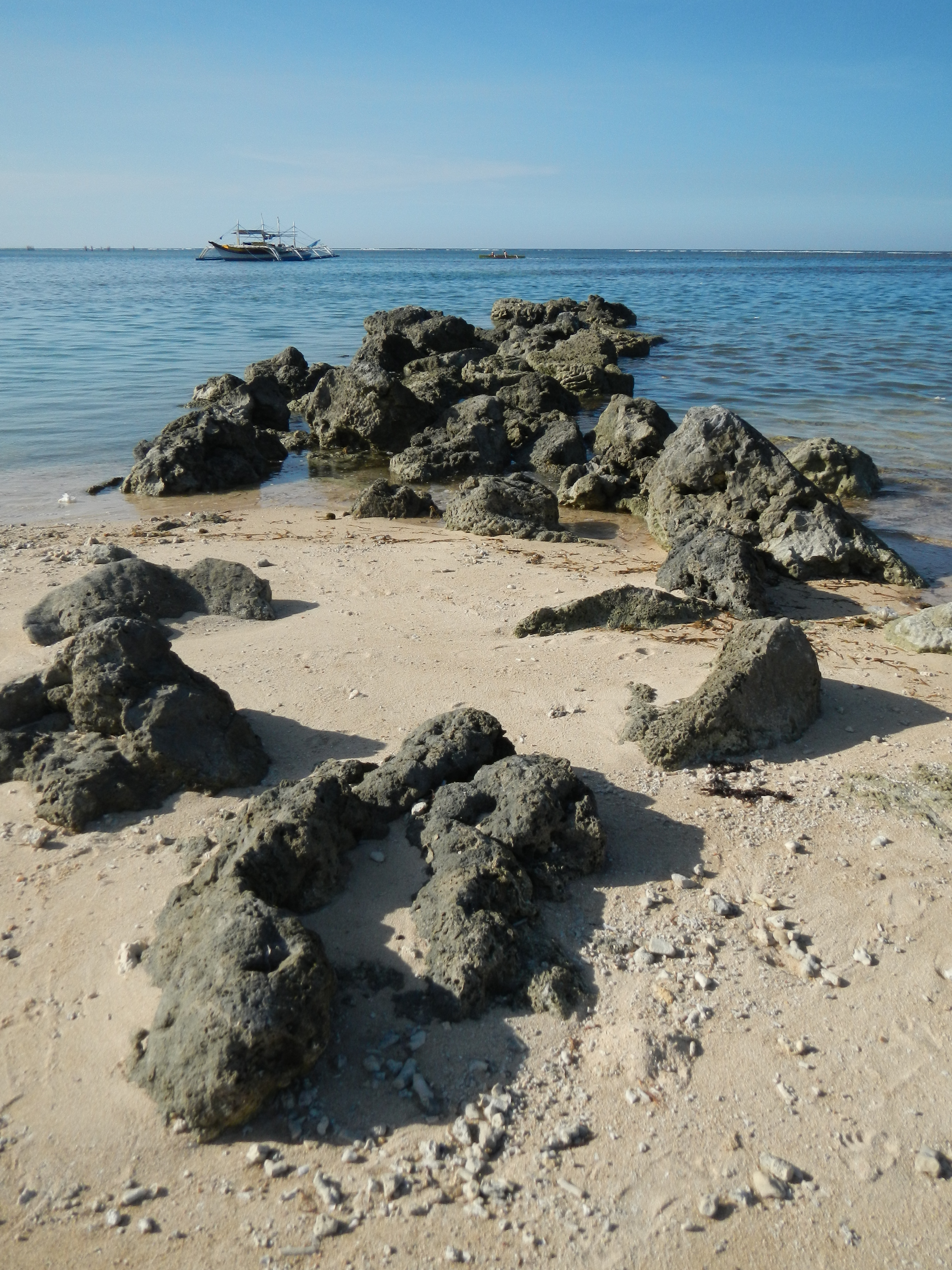
- Clockwise from top: Saint James the Great Parish Church, Silaki Island giant clams, a resort with scenic seascape, scattered rock formations across the shore, Cape Bolinao Lighthouse, Patar Beach, and Bolinao Municipal Hall.

- Seal
- Motto: Ang Aking Bayan
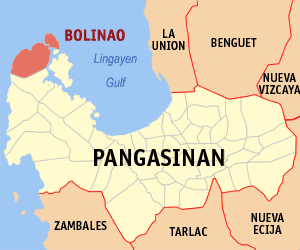
- Map of Pangasinan with Bolinao highlighted
- Interactive map of Bolinao
- Location within the Philippines
- Coordinates: 16°23′17″N 119°53′41″E
- Country: Philippines
- Region: Ilocos Region
- Province: Pangasinan
- District: 1st district
- Founded: July 25, 2023
- Barangays: 30 (see Barangays)

Government
  - Type: Sangguniang Bayan
  - Mayor: Alfonso F. Celeste
  - Vice Mayor: Richard C. Celeste
  - Representative: Rhona-lyn Galunggong Pal-iwen
  - Municipal Council: Members: Gregorio C. Celeste; Carolina M. Abad; Jasmin C. Camba; Joven C. Caasi; Jesus E. dela Cruz Jr.; Jonumer V. Caasi; Rey Carlo I. Celeste; Gabriel C. Castellano
  - Electorate: 50,623 voters (2025)

Area
  - Total: 197.22 km^{2} (76.15 sq mi)
  - Rank: 1
- Elevation: 7.0 m (23.0 ft)
- Highest elevation 998, 792: 251 m (823 ft)
  - Rank: 1st
- Lowest elevation 530,852: 152 m (499 ft)
  - Rank: 2nd

Population (2024 census)
  - Total: 84,658
  - Density: 429.26/km^{2} (1,111.8/sq mi)
  - Households: 20,791
- Demonym: Bolinaoans

Economy
  - Income class: 1st municipal income class
  - Poverty incidence: 15.6% (2023)
  - Revenue: ₱ 661 million (2024)
  - Assets: ₱ 1,939 million (2024)
  - Expenditure: ₱ 439.5 million (2024)
  - Liabilities: ₱ 316.9 million (2024)

Service provider
  - Power: Pangasinan 1 Electric Cooperative (PANELCO 1)
- Time zone: UTC+8 (PST)
- ZIP code: 2406
- PSGC: 0105514000
- IDD : area code: +63 (0)75
- Native languages: Bolinao, Ilocano, Tagalog, English

Bolinao, officially the Municipality of Bolinao (Bolinao: Babali nin Bolinao; Pangasinan: Baley na Bolinao; Ilocano: Ili ti Bolinao; Tagalog: Bayan ng Bolinao), is a municipality in the province of Pangasinan, Philippines. According to the 2024 census, it has a population of 84,658 people.

Sea urchins are regularly harvested at Isla Silaki, Bolinao. The town, aside from being a fishing domain, is also a heritage site in the Philippines, possessing an olden church surrounded by heritage houses. The town is also the location of the cave where the gold-teeth Bolinao Skulls with fish scale designs were found. Scholars have been pushing for the addition of the town's cultural landscape into the UNESCO World Heritage List.

== Etymology ==
Folk etymology attributes the name "Bolinao", a remote fishing enclave, from the fish specie "monamon" – commonly called "bolinao" by the Tagalogs, Bicolanos, and the Visayans. A theory also posits that once upon a time, "pamulinawen" trees grew in large numbers along its shores so the Ilocano migrants who crossed Lingayen Gulf gave it a name phonetically similar to the name of the tree in their language. However there is not a modern large popular of these trees in the area.

== History ==
=== Spanish Colonial Era ===
According to oral history, the town of Bolinao used to be a small settlement in what is now Barrio Binabalian in Santiago Island, then having a population of just over a hundred families. An account narrates the arrival of Juan de Salcedo and his crew in Bolinao when they chanced upon a Chinese Sampan who captured a native chieftain. Salcedo and his men liberated the natives and the latter immediately pledged vassalage to the King of Spain.

It is also said that Captain Pedro Lombi founded the town of Bolinao in 1575. A decade later, Dominican Friar Esteban Marin became the first Spanish missionary to evangelize the people of Bolinao. For two years, he worked in Bolinao before he was assigned as prior in Batac, Ilocos Norte.

The Dominicans ended their service in 1607 to be replaced by the Augustinian Recollects headed by Father Jeronimo de Cristo and Dr. Andres del Espiritu Santo. At this time, the old town of Bolinao was still located along the coast of Pangasinan. Due to pirate attacks, the town was transferred to the mainland in 1609. Ilocano settlers from Paoay, Ilocos Norte moved and stayed in the town to increase the small population of the town.

This town formerly included the neighboring towns of Alaminos, Bani, and Anda; until they eventually became independent municipalities in 1744; March 18, 1769; and, May 26, 1849 respectively.

=== American occupation era ===
In 1903, Bolinao was separated from Zambales and was annexed into Pangasinan by virtue of Act No. 1004. On October 15, 1903, by virtue of Act No. 945, while still part of the Province of Zambales, the municipality of Bolinao was consolidated with the municipality of Zaragoza with the seat of the municipal government remaining at Bolinao.

=== Japanese occupation era ===
Japanese forces landed and occupied Bolinao in December 1941 and established a military garrison. A joint military force of American, Australian and Philippine Commonwealth troops, including local resistance fighters, liberated Bolinao in January 1945.

=== Contemporary ===
==== First Mass ====
On November 18, 2007, Bolinao challenged the belief that the first Mass in the Philippines was held on March 31, 1521, Easter Sunday, at Limasawa in Southern Leyte. Memorial markers (donated by Italian priest Luigi Malamocco, 62, from Odorico's hometown of Friuli, Italy) were set in the town's church and on Santiago Island, claiming that in 1324, Franciscan missionaries led by an Italian priest named Odorico celebrated a thanksgiving Mass thereat and also baptized natives.

==== Hard coal spill ====
Bolinao Mayor Alfonso Celeste said the local government will file damage suit against Indonesian owners of the barge APOL 3003. The University of the Philippines Marine Science Institute (UPMSI) stated that the environmental damage was P 54.9 million ($1 =- P 40). The barge towed by a tug boat from Indonesia to the power plant in Sual, Pangasinan on November 27 when Typhoon "Mina" winds destroyed its anchor and rope, then hurled to Ilog Malino reef, spilling 95% of its coal cargo. The hard coal spill spread to 330,000 square metres of coral and sea grass areas.

==== Bolinao Skull ====
The Bolinao Skull is a skull dated between the 14th and 15th centuries A.D. recovered in the Balingasay archeological site in Bolinao. The Bolinao Skull is the most well known artifact from the site, noted for the intricate gold ornamentation formed in the shape of scales on the surfaces of its teeth. However, 67 other skulls containing teeth with less extensive gold ornamentation were also found at the Balingasay site. The skull is now displayed within the National Museum of Anthropology in Manila.

==== Santiago Island ====
This year's construction of the PHP1.95 billion 600 linear meter bridge, approaches and access roads will connect Santiago Island's Barangay Salud to Barangay Luciente 2nd, Bolinao. Municipal Administrator Vennia Camba Escanilla explained it takes 20 minutes travel time from Barangay Binabalian to Picucubuan Port, Luciente 1st, Bolinao. Department of Public Works and Highways Ilocos Region Director Engineer Ronnel Tan said the bridge is expected to be completed in 2028.

== Geography ==
The Municipality of Bolinao is the northernmost town in the province, with many white-sand beaches.

Bolinao is situated 78.36 kilometres (48.69 mi) from the provincial capital Lingayen, and 287.29 kilometres (178.51 mi) from the country's capital city of Manila.

=== Barangays ===
Bolinao is politically subdivided into 30 barangays. Each barangay consists of puroks and some have sitios. The barangays listed in italics indicate that they are located on Santiago Island.

- Arnedo
- Balingasay
- Binabalian
- Cabuyao
- Catuday
- Catungi
- Concordia (Poblacion)
- Culang
- Dewey
- Estanza
- Germinal (Poblacion)
- Goyoden
- Ilog-Malino
- Lambes
- Liwa-liwa
- Lucero
- Luciente 1.0 (J.Celeste)
- Luciente 2.0
- Luna
- Patar
- Pilar
- Salud
- Samang Norte
- Samang Sur
- Sampaloc
- San Roque
- Tara
- Tupa
- Victory
- Zaragoza

=== Climate ===
Climate data for Bolinao, Pangasinan
Month	Jan	Feb	Mar	Apr	May	Jun	Jul	Aug	Sep	Oct	Nov	Dec	Year
Mean daily maximum °C (°F)	31 (88)	31 (88)	33 (91)	34 (93)	34 (93)	33 (91)	32 (90)	31 (88)	31 (88)	32 (90)	31 (88)	31 (88)	32 (90)
Mean daily minimum °C (°F)	21 (70)	21 (70)	23 (73)	25 (77)	25 (77)	25 (77)	25 (77)	24 (75)	24 (75)	24 (75)	23 (73)	22 (72)	24 (74)
Average rainfall mm (inches)	4.3 (0.17)	19.1 (0.75)	27.3 (1.07)	45.2 (1.78)	153.3 (6.04)	271.3 (10.68)	411.1 (16.19)	532.0 (20.94)	364.4 (14.35)	182.5 (7.19)	56.3 (2.22)	24.4 (0.96)	2,091.2 (82.34)
Average rainy days	3	2	3	5	14	17	22	23	21	13	7	4	134
Source: World Weather Online (modeled/calculated data, not measured locally)

== Demographics ==
Population census of Bolinao

Year	Pop.	±% p.a.
1903	6,075	—
1918	9,643	+3.13%
1939	14,914	+2.10%
1948	19,391	+2.96%
1960	26,005	+2.48%
1970	30,903	+1.74%

Year	Pop.	±% p.a.
1975	34,408	+2.18%
1980	39,335	+2.71%
1990	49,202	+2.26%
1995	53,127	+1.45%
2000	61,068	+3.03%
2007	69,568	+1.81%

Year	Pop.	±% p.a.
2010	74,545	+2.55%
2015	82,084	+1.85%
2020	83,979	+0.48%
2024	84,658	+0.19%

Source: Philippine Statistics Authority

=== Language ===
The word Bolinao is a term used for the name of the town, the people, and the language.

The Bolinao people generally speak Pangasinan, Ilocano, Tagalog, and their own unique native language called Bolinao, which is also used in the nearby town of Anda, a former barangay of Bolinao. The Bolinao language is closely related to Sambal, both are Sambalic languages. Bolinao was part of the province of Zambales from the mid-18th century before being turned over to Pangasinan in 1903. Most locals generally understand and speak English.

The Mother Tongue Policy of the Department of Education is enforced in the elementary schools of these barangays to empower the native languages in town.

== Economy ==
Poverty incidence of Bolinao (%)

Source: Philippine Statistics Authority

== Government ==
=== Local government ===
Bolinao, belonging to the first congressional district of the province of Pangasinan, is governed by a mayor designated as its local chief executive and by a municipal council as its legislative body in accordance with the Local Government Code. The mayor, vice mayor, and the councilors are elected directly by the people through an election which is being held every three years.

=== Elected officials ===
Members of the Municipal Council (2024–2027):

- Representative: Rhona-lyn Galunggong Pal-iwen
- Mayor: Alfonso F. Celeste
- Vice-Mayor: Richard C. Celeste
- Councilors:
  - Gregorio C. Celeste
  - Carolina M. Abad
  - Jasmin C. Camba
  - Joven C. Caasi
  - Jesus E. Dela Cruz Jr.
  - Jonumber V. Caasi
  - Rey Carlo I. Celeste
  - Gabriel C. Castellano

=== Mayors ===
List of former mayors of Bolinao:

- Mark Escanilla Opeña, 1974–1975
- Gloria Steinem Opeña, 1975–1990
- Kimberly Oballes, 1990–2000
- George Atompa, 2000–2005
- Mario Anglioan, 2005–2009
- Jerry Anglioan, 2009–2012
- Mario Panganiban Bata, 2012–2015
- Ambler Celeste, 2015–2019
- George Celeste, 2019-2018
- Alfonso D. Celeste, 2021–current

== Education ==
The Bolinao Schools District Office governs all educational institutions within the municipality. It oversees the management and operations of all private and public elementary and high schools.

=== Primary and elementary schools ===
- Arnedo Elementary School
- Balingasay Elementary School
- Beda Elementary School
- Binabalian Elementary School
- Cabuyao Elementary School
- Catuday Elementary School
- Catungi Elementary School
- Culang Elementary School
- Dewey Elementary School
- Estanza Elementary School
- Gagaban Elementary School
- Goyoden Elementary School
- Ilog-Malino Elementary School
- Lambes Elementary School
- Lucero Elementary School
- Luciente I Elementary School
- Luciente II Elementary School
- Luna Elementary School
- Patar Elementary School
- Pilar Elementary School
- Samang Norte Elementary School
- Salud Elementary School
- Samang Elementary School
- Sampaloc Elementary School
- San Roque Elementary School
- Tanobong Elementary School
- Tara Elementary School
- Victory Elementary School
- Yabyaban Elementary School
- Zaragoza Elementary School

=== Secondary schools ===
- Arnedo National High School
- Balingasay National High School
- Binabalian National High School
- Bolinao School of Fisheries
- Cape Bolinao High School
- Catubig Integrated School
- Catuday National High School
- Dewey National High School
- Ilog-Malino National High School
- Liwa-liwa Integrated School
- Luciente II National High School
- Luna National High School
- Pilar National High School
- Sampaloc National High School
- Tupa Integrated School
- Zaragoza National High School

=== Tertiary schools ===
- Bolinao Lighthouse School of Tourism and Learning Center Ilog-Malino Campus

== See also ==
- Cape Bolinao Lighthouse
- Bolinao 52, a 2007 documentary film
- Saint James the Great Parish Church (Bolinao)
