= Saint James the Great Parish Church =

Roman Catholic church in Pangasinan, Philippines

Bolinao Church
- Saint James the Great Parish Church
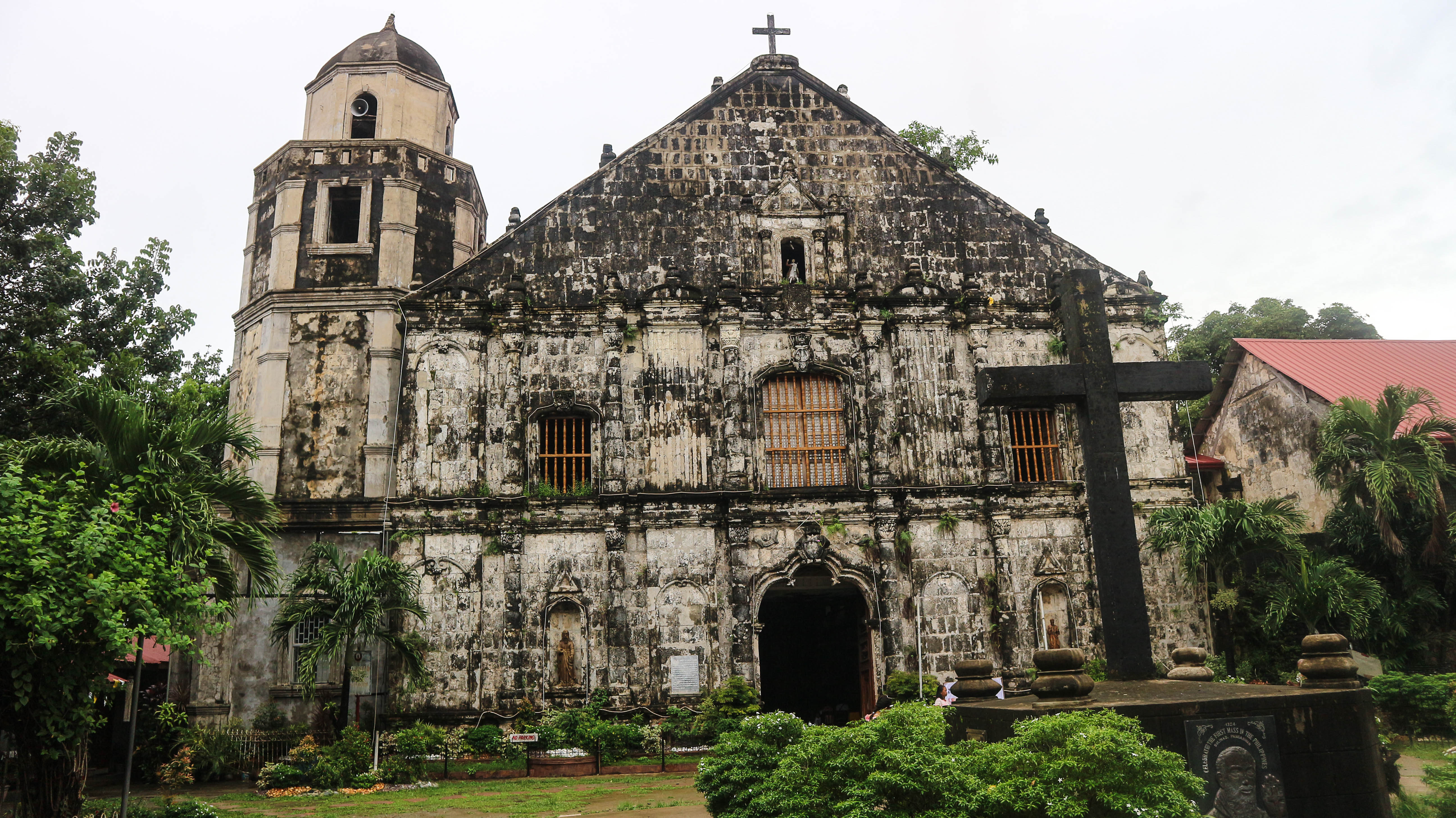
- Church façade in 2019

- Location in Luzon Location in the Philippines
- 16°23′18″N 119°53′37″E
- Location: Bolinao, Pangasinan
- Country: Philippines
- Denomination: Roman Catholic

History
- Status: Parish church
- Dedication: Saint James the Great

Architecture
- Functional status: Active
- Architectural type: Church building
- Style: High Renaissance

Administration
- Archdiocese: Lingayen-Dagupan
- Diocese: Alaminos

Clergy
- Archbishop: Socrates B. Villegas
- Bishop: Napoleon Sipalay

Saint James the Great Parish Church, commonly known as Bolinao Church, is a Spanish colonial Roman Catholic church located at Brgy. Germinal in Bolinao, Pangasinan, Philippines. It is under the jurisdiction of the Diocese of Alaminos. The church was made out of black coral stones. The church underwent series of natural and man-made calamities, such as the 1788 earthquake, 1819 fire incident, and Typhoon Emong in 2009.

== History ==
The first religious friars in Bolinao were the Augustinians who stayed in the town from 1585 to 1587. The Dominicans took charge from 1588 to 1599. In 1600, the Augustinians returned and stayed until 1607. The missionary work left by the Augustinians were taken over by the Augustinian Recollects who administered the town from 1609 to 1679, up to 1712 when the Dominicans took over again. When the Recollects returned in 1609, they transferred the town to the mainland because of the troubles inflicted by the piratical raids. The Recollect fathers returned in 1749 and took charge until 1784. Since then, several priests administered the parish.

The church tower of Bolinao used to be the tallest in Pangasinan until an earthquake destroyed half of the tower in 1788. The church convent was accidentally burned in 1819.

The first priest was ordained in Bolinao Church in 1974. In 1985, it became a parish of the Diocese of Alaminos, previously being under the Diocese of Lingayen.

On May 7, 2009, the church was heavily devastated by Typhoon Emong and has since then been undergoing repairs and renovations.

=== Former parish priests ===
- Rev. Fr. Esteban Marin (1585-1587)
- Rev. Fr. Jeronimo de Cristo (1588-1598)
- Rev. Fr. Salvador Milan (1599-1600)
- Rev. Fr. Diego Aduarte (1599-1600)
- Rev. Fr. Francisco Martinez (1600-1602)
- Rev. Fr. Estacio Ortiz (1602-1607)
- Rev. Fr. Antonio Figueroa (1602-1607)
- Rev. Fr. Jeronimo de Cristo (1607-1608)
- PP Agustinos Recoletos (1609-1653)
- Rev. Fr. Giovanni de S. Girolamo (1654-1658)
- Rev. Fr. Bernardo de la Concepcion (1654-1658)
- Rev. Fr. Domingo de San Miguel (1654-1658)
- Rev. Fr. Juan de la Me de Dios (1658-1663)
- Rev. Fr. Luis de San Jose (1663-1670)
- Rev. Fr. Joseph dela Santissima Trinidad (1671-1681)
- Rev. Fr. Antonio de Sta. Maria (1681-1684)
- Rev. Fr. Juan de los Santos (1681-1684)
- Rev. Fr. Alfonso Villa (1684-1686)
- Rev. Fr. Juan de los Santos (1684-1686)
- Rev. Fr. Juan Fernandez (1686-1688)
- Rev. Fr. Jose Plana (1686-1688)
- Rev. Fr. Jose Solis (1688-1690)
- Rev. Fr. Tomas Siclat
- Rev. Fr. Tomas del Rosario
- Rev. Fr. Juan Fernandez
- Rev. Fr. Tomas del Rosario
- Rev. Fr. Blas Iglesias
- Rev. Fr. Felipe Fernandez
- Rev. Fr. Felipe Fernandez
- Rev. Fr. Antonio Perez
- Rev. Fr. Jose Plana
- Rev. Fr. Jeronimo Martin
- Rev. Fr. Antonio Perez
- Rev. Fr. Felipe Fernandez
- Rev. Fr. Francisco dela Natividad
- Rev. Fr. Juan de Sto Tomas
- Rev. Fr. Joseph del Angel Custodio
- Rev. Fr. Alonzo de San Nicolas
- Rev. Fr. Joseph de San Agustin
- Rev. Fr. Joseph de San Agustin
- Rev. Fr. Alonzo de San Gabriel
- Rev. Fr. Joseph del Angel Custodio
- Rev. Fr. Joseph de San Nicolas
- Rev. Fr. Alonzo de San Gabriel
- Rev. Fr. Joseph de San Nicolas
- Rev. Fr. Juan dela Asuncion
- Rev. Fr. Joseph dela Angel Custodio
- Rev. Fr. Joseph de San Joaquin
- Rev. Fr. Joel de San Jose (1726-1728)
- Rev. Fr. Juan de la Asuncion (1726-1728)
- Rev. Fr. Juan de la Asuncion (1728-1729)
- Rev. Fr. Santiago dela Encarnacion (1728-1729)
- Rev. Fr. Alonzo de San Gabriel (1728-1729)
- Rev. Fr. Joseph dela Concepcion (1728-1729)
- Rev. Fr. Santiago dela Encarnacion (1730)
- Rev. Fr. Joseph dela Concepcion (1730)
- Rev. Fr. Joseph dela San Joaquin (1730)

== Architectural features ==
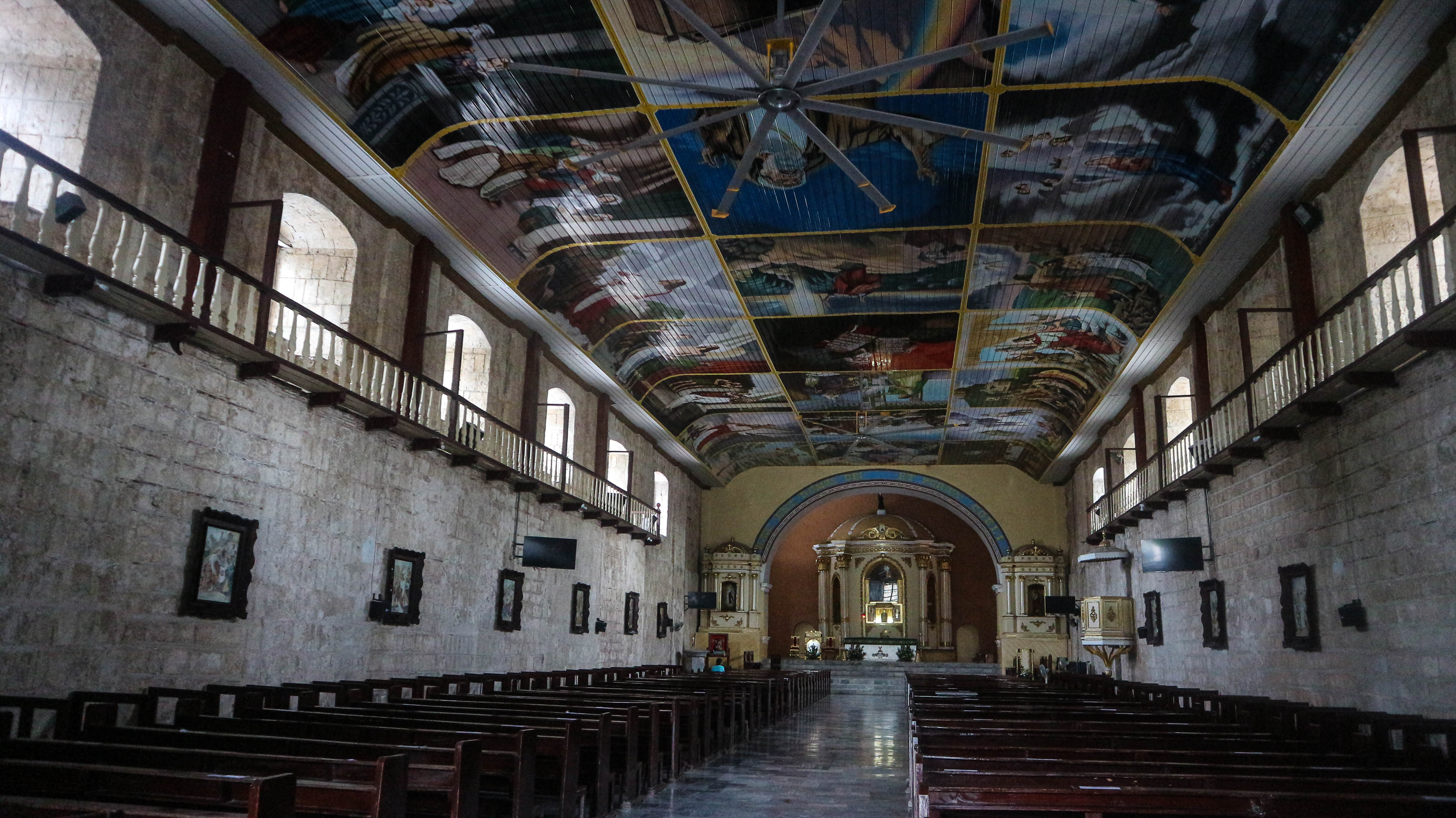
Church interior in 2019

Saint James the Great Parish is in High Renaissance style. One feature of the church is its trefoil arch main door. The overall design of the facade is plain and simple with the super-positioned columns alternating with window openings and tall blind arches conspicuously dominating the ends of the walls.

== Present condition ==
In front of the church is a marker stating that the first Mass on Philippine soil was celebrated in Bolinao Bay in 1324 by a Franciscan missionary, Blessed Odorico. However, Bl. Odoric being in the Philippines is highly doubted by scholars. Further, the National Historical Institute recognized the historical records of Limasawa in Southern Leyte as the venue of the first Mass, held on March 31, 1521.

=== Marker from the Saint James the Great Parish Church ===
St. James the Great Parish
Bolinao, Pangasinan, was canonically erected in the year 1609 when the Augustinian Friars took over this mission territory which was earlier entrusted by the Spanish Colonial Government to the Dominican Friars in the year 1594 and left the place in the year 1607 due to the vastness of their mission territories and the scarcity of their missionary members.

The Church tower of Bolinao measuring seventy-five (75) feet was then the tallest in the whole Pangasinan if not in the entire Northern Luzon. However, an earthquake in 1788 toppled about half of it. Then in 1819, the Church Convent was also accidentally burned.

== In popular culture ==
The town center of the Saint James the Great Parish Church in Bolinao, Pangasinan was one of the Miniland models featured at the Legoland Malaysia Resort. It was the only Philippine town featured at the said park.
