= Atala Apodaca Anaya =

Mexican revolutionary and feminist

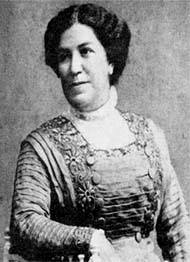

Atala Apodaca Anaya (9 April 1884 in Tapalpa – 31 August 1977 in Guadalajara) was a Mexican teacher, feminist and revolutionary. She is considered a feminist pioneer in Mexico because she campaigned for the active role of women in society, in politics and for broad popular education as a means of emancipation and social change.

== Life ==
Apodaca was one of four children of Julia Anaya and Praxedis Apodaca. The family belonged to the rural working class. She went to the Liceo de Niñas in the state of Jalisco until 1900. She then attended grammar school and trained as a teacher at the Escuela Normal para Señoritas, where she graduated on 28 October 1903. Between 1903 and 1912, she worked as a teacher at various schools in Mexico, including the Escuela de Niñas de Guadalajara (1905–1913) and the Escuela Práctica Anexa a la Normal (1913–1914).

During these first years of teaching, Apodaca was able to observe the poverty and exploitation in the countryside and in the city and experienced the poor working conditions for teaching staff first-hand. This and her acquaintance with liberal-democratic teachers such as Aurelia Guevara, Abel Anaya and Aurelio Ortega politicised Apodaca. Her participation in the electoral movement at the end of Porfirio Díaz's reign and Francisco Madero's presidential campaign radicalised her. Although she supported Madero's original political ideas, her participation in the electoral movement did not coincide with what Madero himself and other revolutionary politicians of the time thought about the role of women in the political process, as they believed that women's role should be limited to accompanying men in the fulfilment of their duties and not to active participation in political power. Their active participation challenged traditional gender roles.

Between 1912 and 1913, she joined the Liga de Amigos del Pueblo, a group of liberal intellectuals led by Luis Alatorre, a politician who ran for governor of Jalisco in 1912 and tried to enlighten the working class and combat the fanaticism of the time through plays, poems and speeches. Through the Liga, Apodaca got to know the Centro Bohemio, a cultural, political, progressive and anti-clerical group led by José Guadalupe Zuno. There she met Florencio Luna and J. Concepción Cortés, who introduced her to General Manuel M. Diéguez.

During the government of Victoriano Huerta, Apodaca carried out "anti-Huerta campaigns" by giving her own speeches or distributing and posting in public places the revolutionary speech that Senator Belisario Domínguez Palencia had given about Huerta's abuses on 23 September 1913, for which he was later assassinated.

During the Mexican Revolution, she actively participated in the armed struggle, particularly in a battle of the "Division of the North" (División del Norte) in February 1915 under the command of Dieguez.

After the fall of the Huerta government, she began working closely with the then interim governor Manuel M. Diéguez, as both held the Catholic Church responsible for the precarious living situation of the people in Jalisco. Diéguez valued her as an excellent teacher and speaker and appointed her school inspector. Apodaca was openly anti-clerical and campaigned for a series of educational, labour and social reforms. From 1914, she became increasingly involved as a lecturer and spokesperson for revolutionary and constitutional ideals throughout the country, together with Belén de Sárraga. In August 1914, she founded and led the Círculo Josefa Ortiz de Domínguez in Jalisco, together with her sister Laura Apodaca and a larger group of female teachers who gave weekly lectures at the Teatro Degollado for female teachers, state high school students and allies of the revolutionary struggle, with the aim of integrating more women into the Constitutionalists party.

On 26 November 1917, Atala Apodaca married Samuel Ruiz Cabañas Bustamante in the church El Vate.

In 1918, together with other female teachers and workers, she founded the Centro Radical Femenino, which supported this revolutionary anti-clerical stance. The Centro ran a newspaper, El Iconoclasta and a Sunday school dependent on the workers' organisation Casa del Obrero Mundial, in which children were taught the principles of social justice, solidarity and freedom. In the conservative environment of the Tapatíos, her anti-clerical stance earned her criticism and disregard for her social merits.

From 1916 to 1917, she was president of the "Commission for Nationalist Studies and Propaganda" founded by Venustiano Carranza. The aim of this commission was to spread the ideals and principles of the revolution throughout the country through the popular magazine Argos

From 1920 to 1940, she lived in Mexico City, where she worked again as a teacher, headmistress and school inspector. After her return to Guadalajara, Jalisco, in the mid-1940s, she was not only headmistress of the José Clemente Orozco school, but also a pedagogical counsellor at the Jalisco Ministry of Education. From 1962 until her retirement, she was an inspector for the school system.

In 1946, she was recognised by the Ministry of Defence as a "Veteran of the Revolution". The government of Jalisco also honoured her work as a teacher by awarding her the medal Mtro. Manuel López Cotilla medal in 1946 and 1957. In 1963, the Ministry of Defence admitted her to the Mexican Legion of Honour (Legión de Honor Mexicana).

Apodaca died of stomach cancer on 31 August 1977 at the age of 93.

On 20 November 2013, her name was added to the list of the most famous Mexican veterans. On 20 November 2013, her name was unveiled as one of four women on a 22-person list of honour in the Salón de Sesiones of Guadalajara City Hall.

== Feminist positions ==
Apodaca was ahead of her time. She pursued the approach, which she advocated in the popular magazine Argos among others, that educating women to be free, valuable and proactive would make men see them as equals: "She will be the teacher and the enterprising one who educates herself for herself and for society, and no longer for a man who acts as her master". She represented a new archetype of the Mexican woman: intelligent, politically active and anti-clerical, which is why she was often vilified by conservatives as "unfeminine". Even within the liberal movement, she broke with the stereotype of the passive Catholic woman who opposes social progress

She blamed the Catholic Church for the educational backwardness of women. While she did not question the role of women as mothers and wives, she believed that this role should be expanded through access to education and secularisation, and argued for the inclusion of an ideal of women as modern, secular women and active participants in public life: "The free and educated woman, who is the exception today, will be the rule in the future, and women will then put their qualities at the service of human progress."
