= Attla =

Attla may refer to:

- George Attla, Alaska Sports Hall of Fame inductee and dog musher
- Attla (film), 1979 film about George Attla
- Attla, codename of an Intel Corporation computer LAN controller
- Attla River, near Ramayapalem in Marripudi Mandal, India
- Attla, Dutch launch boat that aided the crew of the USS S-36 (SS-141) submarine as it sank in January 1942
