= Andrew Atalla =

British businessman

Andrew Atalla (born May 5, 1980) is an Entrepreneur and founder of London-based online marketing agency atom42 in April 2007, and won the Startups.co.uk Young Entrepreneur of the Year award in November 2009.

Clients of atom42 include match.com, The Huffington Post and National Accident Helpline.

Atalla was also mentioned in MediaWeek’s ’30 under 30’ feature in 2005, representing the best young talent in the media industry.

In 2013, atom42 received four awards for their work on The Huffington Post's "Conversations Start Here" campaign.
