= Ann Eliza Smith =

American author (1819-1905)

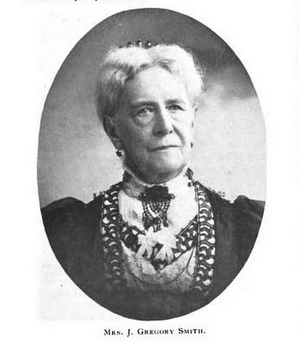
- From the January 1899 edition of The Vermonter magazine
- Born: Ann Eliza Brainerd; October 7, 1819; St. Albans, Vermont, U.S.
- Died: January 6, 1905 (aged 85); St. Albans, Vermont, U.S.
- Resting place: Greenwood Cemetery, St. Albans, Vermont
- Occupation: Author
- Spouse: J. Gregory Smith (m. 1842)
- Children: 6 (including Edward Curtis Smith)
- Relatives: Lawrence Brainerd
- Writing career
- Pen name: Mrs. J. Gregory Smith
- Language: English
- Period: Late 1800s
- Genre: Novels
- Notable work: Atla

Ann Eliza Smith (pen name, Mrs. J. Gregory Smith; October 7, 1819 – January 6, 1905) was an American author. She was president of the board of managers for the Vermont woman's exhibit at the Centennial Exposition of 1876, at Philadelphia, and was frequently chosen in similar capacities as a representative of Vermont women. During the Civil War, she coordinated a response to the Confederate raid on St. Albans on October 19, 1864. In 1870, Governor Peter T. Washburn, who had served as adjutant general of the Vermont Militia during the war, recognized her efforts and presented her with an honorary commission as a lieutenant colonel on his military staff.

== Early life and education ==
Ann Eliza Brainerd was born in St. Albans, Vermont on October 7, 1819. The daughter of Senator Lawrence Brainerd and Fidelia B. Gadcombe, she was raised and educated in St. Albans.

== Career ==
In 1842, she married J. Gregory Smith, who served as Governor during the Civil War. They were the parents of six children, including Edward Curtis Smith, who also served as governor.

=== Author ===
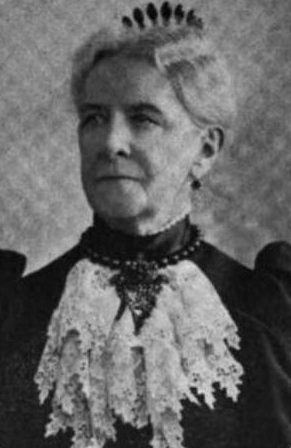
From the December, 1901 issue of The Vermonter magazine

Smith wrote essays, poems and other works, and is best known for her three novels, Seola, Selma, and Atla. Her first published work, From Dawn to Sunrise (1876) dealt with the historical and philosophical religious ideas of mankind. Its success caused Henry K. Adams, author of A Centennial History of St. Albans Vermont to call it "[t]he smartest book ever written in Vermont." Her second work was Seola (1878), which was written as an antediluvian diary. The next novel published was Selma (1883), a Viking love story. The third novel, Atla (New York: Harper & Brothers, 1886), was about the sinking of the legendary lost island called Atlantis. At least one reviewer, The Churchman, was highly critical of it:—

Mrs. J. Gregory Smith, under the guise of fiction, has here endeavored to embody an idea of the stupendous civilization of the fabled Garden of the Hesperides, the Argonauts' Island of Flowers, and to describe the awful cataclysm by which, so runs the record of Hindu geology, it was destroyed eleven thousand four hundred years ago. The desired idea is hardly embodied, though the author is clearly of opinion that luscious description and highly colored orientalisms in language are of themselves all that is necessary to reproduce in English the gorgeous realism of an ancient legend. More is needed, and Mrs. J. Gregory Smith does not possess that more.

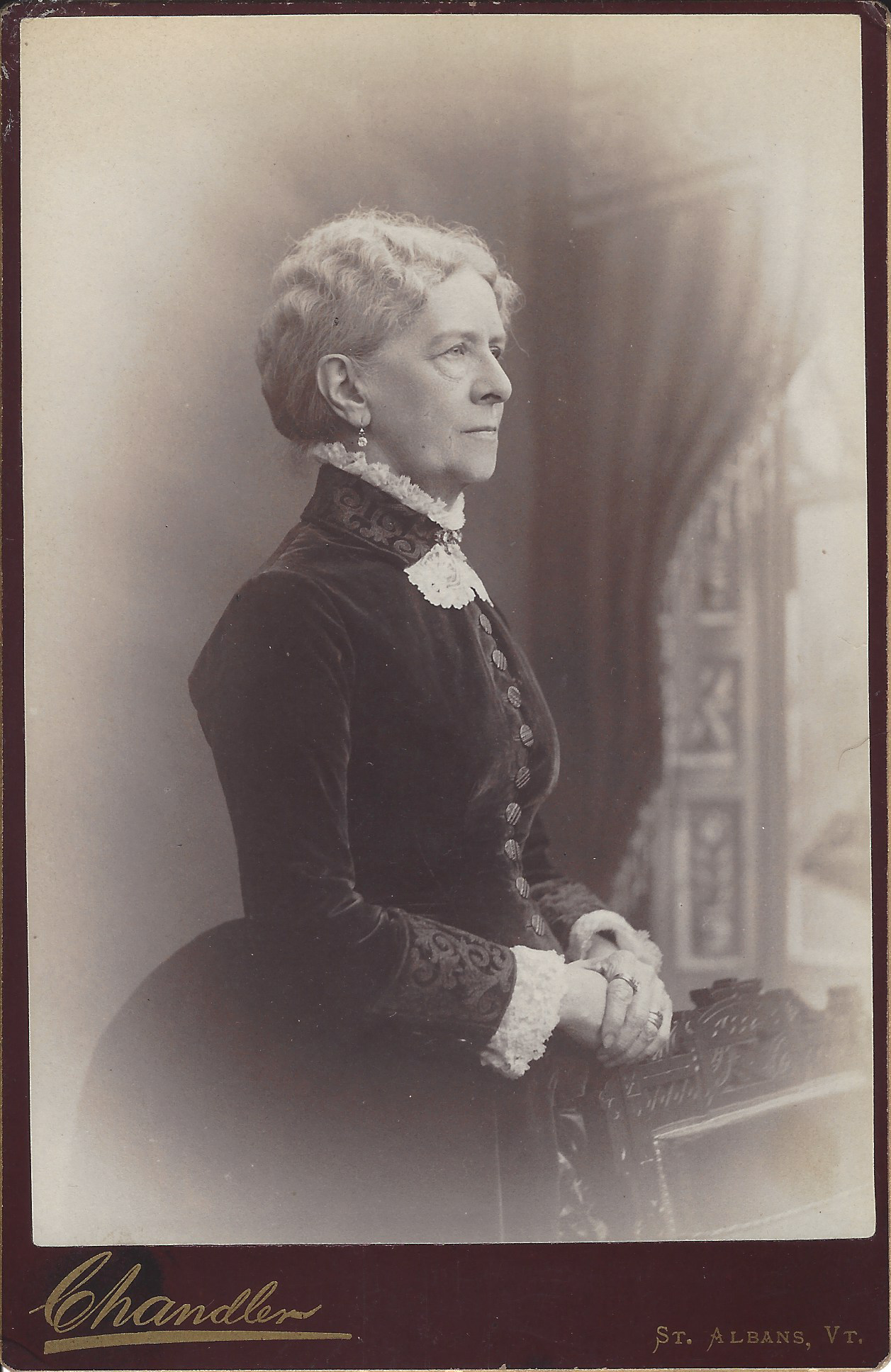
Undated cabinet photo by W. D. Chandler of St. Albans, Vermont

In 1924, Seola was revised by the "Bible Students"—later known as Jehovah's Witnesses—and retitled Angels and Women. Smith usually wrote under her married name, Mrs. J. Gregory Smith, but both Seola and Angels and Women were published anonymously; they were later ascribed to her by the Library of Congress.

=== St. Albans Raid ===
On the afternoon of October 19, 1864, the northernmost land event of the Civil War occurred, the St. Albans Raid. Confederates infiltrated the town, robbed several banks, wounded two citizens (one mortally), and fled north to Canada. Since he was serving as governor, the home of J. Gregory Smith was a target of the raid. Governor Smith was not at home, and when Mrs. Smith appeared in the front doorway carrying an unloaded pistol (the only weapon she could find), the raiders decided to bypass the house. She then worked to organize the people of St. Albans to mount a pursuit of the raiders, which unsuccessfully attempted to prevent them from escaping to Canada.

For her actions in defending the Smith home and efforts to rally the people of St. Albans in pursuing the raiders, Governor Washburn named Mrs. Smith a brevet lieutenant colonel on his staff. Washburn, who served as governor from 1869 until his death in 1870, had served in the Union Army early in the Civil War, and then spent the rest of the conflict as Adjutant General of the Vermont Militia. Under Washburn's direction, units of the militia had attempted to pursue the Confederate raiders, and later patrolled the border with Canada to ensure there were no further efforts to conduct Confederate activities in Vermont.

Smith wrote of her personal reminiscences of the St. Albans Raid in The Vermonter:—

"It was a dreary day, heavy clouds constantly. Mr. Smith, the Governor, was in Montpelier, the Legislature being in session. My eldest son George, was in Andover at school, our coachman was in Burlington for the day on a matter of business, the garden men had gone to a cider mill with a load of apples, Edward my second son, ten years old, was with them, the farm hands were at a distance harvesting potatoes. About four o'clock, while I was engaged in domestic duties, my young daughters with me, one an infant in arms, a servant girl from our nearest neighbors rushed in greatly excited saying, "The rebels are in town, robbing the banks, burning the houses and killing the people. They are on their way up the hill intending to burn your house." This was indeed alarming. The union troops had recently burned the mansions of Gov. Letcher in Virginia. and of Gov. Brown in Georgia. What a grand retaliation if they could burn the residence of Gov. Smith in this northernmost state

"Yet as the result proved, plunder, not revenge, was the motive. Our great danger was only too apparent. no men on the premises, my daughters were too young for aid or counsel, perceiving something dreadful had happened they began to cry; there were no telephones in those days, I could not summon immediate help, my friends in town no doubt had all they could do to preserve their own lives and property. I cannot say I was frightened, the peril and gravity of the situation steadied me. I called my servant girls and told them of our danger. Only one kept her head, a Scotch girl, Emma Inglis. I called her ever afterward my lieutenant. We closed every blind and shade, bolted every door but the front one. My first impulse was to run up the flag that if we went down it might be with flying colors, but realizing the rashness of such an act I desisted. "Shall we get out the hose?" said Emma. "No," I answered. "If the rogues see it they will at once cut the hose, but if they fire the buildings we will attach it to the hydrant and do the best to save them, for the wretches will probably leave as soon as they set the fire." When these arrangements were completed I began a search for weapons. I found a large horse pistol that had recently been presented to Mr. Smith and went out on the front steps of the house with it in my hand. There were no bullets, all I could hope for was to intimidate—they would not surely fire upon a woman. I saw a horseman galloping up the hill. "The hour has come," I mentally exclaimed, "this is the advance of the raiders." But as the rider turned into the carriage way I perceived him to be Stewart Stranahan, my sister's husband, who had been in the army of the Potomac on Custer's staff, but was now home on sick leave. "The raiders have gone north," he said; "after robbing the banks, killing one man, wounding others and setting buildings on fire, they stole horses and are now on their way to Sheldon, foregoing their design to fire this place for fear of losing the plunder, for though they came part way up the hill, they faltered, turned back and fled on another road. We shall pursue them, I came for arms." "Here, take this pistol," I said, "it is all I have yet found, and, Stewart, if you come up with them, kill them! kill them : " I never before felt so murderous, the frenzy of battle was upon me—the blood of the old Norse King's stirred in my veins. "Of course we will," Stewart answered, and hurried away. At that moment the cook came running in to say that some men were at the barn after horses. I tore through the house and out to the stable, where I found no enemies, but some of our own townspeople who said the raiders had taken so many horses from the village there were not enough left for the pursuit. Our stalls were full, I gave them first my own saddle horse. "Major," I said, "has been in the war, he will behave well." They then took three others, all that were required, and went off without delay. Two of the horses were injured in that pursuit; they were never sound afterward. Returning to the house, I found the girls had discovered a rifle. I took this on my shoulder and started for the village. Before going many rods I met a man whom I recognized as one of our townspeople. He said "I am after arms, the southerners have bought or borrowed almost everything we had in town." "Take this rifle.' I said, "it is a good one; I was on my way to offer it."

"All these men told the same story of ruin wrought in the village, exaggerated of course by the excitement of the hour. I went back to the house and tried to calm my nerves so as to be prepared for the next emergency. Presently some friends came in to assure me that immediate danger was over, the enemy had left town and a resolute party were in hot pursuit. Meantime exciting events were in progress elsewhere. The telegraph operator in St. Albans had sent this message to the Governor: "Southern raiders are in town, robbing banks, shooting citizens, and burning houses." Forgetting the alarm and anxiety that would follow such a message, without further ceremony he locked his office and rushed away to join the excited crowds that now thronged the streets. Mr. Smith had just been informed through other sources that trouble might be expected from the refugees in Canada. Raids were plotted all along the border, the object of which was to seize railroad trains, rob banks, and burn towns. He had called a council consisting of the Adjutant General and two other gentlemen, and was at that moment in earnest consultation as to what course was advisable, when in rushed a messenger pale and too much excited to speak and thrust a dispatch into his hand. Mr. Smith read it aloud, and in speaking of the circumstance afterward, said "There were three pale, astonished men in that group. I didn't see the fourth." His first order was "Stop every train on the railroad, call back that which has just left Montpelier Junction. Being President of the road, there was not an instant's delay. In vain did he telegraph St. Albans for further information. There was no response, and the distracting inference was that the raiders had possession of the telegraph line as well as the town and the railroad. His first impulse was to St. Albans instantly, his family and home were in peril; a second thought brought his public duty to mind, the conspiracy might involve the entire northern border of the state. he must remain at the seat of government. He sent an order to the United States hospital at Montpelier, and in a brief time a squad from the veteran invalid corps took the recalled train and hastened to St. Albans.

"Late in the evening our door bell rang and a soldier enquired for the lady of the house. I answered the summons and saw a tall man in military uniform. He saluted and said: "Madam, I am the officer of the guard. I come to you for orders." I raised my eyes in astonishment claiming solemnly, "My God, is this a military Station. War in northern Vermont. Terrible." Turning to the corporal I said, "I have no orders to give, make yourselves as comfortable as you can in the outbuildings, if there is trouble do whatever your judgment dictates." The next morning, two additional companies arrived to guard the town, a home guard of infantry and cavalry were organized, the streets were regularly patrolled and suspicious persons were arrested. Great excitement and apprehension prevailed, strange fireworks were thrown up at night, a barn west of the village was burned. On this occasion, the corporal came to me for orders, I told him he might take his men to aid in extinguishing the fire. He respectfully suggested that this might be a ruse of the enemy to draw the guard from their post and give opportunity to burn our buildings. I assented at once to his superior sagacity and the guard remained. The U.S. troops and the Home Guard assembled in 15 minutes, but a pouring rain came on and their services were not required. No doubt the fire was of incendiary origin. We were greatly frightened. I shall never forget the cries of my little children wakened from sleep by the confusion."

== Death and legacy ==
Smith died in St. Albans on January 6, 1905. She was buried at Greenwood Cemetery. The town of Brainerd, Minnesota was named in her honor.

== Selected works ==
- Seola
- The iceberg's story, 1881
- Selma, 1883
- Notes of travel in Mexico and California , 1886
- Poems : "gather up the fragments", 1889
- Lines to a cricket, holograph poem found in the... by J Gregory Smith, Mrs., 1901
- Atla: A Story of the Lost Island, 1886
- From dawn to sunrise : a review, historical and philosophical of the religious ideas of mankind, 1876
- Personal reminiscences of early life in Vermont : published in the St. Albans Daily Messenger, starting November 22, 1924
- Angels and women
