= Atla (river) =

River in Estonia

Atla River
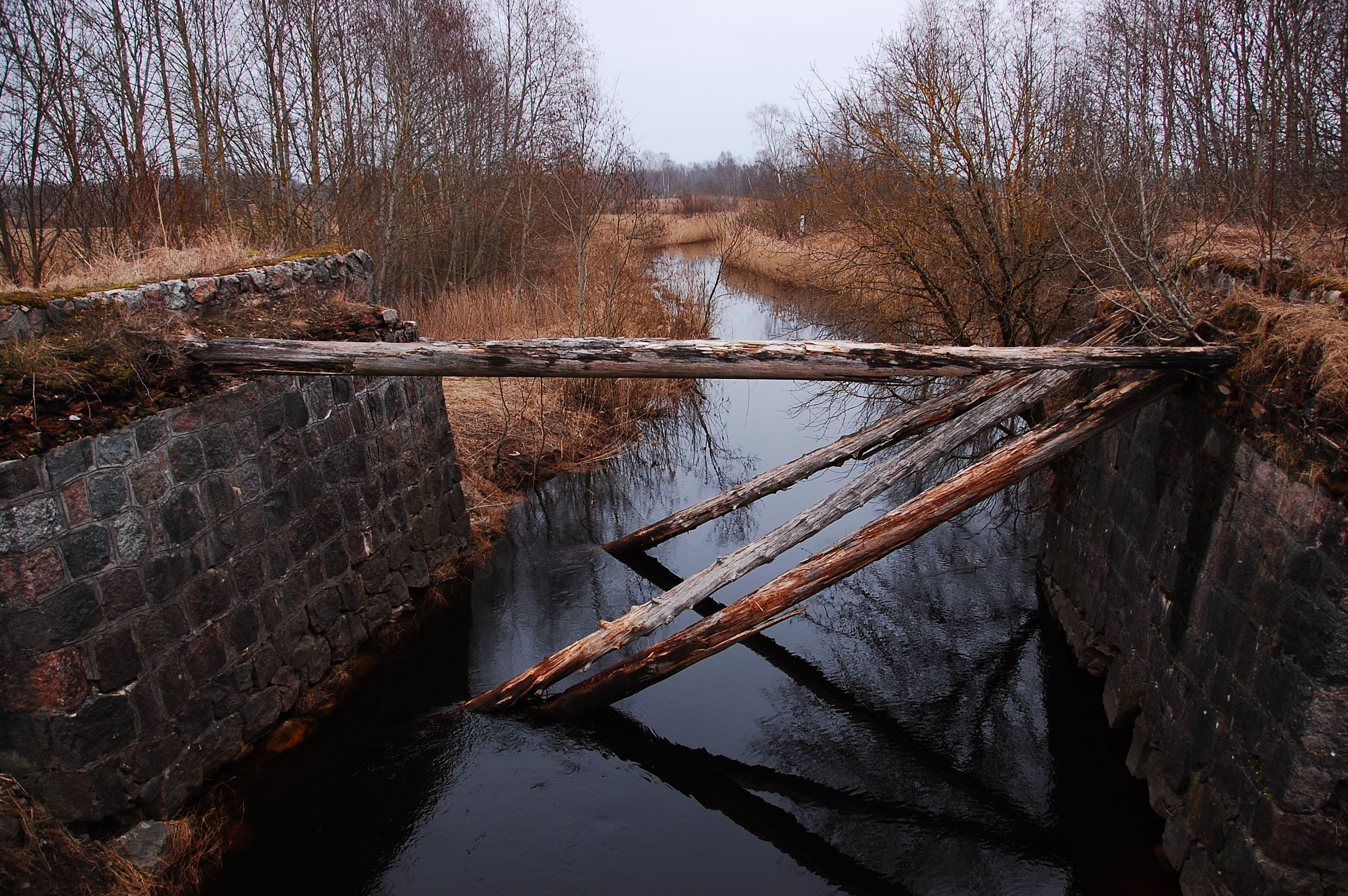

Location
- Country: Estonia

Physical characteristics
- Mouth: Keila River
  - coordinates: 59°06′16″N 24°49′09″E
- Length: 34.2 km
- Basin size: 130.5 km²

The Atla River is a river in Rapla County, Estonia. The river is 34.2 km long and basin size is 130.5 km^{2}. It empties into the Keila River.
