= Atla: A Story of the Lost Island =

1886 novel by Ann Eliza Smith

Atla
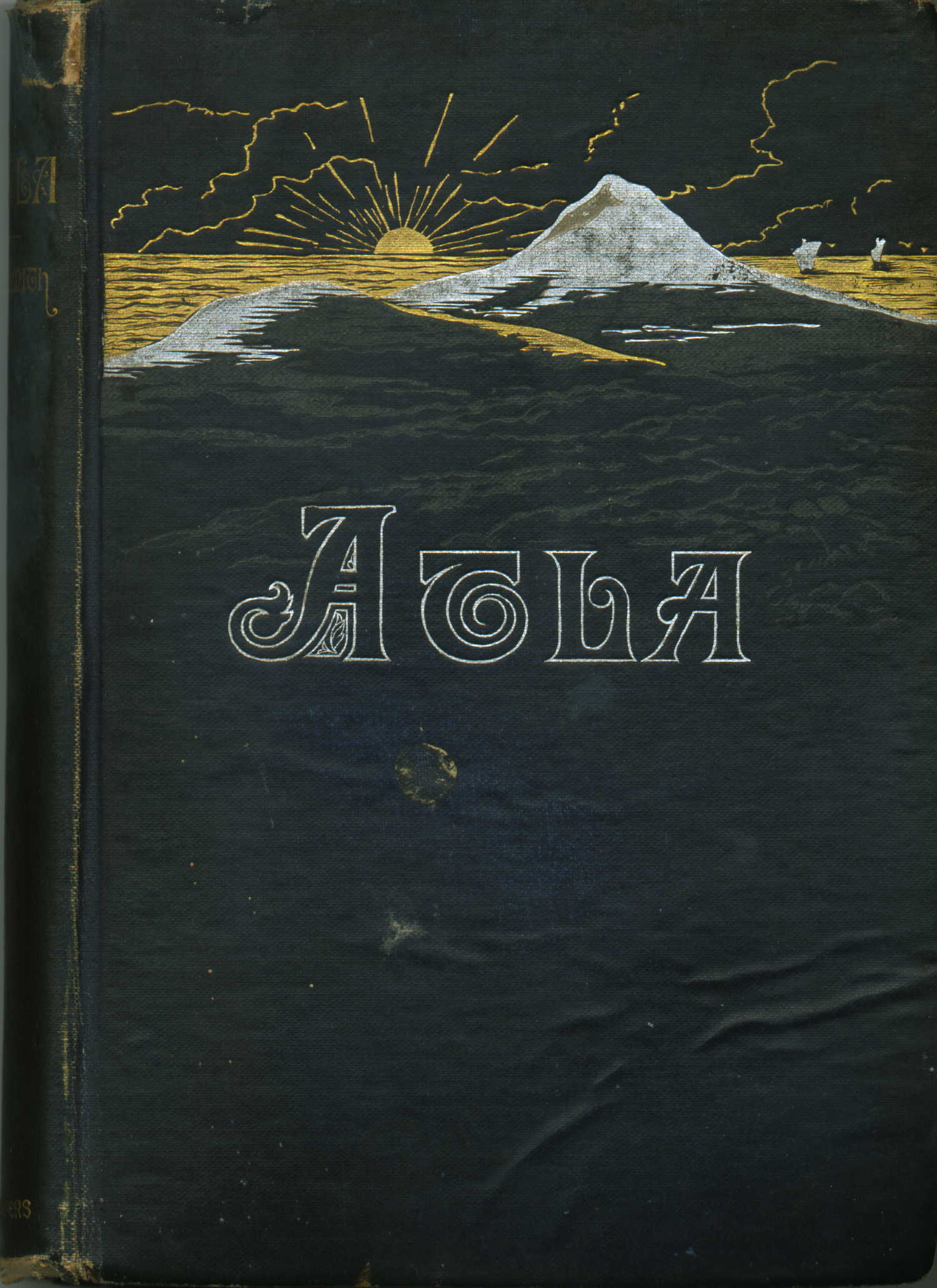
- Author: Ann Eliza Smith
- Language: English
- Genre: Fantasy
- Publisher: Harpers & Brothers
- Publication date: 1886
- Publication place: United States
- Media type: Print (Hardback)
- Pages: 284
- OCLC: 2082154
- LC Class: PZ3.S6418 At

Atla: A Story of the Lost Island is a fantasy novel by Ann Eliza Smith. It was published in 1886 by Harper & Brothers. It is a tale about the discovery of the Atlantis civilization by the Phoenicians.

== Plot ==
As the story opens, the fierce, barbaric empire of Atlantis is ruled by King Kron. His brother Thalok is high priest of the bloody state cult, which demands human sacrifices, hearts torn out in Aztec fashion. Kron’s wife has given birth to a daughter, who is called Astera and at this same time a beautiful blond woman is shipwrecked on the Atlantean coast. She dies after giving birth to a girl who grows up as the bosom companion to Astera. King Kron names the orphaned child Atla.

When the young women are about twenty years old, Prince Herekla of Cacara in Phoenicia invents the magnetic compass. Herekla derives the basic idea from Chinese merchants. King Kron recognizes the power of Phoenicia, and is willing to betroth his daughter to Herekla. Herekla comes to Atlantis to accept his bride. Love, however, does not honor contracts, for Herekla and Atla fall in love. Astera, in turn, falls in love with Zemar, the virtuous son of the vile, ruthless priest Thalok.

Thalok, who has long lusted for the throne and the gorgeous blond Atla, murders Kron, usurps the crown, and is about to start his persecutions. But as the four lovers flee Atlantis in various ways (agreeing to meet at the island of Surchi), Atlantis sinks beneath the sea. Thalok, in pursuit of the refugees, is killed by a poisonous serpent, the pet of an amorous sorceress-lover he had discarded.

The lovers now pair off. Zemar and Astera go to found a new Atlantis in the west, presumably Central America, while Herekla and Atla make their way to Phoenicia. As a Magian explains, when moral virtue is dead, physical changes take place, with catastrophe the result. This is why Atlantis sank.

== Publication ==
Atla was written by Ann Eliza Smith (credited as Ms. J. Gregory Smith). It was published in 1886 by Harper & Brothers.

== Reception ==
The Muscatine Daily Journal praised the novel: "Imagination, fancy, simplicity of style, and graphic powers of description, make of Atla a prose poem so charming and fascinating, that each reader has to acknowledge that he is under a spell." The Cleveland Leader praised it as "ingenious" and "absorbing". The New England Farmer described it as having a "moral tone", and therefore suitable for young readers.
