= Cape Bolinao Lighthouse =

Historic lighthouse in Pangasinan, Philippines

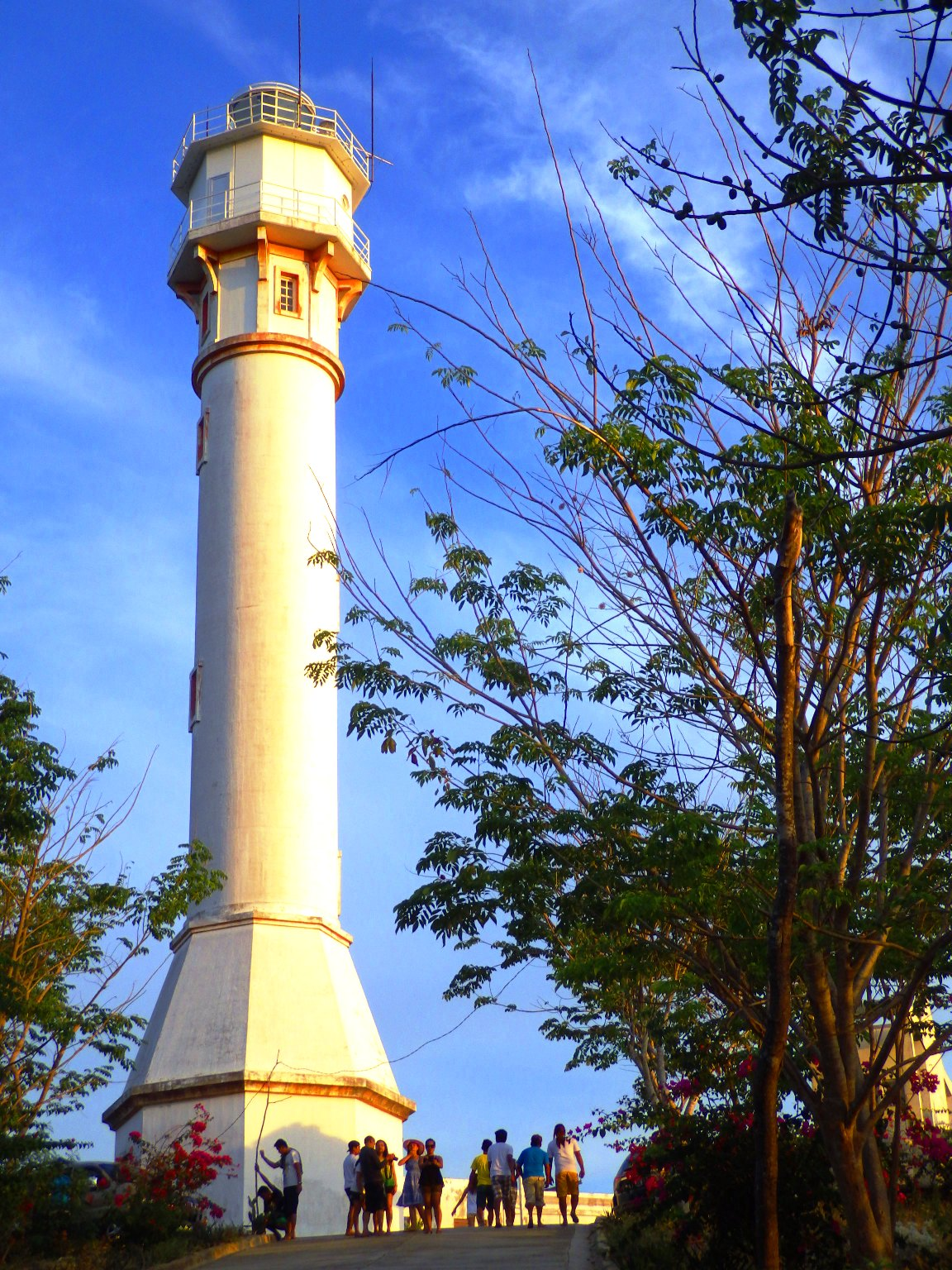
- The lighthouse in 2015
- Location: Bolinao, Pangasinan, Philippines
- Coordinates: 16°18′26″N 119°47′08″E

Tower
- Constructed: 1905
- Height: 30.78 m (101.0 ft)
- Markings: White
- Operator: Philippine Coast Guard

Light
- First lit: 1906
- Focal height: 107 m (351 ft)
- Range: 22 nmi (41 km; 25 mi)
- Characteristic: Fl(2) W 10s, Fl W 5s

The Cape Bolinao Lighthouse is a historic lighthouse in Bolinao, Pangasinan, Philippines. It was built in 1905 by a trio of American, British and Filipino engineers. Situated at an elevation of 107 meters (351 ft) above sea level, it is the second highest lighthouse in the Philippines next to the Cape Bojeador Lighthouse. The lighthouse tower itself stands 30.78 meters (101.0 ft) high.

The original third order equipment of the Cape Bolinao Lighthouse was made in England with the lantern sourced from France. The apparatus of the lighthouse was replaced by a close replica by Filipino mechanics. Until the 1980s, The lighthouse apparatus ran on kerosene until the 1980s, when it was connected to the power grid operated by the Pangasinan Electric Cooperative.

The Philippine Coast Guard became the sole owner of the Cape Bolinao Lighthouse under the Adopt-a-Lighthouse Program.
