= Silaki Island =

Island in Bolinao, Pangasinan, Philippines

Coordinates: 16°26′31″N 119°55′23″E

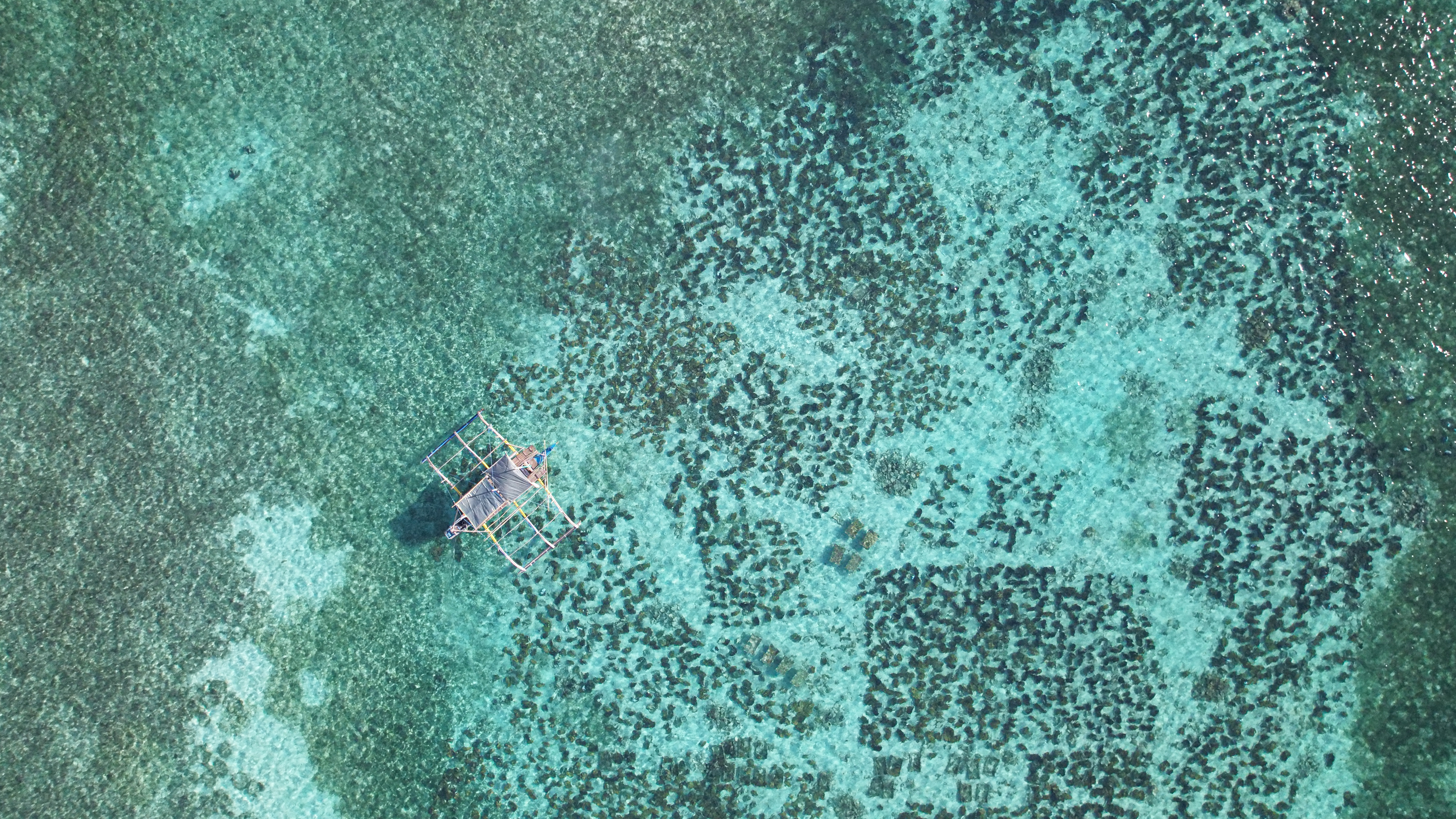
- Aerial shot of part of the reefs around the island.
- Interactive map of Silaki Island

Geography
- Location: Bolinao

Administration
- Philippines
- Province: Pangasinan
- Municipality: Bolinao

Demographics
- Population: 376

Silaki Island is a heart-shaped island located in Bolinao, Pangasinan, Philippines. The 10-hectare islet has 89 households equal to a population of 376. It is tagged as the "Giant Clam Capital of the Philippines" because of the shallow reefs surrounding the island in an almost 16 hectares of the ocean that is home to giant clams locally known as taklobo. The reefs serve as a giant clam nursery and hatchery and is managed by the Bolinao Marine Laboratory (BML) of the University of the Philippines Marine Science Institute (UPMSI).

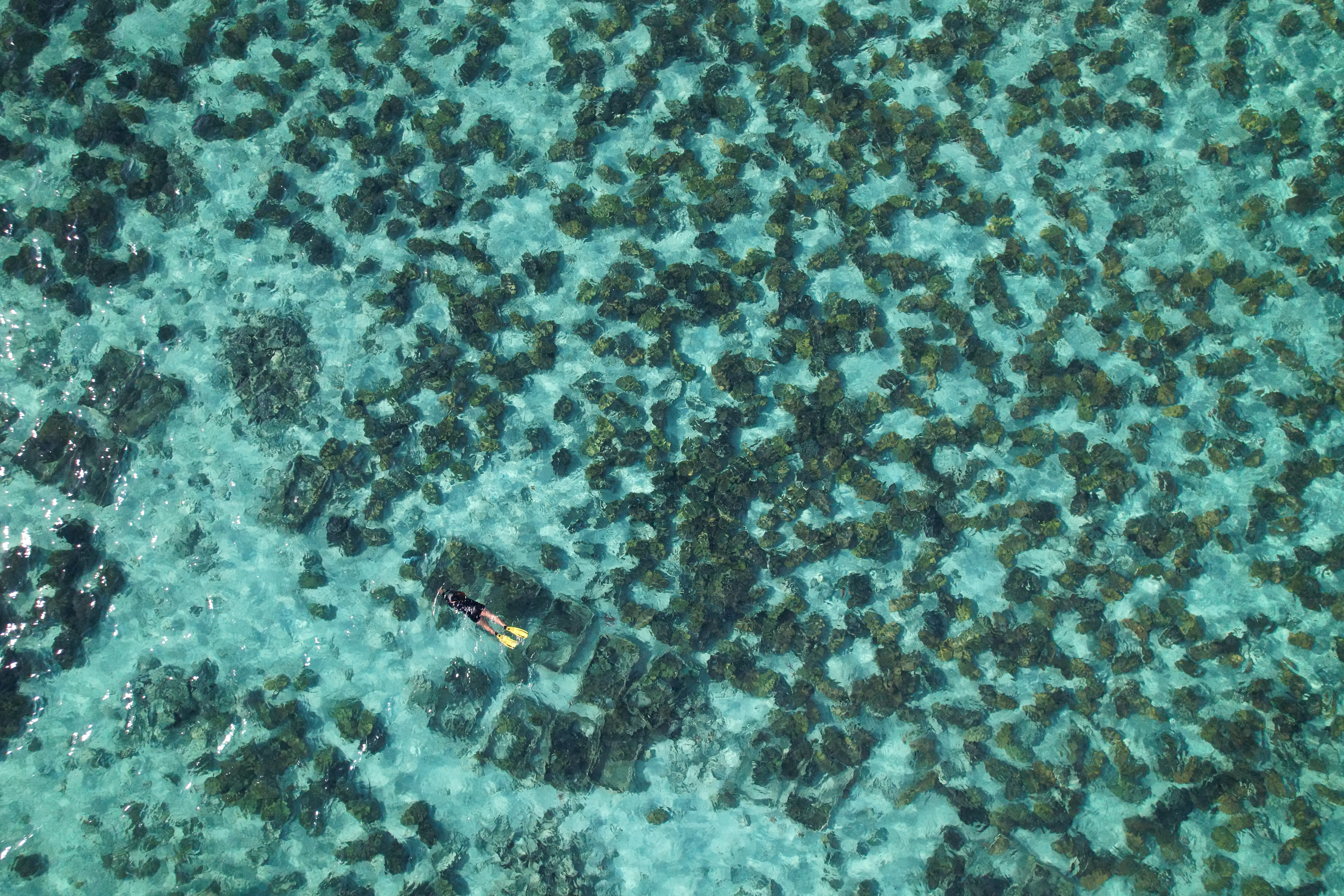
A part of the Giant Clam Nursery in Silaki Island, viewed from above

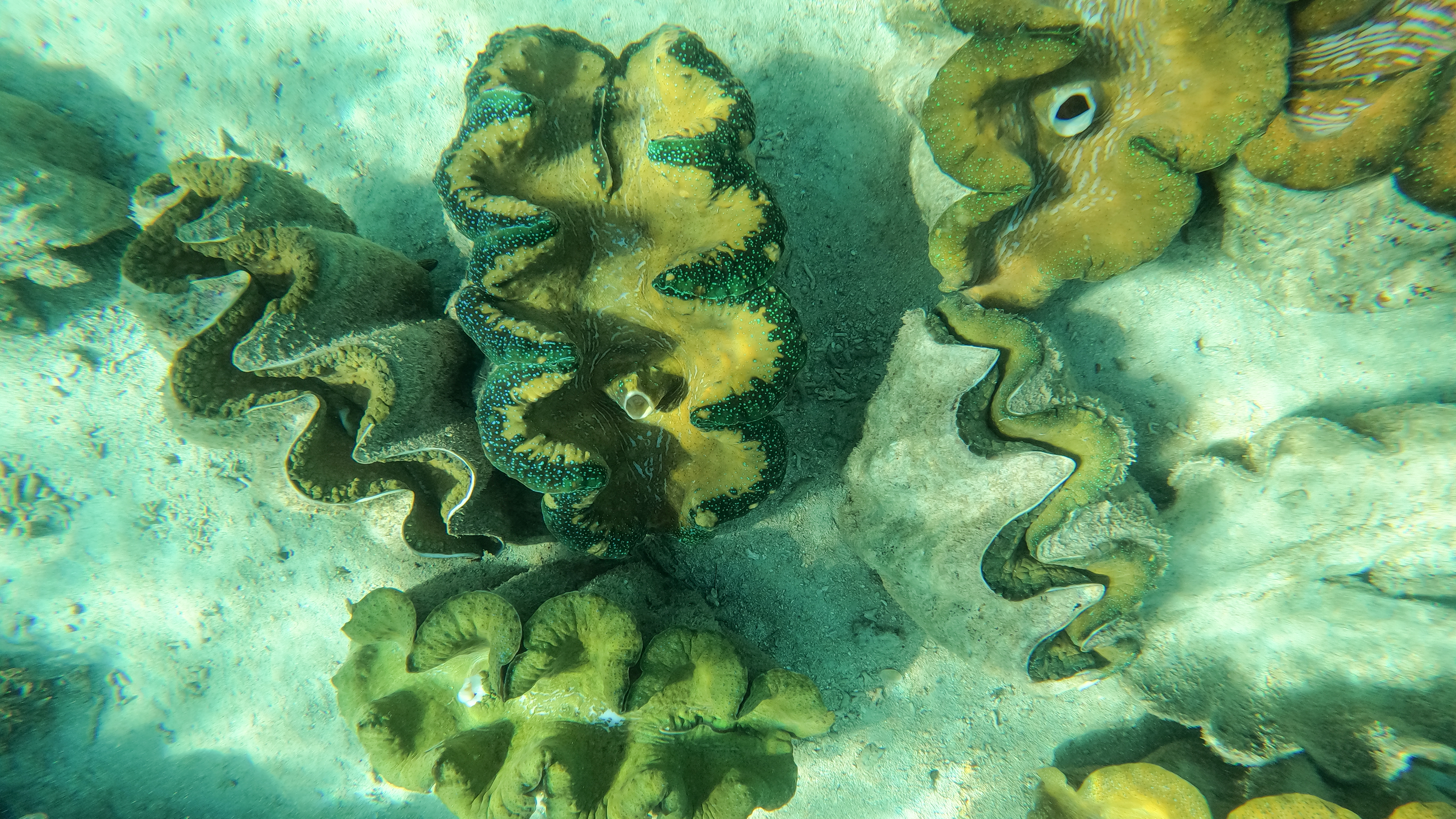
Underwater close-up shot of giant clams in Silaki Island

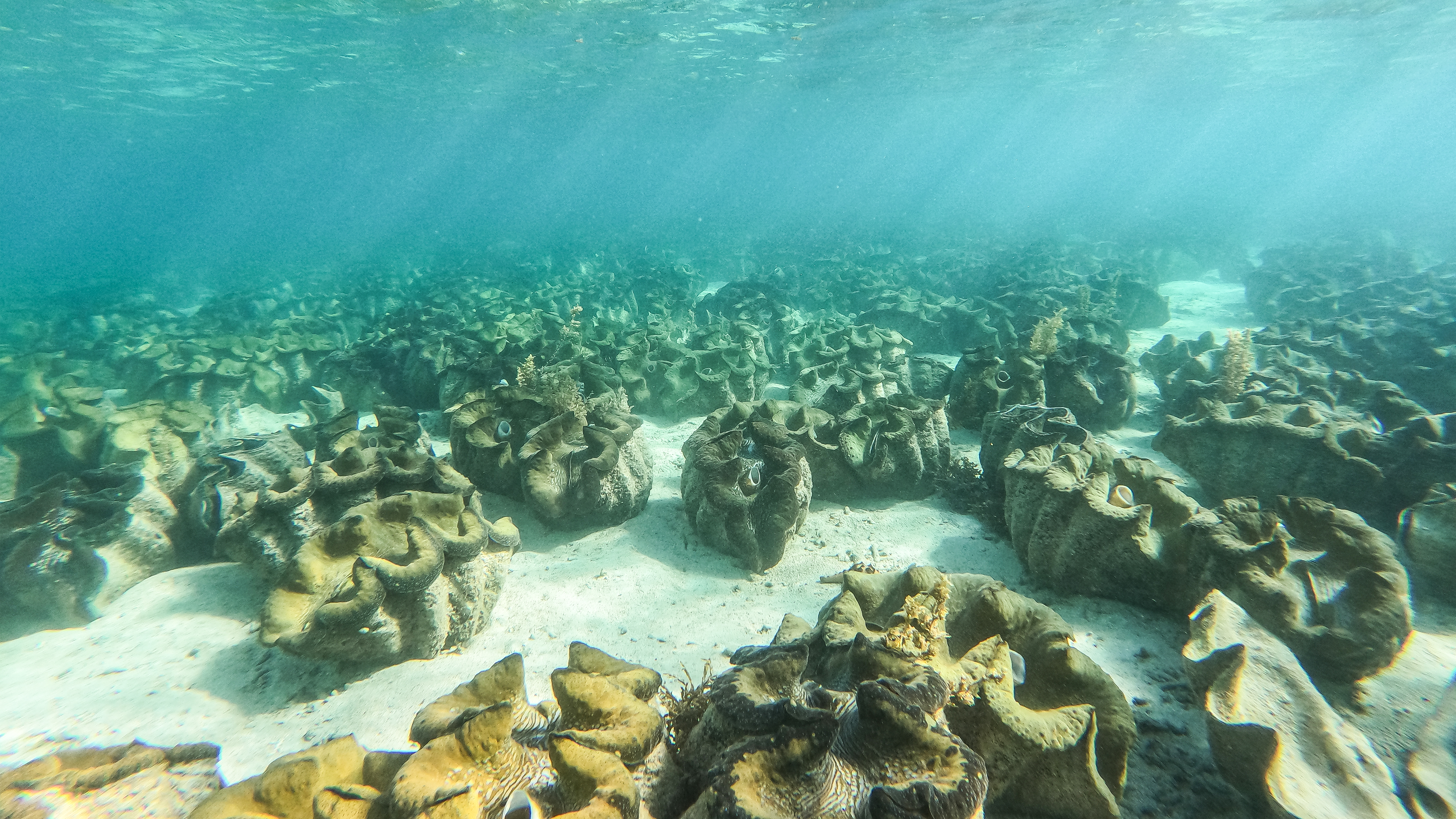
Another underwater shot of giant clams in Silaki Island

== Tourism ==
=== The Legacy of the Sea: A Silaki Island Community-Based Tourism Project ===
On April 15, 2024, Bolinao mayor Alfonso D. Celeste and Vice Mayor Richard C. Celeste received the ₱20 million award from the Department of Tourism's Tourism Champions Challenge program after Bolinao placed third in the contest for its development of "The Legacy of the Sea: A Silaki Island Community-Based Tourism Project." In partnership with the Marine Science Institute, Bolinao tourism officer Mary de Guzman-Suarez explained that the project provides a "fishing village experience, giant clams tour, fossilized giant clams and artifacts mini-museum and birdwatching trail in the island." She further explained that while it promotes Bolinao as the "Giant Clam Capital of the Philippines", the tourist attraction respects biodiversity and nature conservation.
