= First Mass in the Philippines =

1521 Mass during Magellan's expedition

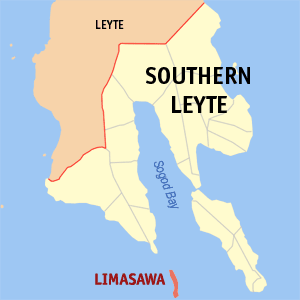
- Location of Limasawa
- Date: March 31, 1521 (Easter Sunday)
- Location: Limasawa, Southern Leyte

The first documented Catholic Mass in the Philippines was held on March 31, 1521, Easter Sunday. It was conducted by Father Pedro de Valderrama of Ferdinand Magellan's expedition along the shores of what was referred to in the journals of Antonio Pigafetta as "Mazaua".

Today, this site is widely believed by many historians and the government to be Limasawa off the tip of Southern Leyte, However, until at least the 19th century, the prevailing belief was that the first mass was held in Butuan. This belief is maintained by some, who assert that the first mass was instead held at Masao, Butuan.

To end the conflict for the issue about the first mass, the National Historical Commission of the Philippines (NHCP) panel adapted the recommendation and unanimously agreed that the evidence and arguments presented by the pro-Butuan advocates are not sufficient and convincing enough to warrant the repeal or reversal of the ruling on the case by the National Historical Institute (the NHCP's forerunner). It is further strengthened by the evidence that it was only after 22 years, in 1543—when a Spanish expedition led by Ruy López de Villalobos landed in Mindanao.

== Landing on Philippine shores ==
When Ferdinand Magellan and where European crew sailed from Sanlúcar de Barrameda for an expedition to search for spices, these explorers landed on the Philippines after their voyage from other proximate areas. On March 28, 1521, while at sea, they saw a bonfire which turned out to be Mazaua (believed to be today's Limasawa) where they anchored.

=== Log of Francisco Albo ===
On March 16, 1521, as they sailed in a westerly course from the Islas de los Ladrones, known today as the Mariana Islands, they saw land towards the northwest but they didn't land there due to shallow places and later found its name as Yunagan. On that same day, they went in a small island called Suluan which is a part of Samar and there they anchored. Leaving from those two islands, they sailed westward to an island of Gada where they took in a supply of wood and water from that island, they sailed towards west to a large island called Seilani (now Leyte). Along the coast of Seilani, they sailed southwards and turned southwest until they reached the island of Mazava. From there, they sailed northwards again towards the Island of Seilani and followed the coast of Seilani towards northwest and saw three small islands. They sailed westwards and saw three islets where they anchored for the night. In the morning, they sailed southwest. There, they entered canal between two island, one of which was called Sugbu (now called Cebu) and the other was Matan (now called Mactan). They sailed towards southwest on that canal then turned westward and anchored at the town of Sugbu wherein they stayed there for many days.

=== Diary of Antonio Pigafetta ===
Antonio Pigafetta was a famous Italian traveler who studied navigation and known by the name of Antonio Lambardo or Francisco Antonio Pigafetta. He joined the Portuguese, Captain Ferdinand Magellan and his Spanish crew on their trip to Maluku Island. Pigafetta has the most complete account of Magellan expedition entitled Primo viaggio intorno al mondo (First Voyage around the world). He was one of the eighteen survivors who returned to Spain aboard the "Victoria" and therefore considered as an eyewitness of the significant events happened on the first mass of which Magellan names it the Islands of Saint Lazarus that is later called the Philippine Archipelago. Pigafetta narrated on his account the events happened from March 16, 1521, when they first saw the Island of the Philippine group up to April 7, 1521, when the expedition landed on Cebu. On March 16, 1521, there was a "high land" named "Zamal" that was sighted by the Magellan's expedition which was some 300 leagues westward of the Ladrones Island. On March 17, 1521, they landed on "uninhabited island" or known as "Humunu" (Homonhon) which Pigafetta referred to as "Watering place of good signs" because the place is abundant in gold. Humunu lays right of Zamal at 10 degrees north latitude. They stayed there 8 days from March 17 to 25, 1521. On March 25, 1521, they left the island of Homonhon and change route towards west southwest, between four islands: namely, Cenalo, Hiunanghan, Ibusson, and Albarien. Afterwards, they sail westward towards Leyte, then followed the Leyte coast southward passing between the island of Ibusson on their port side and Hinunangan Bay on their starboard, and then continued southward, the returning westward to Mazaua. On March 28, 1521, there is an island lies on a latitude of 9 and 2/3 towards the arctic pole and in a longitude 100 and 62 degrees from the line of demarcation. It is named as Mazaua which is 25 leagues from the Acquada. On April 4, 1521, they left Mazaua bound for Cebu and guided by their King who sailed on his own boat. All throughout their route, it took them past five island namely: Ceylon, Bohol, Canighan, Baibai, and Gatighan. They sailed from Mazaua west by northwest into the Canigao channel, with Bohol island to port and Leyte and Canigao islands to starboard. Then they continue sailing northwards along the Leyte coast, past Baibai to Gatighan (it was 20 leagues from Mazaua and 15 leagues from Subu or Cebu. At Gatighan, they sailed westward to the three island of the Camotes group namely: Poro, Pasihan, and Ponson. From the Camotes Island they sailed southwestward towards "Zubu". On April 7 they entered the harbor of "Zubu" (Cebu). It takes them three days to negotiate the journey from Mazaua northwards to the Camotes Islands and then southwards to Cebu. That was the route of Magellan expedition as stated in the account of Pigafetta. In that route, the southernmost point reached before getting to Cebu was Mazaua, located at nine and two-thirds degrees North latitude.

=== Blood compact ===
The island's sovereign ruler was Rajah Kolambu. When Magellan and comrades set foot on the grounds of Mazaua, he befriended the Rajah together with his brother Rajah Siagu of Butuan. In those days, it was customary among the indigenous—and in most of southeast Asia—to seal friendship with a blood compact. On instigation of Magellan who had heard the Malayan term for it, casi casi, the new friends performed the ritual. This was the first recorded blood compact between Filipinos and Spaniards. Gifts were exchanged by the two parties when the celebration had ended.

=== First Mass ===
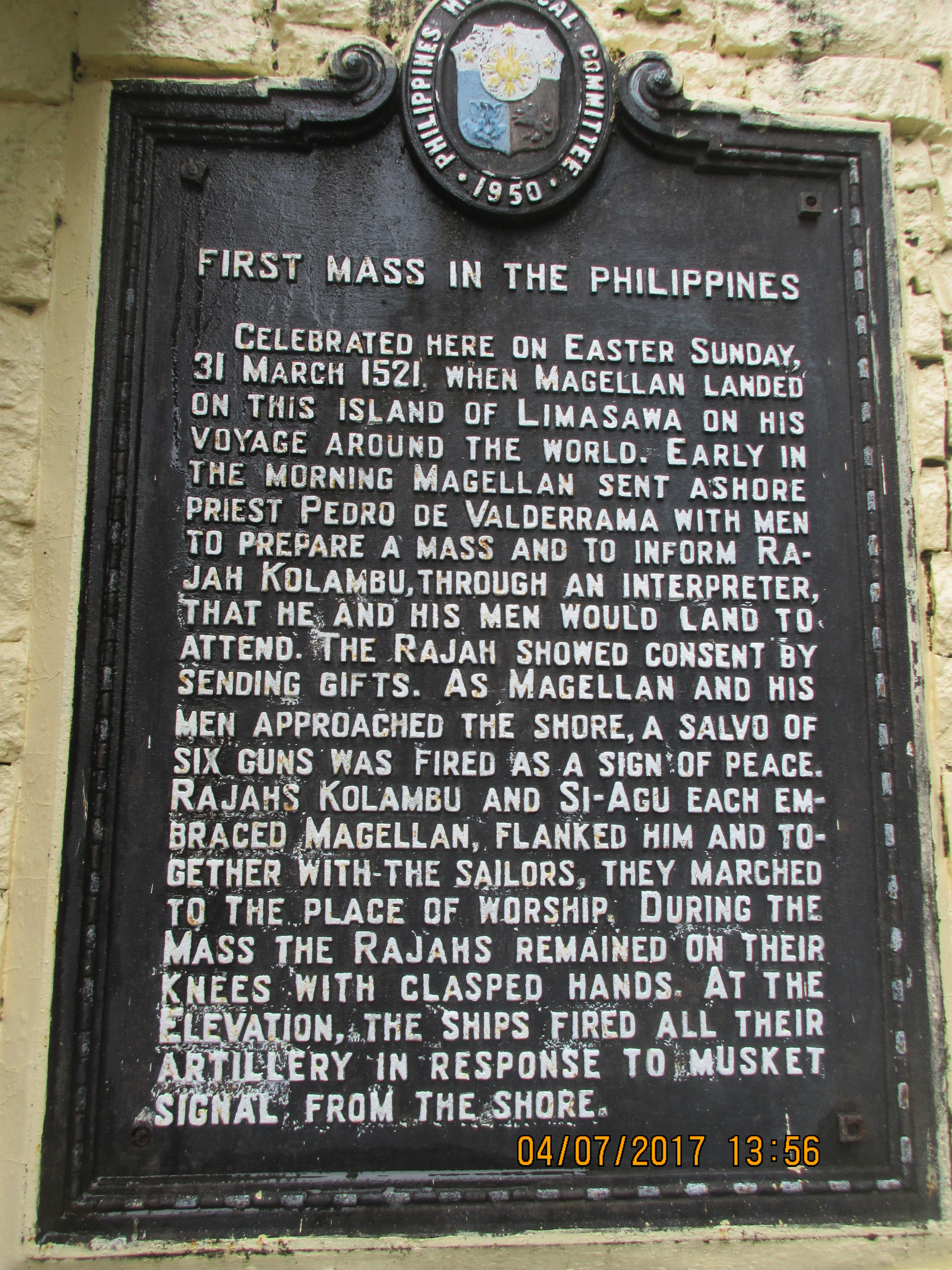
Replica of the marker unveiled in Limasawa on March 31, 1951

On March 31, 1521, an Easter Sunday, Magellan ordered a Mass to be celebrated which was officiated by Father Pedro Valderrama, the Andalusian chaplain of the fleet, the only priest then. Conducted near the shores of the island, the First Holy Mass marked the birth of Christianity in the Philippines. Colambu and Siaiu were the first natives of the archipelago, which was not yet named "Philippines" until the expedition of Ruy Lopez de Villalobos in 1543, to attend the Mass among other native inhabitants.

In the account of Pigafetta, Gomez noticed that he failed to mention some points of the journey where the masses were held, one example is when they were at the port of San Julian. Pigafetta mentioned about a mass held on Palm Sunday, April 1, 1520, during their voyage to the west but never mentioned about Easter Sunday. Same situation happened when the fleet arrived in the Philippines, Pigafetta only mentioned about the Easter Sunday Mass while he is silent on the Palm Sunday.

For further investigation, some points at Pigafetta's account was translated as follows:

At dawn on Saturday, March 16, 1521, (feast of St. Lazarus, Gomez inserted) we came upon a highland at a distance... an island named Zamal (Samar)... the following day (March 17, Sunday) the captain general desired to land on another island (Humunu) ...uninhabited... in order to be more secure and to get water and have some rest. He had two tents set up on shore for the sick. On Monday, March 18, we saw a boat coming towards us with nine men in it. This marks our first human contact with Europeans... giving signs of joy because of our arrival. At noon on Friday, March 22, those men came as they had promised. And we lay eight days in that place, where the captain every day visited the sick men who he had put ashore on the island to recover.

— Antonio Pigafetta

As observed by Gomez, the instance wherein Pigafetta had written about the mass said it had two things in common; they are both held in the shores and there are Filipino natives present. Another passing evidence, a document found concerning the landing of Magellan's fleet in Suluan ''(Homonhon)'' and the treaty with the natives featured in a blog post in 2004. It first came out in an article published in 1934 in Philippine Magazine featured by Percy Gil, and once again featured by Bambi Harper in her column at the Philippine Daily Inquirer back in 2004.

=== Planting of the cross ===
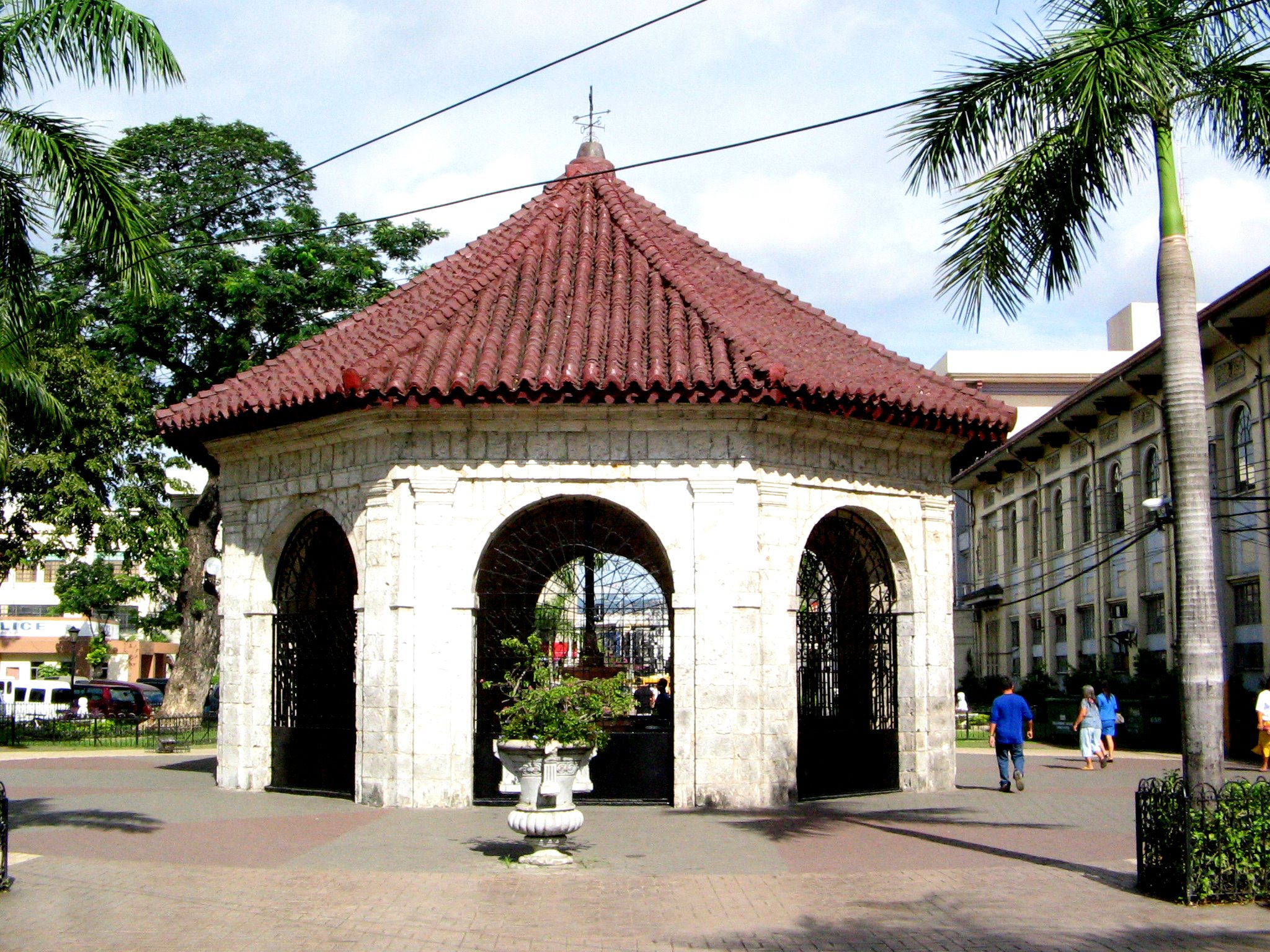
Building purportedly containing the Magellan's Cross

In the afternoon of the same day, Magellan instructed his comrades to plant a large wooden cross on the top of the hill overlooking the sea. Magellan's chronicler, Antonio Pigafetta, who recorded the event said: "After the cross was erected in position, each of us repeated a Pater Noster and an Ave Maria, and adored the cross; and the kings [Colambu and Siaiu] did the same."

Magellan then took ownership of the islands where he had landed in the name of King Charles V which he had named earlier on March 16 Archipelago of Saint Lazarus because it was the day of the saint when the Armada reached the archipelago.

In the Account of Francisco Albo, he did not mention about the first mass in the Philippines but only the planting of the cross upon a mountain top from which could be seen three islands to the west and southwest, where they were told there was much gold. This also fits the southern end of Limasawa. It does not suits the coast of Butuan from which no islands could be seen to the south or the southwest, but only towards the north.

== Proclamation of the national shrine ==
On June 19, 1960, Republic Act No. 2733, known as the "Limasawa Law", was enacted without executive approval on June 19, 1960. The legislative fiat declared "The site in Magallanes, Limasawa Island in the Province of Leyte, where the first Mass in the Philippines was held is hereby declared a national shrine to commemorate the birth of Christianity in the Philippines." Magallanes is east of the island of Limasawa. In 1984 Imelda Marcos had a multi-million pesos Shrine of the First Holy Mass built, an edifice made of steel, bricks and polished concrete, and erected on top of a hill overlooking barangay Magallanes, Limasawa. A super typhoon completely wiped this out just a few months later. Another shrine was inaugurated in 2005.

Limasawa celebrates the historic and religious coming of the Spaniards every March 31 with a cultural presentation and anniversary program dubbed as Sinugdan, meaning "beginning".

== Historical controversies ==
One contention is that the historical accuracy regarding the country's first Catholic mass celebration is not only to be settled based on location but also on when it exactly occurred. The Mojares Panel addressed the debate by specifying that the historical occasion that occurred in Limasawa Island be known as the First Easter Sunday Mass, thereby distinguishing it from prior masses that were conducted by the Spaniards onboard their ships sailing through the sea surrounding Samar and the earlier mass supposedly held in Bolinao, Pangasinan, in 1324.

=== Bolinao ===
Odoric of Pordenone, an Italian and Franciscan friar and missionary explorer, is heartily believed by many Pangasinenses to have celebrated the first mass in Pangasinan in around 1324 that would have predated the mass held in 1521 by Ferdinand Magellan. A marker in front of Bolinao Church states that the first Mass on Philippine soil was celebrated in Bolinao Bay in 1324 by a Franciscan missionary, Blessed Odorico.

However, there is scholarly doubt that Odoric was ever at the Philippines. Ultimately, the National Historical Institute led by its chair Ambeth Ocampo recognized the historical records of Limasawa in Southern Leyte as the venue of the first Mass, held on March 31, 1521.

=== Homonhon ===
A position paper submitted by the chancellor of the Diocese of Borongan to the NHCP stated that the Magellan expedition reached the shores of Homonhon on March 16, 1521, and remained for eight days, which coincided two Sundays and the Holy Week. The paper's assertion claimed that by deducing from the timing of their arrival and the liturgical calendar in use in 1521, there were no less than four masses, including the Palm Sunday mass on their last day on the island, held in Homonhon before the expedition made their voyage to Limasawa Island. Historians, however, remained in disagreement whether the such religious celebrations, which were said to have been held as thanksgiving for the expedition's safe passage or to observe the beginning of Holy Week, did occur.

=== Masao ===
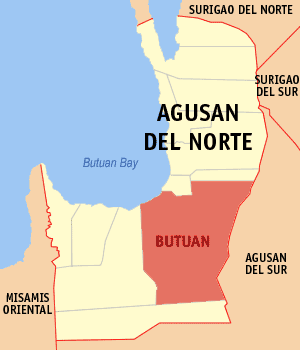
Location of Butuan in the province of Agusan del Norte

Some Filipino historians have long contested the idea that Limasawa was the site of the first Catholic mass in the country. Historian Sonia Zaide identified Masao (also Mazaua) in Butuan as the location of the first Christian mass. The basis of Zaide's claim is the diary of Antonio Pigafetta, chronicler of Magellan's voyage. In 1995, Agusan del Norte's 1st congressional district Representative Ching Plaza filed a bill in Congress contesting the Limasawa hypothesis and asserting that the "site of the first mass" was in Butuan. The Congress of the Philippines referred the matter to the National Historical Institute for it to study the issue and recommend a historical finding. NHI chairman Dr. Samuel K. Tan reaffirmed Limasawa as the site of the first mass.

It was until at least the 19th century that the prevailing belief among historians was that the first mass was held in Butuan.

=== Confusion on meeting the king of Butuan ===
According to Bernad (2002), the confusion originated from 17th-century historians such as Colin and Combes, often yielding incorrect representation of Magellan's voyage, which ultimately led to the misconception of the first mass being held at Butuan, rather than Limasawa. The writings of the previous historians failed to depict the correct route of Magellan's ships toward the Philippines. Some write-ups accounted for the entrance of the ships from the southern part of the country whereas the account of Antonio Pigafetta revealed the entrance from the eastern part of the country, from the direction of the Pacific region.

== Government position ==
The National Historical Institute (NHI) first took action on the Limasawa–Butuan controversy in 1980 followed by the creation of two more panels in 1995 and 2008. The government has consistently concluded Limasawa as the site of the first Easter Sunday Mass in the country. Another panel led by prominent historian Resil B. Mojares was formed in 2018 by now National Historical Commission of the Philippines (NHCP) to further review continued claims in favor of Butuan. The pro-Butuan group presented non-eyewitness accounts decades after the Mass as their proofs. Meanwhile, the pro-Limasawa group provided the panel coordinates of Mazaua given by the eyewitnesses, studies and projects that retraced the Magellan–Elcano expedition using modern navigational instruments, and the copies of Pigafetta's original accounts.

Ahead of the quincentennial celebration of the Christianization of the Philippines, the NHCP dismissed the Butuan claim due to insufficient evidences to change the government's current position and reaffirmed Limasawa as the site of the first Easter Sunday Mass in the country. The panel also endorsed the changes proposed by historian Rolando Borrinaga to recognize Triana instead of Magallanes as the specific site of the mass in Limasawa and Saub Point in Triana as the site of the cross planted by the Magellan expedition.

Potenciano R. Malvar, the chair of the Butuan Calagan Historical Cultural Foundation and proponent of the Butuan claim, filed a lawsuit in response to the panel's conclusions alleging libel and falsification against the Mojares Panel and Borrinaga on March 18, 2021. The legal move was characterized by Philippine Daily Inquirer columnist John Nery as "dangerous nonsense" and a means to "weaponize the law against historical truth."
