= Antsi language =

Austronesian language spoken in the Philippines

Antsi
- Mag-antsi
- Native to: Philippines
- Region: Zambales, Tarlac, Mabalacat, Angeles City
- Native speakers: 4,200 (2005)
- Language family: Austronesian: Malayo-Polynesian; Philippine; Central Luzon; Sambalic; Antsi

Language codes
- ISO 639-3: sgb
- Glottolog: maga1263

The Antsi (Anchi) language or Mag-antsi (also Mag-Anchi Ayta) is a Sambalic language with around 4,200 speakers. It is spoken within Philippine Aeta communities in the Zambal municipalities of Botolan, San Marcelino, and Castillejos; in the Tarlaqueño municipalities of Capas and Bamban; in Mabalacat, Pampanga; and in Angeles City. The use of the language is declining as its speakers are shifting to Kapampangan or Ilocano. The language is mutually intelligible with Mag-Indi Ayta (77%) and Ambala Ayta (65%).

== Phonology ==
Consonants
		Labial	Alveolar	Palatal	Velar	Glottal
Plosive	voiceless	p	t	c	k	ʔ
Plosive	voiced	b	d		ɡ	
Nasal		m	n		ŋ	
Fricative			s			h
Lateral			l			
Rhotic			ɾ			
Approximant		w		j		

Vowels
	Front	Central	Back
Close	i	ɨ	u
Mid	e		o
Open		a	

== Grammar ==
Ayta Mag-antsi Case Markers
		Nominative	Genitive	Oblique
Common		ya, a (Note: "Ya" is reflected as "a" after words ending in consonants.), -y (Note: "Ya" is suffixed as "-y" after words ending in vowels.), ∅ (Note: "Ya" and "hên" are reflected as null if marking a fronted noun.)	hên, -n (Note: "Hên" is suffixed as "-n" after words ending in vowels. However, it is reflected as "hên" after words ending in vowels in slow careful speech.), ∅	ha
Personal	singular	hi	ni	kan
Personal	plural	hilan	lan	kallan

== See also ==
- Languages of the Philippines
