= Abellen language =

Austronesian language spoken in the Philippines

Abellen
- Ayta Abellen
- Native to: Philippines
- Region: Tarlac and Botolan
- Native speakers: 4,450 (2020)
- Language family: Austronesian: Malayo-Polynesian; Philippine; Central Luzon; Sambalic; Abellen

Language codes
- ISO 639-3: abp
- Glottolog: aben1249
- ELP: Abellen Ayta

Abellen, Abenlen, Aburlin, or Ayta Abellen, is a Sambalic language. It has about 4,400 speakers and is spoken in a few Aeta communities in Tarlac province, Philippines. Ayta Abellen itself is part of the Sambalic language family in the Philippines and is closely related to not only the five other Ayta dialects but also the Botolan dialect of Sambal. Ethnologue reports 45 monolinguists.

== Geographic distribution ==
Abellen Ayta speakers can be found in the following locations:

- Maamot, San Jose, Tarlac Province
- Santa Juliana, Mayantoc, Tarlac Province
- Capas, Tarlac Province
- Sitio Loob-Bunga, Barangay Poon Bato, Botolan, Zambales

== History ==
=== Early history ===
The Ayta Abellen people are historically a semi-nomadic people. Also known as Negritos, they are said to be descendants of the earliest inhabitants of the Philippines, dating back to the late Pleistocene Era. The Ayta Abellen are distinguishable by their curly black hair, and darker skin tone as compared to other Filipinos. Since their language is similar to other Austronesian languages, there is a theory of an Austronesian migration that occurred. In this theory, there were two different migrations, one from the southern coast of Sundaland eastward and from Wallacea to Mindanao, causing there to be a separation of Ayta people and the Mamanwa for about 20,000 to 30,000 years. Prior to the Austronesian migration, there was not much similarity between the original languages of the Negritos.

=== Modern history and revitalization ===
After the eruption of Mt. Pinatubo in the 1990s, some of the Ayta Abellen have relocated from the mountains and have intermarried and mixed in with the local Ilocano people. As a result, there are Ilocano loan words in the language. Much of the population also speaks Ilocano as a second language along with Tagalog as well. The Ayta people rely on natural resources; however, due to shrinking forests, it has become harder to sustain that life style. This problem, along with diseases and remoteness from modern health care centers, is correlated with the higher death rate as compared to the birth rate among the Ayta Abellen people.

== Phonology ==
Consonants
		Labial	Alveolar	Palatal	Velar	Glottal
Nasal		m	n		ŋ	
Plosive	voiceless	p	t		k	ʔ
Plosive	voiced	b	d		ɡ	
Fricative						h
Lateral			l			
Semivowel		w		j		

Vowels
	Front	Back
Close	i	o
Open	a	ə

Phonemes	Orthographic symbols
/p/	P
/b/	B
/t/	T
/d/	D
/k/	K
/g/	G
/ʔ/	-
/h/	H
/m/	M
/n/	N
/ŋ/	Ng
/l/	L
/w/	W
/j/	Y
/i/	I
/a/	A
/a/	Ā
/«/	E
/o/	O

Additionally, s, r, c (for [k]), j, among other phonemes, are used in loanwords and names. In the Sambal and Ayta languages, the glottal stop tends to replace a word final non-obstruent when proceeded by a stressed high central vowel.

== Grammar ==
Ayta Abellen shares the same verb–subject–object sentence structure as other languages in the Philippines. It shares similar phonology with other Ayta dialects as well as Botolan Sambal. Not only does it share an identical pronoun system with other Sambalic languages, but between other Ayta languages, it is around 70% similar. This language is a CV (consonant and vowel) and CVC language, although sometimes it is ambiguously a VC and V language. In this language, vowel deletion as well as consonant deletion are evident when words are combined. In this language, placement of stress can be unpredictable. Poly-syllabic words have primary stress whereas words with more than three syllables contain a secondary stress. However, suffixation also causes a shift in stress placement.

== Writing system ==
Ayta Abellen is written using Latin text. Ilocano is a second language to much of the Abellen and the lingua franca of where many of the Abellen people reside, while Tagalog is the national language of the Philippines. Transcribers are trying to document the language in text that is similar to both Ilocano and Tagalog. Many of the hymnals used in the area are written in Botolan Sambal, and thus they are also trying to have Ayta Abellen orthography conform to it as well.

== See also ==
- Aeta people
- Ilocano people
- Languages of the Philippines
- Central Luzon languages
