= Sambal language =

Austronesian language spoken in the Philippines

Sambal
- Sambali
- Native to: Philippines
- Region: Zambales, Pangasinan, Metro Manila, Palawan
- Ethnicity: Sambal
- Native speakers: (70,000 cited 2000)
- Language family: Austronesian: Malayo-Polynesian; Philippine; Central Luzon; Sambalic; Sambal

Official status
- Recognised minority language in: Philippines (as a regional language)
- Regulated by: Komisyon sa Wikang Filipino

Language codes
- ISO 639-3: xsb
- Glottolog: tina1248
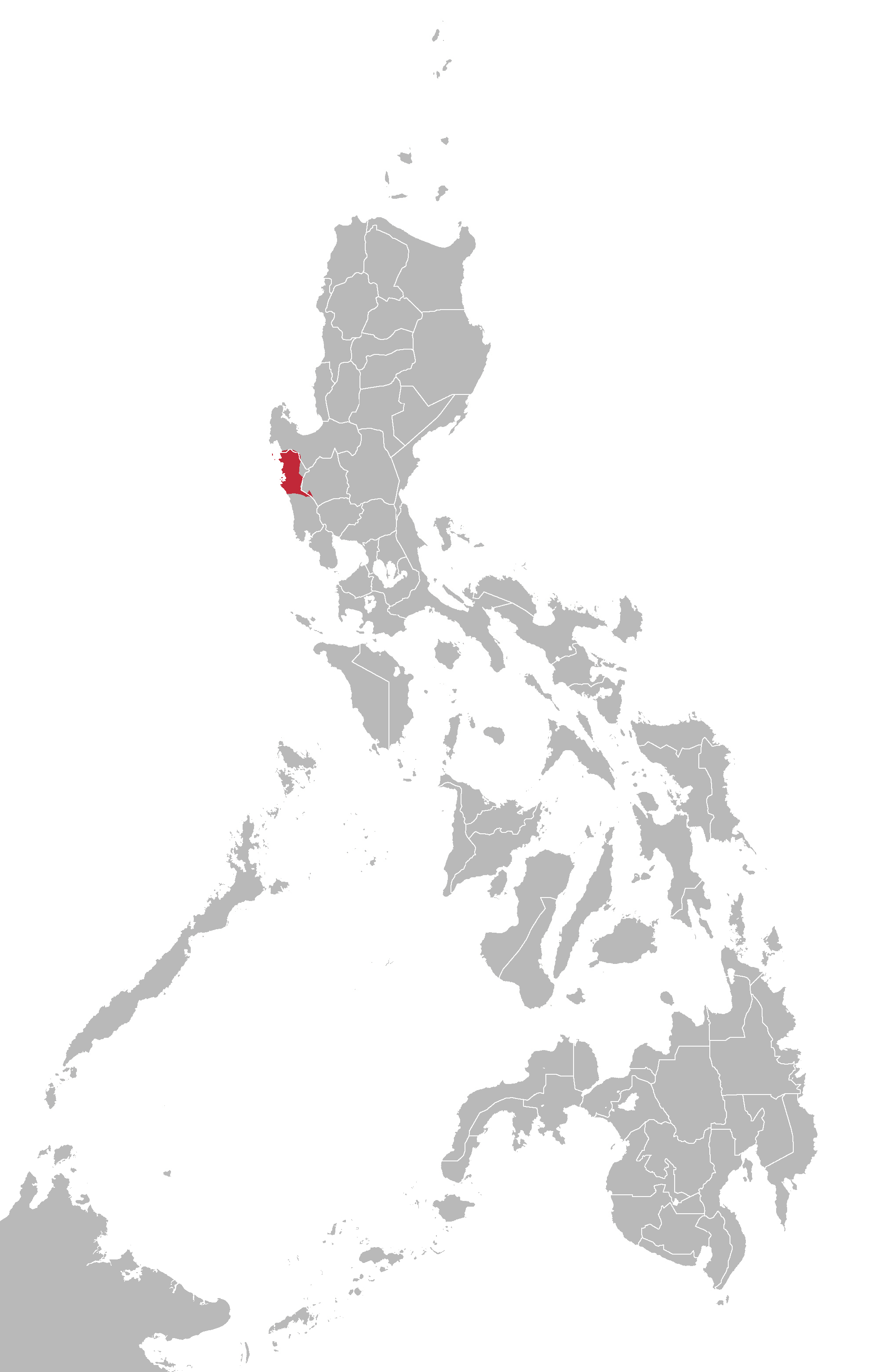
- Area where Sambal is spoken

Sambal (Note: Also known as Sambali, Sambal Tina, or Tina Sambal.) is a Sambalic language spoken primarily in the Zambal municipalities of Santa Cruz, Candelaria, Masinloc, Palauig, and Iba, in the Pangasinense municipality of Infanta, and areas of Pampanga in the boundary with Zambales in the Philippines; speakers can also be found in Panitian, Quezon, Palawan and Barangay Mandaragat or Buncag of Puerto Princesa. The speakers of the language are decreasing due to the fact that many of the speakers are shifting to Tagalog and Ilocano.

== Dialects ==
Ethnologue reports Santa Cruz, Masinloc and Iba as dialects of the language.

== Name ==
The language is occasionally referred to as Zambal, which is the hispanized form of Sambal.

Sambal had also for a time been referred to as Tina, a term still encountered in older sources. The term, however, which means 'bleached' in the Botolan variety of the language, is considered offensive. The pejorative term was first used in the late 1970s by researchers from the Summer Institute of Linguistics (now SIL International). Sambals would not normally recognize the reference.

== External relationships ==
Sambal language is most closely related to Kapampangan and to Remontado Dumagat. This has been interpreted to mean that Sambal speakers had once inhabited that area, later being displaced by migrating Tagalog settlers, pushing the original inhabitants northward to the modern province of Zambales, in turn, displacing the Aetas. In Zambales, Sambal speakers were almost displaced by Tagalog settlers once again who migrated along with Ilocano settlers to repopulate the less-populated Zambales valley, leading to the assimilation of Sambals to the Tagalog and Ilocano settlers and to the modern decline of Sambal cultural identity and language. There is also a possible relationship between the Sambal speakers and the population of the island provinces of Marinduque and Romblon based on commonalities in some traditions and practices.

== Phonology ==
Sambali has 19 phonemes: 16 consonants and three vowels. Syllable structure is relatively simple.

=== Vowels ===
Sambali has three vowels. They are:

- /a/ an open front unrounded vowel similar to English 'father'
- /i/ a close front unrounded vowel similar to English 'machine'
- /u/ (written as ‘o’) a close back unrounded vowel similar to English 'flute'

There are five main diphthongs: /aɪ/, /uɪ/, /aʊ/, /ij/, and /iʊ/.

=== Consonants ===
Below is a chart of Sambal consonants. All the stops are unaspirated. The velar nasal occurs in all positions including at the beginning of a word.

Sambal consonants
		Bilabial	Dental	Palatal	Velar	Glottal
Stops	Voiceless	p	t		k	(-) [ʔ]
Stops	Voiced	b	d		g	
Affricates	Voiceless			(ts) [tʃ]		
Affricates	Voiced					
Fricatives			s			h
Nasals		m	n		ng [ŋ]	
Laterals			l			
Flaps			ɾ			
Semivowels		w		y [j]		

Note: Consonants [d] and [ɾ] sometimes interchange, as they were once allophones. Dy is pronounced [dʒ], ny [ɲ], sy [ʃ], and ty [tʃ].

=== Stress ===
Stress is phonemic in Sambal. Word stress is very important; it differentiates homonyms, e.g. hikó ('I') and híko ('elbow').

=== Historical sound changes ===
Many words pronounced with /s/ and /ɡ/ in Cebuano and Tagalog are pronounced with /h/ and /j/, respectively, in their cognates in Sambal. Compare hiko and ba-yo with the Tagalog siko and bago.

== Grammar ==
=== Zambal pronouns ===
==== Common singular pronouns ====
- ang, 'yung (iyong) – yay hikon-mong, ya-rin hikon-moy
- ng, n'ung (niyong) – nin kon-moyo
- Sa – ha
- Nasa – Ison ha ('near'), Itaw ha ('far')

==== Common plural pronouns ====
- ang mgá, 'yung mgá (iyong mgá) – yay + first letter of plural word + aw
- (e.g. yay bawbabayi – ang mga babae; yay lawlalaki – ang mga lalaki)
- ng mgá, n'ung mgá (niyong mgá) – nin yay + first letter of plural word + aw
- (e.g. nin bawbabayi – ng mga babae, nin lawlalaki – ng mga lalaki)
- sa mgá – ha first letter of plural word + aw (e.g. habawbabayi – sa mga babae, halawlalaki – sa mga ki)
- Nasa mga – Iti, ison, itaw + pronoun

==== Personal singular pronouns ====
- Si – hi
- Ni – Ni
- Kay – Kun ni
- Na kay – hikun

==== Personal plural ====
- Sina – Hila
- Nina – ni
- Kina – Kun li
- Nakina – Hikunla

Note: In a general conversation, hi is usually omitted or contracted from the pronoun: e.g. Hikunla tana hiya rin (sa kanila na lang iyan) is simply ‘kunla tana ‘ya-rin or even shorter, as ‘kunlay na rin.

Example:

'The man arrived.' Dumating ang lalaki:

1. Nakalato hiyay lalaki or nakalato ‘yay lalaki or ‘yay tawo.
2. Linu-mato hiyay lalaki; or
3. Lin’mato ‘yay lalaki or ‘yay tawo.
- Yay (referring to object)
- Hiyay (singular person)
- Hikamon (plural second person)
- Hilay (plural third person)

Nakita ni Juan si Maria – Na-kit ni Juan hi Maria. 'John saw Mary.'

Note that in Philippine languages, even the names of people require an article.

==== Plural nominal article ====
'Helen and Robert will go to Miguel's house.'

- Pupunta sina Elena at Roberto sa bahay ni Miguel.
- Maku hila Elena tan Roberto ha bali ni Miguel.
- Pupunta ako – maku-ko
- Papunta – ma-mako
- Punta – mako
- Pumupunta – ampako
- Pupuntahan – ampaku-tawan\makuku-son

'Father has the keys.'

- Nasaan ang mga aklat?
- Ayti yay lawlibro?
- Na kay Tatay ang mga susi.
- Hikun ni Tatay yay sawsusi or ‘Kunni Tatay yay sawsusi

'That baby is healthy.'

- Malusog ang sanggol.
- Maganda yay lalaman nya-nin makating/makalog.

==== Pronouns ====
Personal pronouns are categorized by case. The indirect forms also function as the genitive.

		Singular	Dual	Plural
1st person	Exclusive	ako – hiko ko – ko akin – hikunko (shortened to ‘kunko)	kita – ta, kunta	kami – hikami or ‘kami namin – mi amin – hikunmi or ‘kunmi
1st person	Inclusive	ako – hiko ko – ko akin – hikunko (shortened to ‘kunko)	kita – ta, kunta	tayo – hitamo or ‘tamo natin – hikuntamo or ‘kuntamo atin – hikuntamo or ‘kuntamo
2nd person		ikáw – hika mo – mo iyó – hikunmo or ‘kunmo	kayo – hikamo or ‘kamo ninyo – moyo inyo – hikunmoyo or ‘kunmoyo	
3rd person		siya – hiya niya – naya kaniya – hikunnaya or ‘kunnaya	silá – hila nilá – la kanilá – hikunla or ‘kunla	

Examples:

'I wrote.'

Sulat is hulat (Masinloc) or sulat (Sta. Cruz)
Sumulat ako. Humulat ko or Sumulat ko.

Sinulatan ako ng liham. Hinulatan nya hiko or hinulatan nya’ ko.
'He/She wrote me a letter.' Hinomulat ya ‘kunko, nanulat ya kunko, or hinulatan mya ko.

Ibibigay ko sa kaniyá. Ebi ko ‘kunna (hikuna).
'I will give it to him/her.'

Genitive pronouns follow the word they modify. Oblique pronouns can take the place of the genitive pronoun but they precede the word they modify.

Ang bahay ko. Yay bali ko.
Ang aking bahay. Yay ‘kunkon bali.
'My house.'

=== Interrogative words ===
Sambal	Tagalog	English
Ayri/Ayti	Saan	Where
Anya	Ano	What
Anta/Ongkot	Bakit	Why
Hino	Sino	Who
Nakano	Kailan	When

== Sample texts ==
=== Philippine national proverb ===
Below is a translation in Sambal of the Philippine national proverb "He who does not acknowledge his beginnings will not reach his destination," followed by the original in Tagalog.

- Sambal: Hay kay tanda mamanomtom ha pinangibatan, kay maka-lato ha ampako-taw-an.
- Tagalog: Ang hindi marunong lumingon sa pinanggalingan ay hindi makararating sa paroroonan.

=== The Lord's Prayer ===
==== Version from Matthew ====
Ama mi an ison ha langit,
sambawon a ngalan mo.
Ma-kit mi na komon a pa-mag-ari mo.
Ma-honol komon a kalabayan mo iti ha lota
a bilang anamaot ison ha langit.
Biyan mo kami komon nin
pa-mangan mi para konan yadtin awlo;
tan patawaron mo kami komon ha kawkasalanan mi
a bilang anamaot ha pa-matawad mi
konlan ampagkasalanan komi.
Tan komon ando mo aboloyan a matokso kami,
nokay masbali ipa-lilih mo kamin kay makagawa doka,
ta ikon moy kaarian, kapangyarian tan karangalan a homin
panganggawan. Amen.

==== Version from Luke ====
Ama mi, maipatnag komon a banal mon kapangyarian.
Lomato ana komon an awlon sikay mag-ari.
Biyan mo kamin pa-mangan mi sa inawlo-awlo.
Inga-rowan mo kami sa kawkasalanan mi bilang
pa-nginganga-ro mi konlan nagkasalanan komi
tan ando mo kami aboloyan manabo sa tokso.
Wamoyo.

== Examples ==
=== Numbers ===
Sambal numbers are listed below.

Sambal numbers
Sambal	English
A`sa	One
Luwa	Two
Tulo	Three
A`pat	Four
Lima	Five
A`num	Six
Pito	Seven
Walo	Eight
Siyam	Nine
Mapulo	Ten
Hanyato	One hundred

=== Common expressions ===
Sambal	Tagalog	English
Kay ko tanda / Tanda ko	Hindi ko alam / Alam ko	I don't know / I know
Papo	Lola/lolo	Grandparent
Kaka	Ate/kuya/pinsan	Sibling or cousin
Akay ko labay / Labay ko	Hindi ko gusto / Gusto ko	I don't like / I like
Murong tamoy na	Uwi/balik na tayo	Let's go home/back
Hadilap	Bukas	Tomorrow
Hawanin	Ngayon	Now/today
Naapon	Kahapon	Yesterday
Ya	Oo	Yes
Ka`i	Hindi	No
Mikaka-awlo	Buong araw	Whole day
Mangan tamoy na	Kumain na tayo	Let’s eat
Mabati kay na	Maiwan ka na	Stay there
Hagyatin	Tawagin	Call
Hay amot	Ang init	It’s hot
Liglig-dalan	Tabi ng daan	Side of the road
Liglig-ambay	Tabi ng dagat	Coastline
Ya naur	Kaya nga/Oo nga	About right
Ibayle	Isayaw/Sumayaw	Dance
Mangapon	Maghapunan	Eat supper
Hay tiboy	Ang tigas	It’s hard
Hay duna	Ang tigas	It’s chewy
Ili yay nan ili	Tawa siya ng tawa	He/she is laughing to much
Mapagal koy na	Pagod na ako	I am tired
Mikakalok koy na	Matutulog na ako	I am going to sleep

== See also ==
- Sambal people
- Zambales
- Languages of the Philippines
