= Bataan dialect =

Bataan dialect may refer to:

- The Tagalog language dialect spoken in Bataan
- The Kapampangan language dialect spoken in Bataan
- The Mariveleño language
