= Mariveleño dialect =

The Mariveleño dialect may refer to:

- The dialect of Tagalog spoken in Mariveles in the Philippines
- The Mariveleño language
