= Mariveleño =

Mariveleño may refer to:

- Mariveles, Bataan
- Mariveleño language
