= Central Luzon languages =

Subgroup of the Austronesian language family

Central Luzon
- Geographic distribution: Western parts of Central Luzon near Mount Pinatubo, western Bulacan, southwest Nueva Ecija, the whole Pampanga province, and west Pangasinan; northeast Calabarzon
- Linguistic classification: Austronesian: Malayo-Polynesian; Philippine; Central Luzon
- Proto-language: Proto-Central Luzon
- Subdivisions: Kapampangan; Sambalic; Sinauna

Language codes
- Glottolog: cent2080
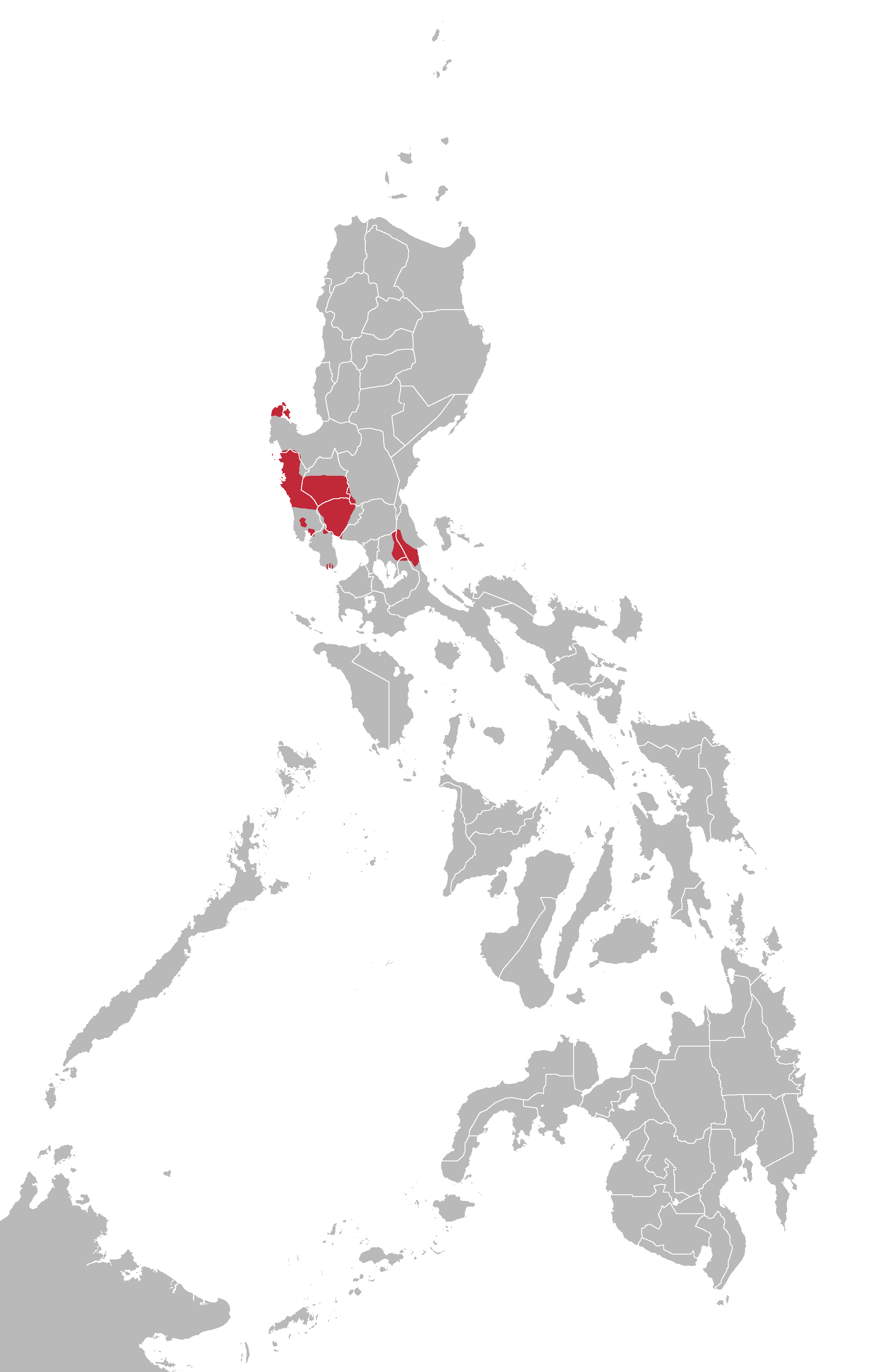
- Geographic extent of Central Luzon languages based on Ethnologue

The Central Luzon languages are a group of languages belonging to the Philippine languages. These are predominantly spoken in the western portions of the political administrative region of Central Luzon (Region III) in the Philippines. One of them, Kapampangan, is the major language of the Pampanga-Mount Pinatubo area.

However, despite having three to four million speakers, it is threatened by the diaspora of its speakers after the June 1991 eruption of that volcano. Globalization also threatened the language, with the younger generation more on using and speaking Tagalog and English, but promotion and everyday usage boosted the vitality of Kapampangan.

Another Central Luzon language, Sambal or Sambali, experiences same situation, the speakers of the language are decreasing due to the globalization that many of the speakers of younger generation are shifting to Tagalog & Ilocano. Central Luzon languages spoken outside the political region of Central Luzon are Sambal Bolinao, the variety/varieties of Sambal spoken in southwestern Pangasinan province, and Hatang Kayi (erroneously called Sinauna or Sinaunang Tagalog in the literature) in northeast Calabarzon; Pangasinan was formerly part of political region of Central Luzon, and is still geographically, while Sambali is spoken in Infanta, Pangasinan along the boundary with Zambales.

== Historical linguistics ==
The modern Central Luzon languages descended from the hypothetical Proto-Central Luzon language.

=== Phonology of Proto-Central Luzon ===
Some consonants were lost in Proto-Central Luzon when it evolved from either Proto-Malayo-Polynesian or Proto-Philippine.

Consonants of Proto-Central Luzon
	Labial	Alveolar	Palatal	Velar	Glottal
Nasal	m /m/	n /n/		ŋ /ŋ/	
Stop	p /p/, b /b/	t /t/, d /d/	j /ɡʲ/	k /k/, g /g/	ʔ /ʔ/
Affricate			z /ɟ͡ʝ/		
Fricative		s /s/			
Lateral		l /l/			
Rhotic		r /ɾ/			
Semivowel	w /w/		y /j/		

The phonetic values of the consonants above are the ones assumed for Proto-Austronesian except for the glottal stop /ʔ/, which resulted from sound changes into Proto-Central Luzon: *q > *ʔ and *h > Ø followed by Ø > *ʔ/#_.

Vowels of Proto-Central Luzon
Height	Front	Central	Back
Close	i /i/		u /u/
Mid		e /ə/	
Open		a /a/	

The values of the vowels above are the ones they had in Proto-Malayo Polynesian.

=== External relationships ===
Ronald Himes (2012) and Lawrence Reid (2015) suggest that the Northern Mindoro languages may group with the Central Luzon languages. Both branches share the phonological reflex Proto-Austronesian *R > /y/.

=== Internal classification ===
- Central Luzon
  - Hatang Kayi
  - Kapampangan
  - Sambalic
    - Abellen
    - Ambala
    - Bolinao
    - Botolan
    - Mag-antsi
    - Mag-indi
    - Mariveleño
    - Sambali
