= Sambalic languages =

Central Luzon language subgroup

Sambalic
- Geographic distribution: Zambales, Bolinao, Anda, Infanta, Olongapo
- Ethnicity: Sambal
- Linguistic classification: Austronesian: Malayo-Polynesian; Philippine; Central Luzon; Sambalic
- Proto-language: Proto-Sambalic
- Subdivisions: Abellen; Ambala; Bolinao; Botolan; Antsi (Mag-Antsi); Indi (Mag-Indi); Mariveleño; Sambali

Language codes
- Glottolog: samb1319

The Sambalic languages are a part of the Central Luzon language family spoken by the Sambals, an ethnolinguistic group on the western coastal areas of Central Luzon and the Zambales mountain ranges.

== Demographics ==
The largest Sambalic languages are Sambal, Bolinao, and Botolan with approximately 200,000, 105,000 and 72,000 speakers, respectively, based on the 2007 population statistics from the National Statistical Coordination Board (NSCB). These figures are the combined population of the municipalities where the language is spoken.

For the Sambali or Sambal ethnolinguistic subgrouping, the estimated number of speakers is based on the total population of Santa Cruz, Candelaria, Masinloc, Palauig, and Iba municipalities of Zambales. For the Sambal Bolinao subgrouping, a projected number of speakers is taken from the combined populations of Anda and Bolinao municipalities of Pangasinan. The Sambal Botolan subgroup, on the other hand, takes the aggregated population of Botolan and Cabangan municipalities. The rest are smaller languages spoken almost exclusively within various Aeta communities. In total, there are approximately 390,000 speakers of Sambalic languages. Speakers can also be found in other towns of Zambales not mentioned above: Olongapo City, Bataan, Tarlac, and Metro Manila.

An estimated 6000 speakers can also be found in Panitian, Quezon, Palawan and Puerto Princesa City, and smaller ones in Mindanao, mainly in urban areas like Davao City, General Santos and Cagayan de Oro, and regions like Soccsksargen and Northern Mindanao. The language is also spoken by many Filipino immigrants in the U.S. and Canada. In Dartmouth, Nova Scotia, Canada, for instance, the language is spoken by a clan of Zambals. In Casino Nova Scotia in the Maritimes city of Halifax, a group of Sambals can be found running the card games. Community organizations of Sambal-speaking Filipino-Americans are found in San Diego and San Francisco, California as well as in Hawaii.

== Internal classification ==
Roger Stone (2008) classifies the Sambalic languages as follows.

- Ayta Abellen, Botolan Sambal
- Tina Sambal, Bolinao
- Ayta Mag-indi, Ayta Mag-antsi
- Ayta Ambala

Ayta Magbukun was not included in Stone's (2008) classification.

== External relationships ==
The Sambalic languages, being part of the Central Luzon languages subgroup, are most closely related to Kapampangan and to Remontado Dumagat spoken in the highlands of Tanay in the province of Rizal. The NCCA hypothesizes that this means Sambali speakers whom had once inhabited that area, after being displaced by migrating Tagalog people, were pushed northward to what is now the province of Zambales, in turn, displacing the Aetas. In Zambales, Sambal speakers were almost displaced by Tagalog settlers once again who migrated along with Ilocano settlers to repopulate the less-populated Zambales valley, leading to the assimilation of Sambals to the Tagalog and Ilocano settlers and to the modern decline of Sambal cultural identity & language.

== Speakers ==
Sambal (Spanish: Zambal) is the common collective name for all Sambalic-language speakers. It is also the term referring to the Sambalic language subgrouping in northern municipalities of Zambales, which comprises the majority of Sambals or more than 50 percent (200,000) of all Sambalic languages speakers (390,000). Sambal may also refer to the inhabitants of Zambales as a whole and the residents of Bolinao and Anda in Pangasinan.

Sambalic Languages
Language	Speakers
Sambal	200,000
Bolinao	105,000
Botolan	72,000
Indi	5,000
Antsi	4,200
Abellen	3,500
Ambala	2,000
Mariveleño	500

== Sample text ==
Below are translations in Bolinao, Botolan, and Sambal of the Philippine national proverb "A person who does not look back at where they came from will not get to their destination.", along with the original in Tagalog.

Language	Translation
Tagalog	Ang hindi marunong lumingon sa pinanggalingan ay hindi makararating sa paroroonan.
English	A person who does not look back at where they came from will not get to their destination.
Bolinao	Si [tawon] kai magtanda’ lumingap sa ibwatan [na], kai ya mirate’ sa keen [na].
Botolan	Hay ahe nin nanlek ha pinag-ibatan, ay ahe makarateng ha lalakwen.
Sambal	Hiyay kay tandâ mamanomtom ha pinag-ibatan, kay ya makâlatô ha ampakôtawan.

== See also ==
- Languages of the Philippines
- Sambal people
