= Botolan language =

Austronesian language spoken in the Philippines

Botolan
- Botolan Sambal
- Native to: Philippines
- Region: some parts of Zambales province, Luzon
- Native speakers: (33,000 cited 2000)
- Language family: Austronesian: Malayo-Polynesian; Philippine; Central Luzon; Sambalic; Botolan

Official status
- Regulated by: Komisyon sa Wikang Filipino

Language codes
- ISO 639-3: sbl
- Glottolog: boto1242
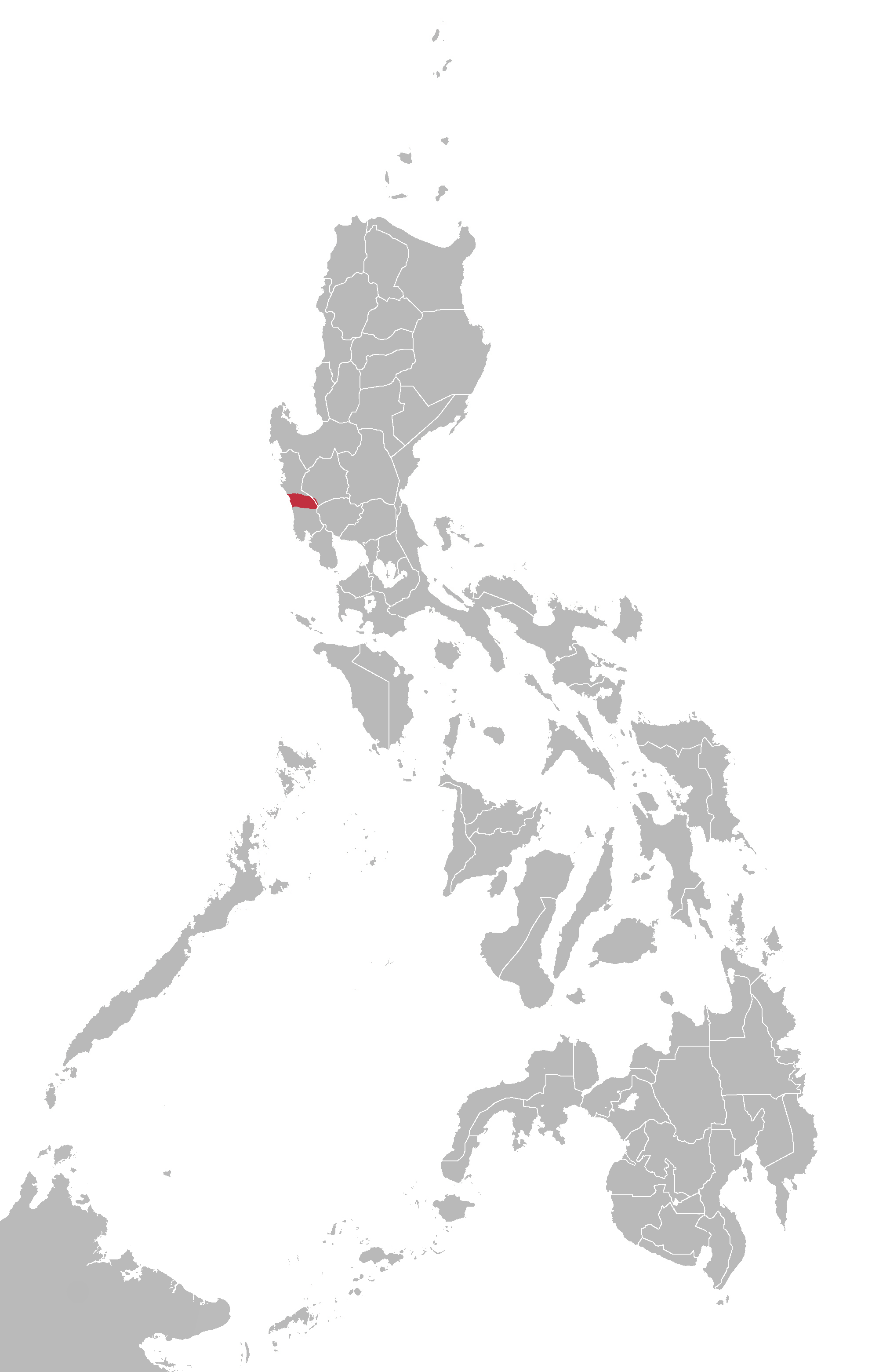
- Area where Botolan Sambal is spoken according to Ethnologue

Botolan is a Sambalic language spoken by 32,867 (SIL 2000) Sambal, primarily in the Zambal municipalities of Botolan and Cabangan in the Philippines. Language status is 5 (developing).

== Varieties ==
The Ayta people of sitio Villar, Botolan, and sitio Kakilingan, Santa Fe, Cabangan also speak a Botolan dialect with some unique lexical items.

Ethnologue reports Ayta Hambali (Hambali Botolan), Sambali Botolan as dialects of Sambal Botolan. Among themselves, Ayta Hambali reportedly use some words that are similar to Ayta, Mag-Anchi.

== Phonology ==
Botolan has 20 phonemes: 16 consonants and four vowels. Syllable structure is relatively simple. Each syllable contains at least a consonant and a vowel.

=== Vowels ===
Botolan has four vowels. They are:

- /a/ an open central unrounded vowel similar to English father
- /e/ a close-mid front unrounded vowel similar to German Elefant
- /i/ a close front unrounded vowel similar to English machine
- /u/ (written as 'o') a close back unrounded vowel similar to English flute

There are five main diphthongs: /aɪ/, /uɪ/, /aʊ/, /ij/, and /iʊ/.

=== Consonants ===
Below is a chart of Botolan consonants. All the stops are unaspirated. The velar nasal occurs in all positions including at the beginning of a word.

		Bilabial	Dental	Palatal	Velar	Glottal
Nasals		m	n	ɲ ⟨ny⟩	ŋ ⟨ng⟩	
Plosives/ Affricates	voiceless	p	t	tʃ ⟨ts, ty⟩	k	ʔ -
Plosives/ Affricates	voiced	b	d	dʒ ⟨dy⟩	g	
Fricatives			s	ʃ ⟨sy⟩		h
Laterals			l	lj ⟨ly⟩		
Flaps			r			
Semivowels		w		j		

Note: Consonants /d/ and /ɾ/ can sometimes interchange as they were once allophones.

=== Stress ===
Stress is phonemic in Botolan. Word stress is very important; it differentiates homonyms, e.g. hikó ('I') and híko ('elbow').

=== Historical sound changes ===
Many words pronounced with /s/ and /ɡ/ in Tagalog have /h/ and /j/, respectively, in their cognates in Botolan. Compare hiko and bayo with the Tagalog siko and bago.

== Sample texts ==
=== The Lord's Prayer ===
==== Version from Matthew ====
Tatay nawen ya anti ha katatag-ayan,
Hay ngalan mo ay igalang dayi nin kaganawan.
Andawaten nawen ya tampol kayna dayin mag-arí.
Mangyari dayi ya kalabayan mo bayri ha babon lotá
Bilang ombayro ha katatag-ayan.
Hapa-eg ay biyan mo kayin pamamangan ya
angka-ilanganen nawen.
Patawaren mo kayi ha kawkasalanan
nawen bilang pamatawad nawen ha nakapagkasalanan konnawen.
Agmo kayi biyan ma-irap ya pagsobok boy
ipakarayó mo kayi koni Satanas.

=== Philippine national proverb ===
Below is a translation in Botolan of the Philippine national proverb "He who does not acknowledge his beginnings will not reach his destination," followed by the original in Tagalog.

- Botolan: Hay ahe tanda nin nanlek ha pinangibatan, ay ahe makalateng ha lalakwen.
- Tagalog: Ang hindi marunong lumingon sa pinanggalingan ay hindi makararating sa paroroonan.

== See also ==
- Languages of the Philippines
