= Indi language =

Austronesian language spoken in the Philippines

Indi
- Ayta, Indi, Indi Ayta, Mag-Indi Sambal
- Mag-indi
- Native to: Philippines
- Region: Floridablanca, Porac, San Marcelino
- Ethnicity: 30,000 (no date)
- Native speakers: (5,000 cited 1998)
- Language family: Austronesian: Malayo-Polynesian; Philippine; Central Luzon; Sambalic; Indi

Language codes
- ISO 639-3: blx
- Glottolog: magi1241

The Indi language or Mag-indi (or Mag-Indi Ayta) is a Sambalic language with around 5,000 speakers. It is spoken within Philippine Aeta communities in San Marcelino, Zambales, and in the Pampango municipalities of Floridablanca (including in Nabuklod) and Porac. There are also speakers in Lumibao and Maague-ague.

== Phonology ==
=== Consonants ===
		Labial	Alveolar	Palatal	Velar	Glottal
Plosive	voiceless	p	t		k	ʔ
Plosive	voiced	b	d		ɡ	
Nasal		m	n		ŋ	
Fricative			s			
Lateral			l			
Rhotic			ɾ			
Approximant		w		j		

=== Vowels ===
	Front	Central	Back
Close	i	ɨ	u
Open		a	

== See also ==
- Languages of the Philippines
