= Kapampangan language =

Austronesian language spoken in the Philippines

Kapampangan
- Pampangan; Capampáñgan
- Amánung Kapangpángan, Amánung Sísuan
- Kapangpángan written in Kulitan, the language's indigenous writing system
- Pronunciation: [kəːpəmˈpaːŋən]
- Native to: Philippines
- Region: Central Luzon (entirety of Pampanga, southern Tarlac, northeastern Bataan, western Bulacan, southwestern Nueva Ecija, southeastern parts of Zambales)
- Ethnicity: Kapampangan
- Native speakers: 2.8 million (2010); 7th most spoken native language in the Philippines
- Language family: Austronesian: Malayo-Polynesian; Philippine; Central Luzon; Kapampangan
- Writing system: Latin (Kapampangan alphabet); Kulitan

Official status
- Official language in: Angeles City
- Recognised minority language in: Regional language of the Philippines
- Regulated by: Komisyon sa Wikang Filipino

Language codes
- ISO 639-2: pam
- ISO 639-3: pam
- Glottolog: pamp1243
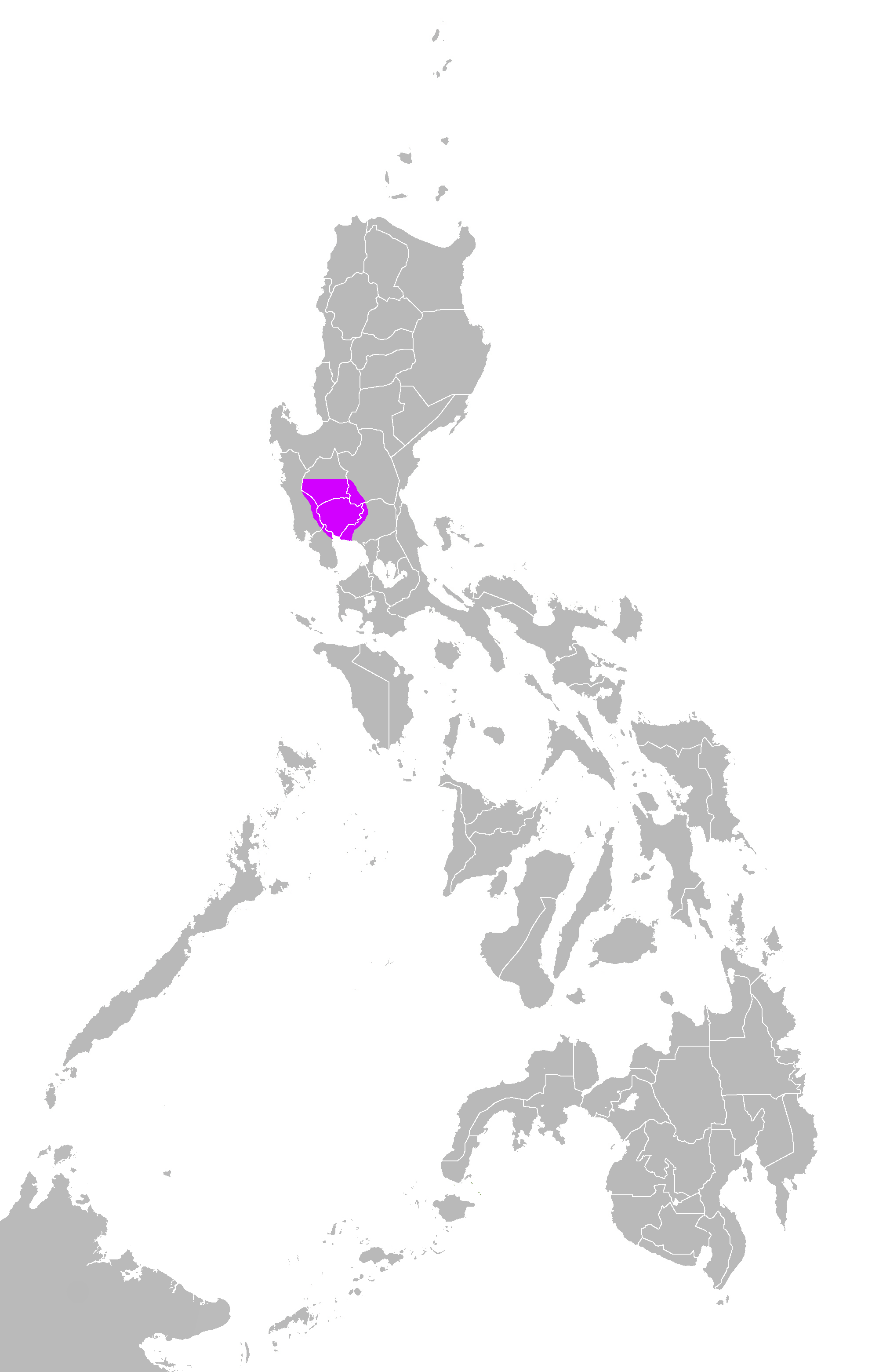
- Areas where Kapampangan is spoken in the Philippines

Kapampangan, Capampáñgan, or Pampangan, is an Austronesian language, and one of the eight major languages of the Philippines. It is the primary and predominant language of the entire province of Pampanga and southern Tarlac, on the southern part of Luzon's central plains geographic region, where the Kapampangan ethnic group resides. Kapampangan is also spoken in northeastern Bataan, as well as in the provinces of Bulacan, Nueva Ecija, and Zambales that border Pampanga. It is further spoken as a second language by a few Aeta groups in the southern part of Central Luzon. The language is known honorifically as Amánung Sísuan ('breastfed, or nurtured, language').

Kapampangan is assigned the ISO 639-2 three-letter code pam, but not an ISO 639-1 two-letter code.

== Classification ==
Kapampangan is one of the Central Luzon languages of the Austronesian language family. Its closest relatives are the Sambalic languages of Zambales province and the Bolinao language spoken in the towns of Bolinao and Anda in Pangasinan. These languages share the same reflex /j/ of the proto-Malayo-Polynesian *R.

== History ==
Kapampangan is derived from the root word pampáng ('riverbank'). The language was historically spoken in the Kingdom of Tondo, ruled by the Lakans.

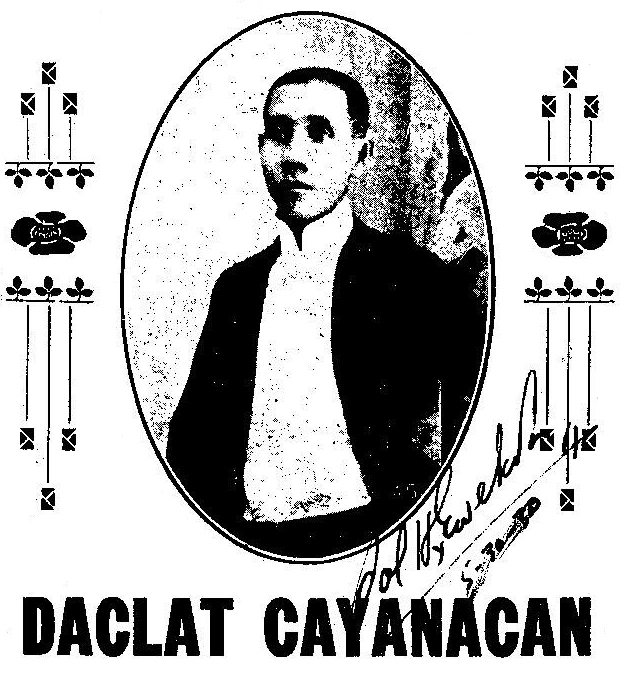
Title page of Daclat Cayanacan, a poetic work in Kapampangan written by Aurelio Tolentino, posthumously published in 1921

A number of Kapampangan dictionaries and grammar books were written during the Spanish colonial period. Diego Bergaño wrote two 18th-century books about the language: Arte de la lengua Pampanga (first published in 1729) and Vocabulario de la lengua Pampanga (first published in 1732). Kapampangan produced two 19th-century literary giants; Anselmo Fajardo was noted for Gonzalo de Córdova and Comedia Heróica de la Conquista de Granada, and playwright Juan Crisóstomo Soto wrote Alang Dios in 1901. "Crissotan" was written by Amado Yuzon, Soto's 1950s contemporary and Nobel Prize nominee for peace and literature, to immortalize his contribution to Kapampangan literature.

Aurelio Tolentino is also considered a pioneer of writing literature in the Kapampangan language, alongside Juan Crisostomo Soto, during the late Spanish and American rule. Tolentino, having been in and out of prison between 1896 to 1907 due to him being a Katipunero and political writings, is remembered as one of the first nationalist dramatist of the Philippines. Some of his significant works include his Ing Buac Ning Ester, a novel published in three parts published from 1911 to 1915, and his Napun, Ngeni at Bukas. These works were later translated to Tagalog.

== Geographic distribution ==
Kapampangan is predominantly spoken in the province of Pampanga and southern Tarlac (Bamban, Capas, Concepcion, San Jose, Gerona, La Paz, Victoria and Tarlac City). It is also spoken in border communities of the provinces of Bataan (Dinalupihan, Hermosa and Orani), Bulacan (Baliuag, San Miguel, San Rafael, San Ildefonso, Hagonoy, Plaridel, Pulilan and Calumpit), Nueva Ecija (Cabiao, San Antonio, San Isidro, Gapan and Cabanatuan) and Zambales (Olongapo City and Subic).

The language has also speakers outside Central Luzon, particularly in nearby Metro Manila and as far as Palawan and Mindanao. In Mindanao, a significant Kapampangan-speaking minority also exists in Cagayan de Oro, Davao City, South Cotabato (specifically in General Santos and the municipalities of Polomolok and Tupi) and Sultan Kudarat (specifically in Isulan). Other areas outside Central Luzon w/ Kapampangan speakers are Ilocos Region and Cagayan Valley, with largest concentrations in Pangasinan, Cagayan, and Isabela.

According to the 2000 Philippine census, 2,312,870 people (out of the total population of 76,332,470) spoke Kapampangan as their native language. As of 2020, the language is ranked to be the eighth leading language spoken at home in the Philippines with only 639,687 households still speaking the language.

== Phonology ==
Standard Kapampangan has 20 phonemes: 15 consonants and five vowels; some western dialects have six vowels. Syllabic structure is relatively simple; each syllable contains at least one consonant and a vowel.

=== Vowels ===
Standard Kapampangan has five vowel phonemes:

- /ə/, a close back unrounded vowel when unstressed; allophonic with /aː/, an open front unrounded vowel similar to English father when stressed
- /ɛ/, an open-mid front unrounded vowel similar to English bed
- /i/, a close front unrounded vowel similar to English machine
- /o/, a close-mid back rounded vowel similar to English forty
- /u/, a close back rounded vowel similar to English flute

There are four main diphthongs: /aɪ/, /oɪ/, /aʊ/, and /iʊ/. In most dialects (including standard Kapampangan), /aɪ/ and /aʊ/ are reduced to /ɛ/ and /o/ respectively.

Monophthongs have allophones in unstressed and syllable-final positions:

- /a/ becomes [ə] in all unstressed positions.
- Unstressed /i u/ is usually pronounced [ɪ ʊ], as in English bit and book respectively (except final syllables).
- In final syllables /i/ can be pronounced [ɛ, i], and /u/ can be pronounced [o, u].
  - deni/reni ('these') can be pronounced [ˈdɛnɛ]/[ˈɾɛnɛ] or [ˈdɛni]/[ˈɾɛni]; seli ('bought') can be pronounced [ˈsɛlɛ] or [ˈsɛli]; kekami ('to us' [except you]) can be pronounced [kɛkəˈmɛ] or [kɛkəˈmi]; suerti can be pronounced [ˈswɛɾtɛ] or [ˈswɛɾti], sisilim ('dusk') can be pronounced [sɪˈsilɛm] or [sɪˈsilim].
  - kanu ('he said, she said, they said, it was said, allegedly, reportedly, supposedly') can be pronounced [kaˈno] or [kaˈnu]; libru ('book') can be pronounced [libˈɾo] or [libˈɾu]; ninu ('who') can be pronounced [ˈnino] or [ˈninu]; kaku ('to me') can be pronounced [ˈkako] or [ˈkaku], and kámaru ('cricket') can be pronounced [ˈkaːməɾu] or [ˈkaːməɾo].
- Unstressed /e, o/ are usually pronounced [ɪ, ʊ], respectively (except final syllables).

=== Consonants ===
In the chart of Kapampangan consonants, all stops are unaspirated. The velar nasal occurs in all positions, including the beginning of a word. Unlike other languages of the Philippines but similar to Ilocano, Kapampangan uses /h/ only in words of foreign origin.

		Bilabial	Dental / Alveolar	Palatal	Velar	Glottal
Nasal		m	n		ŋ	
Stop	voiceless	p	t	tʃ	k	ʔ
Stop	voiced	b	d	dʒ	g	
Fricative			s	ʃ		
Tap/Trill			ɾ ~ r			
Approximant			l	j	w	

- /k/ tends to lenite to [x] between vowels.
- [d] and [ɾ] are allophones in Kapampangan, and sometimes interchangeable; Nukarin la ring libru? can be Nukarin la ding libru? ('Where are the books?').
- A glottal stop at the end of a word is often omitted in the middle of a sentence and, unlike in most languages of the Philippines, is conspicuously absent word-internally; hence, Batiáuan's dropping of semivowels from its very name. The vowel it follows is then lengthened.

=== Stress ===
Stress is phonemic in Kapampangan. Primary stress occurs on the last or the next-to-last syllable of a word. Vowel lengthening accompanies primary or secondary stress, except when stress occurs at the end of a word. Stress shift can occur, shifting to the right or left to differentiate between nominal or verbal use (as in the following examples):

- dápat ('should, ought to') → dapát ('deed, concern, business')
- dapúg ('gather, burn trash') → dápug ('trash pile')

Stress shift can also occur when one word is derived from another through affixation; again, stress can shift to the right or the left:

- ábe → abáyan ('company')
- láso → lasáwan ('melt, digest')

=== Sound changes ===
In Kapampangan, the proto-Philippine schwa vowel *ə merged to /a/ in most dialects of Kapampangan; it is preserved in some western dialects. Proto-Philippine *tanəm is tanam ('to plant') in Kapampangan, compared with Tagalog tanim, Cebuano tanom and Ilocano tanem ('grave').

Proto-Philippine *R merged with /j/. The Kapampangan word for 'new' is bayu; it is bago in Tagalog, baro in Ilocano, and baru in Indonesian.

== Grammar ==
Kapampangan is a VSO or Verb-Subject-Object language. However, the word order can be very flexible and change to VOS (Verb-Object-Subject) and SVO (Subject-Verb-Object). Just like other Austronesian languages, Kapampangan is also an agglutinative language where new words are formed by adding affixes onto a root word (affixation) and the repetition of words, or portions of words (reduplication), (for example: anak ('child') to ának-ának ('children')). Root words are frequently derived from other words by means of prefixes, infixes, suffixes and circumfixes. (For example: kan ('food') to kanan ('to eat') to 'kakanan ('eating') to kakananan ('being eaten')).

Kapampangan can form long words through extensive use of affixes, for example: Mikakapapagbabalabalangingiananangananan, 'a group of people having their noses bleed at the same time', Mikakapapagsisiluguranan, 'everyone loves each other', Makapagkapampangan, 'can speak Kapampangan', and Mengapangaibuganan, 'until to fall in love'. Long words frequently occur in normal Kapampangan.

=== Nouns ===
Kapampangan nouns are not inflected, but are usually preceded by case markers. There are three types of case markers: absolutive (nominative), ergative (genitive), and oblique.

Unlike English and Spanish (which are nominative–accusative languages) and Inuit and Basque (which are ergative–absolutive languages), Kapampangan has Austronesian alignment (in common with most Philippine languages). Austronesian alignment may work with nominative (and absolutive) or ergative (and absolutive) markers and pronouns.

Absolutive or nominative markers mark the actor of an intransitive verb and the object of a transitive verb. Ergative or genitive markers mark the object (usually indefinite) of an intransitive verb and the actor of a transitive one. It also marks possession. Oblique markers, similar to prepositions in English, mark (for example) location and direction. Noun markers are divided into two classes: names of people (personal) and everything else (common).

Case markers
	Absolutive	Ergative	Oblique
Common singular	ing	-ng, ning	king
Common plural	ding, ring	ring	karing
Personal singular	i(y)	-ng	kang
Personal plural	di, ri	ri	kari

Examples:

- Dintang ya ing lalaki. ('The man arrived.')
- Ikit neng Juan i(y) Maria. ('Juan saw Maria.')
- Munta ya i(y) Elena ampo i(y) Robertu king bale nang Miguel. ('Elena and Roberto will go to Miguel's house.')
- Nukarin la ring libro? ('Where are the books?')
- Ibiye ke ing susi kang Carmen. ('I will give the key to Carmen.')

=== Pronouns ===
Kapampangan pronouns are categorized by case: absolutive, ergative, and oblique.

	Absolutive (independent)	Absolutive (enclitic)	Ergative	Oblique
1st person singular	yaku, i(y) aku, aku	ku	ku	kanaku, kaku
1st person dual	ikata	kata, ta	ta	kekata
1st person plural inclusive	ikatamu, itamu	katamu, tamu	tamu, ta	kekatamu, kekata
1st person plural exclusive	ikami, ike	kami, ke	mi	kekami, keke
2nd person singular	ika	ka	mu	keka
2nd person plural	ikayu, iko	kayu, ko	yu	kekayu, keko
3rd person singular	iya, ya	ya	na	keya, kaya
3rd person plural	ila	la	da, ra	karela

==== Examples ====
- Sinulat ku. ('I wrote.')
- Silatanan ke. ('I wrote to him.')
- Silatanan na ku ('He [or she] wrote me.')
- Dintang ya ('He [or she] has arrived.') Note: Dintang ya 'He arrived (or arrives)'; Dintang ne 'He has arrived.'
- Sabian me kaku ('Tell it to me.')
- Ninu ia ing minaus keka? ('Who called you?')
- Mamasa la ('They are reading.')
- Mamangan la ring babi? ('They eat pigs too?')

Genitive pronouns follow the word they modify. Oblique pronouns can replace the genitive pronoun, but precede the word they modify.

- Ing bale ku; Ing kakung bale; Ing kanakung bale ('my house')

The dual pronoun ikata and the inclusive pronoun ikatamu refer to the first and second person. The exclusive pronoun ikamí refers to the first and third persons.

- Ala katang nasi. ('We [dual] do not have rice.')
- Ala tamung nasi. ('We [inclusive] do not have rice.')
- Ala keng nasi., Ala kaming nasi. ('We [exclusive] do not have rice.')

Kapampangan differs from many Philippine languages in requiring the pronoun even if the noun it represents, or the grammatical antecedent, is present.

- Dintang ya i(y) Erning (not dintang i(y) Erning; 'Ernie arrived').
- Mamasa la ri Maria at Juan (not mamasa ri Maria at Juan; 'Maria and Juan are reading').
- Silatanan na kang José (not silatanan kang José; 'José wrote you').

==== Special forms ====
The pronouns ya and la have special forms when they are used in conjunction with the words ati ('there is/are') and ala ('there is/are not').

- Ati yu king Pampanga ('He is in Pampanga').
- Ala lu ring doktor keni, Ala lu ding doktor keni ('The doctors are no longer here').

Both ati yu and ati ya are correct. The plural form ('they are') is atilu and atila. Both ala la and ala lu are correct in the plural form. The singular forms are ala ya and ala yu.

==== Pronoun combinations ====
Kapampangan pronouns follow a certain order after verbs (or particles, such as negation words). The enclitic pronoun is always followed by another pronoun (or discourse marker:

- Ikit da ka ('I saw you').
- Silatanan na ku ('He wrote to me').

Pronouns also combine to form a portmanteau pronoun:

- Ikit ke ('I saw her').
- Dinan kong kwalta ('I will give them money').

Portmanteau pronouns are not usually used in questions and with the word naman:

- Akakit me? ('Do you see him?')
- Buri nya naman yan, buri ne murin yan ('He likes that, too').

In the following chart, blank entries denote combinations which are deemed impossible. Column headings denote pronouns in the absolutive case, and the row headings denote the ergative case.

Pronoun order and forms
	yaku (1 sing.)	ika (2 sing.)	ya (3 sing.)	ikata (1 dual)	ikatamu (1 incl.)	ikami (1 exclusive)	ikayo (2 plural)	ila (3 plural)
ku (1 sing)	(ing sarili ku)	da ka ra ka	ke keya	–	–	–	da ko (ra ko) da kayu (ra kayu)	ko ku la
mu (2 sing)	mu ku	(ing sarili mu)	me mya	–	–	mu ke mu kami	–	mo mu la
na (3 sing)	na ku	na ka	ne nya (ing sarili na)	na kata	na katamu	na ke na kami	na ko na kayu	no nu la
ta (1 dual)	–	–	te tya	(ing sarili ta)	–	–	–	to ta la
tamu (1p inc)	–	–	ta ya	–	(ing sarili tamu)	–	–	ta la
mi (1p exc)	–	da ka ra ka	mi ya	–	–	(ing sarili mi)	da ko (ra ko) da kayu (ra kayu)	mi la
yu (2 p)	yu ku	–	ye ya	–	–	yu ke yu kami	(ing sarili yu)	yo yu la
da (3 p)	da ku ra ku	da ka ra ka	de (re) dya	da kata ra kata	da katamu ra katamu	da ke (ra ke) da kami (ra kami)	da ko (ra ko) da kayu (ra kayu)	do (ro) da la (ra la) (ing sarili da)

=== Demonstrative pronouns ===
Kapampangan's demonstrative pronouns differ from other Philippine languages by having separate forms for singular and plural.

Demonstrative pronouns
	Absolutive		Ergative		Oblique		Locative		Existential
	Singular	Plural	Singular	Plural	Singular	Plural	Singular	Plural	Existential
Nearest to speaker (this, here)	ini	deni, reni	nini	dareni	kanini	kareni	oini	oreni	keni
Near speaker & addressee (this, here)	iti	deti, reti	niti	dareti	kaniti	kareti	oiti	oreti	keti
Nearest addressee (that, there)	iyan	den, ren	nian	daren	kanian	karen	oian	oren	ken
Remote (yon, yonder)	ita	deta, reta	nita	dareta	kanita	kareta	oita	oreta	keta

The demonstrative pronouns ini and iti (and their respective forms) both mean 'this', but each has distinct uses. Iti usually refers to something abstract, but may also refer to concrete nouns: iting musika ('this music'), iti ing gagawan mi ('this is what we do'). Ini is always concrete: ining libru ('this book'), ini ing asu nang Juan ('this is Juan's dog').

In their locative forms, keni is used when the person spoken to is not near the subject spoken of; keti is used when the person spoken to is near the subject spoken of. Two people in the same country will refer to their country as keti, but will refer to their respective towns as keni; both mean 'here'.

The plural forms of a demonstrative pronoun and its existential form (for the nearest addressee) are exceptions. The plural of iyan is den/ren; the plural of niyan is daren; the plural of kanyan is karen, and the plural of oian is oren. The existential form of ian is ken.

- Nanu ini? ('What's this?')
- Mangabanglu la rening sampaga, Mangabanglu la dening sampaga ('These flowers smell nice').
- Ninu ia ing lalaking ita? ('Who is that man?')
- Me keni, Ume ka keni ('Come here').
- Ati ku keti, ati yu ku keni, atyu ku keni ('I am here').
- Mangan la keta ('They will eat there').
- Ninu ia ing anak a ian? ('Who is that child?')
- Oita ya pala ing salamin mu! ('So that's where your glasses are!')
- E ku pa menakit makanian/makanini ('I haven't seen one of these before').
- Maniaman la ren/Maniaman la den ('Those are delicious').
- Aini/Areni/Oreni la reng adwang regalo para keka ('Here are the two gifts for you').
- Buri daka! ('I like you!')
- Kaluguran daka! ('I love you!')
- Mangan Tana! ('Let's eat!')
- Edaka buring mawala! ('I don't want to lose you!')

=== Verbs ===
Kapampangan verbs are morphologically complex, and take a variety of affixes reflecting focus, aspect and mode. The language has Austronesian alignment, and the verbs change according to triggers in the sentence (better known as voices). Kapampangan has five voices: agent, patient, goal, locative, and cirumstantial. The circumstantial voice prefix is used for instrument and benefactee subjects.

The direct case morphemes in Kapampangan are ing (which marks singular subjects) and reng, for plural subjects. Non-subject agents are marked with the ergative-case ning; non-subject patients are marked with the accusative-case -ng, which is cliticized onto the preceding word.

S‹um›ulat yang poesia ing lalaki gamit pen king papil.
{} ya=ng {} {} {} {} {} {} {}
‹AT›will.write 3SG.DIR=ACC poem DIR boy OBL pen OBL paper
"The boy will write a poem with a pen on the paper."

I-sulat ne ning lalaki ing poesia king mestra.
{} na+ya {} {} {} {} {} {}
PT-will.write 3SG.ERG+3SG.DIR ERG boy DIR poem OBL teacher.F
"The boy will write the poem to the teacher"
or "The poem will be written by the boy to the teacher."

Sulat-anan ne ning lalaki ing mestro.
{} na+ya {} {} {} {}
will.write-GT 3SG.ERG+3SG.DIR ERG boy DIR teacher.M
"The boy will write to the teacher"
or "The teacher will be written to by the boy."

Pi-sulat-an neng poesia ning lalaki ing blackboard.
{} na+ya=ng {} {} {} {} {}
LT-will.write-LT 3SG.ERG+3SG.DIR=ACC poem ERG boy DIR blackboard
"The boy will write a poem on the blackboard"
or "The blackboard will be written a poem on by the boy."

Panyulat neng poesia ning lalaki ing pen.
paN-sulat na+ya=ng {} {} {} {} {}
CT-will.write 3SG.ERG+3SG.DIR=ACC poem ERG boy DIR pen
"The boy will write a poem with the pen"
or "The pen will be written a poem with by the boy."

Pamasa nong libru ning babai reng anak.
paN-basa na+la=ng {} {} {} {} {}
CT-will.read 3SG.ERG+3PL.DIR=ACC book ERG woman PL.DIR child
"The woman will read a book for the children"
or "The children will be read a book by the woman."

==== Ambiguities and irregularities ====
Speakers of other Philippine languages find Kapampangan verbs difficult because some verbs belong to unpredictable verb classes and some verb forms are ambiguous. The root word sulat ('write') exists in Tagalog and Kapampangan:

- Susulat means 'is writing' in Kapampangan and 'will write' in Tagalog.
- Sumulat means 'will write' in Kapampangan and 'wrote' in Tagalog. It is the infinitive in both languages.
- Sinulat means 'wrote' in both languages. In Kapampangan, it is in the actor focus (with long i: [ˌsi:ˈnu:lat]) or object focus (with short i: [siˈnu:lat]), and object focus only in Tagalog.

The object-focus suffix -an represents two focuses; the only difference is that one conjugation preserves -an in the completed aspect, and it is dropped in the other conjugation:

- Bayaran ('to pay someone'): bayaran ('will pay someone'), babayaran ('is paying someone'), beyaran ('paid someone')
- Bayaran ('to pay for something'): bayaran ('will pay for something'), babayaran ('is paying for something'), binayad ('paid for something')

Other Philippine languages have separate forms; Tagalog has -in and -an, Bikol and most of the Visayan languages have -on and -an, and Ilokano has -en and -an due to historical sound changes in the proto-Philippine /*e/.

A number of actor-focus verbs do not use the infix -um-, but are usually conjugated like other verbs which do (for example, gawa ('to do'), bulus ('to immerse'), terak ('to dance'), lukas ('to take off'), sindi ('to smoke'), saklu ('to fetch'), takbang ('to step') and tuki ('to accompany'). Many of these verbs undergo a change of vowel instead of taking the infix -in- (completed aspect). In the actor focus (-um- verbs), this happens only to verbs with the vowel /u/ in the first syllable; lukas ('to take off') is conjugated lukas ('will take off'), lulukas ('is taking off'), and likas ('took off').

This change of vowel also applies to certain object-focus verbs in the completed aspect. In addition to /u/ becoming /i/, /a/ becomes /e/ in certain cases (for example, dela ['brought something'], semal ['worked on something'] and seli ['bought']).

There is no written distinction between the two mag- affixes; magsalita may mean 'is speaking' or 'will speak', but there is an audible difference. [mɐɡsaliˈtaʔ] means 'will speak' while [ˌmaːɡsaliˈtaʔ] means 'is speaking'.

Conjugation chart
	Infinitive & contemplative	Progressive	Completed
Actor focus	-um-	CV-	-ín-
Actor focus	–	CV-	-in- -i-
Actor focus	m-	mVm-	min- me- mi-
Actor focus	mag-	mág-	mig-, meg-
Actor focus	ma-	má-	me-
Actor focus	maN-	máN-	meN-
Object focus	-an	CV- ... -an	-in- -i- -e-
Object focus Benefactive focus	i-	iCV-	i- -in- i- -i- i- -e-
Object focus Locative focus	-an	CV- ... -an	-in- ... -an -i- ... -an -e- ... -an
Instrument focus	ipaN-	páN-	piN-, peN
Reason focus	ka-	ká-	ke-

=== Enclitics ===
- warî: optionally used in yes-and-no questions and other types of questions, similar to Tagalog ba but not entirely
- ká: optionally used in yes–no questions to elicit someone's opinion or intent, similar to Malay -kah and Indonesian -kah but not entirely
- yá: optionally used in yes–no questions to seek someone and/or other's perspective or condition
- kayá, kaná: expresses wonder; I wonder; perhaps; how about; also optionally used in yes-and-no questions and other types of questions
- yatá (contracted as/informal: atá): expresses uncertainty; probably, perhaps, seems
- agyaman, man: even, even if, even though
- mo: even, even if, even though, and, also, too
- nung: conditional particle expressing an unexpected event; if
- kanu: reporting (hearsay) particle indicating that the information is second-hand; he said, she said, they said, it was said, allegedly, reportedly, supposedly
- din, rin: inclusive particle which adds something to what was said before; also, too
- iká, sana, sa: expresses hope or an unrealized condition (with verb in completed aspect); also used in conditional aspect
- itá: expresses uncertainty or an unrealized idea; perhaps, probably, seems
- mu: limiting particle; only, just
- na, pa
  - na: now, already, yet, anymore
  - pa: still, else
- namán: used in making contrasts and to soften requests and emphasis
- kasi: expresses cause; because, because of,
- pin: used in affirmations or emphasis and to soften imperatives; indeed
- palá: realization particle, indicating that the speaker has realized (or suddenly remembered) something
- pu, opu: politeness particle

Examples:

- Mangabayatan ka?: 'Is it heavy?'
- Tsa kaya?: 'How about tea?'
- Swerti kanu iti kanaku: 'I was told that it is lucky.'
- Edukado ya rin ing nobyu mu, Edukado ya din ing nobyu mu: 'Your boyfriend is also educated.'

=== Existence and possession ===
To express existence (there is, there are) and possession (to have), the word atí is used:

- Atí la namang konsyensya: They also have a conscience.

=== Negation ===
Kapampangan has two negation words: alí and alá. Alí negates verbs and equations, and means 'no' or 'not':

- Alí ya sinali. ('He did not buy.')

Alá is the opposite of atí:

- Alá na mo kanung lugud. ('They say that there is no more love.')

E is sometimes used instead of alí:

- E ke seli. ('I did not buy it.')

=== Interrogative words ===
Komustá is used to ask how something is. Frequently used as a greeting ('How are you?'), it is derived from the Spanish ¿cómo está?

- Komustá na ka? ('How are you?')
- Komustá ya ing pasyenti? ('How is the patient?')

Nanu means 'what': Nanu ya ing gagawan mu? ('What are you doing?')

Ninu means 'who':

- Ninu la reng lalaki? or Ninu la deng lalaki? ('Who are those men?')
- Ninu i(y) Jennifer? ('Who is Jennifer?')

Nukarin, meaning 'where', is used to ask about the location of an object and not used with verbs:

- Nukarin ya ing drayber/mag-manewu? ('Where is the driver?' Drayber is the Kapampangan phonetic spelling of English driver).
- Nukarin ya i(y) Henry? ('Where is Henry?')

Obakit means 'why':

- Obakit ati ka keni? ('Why are you here?')
- Obakit ala ka king bale yu? ('Why are you not in your house?')

Kaninu means 'whose' or 'whom':

- Kaninu me ibiye iyan? ('To whom will you give that?')
- Kaninung kalikubak ini? ('Whose dandruff is this?')

Pilan means 'how many':

- Pilan a kapaya? ('How many papayas?')
- Pilan kayung magkaputul? ('How many children did your mother birth?')

Kapilan means 'when':

- Kapilan ya ing pista? ('When is the fiesta?')
- Kapilan kebaitan mu? ('When is your birthday?')

Makananu means 'how':

- Makananu iti gawan? ('How do you do this?')
- Makananu maging produktibung miyembru na ning lipunan? ('How do you become a productive member of the society?')

Magkanu means 'how much':

- Magkanu ya ing metung a tinape? ('How much is one bread?')
- Magkanu la ring milktea, burger at fries? ('How much are the milktea, burger and fries?')

Nuanti means 'to what degree':

- Nuanti ka kalagu? ('How beautiful are you?', literally 'To what degree are you beautiful?')
- Nuanti karakal ya ing seli yu? ('How many did you buy?', literally 'To what amount did you buy?')

Isanu/Isnanu means 'which':

- Isanu deti ya ing bisa ka? ('Which of these do you want?')
- Isanu karela ya ing pilian mu? ('Who do you choose among them?')

== Lexicon ==
Kapampangan borrowed many words from Chinese (particularly Cantonese and Hokkien), such as:

- Ápû, '(paternal) grandmother', from 阿婆
- Bápa, 'uncle', from 爸伯
- Ditsí, '2nd eldest sister', from 二姊
- Díko, '2nd eldest brother', from 二哥
- Dízon, '2nd eldest grandson' (a surname), from 二孫
- Gózun, Gózon, '5th eldest grandson' (a surname), from 五孫
- Lácson, '6th eldest grandson' (a surname), from 六孫
- Pekson, '8th eldest grandson' (a surname), from 八孫
- Quezon, 'strongest grandson' (a surname), from 雞孫
- Impû, '(maternal) grandmother', from 外婆
- Ingkung, '(maternal) grandfather', from 外公
- Atsi, 'eldest sister', from 阿姐
- Kóya, 'eldest brother', 哥仔
- Sanko, '3rd eldest brother', from 三哥
- Satsi, '3rd eldest sister', from 三姊
- Sámson, '3rd eldest grandson' (a surname), from 三孫
- Sese, 'pet, to look after, thank you' (name), from 謝謝
- Síson, '4th eldest grandson' (a surname), from 四孫
- Sitson, '7th eldest grandson' (a surname), from 七孫
- Susi, 'key', from 鎖匙
- Sitsí, '4th eldest sister', from 四姊
- Síko, '4th eldest brother', from 四哥
- Tuázon, 'eldest grandson' (a surname), from 太孫
- Pansit, 'noodles' (literally 'instant meal'), from 便食
- Buisit, 'bad luck' (literally 'without clothes and food'), from 無衣食
- Tiâ, 'tea', from 茶
- Laggiû, 'name', from 你叫
- Buan,'full, satisfied' (a surname), from 滿
- Pétsai, 'Chinese lettuce', from 白菜
- Gintu, 'Gold' (a surname), from 金條
- Lumpiâ, 'spring roll', from 潤餅
- Bátsuî, Kapampangan soup, from 肉水
- Tawû, 'tofu' (a snack), from 豆花
- Tóyû, 'soy sauce', from 豆油
- Tansû, 'copper wire', from 銅索
- Bakiâ, 'wooden clogs', from 木屐

Many Filipino surnames that end with "on", "son", and "zon" are of Chinese origin, Hispanized version of 孫 (sun).

Due to the influence of Buddhism and Hinduism, Kapampangan also acquired words from Sanskrit. A few examples are:

- Aláya, 'home', from the Sanskrit आलय alaya
- Kalma, 'fate', from the Sanskrit कर्म karma
- Damla, 'divine law', from the Sanskrit धर्म dharma
- Mantála, 'magic formulas', from the Sanskrit मन्त्र mantra
- Upáya, 'power', from the Sanskrit उपाय upaya
- Siuálâ, 'voice', from the Sanskrit स्वर svara
- Lúpa, 'face', from the Sanskrit रुपा rupa
- Sabla, 'every', from the Sanskrit सर्व sarva
- Láwû, 'eclipse/dragon', from the Sanskrit राहु rahu
- Galúrâ, 'giant eagle' (a surname, 'phoenix'), from the Sanskrit गरुड garuda
- Láksina, 'south' (a surname), from the Sanskrit दक्षिण dakshin
- Laksamana, 'admiral' (a surname), from the Sanskrit लक्ष्मण lakshmana
- Pápâ 'demerit, bad karma' from the Sanskrit पाप pāpá
- Palâ 'fruit, blessings' from the Sanskrit फल phala

The language has also absorbed many Spanish loanwords due to the 333 years of presence of the Spaniards in the Kapampangan speaking provinces. Hence, Spanish Days of the Week, Months, and Numbers are used in Kapampangan respectively. Many Spanish expressions, basic nouns, verbs, and phrases are also present in the Language. Such as, ("Kómusta?") from Spanish, "cómo estás" which means 'how are you?'. (this common expression can also be found in other Philippine Languages, such as Tagalog, Bisaya, Hiligaynon, etc. Other examples are:

- Aparte, 'aside or apart', from Spanish 'Aparte'
- Casafuego, 'matchstick', from Mexican Spanish "Casa fuego". 'Fósforro' which is also Spanish, is also commonly used by the Speakers.
- Mariposa, 'butterfly', from Spanish 'Mariposa'
- Primeru, 'first', from Spanish 'Primero'
- Matsura, 'ugly', from Spanish 'Mala Hechura'
- Domingu, 'sunday', from Spanish 'Domingo'
- Filipinas, 'philippines', from Spanish 'Filipinas'

== Orthography ==
Amánung Sísuan (honorific name for 'mother language' (literally 'nurtured or suckled language') in Kulitan, Kapampangan's indigenous writing system

Kapampangan, like most Philippine languages, uses the Latin alphabet. Before the Spanish colonization of the Philippines, it was written in old Kapampangan writing. Kapampangan is usually written in one of three different writing systems: sulat Baculud, sulat Wawa and a hybrid of the two, Amung Samson.

The first system (sulat Baculud, also known as tutung Capampangan or tutung Kapampangan in the sulat Wawa system) is based on Spanish orthography, a feature of which involved the use of the letters ⟨c⟩ and ⟨q⟩ to represent the phoneme /k/ (depending on the vowel sound following the phoneme). ⟨C⟩ was used before /a/, /o/ and /u/ (ca, co and cu), and ⟨q⟩ was used with ⟨u⟩ before the vowels /e/ and /i/ (que, qui). The preposition king is spelled qng. The Spanish-based orthography is primarily associated with literature by authors from Bacolor and the text used on the Kapampangan Pasion.

The second system, the Sulat Wawa, is an "indigenized" form which preferred ⟨k⟩ over ⟨c⟩ and ⟨q⟩ in representing the phoneme /k/. This orthography, based on the Abakada alphabet was used by writers from Guagua and rivaled writers from the nearby town of Bacolor.

The third system, Amung Samson hybrid orthography, intends to resolve the conflict in spelling between proponents of the sulat Baculud and sulat Wawa. This system was created by former Catholic priest Venancio Samson during the 1970s to translate the Bible into Kapampangan. It resolved conflicts between the use of ⟨q⟩ and ⟨c⟩ (in sulat Baculud) and ⟨k⟩ (in sulat Wawa) by using ⟨k⟩ before ⟨e⟩ and ⟨i⟩ (instead of [qu]⟩ and using ⟨c⟩ before ⟨a⟩, ⟨o⟩, and ⟨u⟩ (instead of ⟨k⟩). The system also removed ⟨ll⟩ and ⟨ñ⟩ (from Spanish), replacing them with ⟨ly⟩ and ⟨ny⟩.

Orthography has been debated by Kapampangan writers, and orthographic styles may vary by writer. The sulat Wawa system has become the popular method of writing due to the influence of the Tagalog-based Filipino language (the national language) and its orthography. The sulat Wawa system is used by the Akademyang Kapampangan and the poet Jose Gallardo. In 2016, the Filipino-based orthography became the official orthography of the Kapampangan language.

== Prayers, words and sentences ==
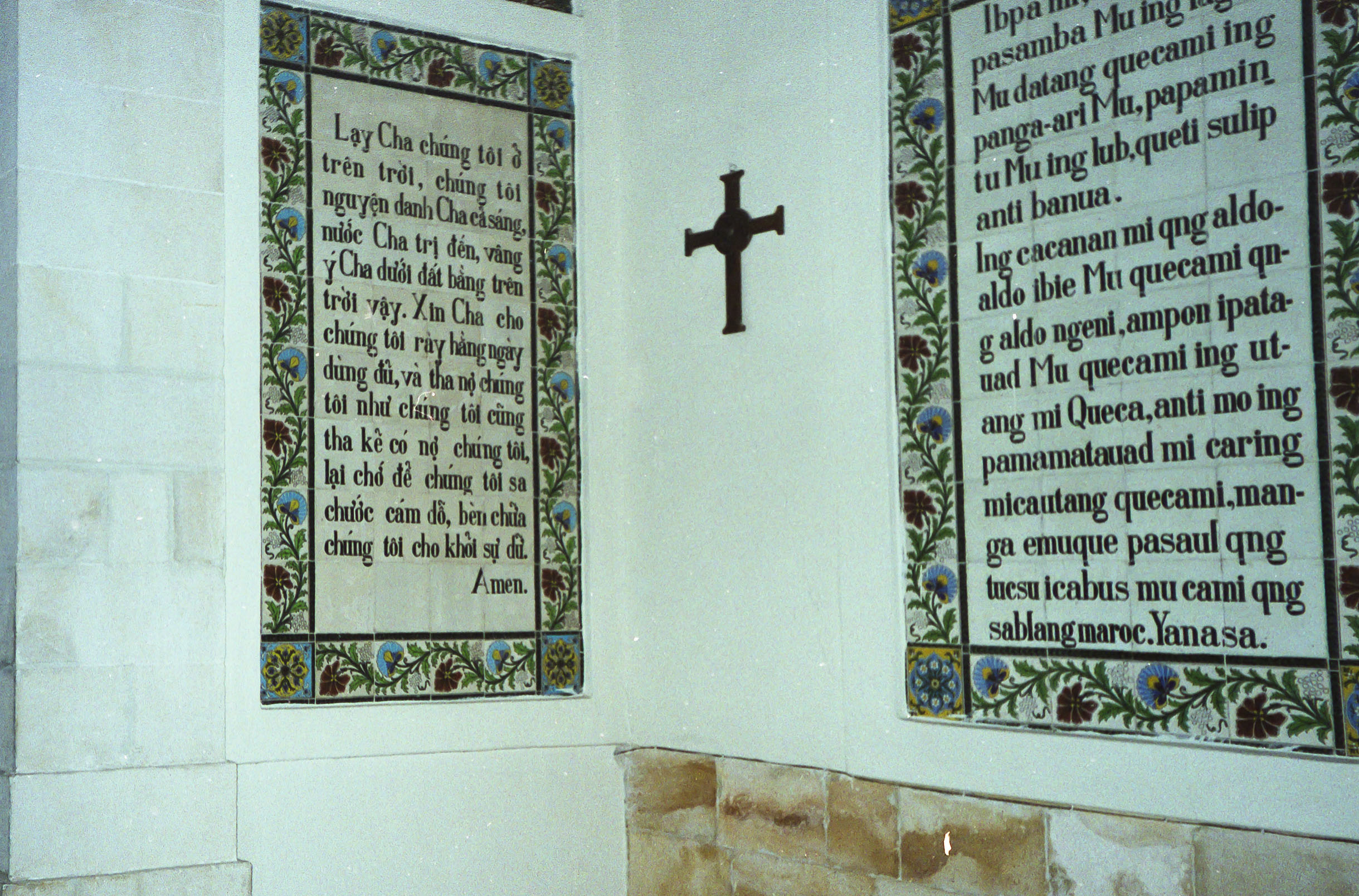
The Church of the Pater Noster in Jerusalem, with a Kapampangan version of the Lord's Prayer on the right (in sulat Baculud spelling).

- Sign of the Cross: Uli ning tanda ning Santa Cruz, karing masamá kekami, ikabus Mu kami, Ginu ming Dios. King lagyu ning +Ibpa, ampon ning Anak, ampon ning Espiritu Santo. Amen.
- Apostle's Creed: Sasalpantaya ku king Dios, Ibpang mayupayang tutu, linalang king banwa't yatu. At kang Hesukristong Anak nang Bugtung a Ginu tamu. Pengagli Ya king upaya ning Banal a Espiritu, mibayit Ya kang Santa Mariang Birhen. Linasa Ya lalam nang upaya nang Poncio Pilato. Mipaku ya king krus, mete Ya't mikutkut. Tinipa Ya karing mete. King katlung aldo, sinubli yang mebie. Pepaitas Ya banua, makalukluk wanan ning Dios Ibpang mayupayang tutu. Ibat karin, magbalik Ya naman keti ban mukum karing mabie ampon mengamate. Sasalpantaya ku king Banal a Espiritu, ang Santa Iglesia Katolika, ang pamisamak ding Santos, ang pangapatauadda ring kasalanan, king pangasubli rang mie ring mete, at king bie alang angga. Amen.
- The Lord's Prayer: Ibpa mi, a atiu banua. Misamban ya ing lagyu Mu. Datang kekami ing kayarian Mu. Mipamintuan ing lub Mu, keti sulip anti banua. Ing kakanan mi king aldo-aldo ibie Mu kekami king aldo ngeni. Ampon ipatawad Mo kekami ring sala mi Keka, anti ing pamamatauad mi karing mikasala kekami. E Mu ke ipaisaul king tuksu, nune ikabus Mu kami karing sablang marok. Amen.
- Hail Mary: Bapu, Maria! Mitmu ka king grasya. Ing Ginung Dios atyu keka. Nuan ka karing sablang babayi, at nuan ya pa naman ing bunga ning atian mu, i(y) Jesús. Santa Maria, Indu ning Dios. Ipanalangin mu keng makasalanan, ngeni, ampon king oras ning kamatayan mi. Amen.
- Gloria Patri: Ligaya king Ibpa, at ang Anak, at ang Espiritu Santo. Antimo ing sadya nang ligaya ibat king kamumulan, ngeni't kapilan man, mangga man king alang angga. Amen.
- Salve Regina: Bapu Reyna, Indung Mamakalulu, bie ampon yumu, manga panaligan mi, Bapu Reyna, ikang ausan mi, ikeng pepalakuan a anak nang Eva; ikang pangisnawan ming malalam, daralung ke manga tatangis keni king karinan ning luwa. Ngamu na Reyna, Patulunan mi, balicdan mu kami karing mata mung mapamakalulu, ampon nung mapupus, pangalako mu queti sulip, pakit me kekami i(y) Hesus, a bungang masampat ning atian mu. O malugud! O mapamakalulu! O Santa Maria Birhen a mayumu! Ipanalangin mu kami, O Santang Indu ning Dios. Ba'keng sukat makinabang karing pengaku nang Hesukristong Ginu tamu.

Numbers:

- One – isa (used when reciting numbers; métung used for counting)
- Two – aduá
- Three – atlú
- Four – ápat
- Five – limá
- Six – ánam
- Seven – pitú
- Eight – ualú
- Nine – s'yám
- Ten – apúlu

Sentences:

- My name is John. – Juan ya ing lagyu ku.
- I am here! – Atyu ku keni! (Ati ku keni!)
- Where are you? – Nukarin ka (kanyan)?
- I love you. – Kaluguran daka.
- What do you want? – Nanu ya ing buri mu?
- Good morning! - Mayap a yabak (pu)!
- Good afternoon! - Mayap a gatpanapun (pu)!
- Good evening! - Mayap a bengi (pu)!
- I will go home. – Muli ku.
- They don't want to eat. – Ali la bisang mangan.
- He bought rice. – Sinali yang nasi.
- She likes that. – Buri ne ita.
- May I go out? – Malyari ku waring lumwal?
- I can't sleep. – Ali ku mipapatudtud.
- We are afraid. – Tatakut kami.
- My pet died yesterday. – Mete ya ing sese ku napun.
- How old are you? – Pilan na kang banua?
- How did you do that? – Makananu meng gewa ita?
- How did you get here? – Katnamu ka miparas keni?
- How big is it? – Makananu ya karagul? (Nu anti ya karagul?)
- When will you be back? – Kapilan ka mibalik?
- A baby is born? - Metung a anak ing mibait?

Article 1 of the Universal Declaration of Human Rights in Kapampangan:

Ding sablang tau mibait lang malaya at pante-pante king karangalan at karapatan. Ila mipagkaluban lang katuliran at konsensiya ay dapat misaupan king diwang pamikapatiran.

Article 1 of the Universal Declaration of Human Rights in English:

All human beings are born free and equal in dignity and rights. They are endowed with reason and conscience and should act towards one another in a spirit of brotherhood.

- Malayo-Polynesian languages
- Tarlac
- Bataan
