= Bolinao language =

Austronesian language spoken in the Philippines

Bolinao
- Bino-Bolinao, Binubolinao, Binubulinao, Boliano, Bolinao Sambal, Bolinao Zambal, Bulinaw, Sambal Bolinao
- Binu-Bolinao
- Native to: Philippines
- Region: Bolinao and Anda, Pangasinan
- Ethnicity: Bolinao people
- Native speakers: 51,000 (2007 census)
- Language family: Austronesian: Malayo-Polynesian; Philippine; Central Luzon; Sambalic; Bolinao
- Writing system: Latin (Filipino alphabet); Historically Baybayin

Official status
- Regulated by: Komisyon sa Wikang Filipino

Language codes
- ISO 639-3: smk
- Glottolog: boli1256

The Bolinao language or Binubolinao is a Central Luzon language spoken primarily in the municipalities of Bolinao and Anda, Pangasinan in the Philippines. It has approximately 50,000 speakers, making it the second most widely spoken Sambalic language. Most Bolinao speakers can speak Pangasinan and/or Ilocano. Ethnologue reports 510 monolinguals for this language.

== Phonology ==
Bolinao has 21 phonemes: 16 consonants and five vowels. Syllable structure is relatively simple. Each syllable contains at least a consonant and a vowel.

=== Vowels ===
Bolinao has five vowels. They are:

- /a/ an open front unrounded vowel similar to English father
- /ə/ (written as ⟨e⟩) a mid central vowel pronounced as in English telephone
- /i/ a close front unrounded vowel similar to English machine
- /o/ a close-mid back rounded vowel similar to English forty
- /u/ a close back rounded vowel similar to English flute

There are six main diphthongs: /aɪ/, /əɪ/, /oɪ/, /uɪ/, /aʊ/, and /iʊ/.

=== Consonants ===
Below is a chart of Bolinao consonants. All the stops are unaspirated. The velar nasal occurs in all positions including at the beginning of a word.

Bolinao consonants
		Bilabial	Dental	Palatal	Velar	Glottal
Nasal		m	n	(ny) /ɲ/	ng /ŋ/	
Plosive	Voiceless	p	t		k	’ /ʔ/
Plosive	Voiced	b	d		g	
Affricate	Voiceless		(ts)	(ty) /tʃ/		
Affricate	Voiced			(dy) /dʒ/		
Fricative			s	(sy) /ʃ/		h
Flap			ɾ			
Approximant				j	w	
Lateral			l	(ly) /ʎ/		

== Grammar ==
The first known grammar on the Bolinao language is the Arte de la Lengua Sambala y Española (translation from Spanish: Grammar of the Sambal and Spanish languages). It was written by an anonymous source likely with the oldest paragraphs dating to or close to 1601, with the date 1601 written on the colophon. As written in red ink on the final page, it was "found ... on the ground in the village of Bolinao... in the year 1780", most likely by Fray Agustín María de Castro (1740–1801). Today, it is housed in the Archive of the Philippine Augustinian convent in Valladolid, Spain.

== Language comparison ==
A common proverb from Filipino hero Jose Rizal in English, "He who does not acknowledge his beginnings will not reach his destination," is translated into Bolinao, followed by the provincial language Pangasinan, the regional language Ilocano, and the original in Tagalog for comparison:

Bolinao	Si'ya a kai tanda' nin lumingap sa pinangibwatan na, kai ya makarate' sa keen na.
Pangasinan	Say toon agga onlingao ed pinanlapuan to, agga makasabi'd laen to.
Ilocano	Ti tao nga saan na ammo tumaliaw iti naggapuanna ket saan nga makadanon iti papananna.
Tagalog	Ang hindi marunong lumingon sa pinanggalingan ay hindi makararating sa paroroonan.

== See also ==
- Languages of the Philippines
