= Ambala language =

Austronesian language spoken in the Philippines

Ambala
- Ambala Ayta
- Native to: Philippines
- Region: Zambales, Olongapo, Dinalupihan
- Native speakers: (1,700 cited 1986)
- Language family: Austronesian: Malayo-Polynesian; Philippine; Central Luzon; Sambalic; Ambala

Language codes
- ISO 639-3: abc
- Glottolog: amba1267

Ambala is a Sambalic language spoken in the Philippines. It has more than 2,000 speakers and is spoken within Aeta communities in the Zambal municipalities of Subic, San Marcelino, and Castillejos; in the city of Olongapo; and in Dinalupihan, Bataan.

Reid (1994) reports the following Ambala locations, from SIL word lists:

- Maliwacat, Cabalan, Olongapo, Zambales
- Batong Kalyo (Pili), San Marcelino, Zambales

Himes (2012) also collected Ambala data from the following locations:

- Pastolan, Subic Bay Metropolitan Authority
- Gordon Heights, Olongapo City

== See also ==
- Languages of the Philippines
