= Botolan =

Municipality in Zambales, Philippines

- Municipality
- Municipality of Botolan
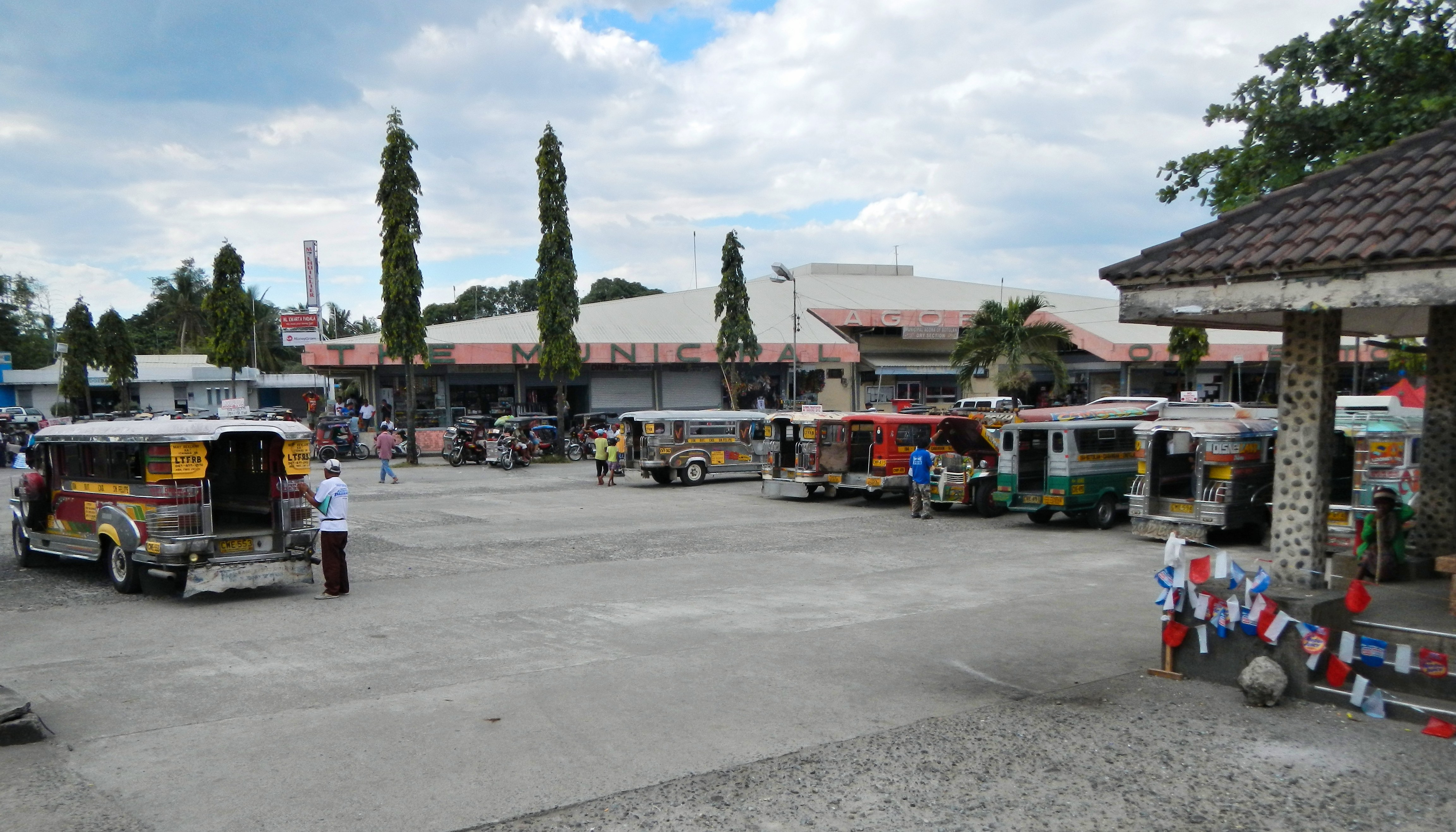
- Poblacion, Botolan

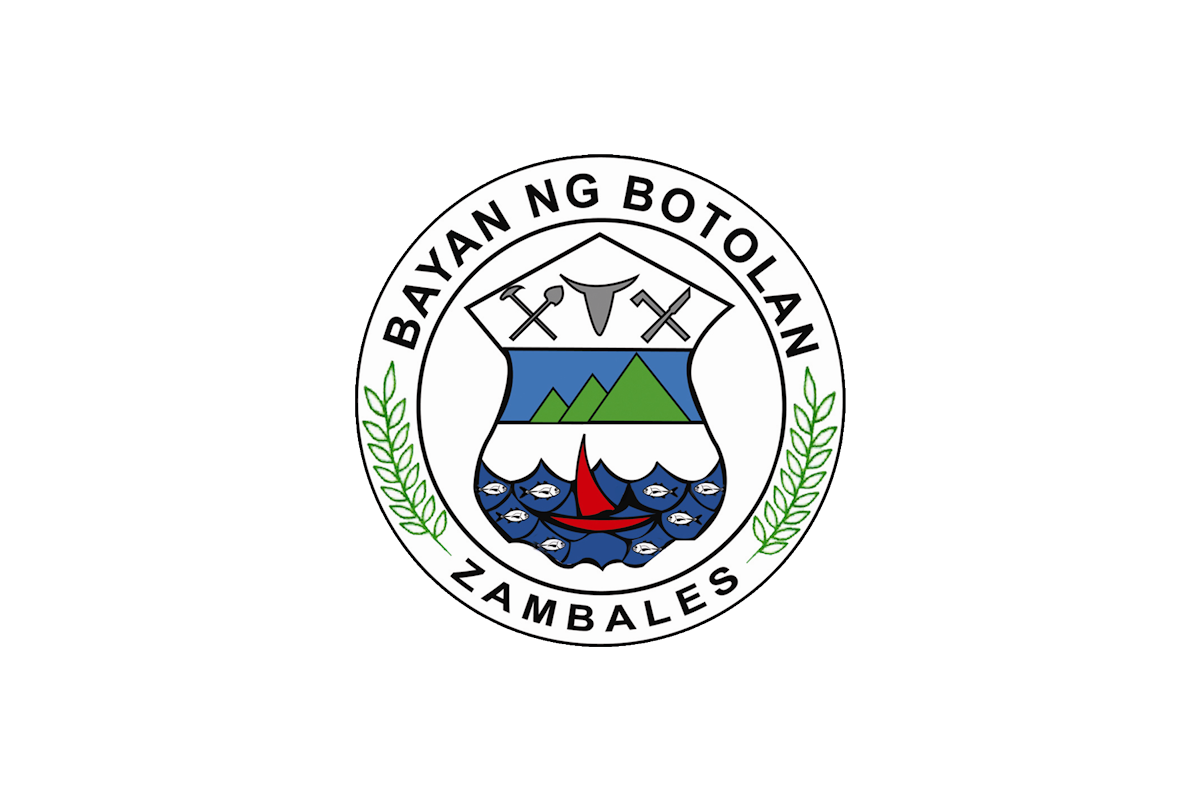
- Flag Seal

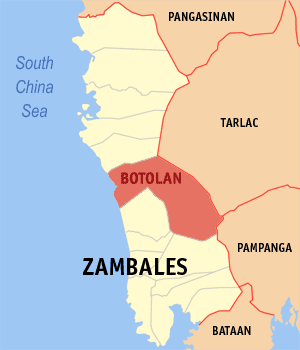
- Map of Zambales with Botolan highlighted
- Interactive map of Botolan
- Location within the Philippines
- Coordinates: 15°17′23″N 120°01′28″E
- Country: Philippines
- Region: Central Luzon
- Province: Zambales
- District: 2nd district
- Founded: 1572
- Founder: Governor-General Juan de Salcedo
- Barangays: 31 (see Barangays)

Government
  - Type: Sangguniang Bayan
  - Mayor: Jun Omar Ebdane
  - Vice Mayor: Doris D. Ladines
  - Representative: Doris E. Maniquiz
  - Municipal Council: Members: Edmund Dante D. Perez; Angelito B. Diesta; Amor B. Caasi; Nick L. Manzo; Fernando D. Igrobay; Aris George D. Lingat; Jesus D. Jaring; Glenn C. Manangan
  - Electorate: 46,839 voters (2025)

Area
  - Total: 735.28 km^{2} (283.89 sq mi)
- Elevation: 28 m (92 ft)
- Highest elevation: 1,486 m (4,875 ft)
- Lowest elevation: 0 m (0 ft)

Population (2024 census)
  - Total: 70,340
  - Density: 95.66/km^{2} (247.8/sq mi)
  - Households: 17,547

Economy
  - Income class: 1st municipal income class
  - Poverty incidence: 19.09% (2023)
  - Revenue: ₱ 789.8 million (2024)
  - Assets: ₱ 1,843 million (2024)
  - Expenditure: ₱ 662.1 million (2024)
  - Liabilities: ₱ 663.9 million (2024)

Service provider
  - Electricity: Zambales 1 Electric Cooperative (ZAMECO 1)
- Time zone: UTC+8 (PST)
- ZIP code: 2202
- PSGC: 0307101000
- IDD : area code: +63 (0)47
- Native languages: Botolan; Sambal; Ilocano; Tagalog; Abellen; Mag-antsi
- Major religions: Roman Catholicism; Aglipayan Church; Protestantism; Islam
- Feast date: January 24
- Ecclesiastical dioceses: Diocese of Iba (Roman Catholic); Diocese of Zambales (Aglipayan Church)
- Patron saint: Our Lady of Poon Bato
- Website: sbbotolan.com

Botolan, officially the Municipality of Botolan, is a municipality in the province of Zambales, Philippines. According to the 2024 census, it has a population of 70,340 people.

== Etymology ==
The name Botolan came from the a native variety of banana common in the area called "Boto-an". The word "Boto-an" is a Sambal word which combines the word botol which means "seeds" and the locative prefix -an, referring to a place with many seeded bananas.

== History ==
The municipality was founded by Spanish conquistador Juan de Salcedo in 1572.

=== Third Republic ===
On November 3, 1962, Mayor Florentino Dullo and nearly 3,000 other Nacionalista officials in Zambales joined the Liberal Party, aligning themselves with the Macapagal administration.

== Geography ==
Located just south of the provincial capital of Iba, Botolan has the largest land area of the municipalities in Zambales.

Botolan is 7 kilometres (4.3 mi) from Iba, 71 kilometres (44 mi) from Olongapo, and 197 kilometres (122 mi) from Manila. It is between Cabangan and Iba on the Olongapo–Bugallon Road.

=== Barangays ===
Botolan is politically subdivided into 31 barangays, as indicated below. Each barangay consists of puroks and some have sitios.

- Bancal
- Bangan
- Batonlapoc
- Belbel
- Beneg
- Binuclutan
- Burgos
- Cabatuan
- Capayawan
- Carael
- Danacbunga
- Maguisguis
- Malomboy
- Mambog
- Moraza
- Nacolcol
- Owaog-Nibloca
- Paco (poblacion)
- Palis
- Panan
- Parel
- Paudpod
- Poonbato
- Porac
- San Isidro
- San Juan
- San Miguel
- Santiago
- Tampo (poblacion)
- Taugtog
- Villar

=== Climate ===
Climate data for Botolan, Zambales
Month	Jan	Feb	Mar	Apr	May	Jun	Jul	Aug	Sep	Oct	Nov	Dec	Year
Mean daily maximum °C (°F)	31 (88)	32 (90)	33 (91)	34 (93)	32 (90)	31 (88)	29 (84)	29 (84)	29 (84)	30 (86)	31 (88)	31 (88)	31 (88)
Mean daily minimum °C (°F)	20 (68)	20 (68)	21 (70)	23 (73)	25 (77)	25 (77)	25 (77)	25 (77)	24 (75)	23 (73)	22 (72)	20 (68)	23 (73)
Average precipitation mm (inches)	16 (0.6)	18 (0.7)	28 (1.1)	51 (2.0)	200 (7.9)	253 (10.0)	301 (11.9)	293 (11.5)	246 (9.7)	171 (6.7)	70 (2.8)	28 (1.1)	1,675 (66)
Average rainy days	6.2	7.1	10.4	15.5	24.4	26.4	28.2	27.5	26.2	23.6	15.9	8.7	220.1
Source: Meteoblue (modeled/calculated data, not measured locally)

== Demographics ==
Population census of Botolan

Year	Pop.	±% p.a.
1903	5,174	—
1918	8,814	+3.62%
1939	11,817	+1.41%
1948	11,535	−0.27%
1960	16,417	+2.98%
1970	23,848	+3.80%

Year	Pop.	±% p.a.
1975	27,307	+2.75%
1980	27,125	−0.13%
1990	35,604	+2.76%
1995	41,084	+2.72%
2000	46,602	+2.74%
2007	51,675	+1.44%

Year	Pop.	±% p.a.
2010	54,434	+1.91%
2015	57,707	+1.12%
2020	66,739	+3.11%
2024	70,340	+1.27%

Source: Philippine Statistics Authority

In the 2024 census, the population of Botolan was 70,340 people, with a density of 96 inhabitants per square kilometre or 250 inhabitants per square mile.

== Economy ==
Poverty incidence of Botolan (%)

Source: Philippine Statistics Authority

== Government ==
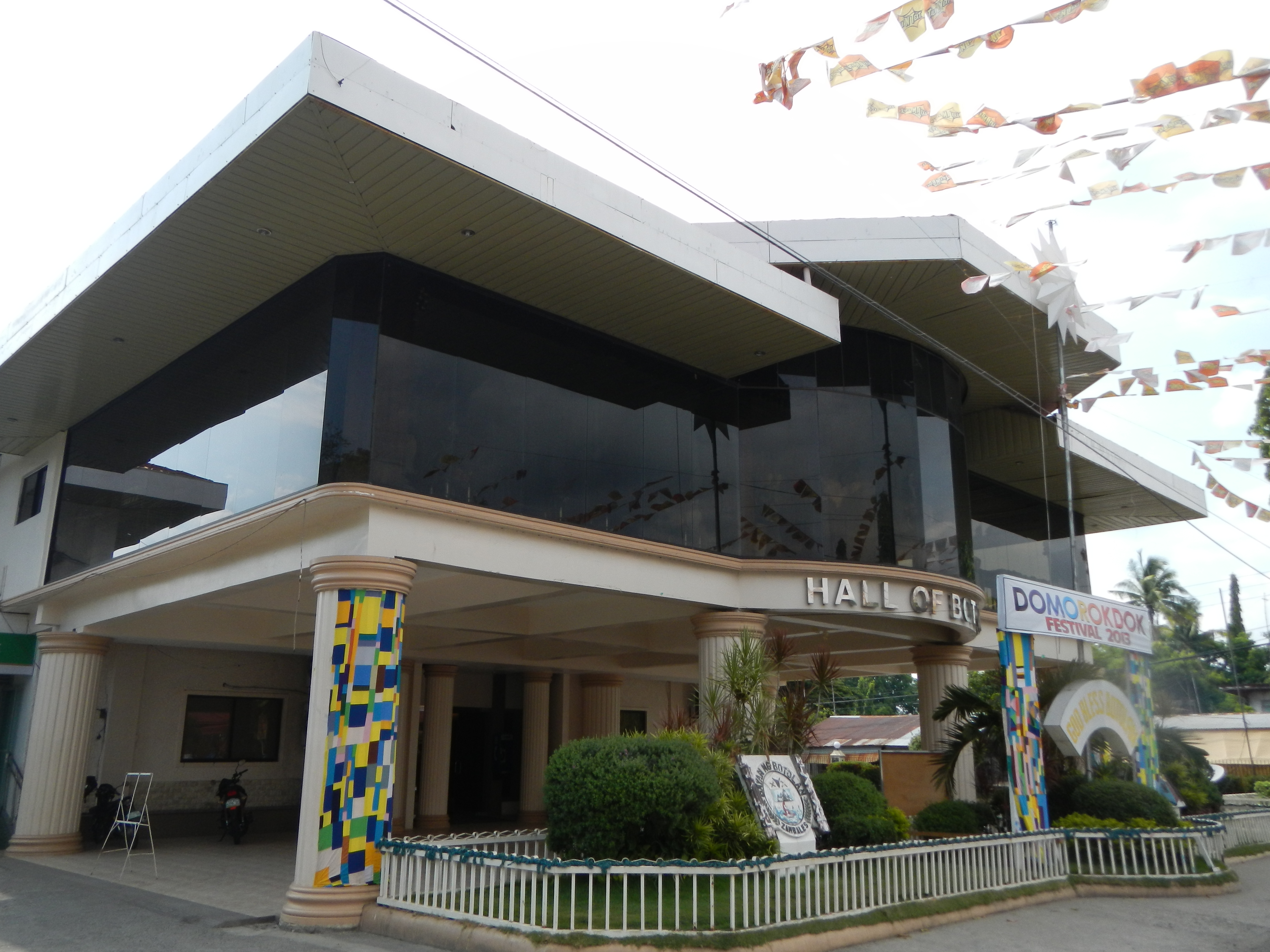
Town hall of Botolan

=== Elected officials ===
Municipal officials (2025-2028)

- Mayor: Jun Omar Ebdane
- Vice Mayor: Atty. Ed Perez
- Members of the Municipal Council:
  - Doris Ladines
  - Eddie Daos
  - Lance Lim
  - Angel Diesta
  - Jay Dilag
  - Fernando Igrobay
  - Arthur Daria
  - Gregorio Jaring

== Tourism ==
The beach at Barangay Beneg, looking south towards the Bucao River

The barangay of Binoclutan is the "Beach Capital" of Botolan, featuring several first class resorts. The area is a habitat of sea turtles, as is all of the Zambales coastline. Olive Ridley, Green turtles and Hawksbill turtles nest along the beaches of Botolan every year between September and January. A turtle hatchery located is located in Binoklutan. The area also has many other attractions, beach resorts, waterfalls, hiking paths, views of the lahar fields left by the 1991 eruption of Mount Pinatubo, and views of Mount Pinatubo itself.

The Fiesta Poon Bato, held January 23–24, is a religious festival that attracts up to 500,000 devotees. Features include cultural dancing from local Aeta tribes in the town plaza on the first night.

The Domorokdok Festival, held May 3–4, includes street parades, street dancing, a beauty pageant and displays of Botolan products and industries.

=== Ina Poon Bato ===
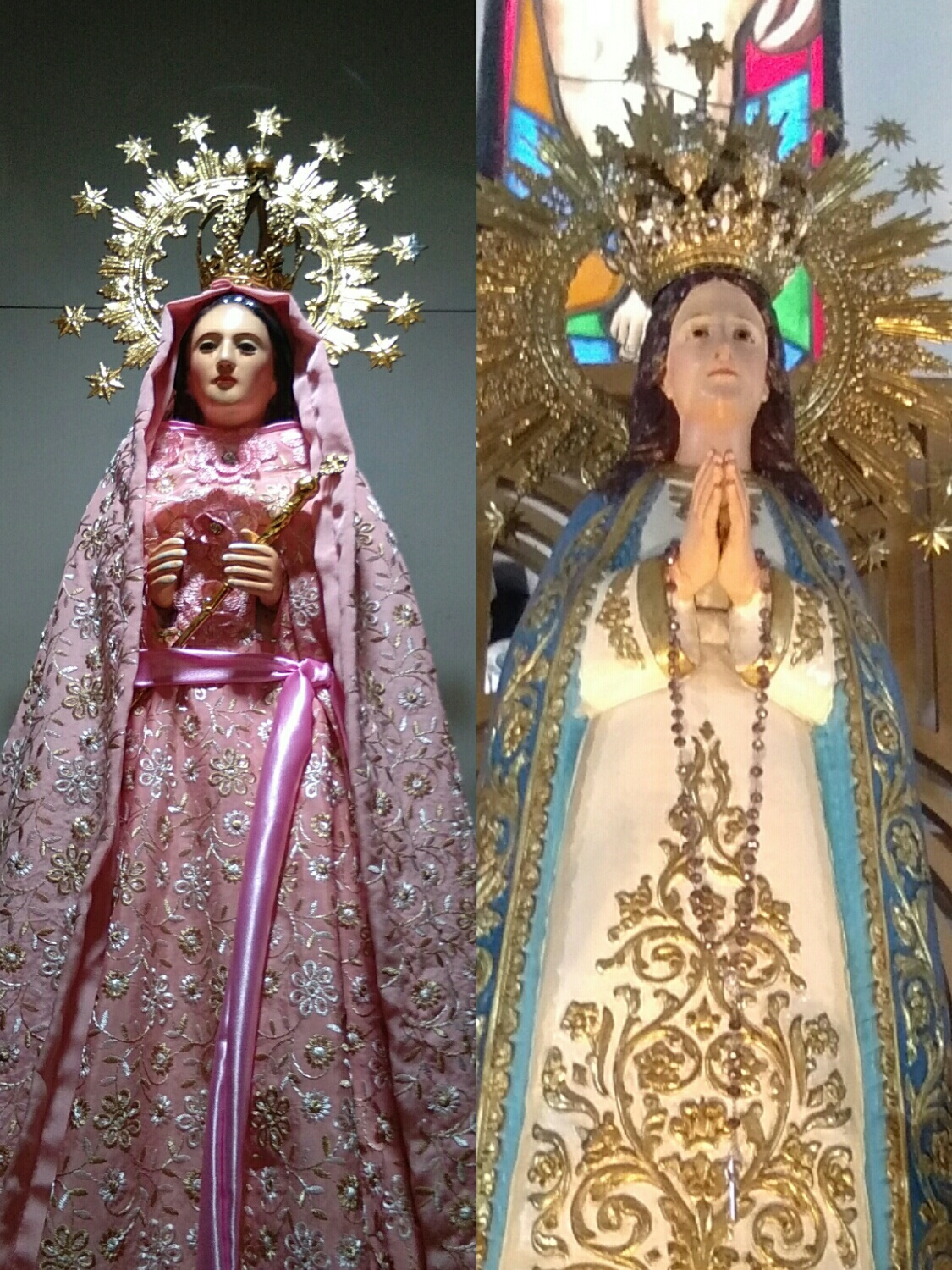
Left: Original Statue of Apo Apang (Aglipayan Church), Right: Replica Statue of Ina Poon Bato (Roman Catholic).

The Ina Poón Bató is a purportedly miraculous, syncretised image of the Blessed Virgin Mary. Legend has it that before the arrival of the Spanish in the area sometime in the 17th century, local Aeta peoples had discovered a carved wooden statue on a large rock and began worshipping the image. On the arrival of Recollect missionaries in 1607, the natives associated the statue with the Roman Catholic depictions of the Virgin Mary, and the image was subsequently Christianised as Ina Poonbato (Our Lady of Poonbato) . The original image was previously in the Recollect missionaries’ custody. During the Philippine Revolution, the Filipino revolutionaries took the image and enshrined it in an Aglipayan Church.

The Catholic image was canonically blessed by Pope John Paul II in 1985 at a ceremony in Vatican City. After the 1991 eruption of Mount Pinatubo destroyed the original village of Poonbato, the patio image (which was found intact and buried chest-deep in lahar) and its shrine were moved to the nearby resettlement area of Loob-Bunga. The feast of Ina Poón Bató is celebrated every late January, with devotees flocking to the original image inside a chapel belonging to the Aglipayan Church, and the 1976 replica enshrined in the Catholic chapel.

== Education ==
There are two schools district offices which govern all educational institutions within the municipality. They oversee the management and operations of all private and public, from primary to secondary schools.

=== Primary and elementary schools ===
- Alao Elementary School
- Baquilan I Resettlement School
- Baquilan II Resettlement School
- Batonlapoc Elementary School
- Belbel Elementary School
- Beneg Elementary School
- Bihawo Elementary School
- Binoclutan Elementary School
- Botolan South Central School
- Burgos Elementary School
- Casa Mambog Learning Center
- Danacbunga Elementary School
- Fountain of Blessings Development Center
- Kainomayan Village Elementary School
- Loob-Bunga I Elementary School
- Loob-Bunga II Elementary School
- Loob-Bunga III Elementary School
- Moraza Elementary School
- New Taugtog I Elementary School
- New Taugtog II Elementary School
- Owaog-Nebloc Elementary School
- Paitan Elementary School
- Palis Elementary School
- Panan Elementary School
- Paudpod Elementary School
- Parel Elementary School
- San Isidro Elementary School
- Sta. Monica Parochial Institute (Elementary)

=== Secondary schools ===
- Botolan National High School
- Baquilan Resettlement High School
- Beneg National High School
- Loob Bunga High School (Resettlement School)
- Panan National High School
- New Taugtog National High School
- Lakas High School
- Maguisguis Integrated School
- Dojoc Balite Intergrated School
- Bancal Integrated School
- San Juan Integrated School
- Cabatuan Integrated School
- Porac Integrated School
- Mambog Integrated School
- Nacolcol Integrated School
- Botolan North Integrated School
- Bangan-Capayawan Integrated School
- Villar Integrated School
- Carael Integrated School
- Bucao Integrated School
- Santiago Integrated School
- Moraza Integrated School
- Lyceum of Central Luzon
- Lyceum of Western Luzon
- Sta. Monica Parochial Institute

=== Higher educational institutions ===
- Columban College
- Micro Asia College of Science and Technology
- Mother Theresa Collegio de Zambales
- Technological College
- Polytechnic College of Botolan (PCB)
