= Anda, Pangasinan =

Municipality in Pangasinan, Philippines

Anda
- Municipality
- Municipality of Anda
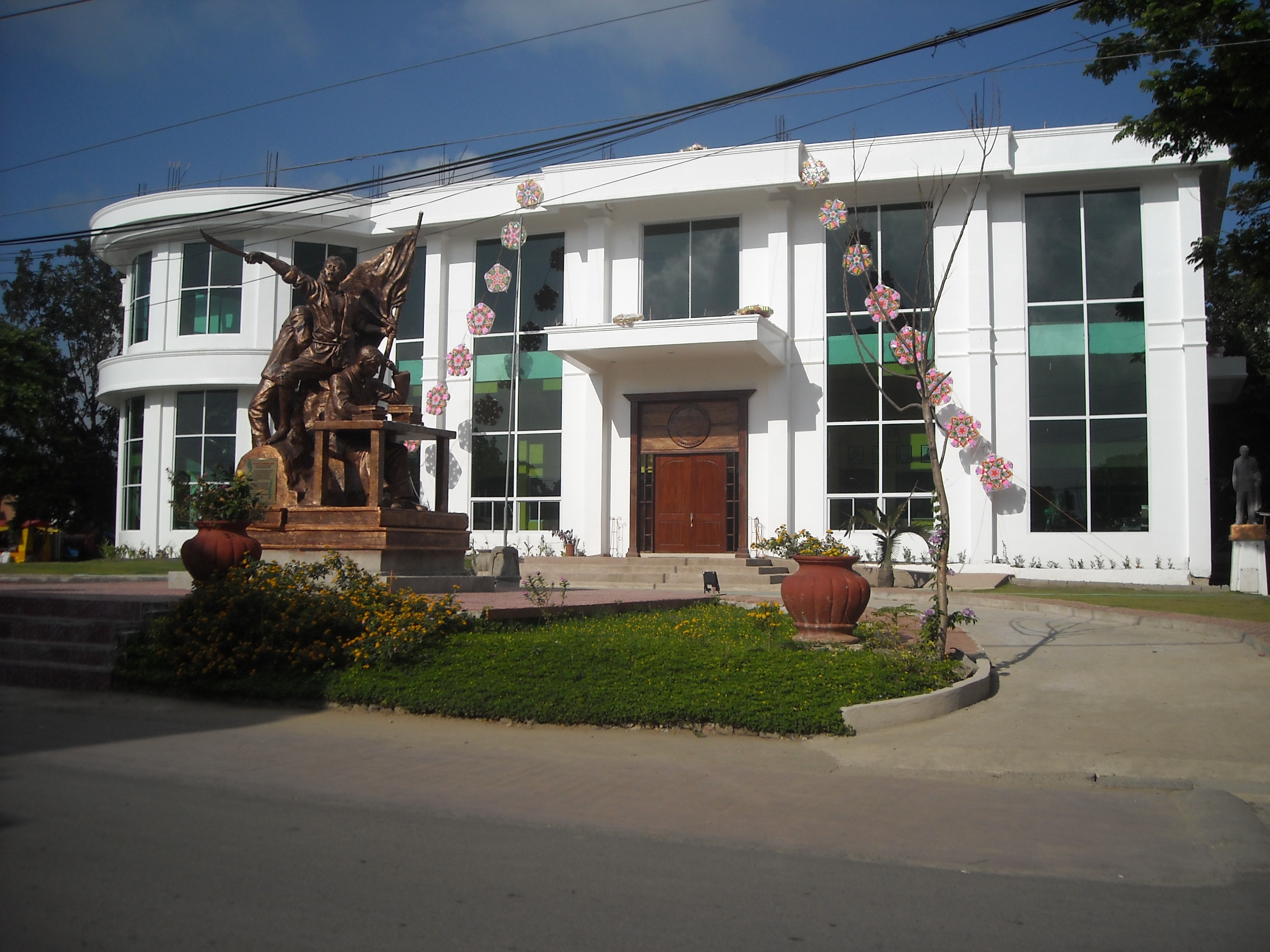
- Anda Municipal Hall

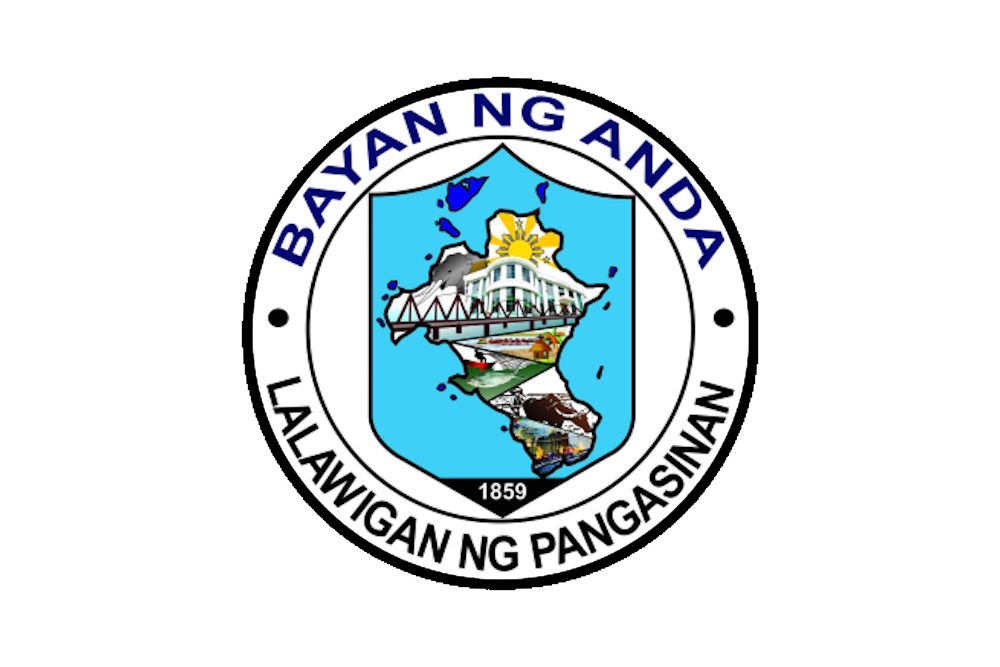
- Flag

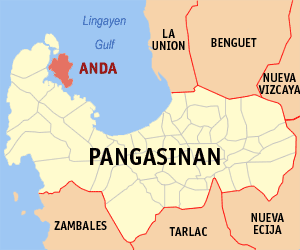
- Map of Pangasinan with Anda highlighted
- Interactive map of Anda
- Location within the Philippines
- Coordinates: 16°17′23″N 119°56′57″E
- Country: Philippines
- Region: Ilocos Region
- Province: Pangasinan
- District: 1st district
- Founded: 1852
- Named for: Simón de Anda y Salazar
- Barangays: 21 (see Barangays)

Government
  - Type: Sangguniang Bayan
  - Mayor: Joganie C. Rarang (NP)
  - Vice Mayor: Erwin C. Catabay (NP)
  - Representative: Arthur F. Celeste (NP)
  - Municipal Council: Members: Marvin Charles C. Caranay (NP); Joseph C. Carpo (NP); Reymon C. Rarang (NP); Mary Ann C. Cacho (NP); Reynaldo C. Kiongson (NP); Ronald C. Avelino Jr. (NP); Earl Lawrence E. Quilla (NP); Franchgil C. Mateo (API)
  - Electorate: 26,786 voters (2025)

Area
  - Total: 74.55 km^{2} (28.78 sq mi)
- Elevation: 5.0 m (16.4 ft)
- Highest elevation: 132 m (433 ft)
- Lowest elevation: 0 m (0 ft)

Population (2024 census)
  - Total: 42,688
  - Density: 572.6/km^{2} (1,483/sq mi)
  - Households: 10,588

Economy
  - Income class: 2nd municipal income class
  - Poverty incidence: 15.51% (2023)
  - Revenue: ₱ 231.6 million (2024)
  - Assets: ₱ 734.6 million (2024)
  - Expenditure: ₱ 182.9 million (2024)
  - Liabilities: ₱ 52.2 million (2024)

Service provider
  - Electricity: Pangasinan 1 Electric Cooperative (PANELCO 1)
- Time zone: UTC+8 (PST)
- ZIP code: 2405
- PSGC: 0105505000
- IDD : area code: +63 (0)75
- Native languages: Bolinao; Pangasinan; Ilocano; Tagalog
- Website: www.andapangasinan.gov.ph

Anda, officially the Municipality of Anda (Bolinao: Babali nin Anda; Pangasinan: Baley na Anda; Ilocano: Ili ti Anda; Tagalog: Bayan ng Anda), is a municipality in the province of Pangasinan, Philippines. It is primarily situated on Cabarruyan Island. According to the 2024 census, it has a population of 42,688 people.

Once a part of the municipality of Bolinao, the town consists of a group of islands on the northwest portion of the Lingayen Gulf.

== History ==
Before the middle of the nineteenth century, the islands that compose the municipality were uninhabited. Only occasionally did seafarers and fishermen use the coast as safe havens.

Andres de la Cruz Cacho, fondly called in Bolinao as Andales Kulayo, discovered a vast tract of land suitable for grazing and fertile lowlands, and an abundant spring for agriculture. It was he who brought families from the town of Bolinao aboard a big boat and dispersed them on the island of Cabarruyan in 1842. The settlers rapidly spread across the island.

On May 10, 1842, the pioneers landed on what is now the barrio of Dolaoan, put up a settlement, and chose San Miguel Arcangel as their patron saint. On May 25, 1842, they established Carot and Cabungan, with Santa Lucia as the common patroness of the two settlements. Later, on June 1, 1842, Tondol was founded. Sablig and Macaleeng were settled later that month.

No family was willing to stay in Toritori at the time and so the place was bypassed. The settlers proceeded to Awile and Aruab (now Roxas) and by early July, they have established settlements in the area. By August, Mal-Ong, Awag, Santa Rita, and San Nicolas were established. Within a period of only four months - from May to August 1842 - the whole island of Cabarruyan was populated. A steady stream of settlers followed the first pioneers and soon within a few years, the population was large enough to form a municipality.

In January 1849, a conference of leaders was called by Don Pablo Cacho Valerio through his son Don Domingo with the end in view to establish a new town. The leaders drafted a petition for the creation of a new town and sent copies to Don Jose Sanchez y Guerrero, the then Alcalde at Iba, Zambales and to the Archbishop of Manila on March 15, 1849.

On May 26, 1849, the Alcalde brought the reply granting the petition. Accompanied by the Parish Priest, Rev. Fr. Juan Migrano, Capitan Felipe Cacho Valerio, and other municipal officials of Bolinao, the Alcalde came to Cabarruyan to choose a suitable location for the town site. They agreed on Segat in the center of the island which is now known as Namagbagan. The site for the plaza, church, town hall, convent, cemetery, and streets were laid out on January 20, 1850, by order of the Alcalde.

On October 15, 1903, by virtue of Act No. 945, entitled “An Act Reducing the Twenty-five Municipalities of the Province of Zambales to Fifteen,” while still part of the Province of Zambales, the municipality of Anda retained its existing boundaries.

On November 30, 1903, by virtue of Act No. 1004, the municipalities of Bolinao, Alaminos, San Isidro (Burgos), and Infanta were annexed to the Province of Pangasinan.

On December 19, 1903, by virtue of Act No. 1029, Act No. 1004 was amended to include the municipalities of Anda, Bani, and Agno among those annexed to the Province of Pangasinan.

== Geography ==
The Municipality of Anda consists primarily of Cabarruyan Island (also known as Anda Island), as well as minor surrounding islets. Because of Anda's proximity near the Hundred Islands, a popular tourist destination for its caves and beaches, it is the so-called "Mother of the Hundred Islands."

Anda is situated 74.20 kilometres (46.11 mi) from the provincial capital Lingayen, and 283.14 kilometres (175.94 mi) from the country's capital city of Manila.

=== Barangays ===
Anda is politically subdivided into 18 barangays. Each barangay consists of puroks and some have sitios.

- Awile
- Awag
- Batiarao
- Cabungan
- Carot
- Dolaoan
- Imbo
- Macaleeng
- Macando-candong
- Mal-ong
- Namagbagan
- Poblacion
- Roxas
- Sablig
- San Jose
- Siapar
- Tondol
- Tori-tori

=== Climate ===
Climate data for Anda, Pangasinan
| Month | Jan | Feb | Mar | Apr | May | Jun | Jul | Aug | Sep | Oct | Nov | Dec | Year |
|---|---|---|---|---|---|---|---|---|---|---|---|---|---|
| Mean daily maximum °C (°F) | 31 (88) | 31 (88) | 31 (88) | 33 (91) | 32 (90) | 32 (90) | 30 (86) | 30 (86) | 30 (86) | 31 (88) | 31 (88) | 31 (88) | 31 (88) |
| Mean daily minimum °C (°F) | 21 (70) | 21 (70) | 22 (72) | 24 (75) | 24 (75) | 24 (75) | 23 (73) | 23 (73) | 23 (73) | 23 (73) | 23 (73) | 22 (72) | 23 (73) |
| Average precipitation mm (inches) | 5.1 (0.20) | 11.6 (0.46) | 21.1 (0.83) | 27.7 (1.09) | 232.9 (9.17) | 350.8 (13.81) | 679.8 (26.76) | 733.1 (28.86) | 505 (19.9) | 176.6 (6.95) | 67.2 (2.65) | 17.7 (0.70) | 2,828.6 (111.38) |
| Average rainy days | 3 | 3 | 3 | 4 | 14 | 18 | 23 | 25 | 22 | 15 | 8 | 4 | 142 |
Source: World Weather Online

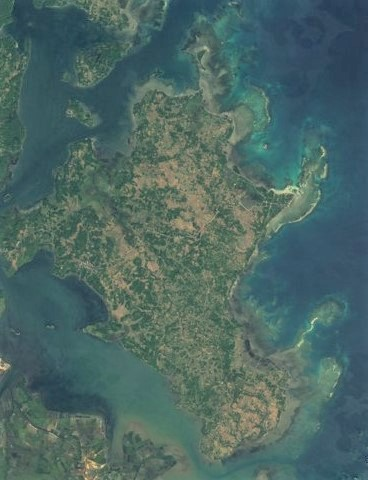
Cabarruyan island satellite image captured by Sentinel-2 in 2016

== Demographics ==
Population census of Anda
| Year | Pop. | ±% p.a. |
|---|---|---|
| 1903 | 3,916 | — |
| 1918 | 6,403 | +3.33% |
| 1939 | 8,989 | +1.63% |
| 1948 | 11,213 | +2.49% |
| 1960 | 14,580 | +2.21% |
| 1970 | 16,917 | +1.50% |
| 1975 | 19,262 | +2.64% |
| 1980 | 20,454 | +1.21% |
| 1990 | 26,856 | +2.76% |
| 1995 | 28,739 | +1.28% |
| 2000 | 32,833 | +2.90% |
| 2007 | 34,398 | +0.64% |
| 2010 | 37,011 | +2.70% |
| 2015 | 39,504 | +1.25% |
| 2020 | 41,548 | +1.07% |
| 2024 | 42,688 | +0.65% |
Source: Philippine Statistics Authority

=== Language ===
The people of Anda generally speak Pangasinan, Bolinao, and Ilocano. Unique in this part of the province, the Sambalic language of Bolinao or Binubolinao is primarily spoken in the municipality and the adjacent town of Bolinao.

== Economy ==
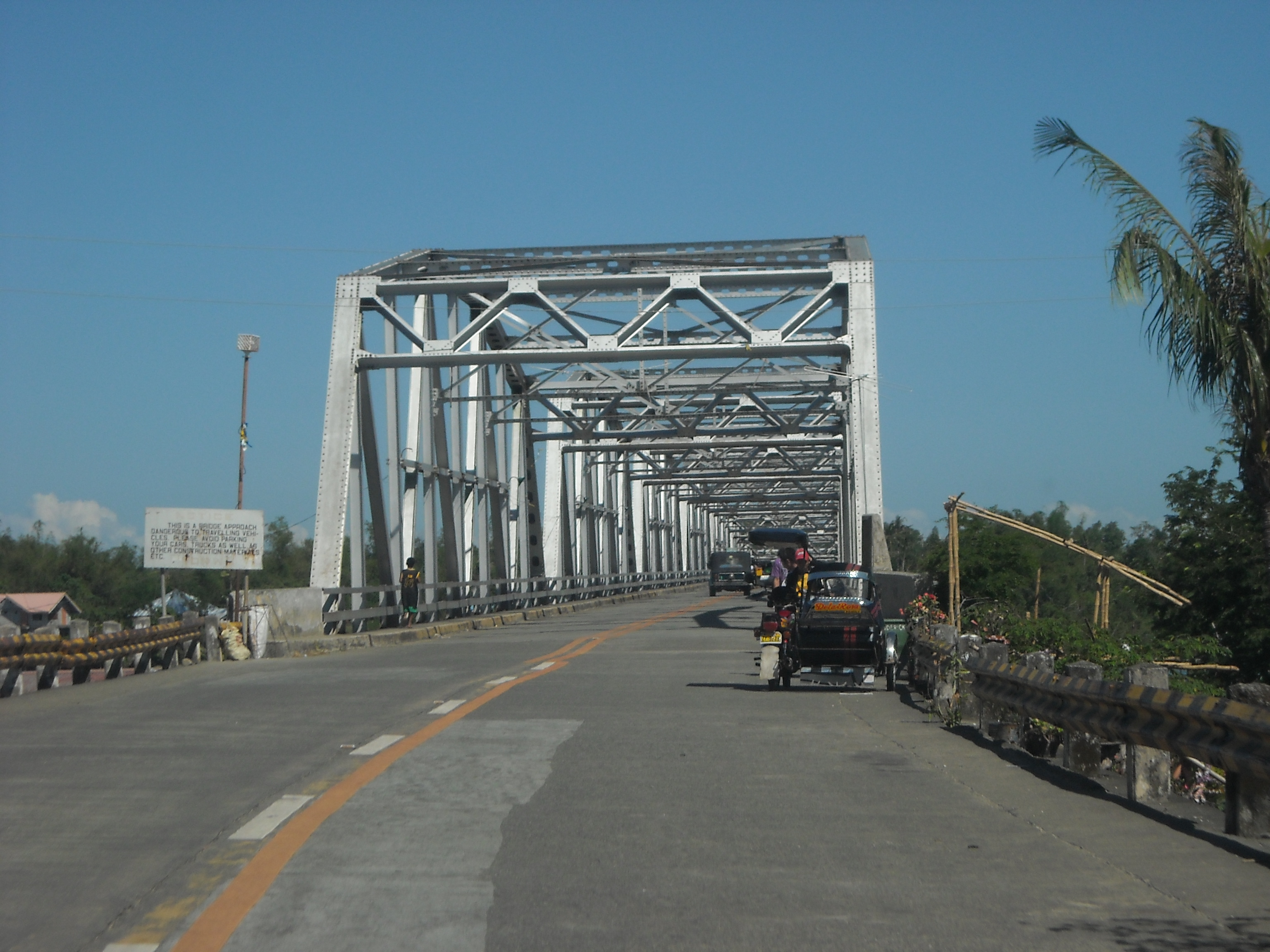
Anda Bridge

Poverty incidence of Anda

Source: Philippine Statistics Authority

The town thrives on farming and deep-sea fishing.

In the past, progress in the town was sluggish due to its dependence to a landing barge to cross the Catubig Channel separating Anda to mainland Bolinao. In 1996, trade has increased due to a bridge connecting the municipality to the mainland. This bridge, known as Anda Bridge, was sponsored and inaugurated by then President Fidel V. Ramos, who hails from Pangasinan. Main roads have been concreted for faster access to the barangays, especially tourism related places.

== Government ==
=== Local government ===
Anda, belonging to the first congressional district of the province of Pangasinan, is governed by a mayor designated as its local chief executive and by a municipal council as its legislative body in accordance with the Local Government Code. The mayor, vice mayor, and the councilors are elected directly by the people through an election which is being held every three years.

=== Elected officials ===
Members of the Anda Municipal Government (2025-2028)
| Position | Name |
|---|---|
| Congressman | Arthur F. Celeste (NP) |
| Municipal Mayor | Joganie C. Rarang (NP) |
| Municipal Vice-Mayor | Erwin C. Catabay (NP) |
| Municipal Councilors | Marvin Charles C. Caranay (NP) |
| Municipal Councilors | Joseph C. Carpo (NP) |
| Municipal Councilors | Reymon C. Rarang (NP) |
| Municipal Councilors | Mary Ann C. Cacho (NP) |
| Municipal Councilors | Reynaldo C. Kiongson (NP) |
| Municipal Councilors | Ronald C. Avelino Jr. (NP) |
| Municipal Councilors | Earl Lawrence E. Quilla (NP) |
| Municipal Councilors | Franchgil C. Mateo (API) |

== Transportation ==
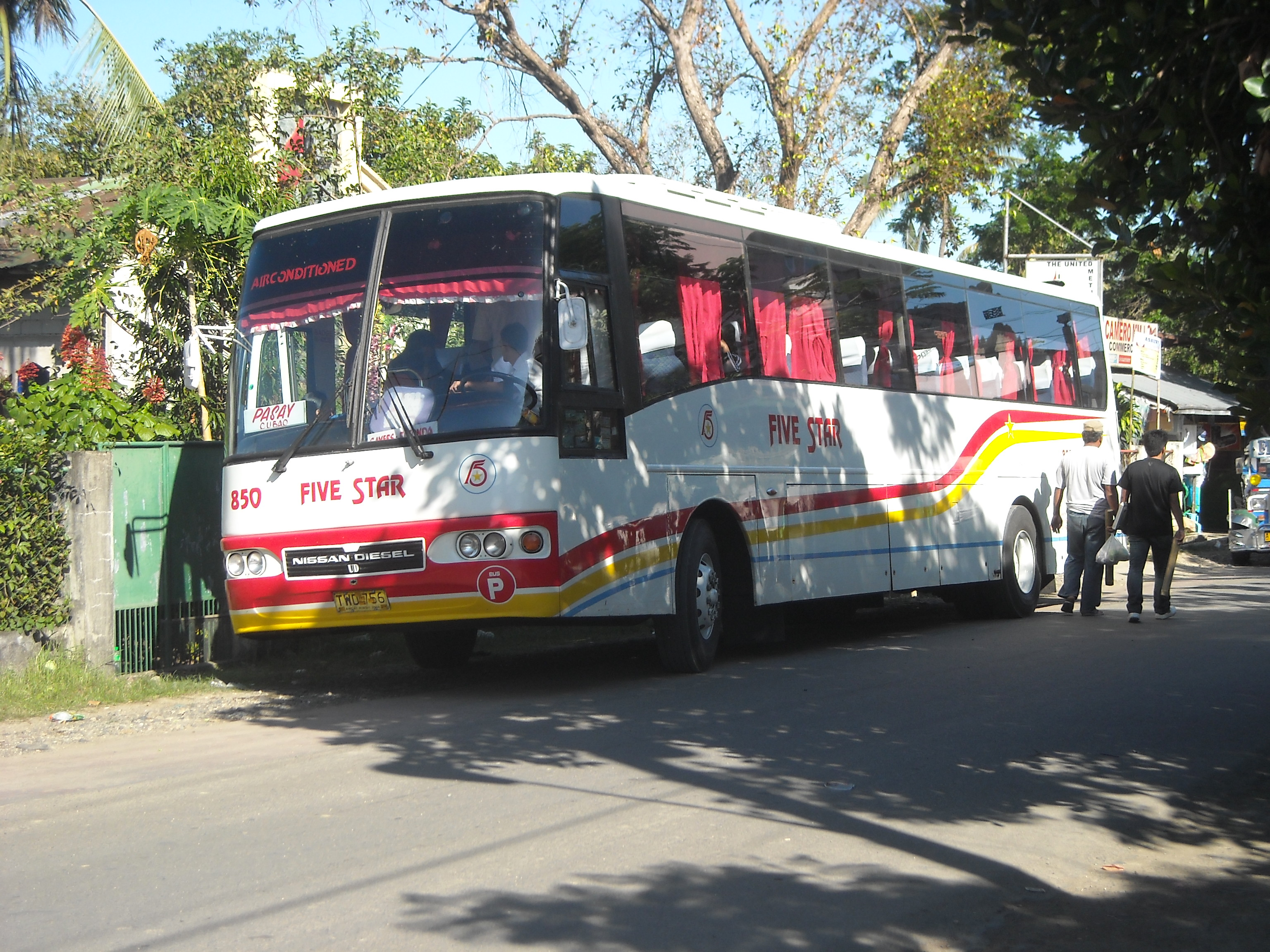
A Five Star bus in the municipality.

The town is accessible through land transportation. Two main bus companies serve commuters to and from Anda to Manila or neighboring towns and cities. These are Dagupan Bus Co., Inc.and Pangasinan Five Star Bus Co. Mini buses and jeepneys are also available for commuters going to neighboring towns and cities, like Alaminos and Dagupan.

== Fossil Finds ==
In the year 2000, fossils were found in barangay San Jose and barangay Awile. Fossils in barangay Awile were found only a few centimeters from the surface due to extensive erosion in the area. In San Jose, the fossils were discovered 3 meters from the ground surface. Most of the fossils were found in clay layer with limestone rubbles.

Among the faunal fossils discovered were from Stegodon sp., Elephas sp (large)., Elephas beyeri Von Koenigsvald (dwarf), Rhinoceros philippinensis, Cerpis sp. and Bovid sp.

== Education ==
The Anda Schools District Office governs all educational institutions within the municipality. It oversees the management and operations of all private and public elementary and high schools.

=== Primary and elementary schools ===
- Anda Central UMC Kiddie Learning Center
- Aruab Elementary School
- Awile Elementary School
- Batiarao Elementary School
- Cabungan Elementary School
- Caniogan Elementary School
- Carot Elementary School
- Dolaoan Elementary School
- Imbo Elementary School
- Macaleeng Elementary School
- Macandocandong Elementary School
- Mal-Ong Elementary School
- Marempey Elementary School
- Namagbagan Elementary School
- Sablig Elementary School
- San Jose Elementary School
- San Nicolas Elementary School
- Seaside Bible Baptist Learning Center of Anda
- Siapar Integrated
- St. Nicholas Catholic School of Anda
- Tondol Elementary School
- Toritori Elementary School

=== Secondary schools ===
- Anda Integrated School
- Anda National High School
- Awag Integrated School
- Cabungan National High School
- Carot National High School
- Macaleeng National High School
- San Jose National High School (Anda)
- Tondol National High School

=== Higher educational institution ===
- Asbury College

== See also ==
- List of islands of the Philippines
