= Mariveleño language =

Austronesian language spoken in the Philippines

Mariveleño
- Bataan Ayta, Magbukun Ayta
- Native to: Philippines
- Region: Mariveles
- Ethnicity: 2,000 (2011)
- Native speakers: 1,000 (2011)
- Language family: Austronesian: Malayo-Polynesian; Philippine; Central Luzon; Sambalic; Mariveleño

Language codes
- ISO 639-3: ayt
- Glottolog: bata1297
- ELP: Bataan Ayta

Mariveleño (also known as Magbikin, Bataan Ayta, or Magbukun Ayta) is a Sambalic language. It has around 500 speakers (Wurm 2000) and is spoken within an Aeta community in Mariveles in the Philippines.

== Geographic distribution ==
Reid (1994) reports the following Magbikin locations.

- Kanáwon, Morong, Bataan
- Bayanbayanan, Magbikin, Mariveles, Bataan

Himes (2012: 491) also collected Magbukun data from the two locations of:

- Biaan, Mariveles, Bataan
- Canawan, Morong, Bataan

Cabanding (2014), citing Neil (2012), reports the following Magbukon locations in Bataan Province.

- Dangcol, Balanga, Bataan
- Kinaragan, Limay, Bataan
- Kanawan, Morong, Bataan
- Pita, Bayan-bayanan in Orion, Bataan
- Pag-asa, Orani, Bataan
- Ulingan, Matanglaw, and Magduhat (all in Bagac, Bataan)
- Sitio Luoban in Samal, Bataan
- Bangkal in Abucay, Bataan

== See also ==
- Languages of the Philippines
