= Zambales (disambiguation) =

Zambales may refer to:

- Zambales Province
- Zambales Mountains
- Sambal people
