= Columban College =

Roman Catholic college in Olongapo, Philippines

- Dalubhasaang Columban (Filipino)
- Former name: Naval Reservation Junior College (1950–1961)
- Motto: Christi Simus Non Nostri (Latin)
- Motto in English: We Are Christ's Not Our Own
- Type: Private, Roman Catholic Diocesan Coeducational Basic and Higher education institution
- Established: 1961; 65 years ago
- Founder: Missionary Society of St. Columban
- Religious affiliation: Roman Catholic
- Academic affiliations: PAASCU, PACUCOA, CEAP, FAPE
- President: Rev. Fr. Eric dela Cruz
- Principal: Elizabeth L. Hondo (Principal, Basic Education); Segundo Redondo Jr. Ed. D. (Principal, Senior High School); Christine May Torres-Reyman (Principal, Barretto Campus)
- Location: #1 First St., New Asinan, Olongapo City, Zambales, Philippines; 14°51′29″N 120°16′09″E
- Campus: Main Campus #1 First St., New Asinan, Olongapo City: Satellite Campuses *Rizal St. Ext. Bo. Barretto, Olongapo City *Santa Cruz, Zambales
- Alma Mater song: The Columban Hymn
- Colors: Sky blue and white
- Website: columban.edu.ph
- Location in Luzon Location in the Philippines

Columban College (Filipino: Dalubhasaang Columban) is a Catholic basic and higher education institution run by the Roman Catholic Diocese of Iba in Olongapo City, Zambales, Philippines. It was founded in 1961. It is dedicated to serve the educational needs of the city of Olongapo and the provinces of Zambales and Bataan.

== History ==
The institution was first known as Naval Reservation Junior College during the 1950s when it was operated by the Joben Admana family. In 1961 administration of the school was passed on by the Joseph Docena Family to the Columban Fathers.

The first director of Columban College was Rev. Thomas L. Convery SSC with Rev. Fr. Paul O'Malley SSC as his assistant. Columban Sisters were assigned in 1962 to assist in the administrative and teaching workloads in the school. During the same year, the Parish of St. Columban was inaugurated with Fr. O'Malley as its parish priest. In 1965, Fr. Convery was succeeded by Rev. William F. Sullivan, SSC as school director. Rev. Fr. John Curry, SSC took over in 1971, followed by Rev. Fr. Edward McKenna from 1973 to 1975. From 1976 to 1982, Rev. Fr. Richard Cannon SSC was the school director. He was succeeded by Rev. Fr. Vincent Lyons from 1982 to 1983. In 1983, the administration of the college was handed over by the Columban Fathers to the Vincentian Fathers. Rev. Fr. Constancio Gan was appointed school director.

The Daughters of Charity took over when the contract of the Vincentians expired in 1989. Sr. Stella Real D.C. was appointed school directress.

In 1993, the Roman Catholic Diocese of Iba took over the operation of Columban College. Most Reverend Deogracias Iniquez Jr. bishop of the Diocese of Iba, as head of the diocesan schools, took over the administration of Columban College. Like in any diocesan school, the director of an institution comes from the diocesan clergy assigned in the diocese in Iba.

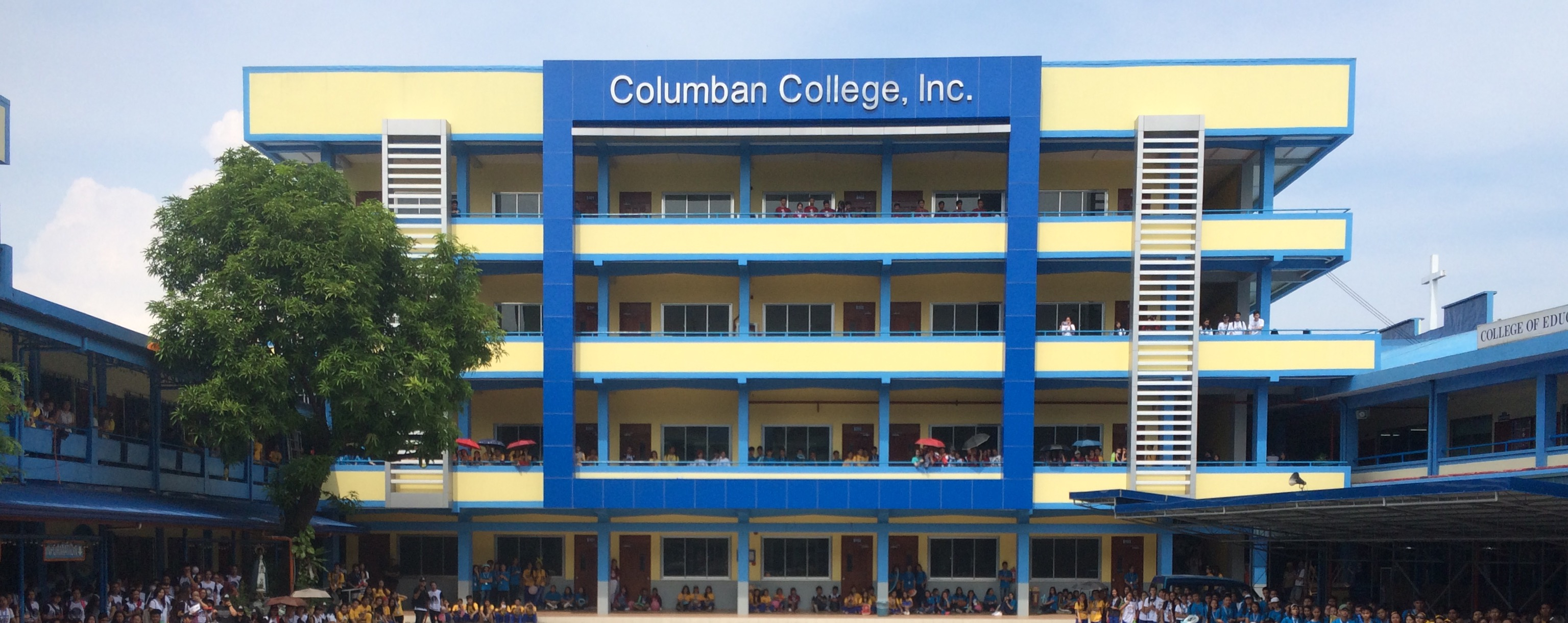
Bishop Henry Byrne Building

Bishop Daniel O. Presto (Rev. Fr. Daniel O. Presto back then) was appointed as school director in 1993 and later became the first school president until October 2005. He was succeeded by Rev. Fr. Roland M. Almo and then by Very Rev. Msgr. Crisostomo A. Cacho, until June 16, 2020, as the school president. Then Rev. Fr. Raymann G. Catindig was assigned as school president on June 17, 2020.

=== The School Seal ===
The school seal bears the Celtic cross surrounded by the name of the school. Across it is St. Columban's motto: "Christi Simus Non Nostri" or "We are Christ's Not Our Own." The Celtic cross is sometimes called the wheel cross because of the circle at the center connecting the beams. The circle is a symbol for God who unites all men in His love. The cross represents Jesus Christ, the Son of God, who is the foundation of Christian Life.

== Notable people ==
- Alexandra Faith Garcia – Triathlete – Ironman 70.3
- Derek Q. Manuel – Businessman – Ayala Malls
- Marco Estabillo – Deputy Administrator – Subic Bay Metropolitan Authority
- Cynthia C. Paulino – First Lady – Olongapo City
- Angelee delos Reyes - Miss Philippines Earth 2013
- Melissa Mendez - Filipino film and TV actress
- Lt. Gen. Roy Deveraturda (ret) - Former Chief of the Palawan-based AFP Western Command (WESCOM)
- Lei Alviz - TV Personality, Reporter, Anchor, Journalist, Producer
