= Zambales Provincial Building =

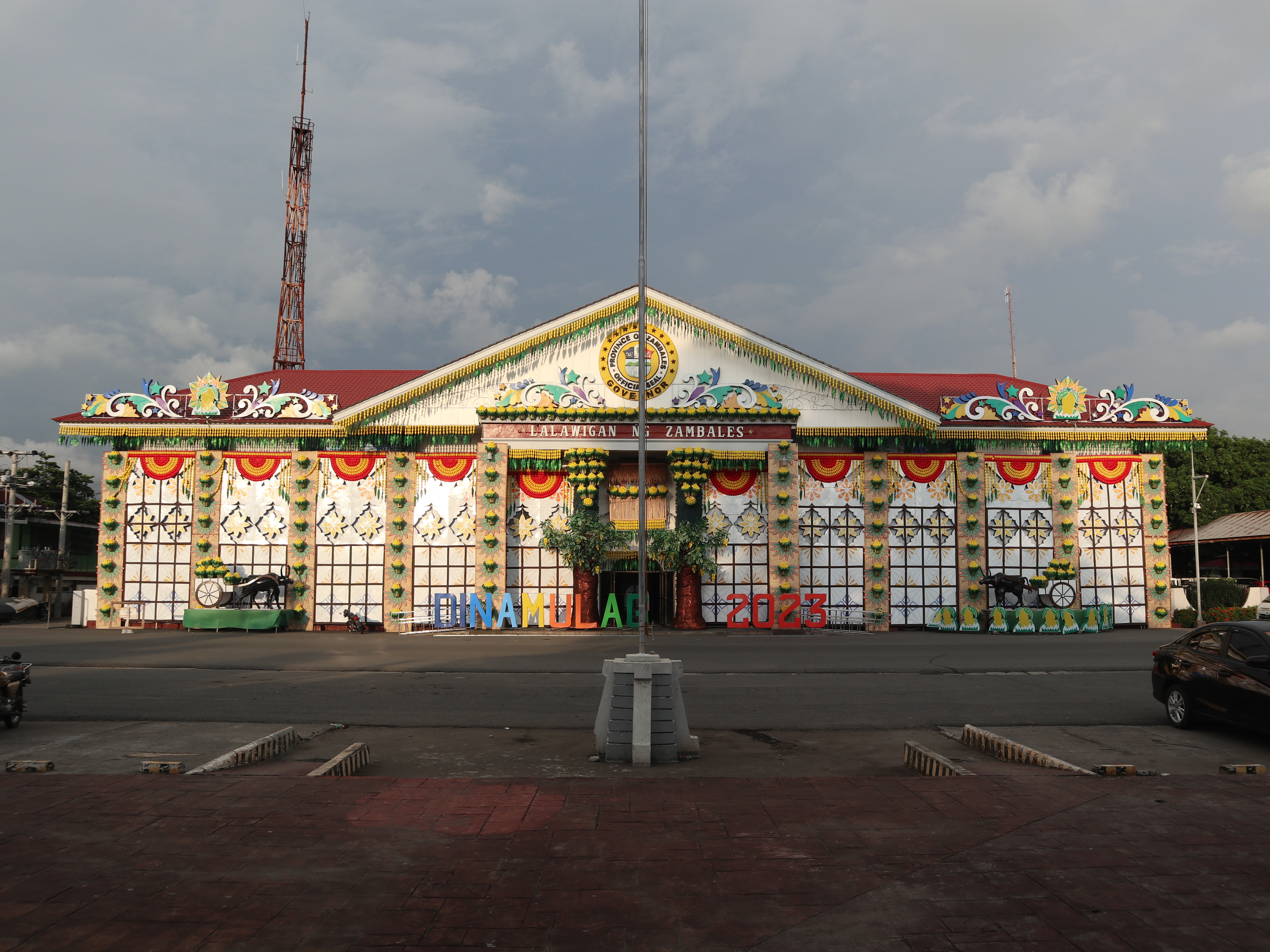
- Facade of Zambales Provincial Capitol
- Interactive map of the Zambales Provincial Building area
- Alternative names: Zambales Provincial Capitol

General information
- Location: Iba, Zambales, Philippines
- Coordinates: 15°19′33″N 119°58′52″E
- Construction started: 1875
- Completed: 1878

National Historical Landmarks
- Designated: 1939

The Zambales Provincial Building or Zambales Provincial Capitol is the seat of the provincial government of Zambales in the Philippines.

The original building was constructed by the Spanish colonial government from 1875 to 1878. It was used as a prison and later as the general headquarters of the revolutionary government of Zambales in 1899. The existing building is a two-storey structure that was renovated in 1979.

== Present situation ==
The building houses the administrative and financial offices of the provincial government. The legislative department had since moved out from the capitol building in 2021.

In 2023, the provincial government announced that a new capitol building will be built right across the existing provincial capitol to replace it. The new capitol building will have four stories and cost 500 million pesos.

== Recognition ==
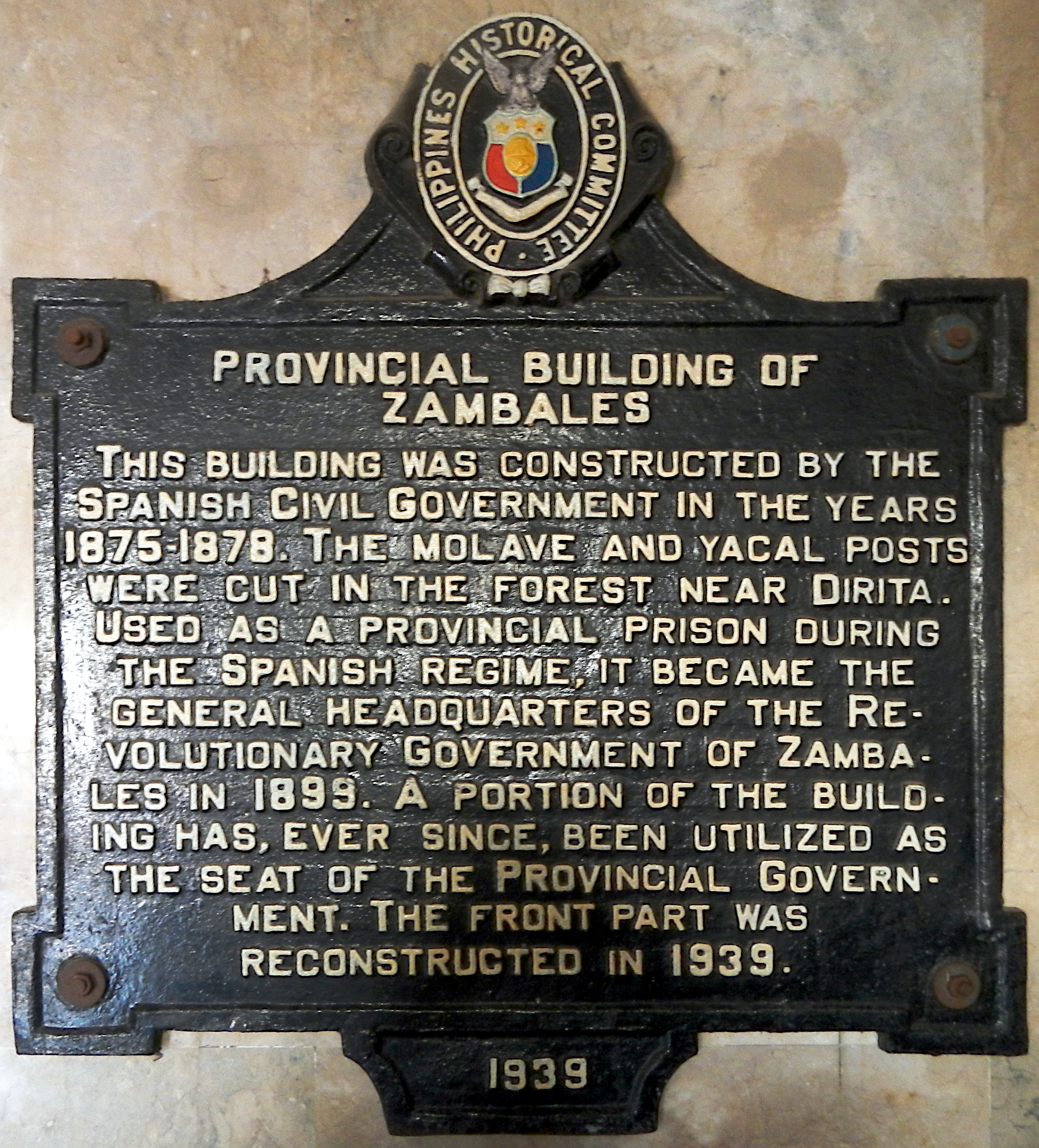
National Historical Commission of the Philippines historical marker

In 1939, the Philippines Historical Committee, a predecessor of the National Historical Commission of the Philippines, recognized the provincial building as a historical structure by installing a historical marker.
