= Santa Cruz Academy =

Roman Catholic high school in Zambales, Philippines

Coordinates: 15°45′43″N 119°54′36″E

The Santa Cruz Academy, Inc. (SCA) is a Catholic high school located in Santa Cruz, Zambales, Philippines. It was established in 1926 as Western Luzon Academy, changing its name to Santa Cruz Academy in 1936. It is a parochial school under St. Michael the Archangel Parish headed by the parish priest. Ms. Marites Merza is the new school principal after Mrs.Dedima O. Misola finished her term. The Academy is a Department of Education accredited private school.

In May 2008 the school was used as an evacuation centre for residents displaced by tropical storm Cosme.
