= Santa Cruz, Zambales =

Municipality in Zambales, Philippines

Santa Cruz Sigayan
- Municipality
- Municipality of Santa Cruz
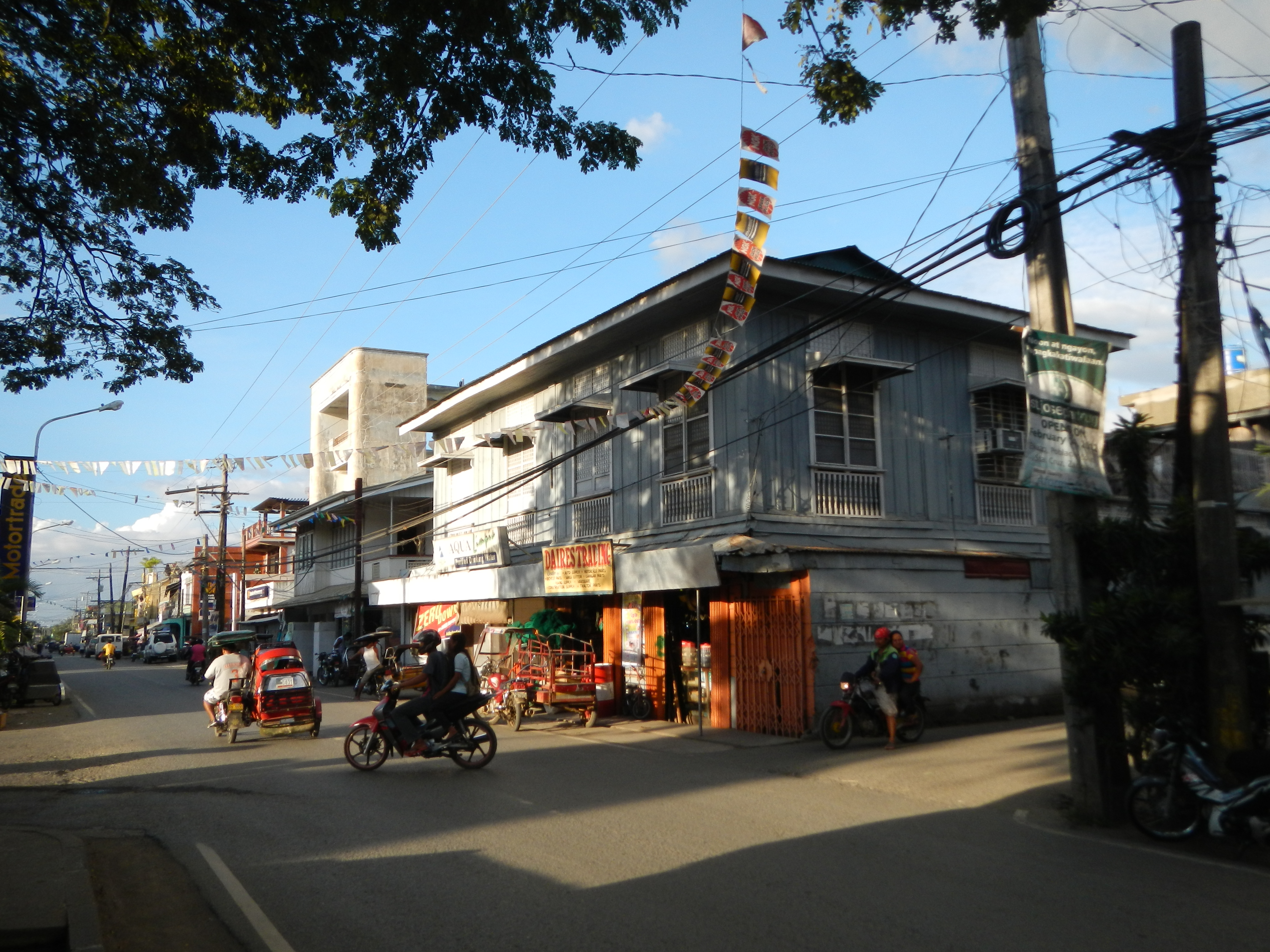
- Santa Cruz proper

- Seal

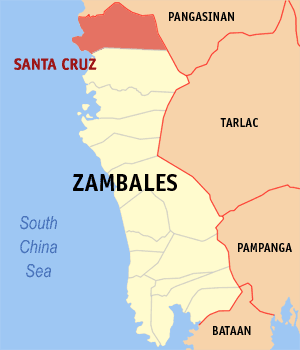
- Map of Zambales with Santa Cruz highlighted
- Interactive map of Santa Cruz
- Location within the Philippines
- Coordinates: 15°46′N 119°55′E
- Country: Philippines
- Region: Central Luzon
- Province: Zambales
- District: 2nd district
- Founded: 1612
- Barangays: 25 (see Barangays)

Government
  - Type: Sangguniang Bayan
  - Mayor: Consolacion M. Marty
  - Vice Mayor: Miguel M. Maniago, Jr.
  - Representative: Doris E. Maniquiz
  - Municipal Council: Members: Maria Veronica G. Matibag; Reina Mae M. Mayor; Danilo M. Merced; Ricky A. Moralejo; Sarah Jane E. Menor; Zenaida M. Mayor; Felmar M. Movilla; Rolando M. Mercurio
  - Electorate: 43,102 voters (2025)

Area
  - Total: 438.46 km^{2} (169.29 sq mi)
- Elevation: 11 m (36 ft)
- Highest elevation: 107 m (351 ft)
- Lowest elevation: 0 m (0 ft)

Population (2024 census)
  - Total: 66,647
  - Density: 152.00/km^{2} (393.68/sq mi)
  - Households: 16,033

Economy
  - Income class: 1st municipal income class
  - Poverty incidence: 16.35% (2023)
  - Revenue: ₱ 493.8 million (2024)
  - Assets: ₱ 1,560 million (2024)
  - Expenditure: ₱ 412.9 million (2024)
  - Liabilities: ₱ 623.4 million (2024)

Service provider
  - Electricity: Zambales 1 Electric Cooperative (ZAMECO 1)
- Time zone: UTC+8 (PST)
- ZIP code: 2213
- PSGC: 0307113000
- IDD : area code: +63 (0)47
- Native languages: Sambal; Ilocano; Tagalog

Santa Cruz, officially the Municipality of Santa Cruz (Sambal: Babali nin Santa Cruz; Ilocano: Ili ti Santa Cruz; Filipino: Bayan ng Santa Cruz), is a municipality in the province of Zambales, Philippines. According to the 2024 census, it has a population of 66,647 people.

== Geography ==
Santa Cruz is 136 kilometres (85 mi) from Olongapo, 58 kilometres (36 mi) from Iba, and 262 kilometres (163 mi) from Manila. It is between Candelaria and Infanta, Pangasinan on the Olongapo–Bugallon Road.

=== Barangays ===
Santa Cruz is politically subdivided into 25 barangays, as indicated below. Each barangay consists of puroks and some have sitios.

- Babuyan
- Bangcol
- Bayto
- Biay
- Bolitoc
- Bulawon
- Canaynayan
- Gama
- Guinabon
- Guisguis
- Lipay
- Lomboy
- Lucapon North
- Lucapon South
- Malabago
- Naulo
- Pagatpat
- Pamonoran
- Poblacion North
- Poblacion South
- Sabang
- San Fernando
- Tabalong
- Tubotubo North
- Tubotubo South

=== Climate ===
Climate data for Santa Cruz, Zambales
Month	Jan	Feb	Mar	Apr	May	Jun	Jul	Aug	Sep	Oct	Nov	Dec	Year
Mean daily maximum °C (°F)	30 (86)	32 (90)	33 (91)	34 (93)	32 (90)	31 (88)	30 (86)	29 (84)	29 (84)	30 (86)	31 (88)	30 (86)	31 (88)
Mean daily minimum °C (°F)	19 (66)	20 (68)	21 (70)	23 (73)	25 (77)	25 (77)	24 (75)	25 (77)	24 (75)	23 (73)	22 (72)	20 (68)	23 (73)
Average precipitation mm (inches)	9 (0.4)	10 (0.4)	16 (0.6)	27 (1.1)	137 (5.4)	183 (7.2)	215 (8.5)	219 (8.6)	190 (7.5)	124 (4.9)	45 (1.8)	18 (0.7)	1,193 (47.1)
Average rainy days	4.6	4.4	6.9	10.3	21.8	25.4	27.2	26.4	25.2	19.7	13.8	7.0	192.7
Source: Meteoblue (modeled/calculated data, not measured locally)

== Demographics ==
Population census of Santa Cruz

Year	Pop.	±% p.a.
1903	5,952	—
1918	8,458	+2.37%
1939	11,194	+1.34%
1948	14,613	+3.01%
1960	20,809	+2.99%
1970	28,282	+3.11%
1975	32,307	+2.70%
1980	35,665	+2.00%

Year	Pop.	±% p.a.
1990	41,273	+1.47%
1995	43,623	+1.04%
2000	49,269	+2.64%
2007	52,202	+0.80%
2010	53,867	+1.15%
2015	58,151	+1.47%
2020	63,839	+1.98%
2024	66,647	+1.04%

Source: Philippine Statistics Authority

In the 2024 census, the population of Santa Cruz was 66,647 people, with a density of 150 inhabitants per square kilometre or 390 inhabitants per square mile.

== Economy ==
Poverty incidence of Santa Cruz (%)

Source: Philippine Statistics Authority

The banking and financial sectors are well developed in this town. Several banks such as Philippine National Bank, Bank of Commerce, BDO Network Bank, and some rural banks are in place, as well as remittance centers including Palawan Pawnshop, Cebuana Luillher, Western Union and LBC Express including other local pawnshops. Convenience store, local department stores, grocery stores and pharmaceutical shops serve the public.

Two cinema houses (the Ebido and Mose) previously served the locals but due to the high availability of recording media from VHS tapes, CDs and DVDs, the cinema houses eventually closed in the 90s.

Cable television services, the PLDT Telephone/Fiber network (previously Digitel) and more recently Converge ICT have been supplemented by the internet.

== Education ==
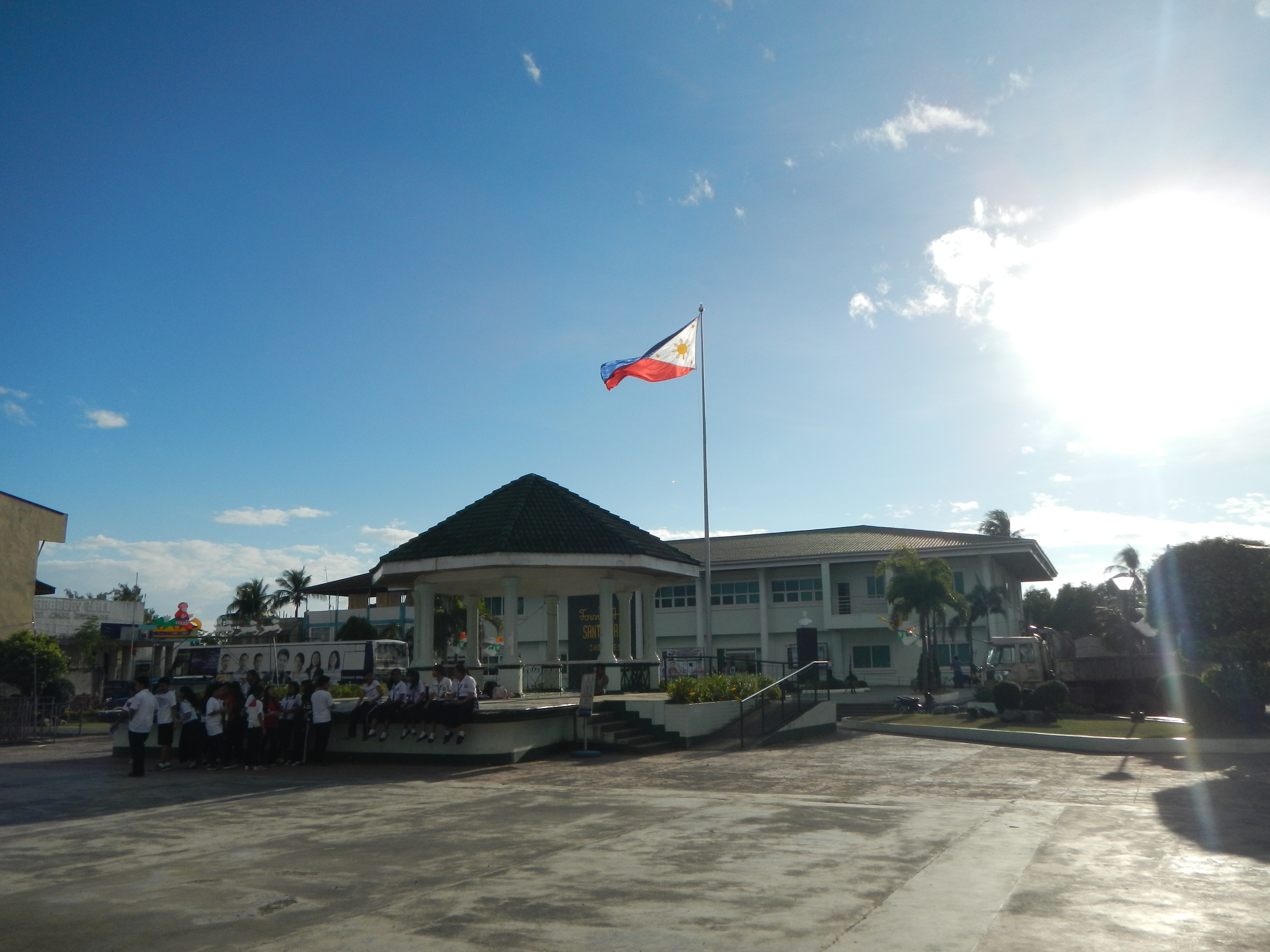
Santa Cruz Town Hall

There are two school districts which govern all educational institutions within the municipality. They oversee the management and operations of all private and public, from primary to secondary schools. These are Santa Cruz North Schools District Office, and Santa Cruz South Schools District Office.

The town has both public and private educational institutions, including those run by religious organizations, foundations and individuals.

=== Primary and elementary schools ===
Santa Cruz has plenty of schools for primary education. Every barangay has its own elementary school, and some also have high school departments.

- Acoje Elementary School
- Almasin Elementary School
- Bangcol Elementary School
- Babuyan Integrated School
- Bayto Integrated School
- Bolitoc Elementary School
- Bolitoc Elementary School (Annex)
- Bulawon Elementary School
- Canaynayan Elementary School
- Children of Zion Montessori School
- Don Marcelo C. Marty Elementary School
- Gama Elementary School
- Guinabon Elementary School
- Guisguis Elementary School
- Lucapon South Elementary School
- Lupa Elementary School
- Malabago Elementary School
- Mapalad Elementary School
- Naulo Elementary School
- Pagatpat Elementary School
- Pamonoran Elementary School
- Pecson Memorial Elementary School
- Sabang Elementary School
- San Fernando Elementary School
- St. Michael School
- Sta. Cruz North Central School
- Sta. Cruz South Central School
- Tabalong Elementary School
- Tubotubo Elementary School

St. Michael School is a private school that caters preparatory, elementary, and secondary education. Children of Zion Montessori School is a private school that caters preparatory up to elementary.

=== Secondary schools ===
- Santa Cruz National High School
- Santa Cruz South High School
- Acoje National High School
- Bayto Integrated School
- Guisguis National High School
- Mena Memorial National High School
- Don Marcelo C. Marty High School
- Lipay National High School
- San Fernando High School
- Babuyan Integrated School
- Don Brigido Miraflor Integrated School
- Santa Cruz Academy
- St. Michael School

Santa Cruz Academy is a parochial secondary school operated and controlled by St. Michael the Archangel Parish of Santa Cruz. The Santa Cruz High School is operated by the local government alongside Lipay High School, Santa Cruz South High School, Don Marcelo Marty High School, San Fernando High School, Acoje Mines High School, Mena Memorial Higj School and Guisguis National High School.

=== Higher educational institutions ===
- The President Ramon Magsaysay State University (PRMSU) Sta Cruz Campus is part of the PRMSU system operating in the whole of Zambales Province, offering undergraduate and graduate degrees in teaching and other courses.
- Columban College - Santa Cruz campus is part of the Columban College System controlled by the Roman Catholic Diocese of Iba, headed by the Bishop of Diocese of Iba.
- Micro Asia College of Science and Technology - Santa Cruz campus offers primary, junior and senior high school, and college degrees in computer science and computer engineering, as well as TESDA courses.
