= Sambal people =

Filipino ethnolinguistic group

Sambal
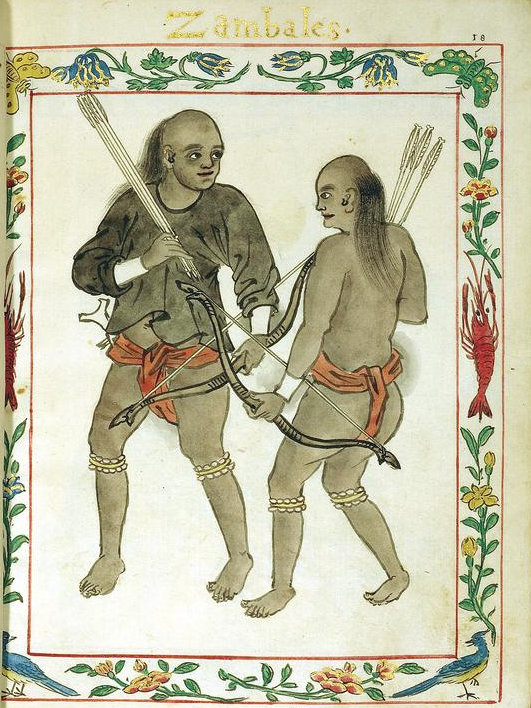

Regions with significant populations
- Zambales, Bolinao, Anda, Infanta, Metro Manila, Quezon

Languages
- Sambal, Bolinao, Botolan, Ilocano, Pangasinan, Kapampangan, Tagalog, English

Religion
- Predominantly Catholicism

Related ethnic groups
- Other Filipino ethnic groups

The Sambal people are a Filipino ethnolinguistic group living primarily in the province of Zambales and the Pangasinense municipalities of Bolinao, Anda, and Infanta. The term may also refer to the general inhabitants of Zambales. They were also referred to as the Zambales (singular Zambal) during the Spanish colonial era.

In 1950s, hundreds of Sambal from the northern municipalities of Zambales migrated to and established a settlement in Quezon, Palawan; this settlement was named Panitian. The residents call themselves Palawenyong Sambal (Spanish: zambales palaweños) or simply Sambal.

== History ==
The Sambal are the original Austronesian inhabitants of the province of Zambales in the Philippines. They speak varieties of Sambal (Sambal, Sambal Botolan, and Sambal Bolinao). These languages they speak belong to the Sambalic family of languages, which includes the Sambalic Ayta languages (Abellen, Mag-antsi, Mag-indi, Ambala, and Magbeken). Further, belonging to the larger Central Luzon language family, these languages are also related to Kapampangan (primarily spoken in the province of Pampanga and souther Tarlac) and Hatang Kayi (currently spoken in the mountains of Tanay, Rizal and General Nakar, Quezon province). Though Hatang Kayi has been call Sinauna or Sinaunang Tagalog in the literature, it is erroneous and the language is not very closely related to Tagalog, and hence, neither are the languages of the Sambals. Sambal people had once inhabited South Luzon, later being displaced by migrating Tagalog settlers, pushing the original inhabitants northward to the modern province of Zambales, in turn, displacing the Aetas.

The Sambals were known to be militant and fierce fighters, notorious for their bloody raids on Christian settlements. They were described by European writers as being excellent archers who used poison arrows. They were also armed with short spears, a short blade or dagger, and carried large rectangular kalasag shields. Fr. Manuel Buzeta in Diccionario Geográfico, Estadístico, Histórico de las Islas Filipinas (1850) describes the Zambales region during the early Spanish period as being sparsely populated by a small number of Sambal villages, with huge distances between them. Each village had about ten to thirty families and were often at war with other villages. The Sambal were headhunters, with similar headhunting traditions as the Cordillerans. A warrior's status was tied to the number of enemies they had killed. They kept a collection of heads or skulls to indicate this, which is also represented by certain ornaments worn on the body. When a person dies by violent or natural means, the immediate male relatives would wear a strip of black cloth to signify mourning. They would be forbidden from singing, dancing, or participating in festivities until they kill an enemy. Murderers within a community are also punished by death, unless a payment of a certain quantity of gold or silver or slaves is accepted by the family of the deceased.

In the Boxer Codex, they were said to immediately cut off the head of people they kill with a bararao dagger. They then make a crown-shaped incision on the head and remove the brains. The head is kept as a trophy. The Boxer Codex also mentions other customs whose veracity is questionable, including claims that they eat carabao intestines raw, or that only the first and second sons inherit their father's property while the rest are enslaved or sacrificed in a manganito ritual.

The Sambals have been occasionally recruited by Indio commanders (indio was the term used for the Austronesian natives) in campaigns against the Spanish, who then governed the islands. The Sambal were also once known to have captured and enslaved Diego Silang as a child, eventually being ransomed by a Recollect missionary in Zambales.

During the first hundred years of Spanish rule, the Sambal, like most other non-Spanish groups in the Philippines during the colonial era, had their village structures reorganized and were forced into reducciones in order to assimilate them into Spanish cultural norms. They were gradually Christianized by Spanish missionaries, especially after the establishment of Fort Paynauen (Paynaven) in what is now Botolan.

During the colonial period, the Sambals primarily sold valuable timber, which they shipped by indigenous boats to Manila. This trade was often targeted by Moro pirates, contributing to the relative poverty of the province in the 18th and 19th centuries. The sparsely populated valley of the Zambales region was also later settled by migrants, largely from the Ilocos and the Tagalog regions, leading to the modern decline in the Sambal identity and language.

During the 1950s, hundreds of Sambals coming from Candelaria, Santa Cruz, and Masinloc in Zambales migrated to an undeveloped and forested area in southern Palawan. They established a settlement which was later on named Panitian. Like in Masinloc, many residents of Panitian have their last names start with the letter E. Most common last names are Eclarino, Elefane, Echaluse, Echague, Español, Ebuen, Ebilane, Edquid, Escala, Edquilang, Ebueng, Ebuenga, Ebalo, Ejanda, Elacio, Elfa, Eliaso, Elgincolin, Edquibal, Ednalino, Edora, Espinoza, Ecaldre, Eufeminiano, Edilloran, Ermita, and Ecle. Those who came from Santa Cruz have their last names usually begin with the letter M, foremost of which are Misa, Mora, Moraña, Moralde and Meredor. Other common last names of Sambali people are Ángeles, Atrero, Agagas, Hebron, Hitchon, Hermoso, Hermosa, Hermana, and Hermogino. There are now approximately 6,000 Sambals residing in Palawan. Many of the Palawan Sambals have since moved to the provincial capital, Puerto Princesa, settling in Mandaragat and New Buncag, in particular, although a majority still resides in Panitian. These Sambals living in Palawan often learn to speak Cuyonon, Palawano and Tagbanwa with varying levels of fluency, along with their native Sambal language and Tagalog.

== Sambal indigenous religion ==
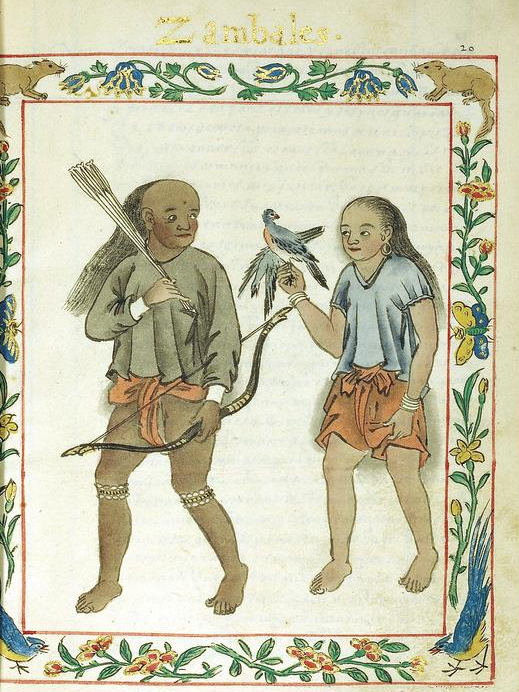
A couple belonging to the Sambal warrior class, documented by the 16th century Boxer Codex. The female warrior is holding a raptor, which has captured a bird, exemplifying a culture of falconry.

The Sambal people have a complex indigenous religion since before Spanish colonization. The highest-ranking shaman was called a bayoc, who consecrated other shamans and led rituals to the spirits. Only the bayoc could lead rituals and offer sacrifices to Malayari or Malyari, the supreme being and the creator deity of the Sambals. Other benevolent spirits were also worshiped who had various functions, mostly agricultural.

=== Immortals ===
- Malayari: also called Apo Namalyari, the supreme deity and creator
- Akasi: the god of health and sickness; sometimes seen at the same level of power as Malayari
- Kayamanan: the goddess of wealth in Sambal mythology; with Kainomayan, she aided a farmer by bringing him good fortune, however, the farmer became greedy; as punishment, she transformed the farmer into a swarm of locusts
- Kainomayan: the goddess of plenty
- Deities in charge of the rice harvest
  - Dumangan: god of good harvest
  - Kalasakas: god of early ripening of rice stalks
  - Kalasokus: god of turning grain yellow and dry
  - Damulag: also called Damolag, god of protecting fruiting rice from the elements
- Manglubar: the god of peaceful living
- Mangalagar: the goddess of good grace
- Aniyun Tauo: the goddess of win and rain who was reduced in rank by Malayari for her conceit
- Apolaqui: personal deity of a priestess

== Language ==
Three Sambalic languages are spoken by the Sambal: Sambali, Bolinao, and Botolan, with approximately 200,000, 105,000 and 72,000 speakers, respectively, based on the 2007 population statistics from the National Statistical Coordination Board (NSCB). The Sambali speakers are the residents of the municipalities of Santa Cruz, Candelaria, Masinloc, Palauig, and the capital town Iba of the province of Zambales & of Infanta & some towns in Pangasinan. The Bolinao subgroup is located in Anda and Bolinao municipalities of Pangasinan, while the Botolan subgroup is found in Botolan and Cabangan municipalities of Zambales. Sambals also speak Kapampangan, Tagalog, Ilocano, and Pangasinense; all those languages spoken in Zambales, while Ilocano, Pangasinense, and Tagalog in Pangasinan. An estimated 6,000 Sambali speakers can also be found in Panitian in Quezon, Palawan, and in Puerto Princesa. They also speak Cuyonon, Palawano and Tagbanwa, along with Tagalog, with varying fluency upon learning them from their native Cuyonon, Palawano and Tagbanwa neighbors.

== See also ==
- Kapampangan people
- Pangasinan people
- Tagalog people
- Ilocano people
- Ivatan people
- Igorot people
- Bicolano people
- Negrito
- Visayan people
  - Cebuano people
    - Boholano people
  - Hiligaynon people
  - Waray people
- Lumad
- Moro people

== See also ==
- Boxer Codex
