= Paynauen Duyan Festival =

- Observed by: Iba, Zambales
- Type: Cultural, Local
- Date: 3rd Week of April

The Paynauen Duyan Festival is an annual festival in the Municipality of Iba, Zambales in the Philippines. The festival was first held in 2005.

== Etymology ==
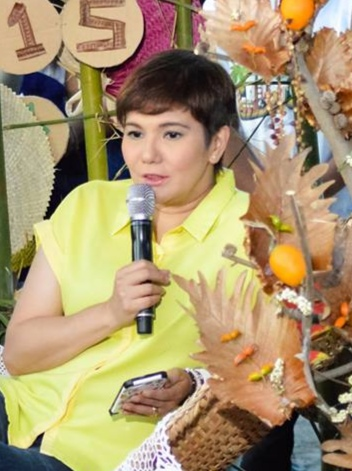
Amy Perez during the telecast of Umagang Kay Ganda

Paynauen a word of Zambal origin, literally means Pahingahan. Duyan is a local name for hammock, a favorite spot for resting and relaxing.

== Events and Highlights ==
- Binibining Paynauen
- Street Dancing and Duyan Parade Competition
- Little Miss Fashionista
- Color My World Fun Run
- Balik Tanaw Exhibit
- Iba Got Talent
