= Zambales =

Province in Central Luzon, Philippines

- Province
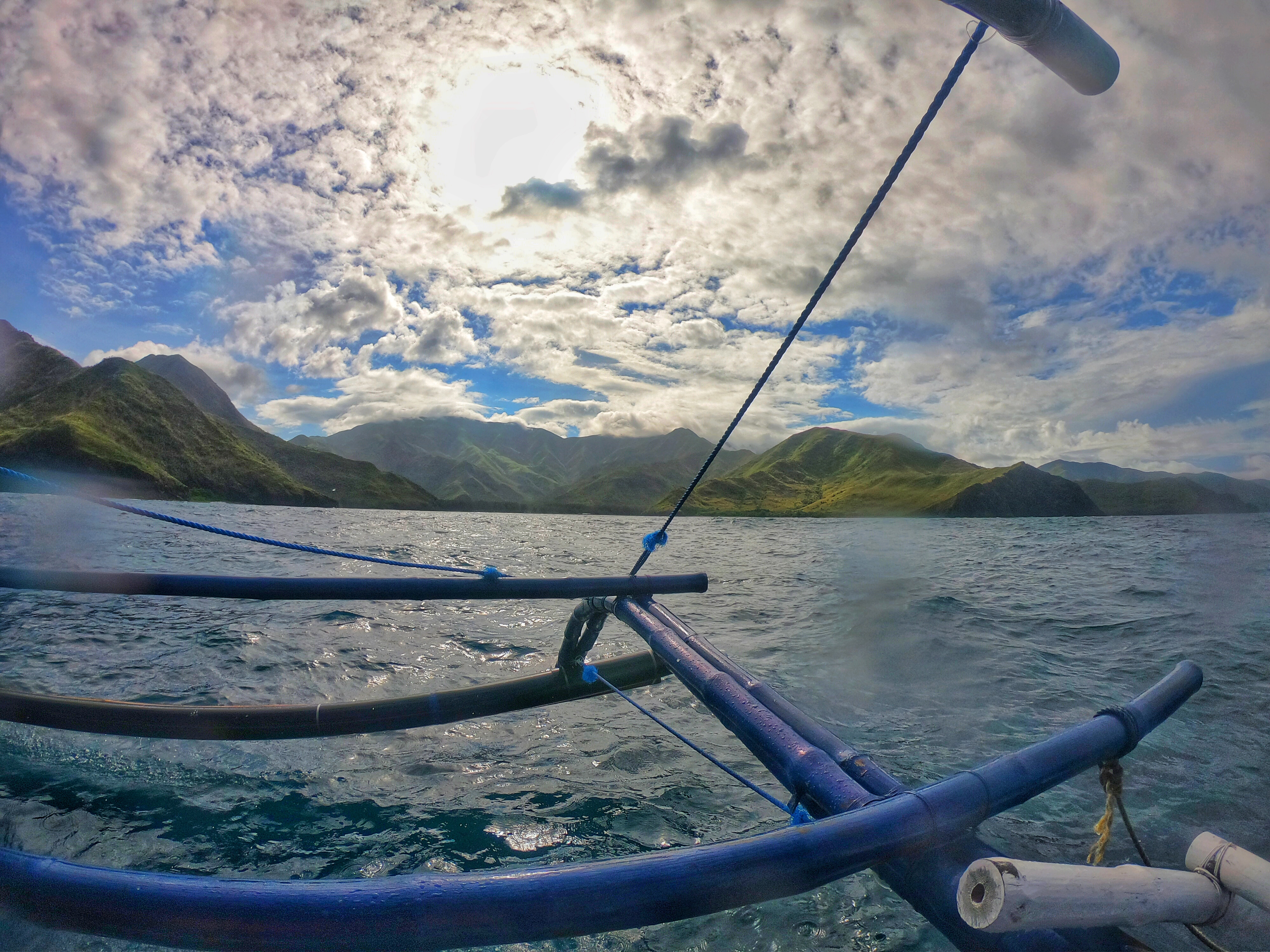
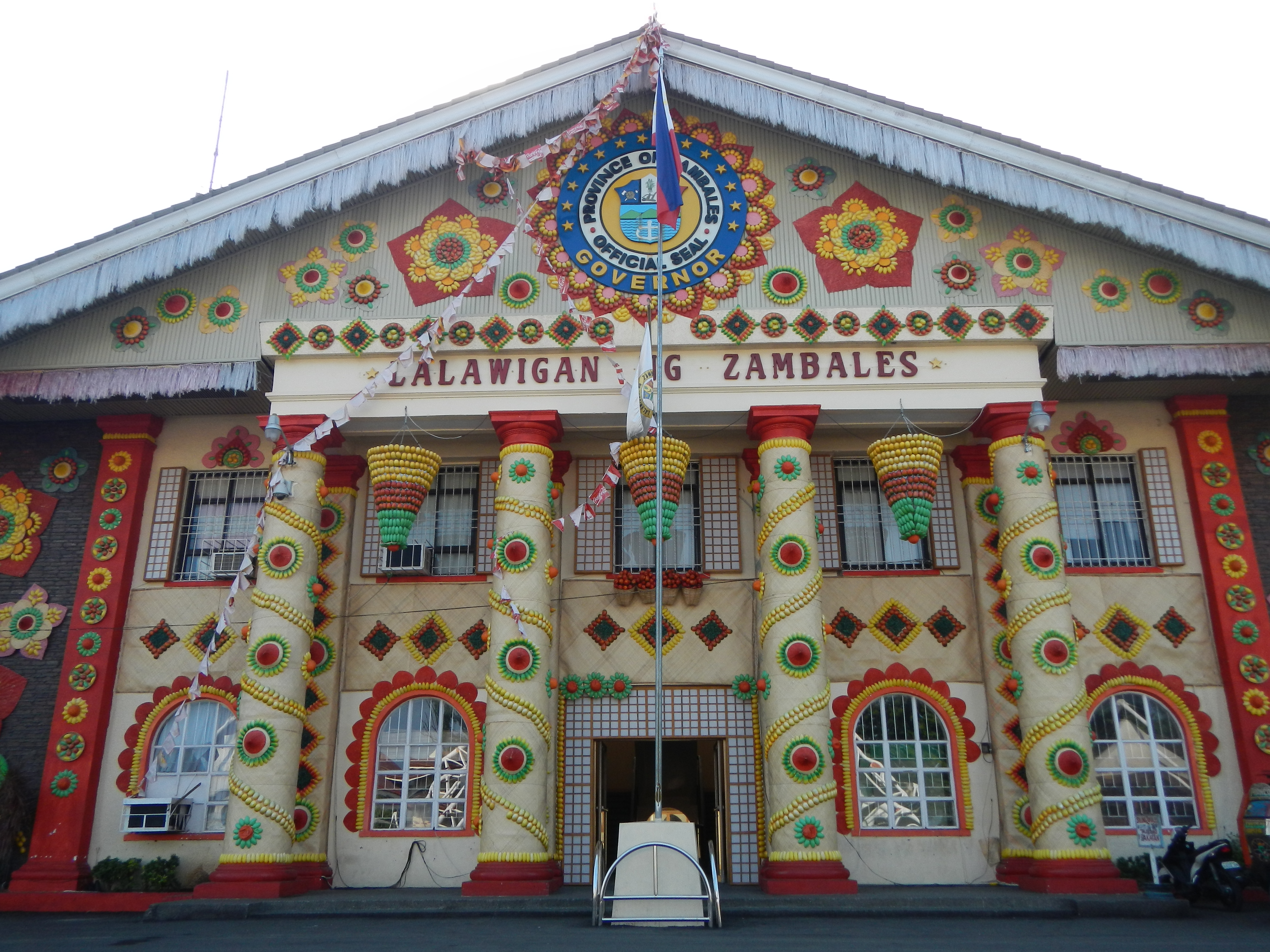
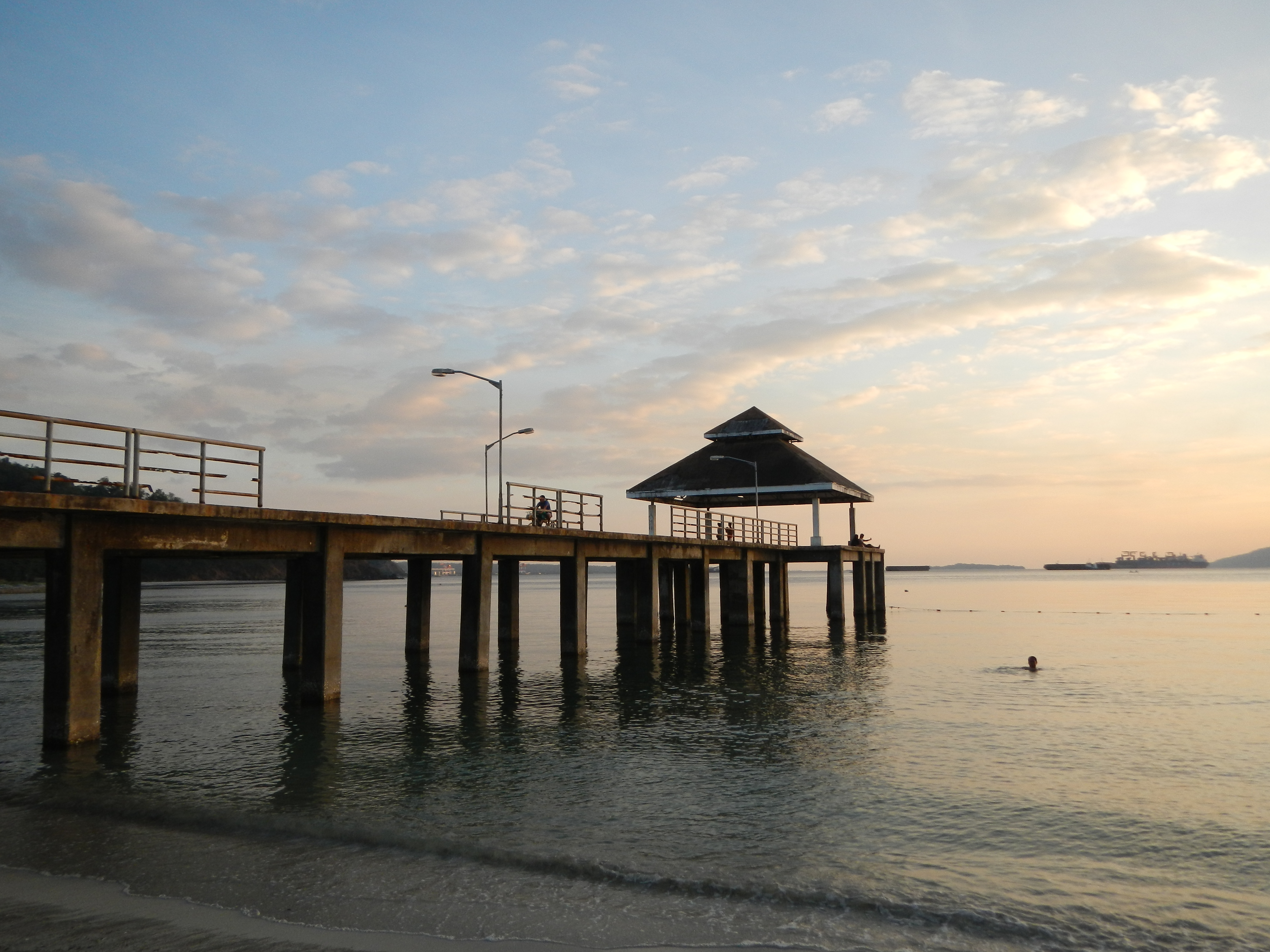
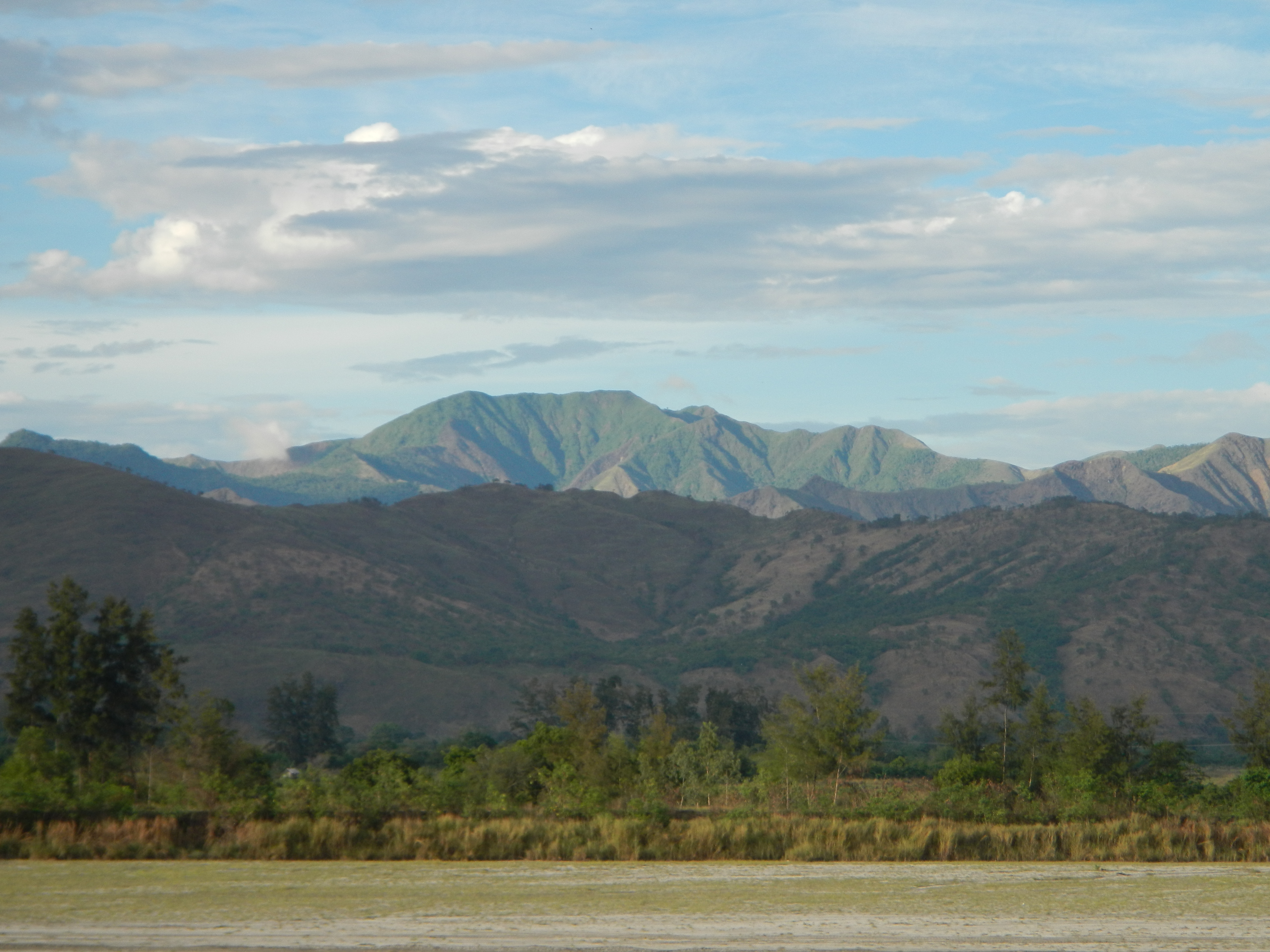
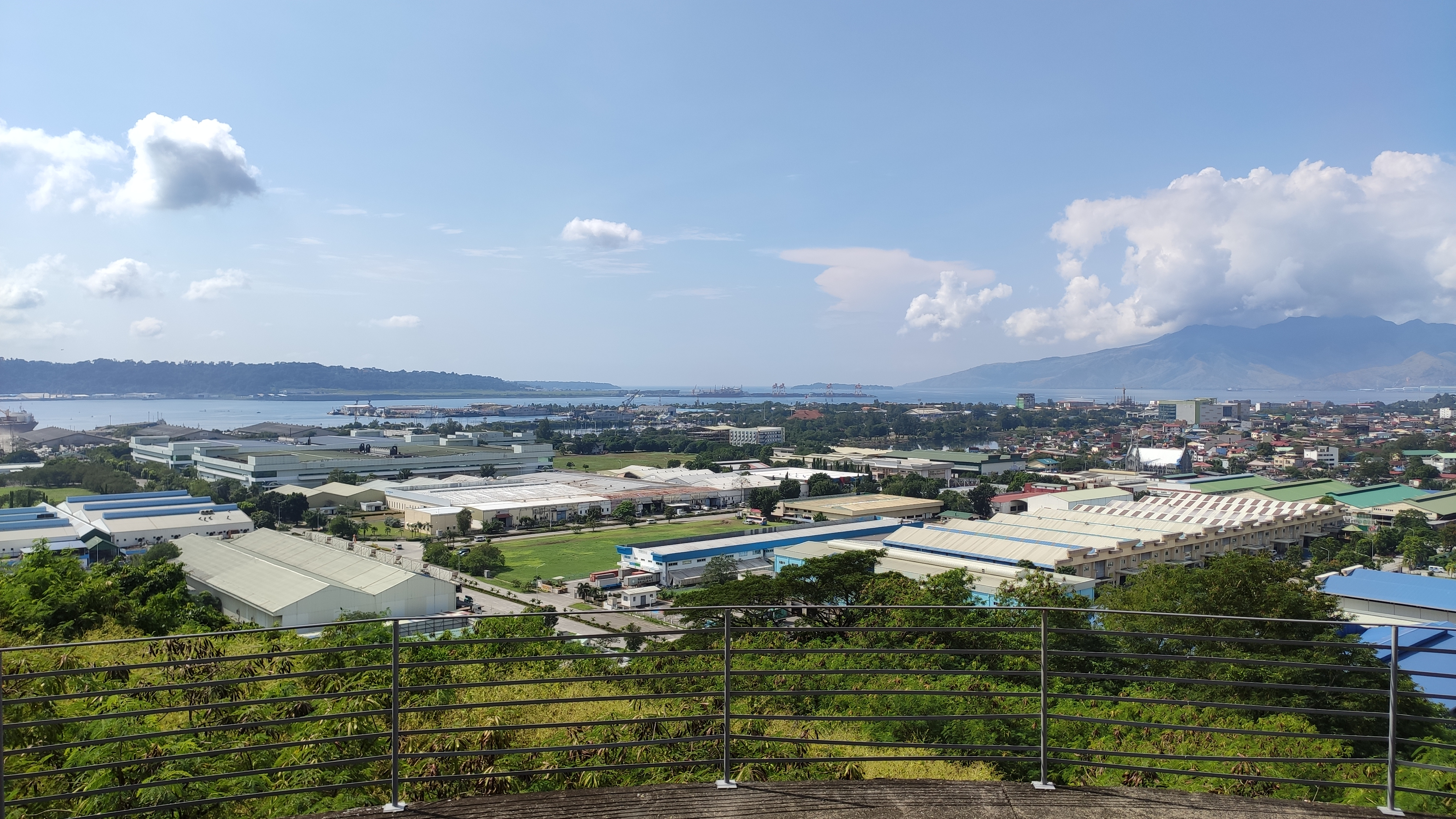
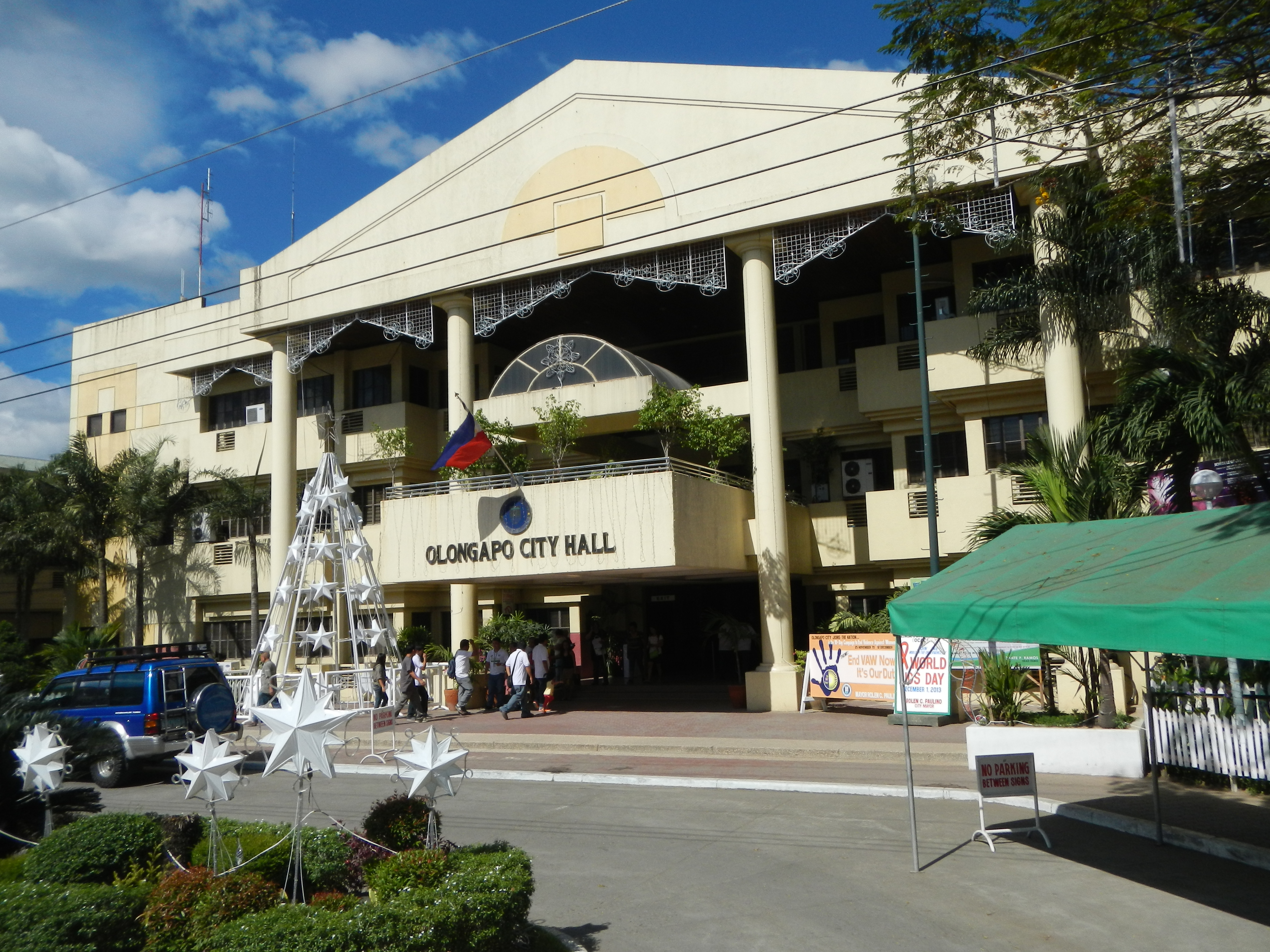
- (from top: left to right) Zambales coastline, Zambales Provincial Capitol, Subic Bay, Zambales Mountains, Subic Bay Economic Zone and Olongapo City Hall

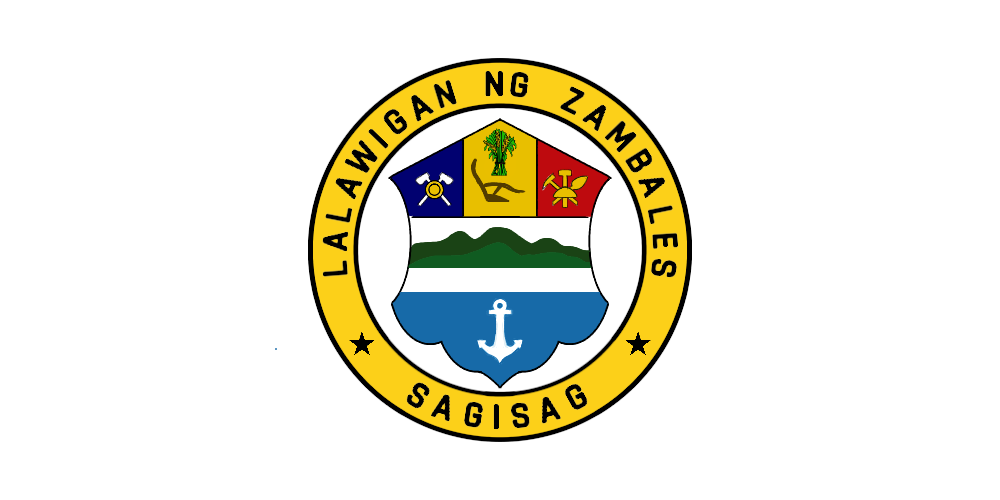
- Flag Seal
- Nickname: Chromite Capital of the Philippines
- Anthem: Himno ng Zambales English: Zambales Hymn; Marcha Zambaleño English: March of the Zambaleans
- Location within the Philippines
- Interactive map of Zambales
- Coordinates: 15°20′N 120°10′E
- Country: Philippines
- Region: Central Luzon
- Founded: 1578
- Capital: Iba
- Largest city: Olongapo*

Government
  - Type: Sangguniang Panlalawigan
  - Governor: Hermogenes E. Ebdane, Jr. (PFP)
  - Vice Governor: Jacqueline Rose F. Khonghun (Lakas-CMD)
  - Legislature: Zambales Provincial Board
  - Electorate: 552,136 voters (2025)

Area
  - Total: 3,645.83 km^{2} (1,407.66 sq mi)
  - Rank: 35th out of 82
- (excluding Olongapo City)
- Highest elevation (Mount Tapulao): 2,037 m (6,683 ft)

Population (2024 census)
  - Total: 681,225
  - Rank: 46th out of 82
  - Density: 186.850/km^{2} (483.940/sq mi)
  - Households: 165,045
- Demonyms: Zambaleno (m/n); Zambalena (f); Zambalense

Divisions
  - Independent cities: 1: Olongapo*
  - Component cities: 0
  - Municipalities: 13: Botolan; Cabangan; Candelaria; Castillejos; Iba; Masinloc; Palauig; San Antonio; San Felipe; San Marcelino; San Narciso; Santa Cruz; Subic
  - Barangays: 247; excluding independent cities: 230
  - Districts: Legislative districts of Zambales (shared with Olongapo City)

Economy
  - Income class: 1st provincial income class
  - Poverty incidence: 11.8% (2023)
  - Revenue: ₱ 3,288 million (2024)
  - Assets: ₱ 13,754 million (2024)
  - Expenditure: ₱ 2,979 million (2024)
  - Liabilities: ₱ 3,174 million (2024)
- Time zone: UTC+8 (PST)
- PSGC: 0307100000
- IDD : area code: +63 (0)47
- ISO 3166 code: PH-ZMB
- Ethnic groups: Tagalog (42%); Ilocano (28%); Sambal (27%); Others (3%)
- Major religions: Roman Catholicism; Aglipayan Church; Protestantism; Islam
- Ecclesiastical dioceses: Diocese of Iba (Roman Catholic); Diocese of Zambales (Aglipayan Church)
- Patron saint: Our Lady of Poon Bato and Saint Augustine of Hippo
- Feast day: January 24 and August 28 respectively
- Spoken languages: Tagalog; Filipino; Ilocano; Sambal; Botolan; Ambala; English
- * Olongapo is a highly-urbanized city, politically independent from Zambales.

Zambales, officially the Province of Zambales (Sambal: Probinsya nin Zambales; Ilocano: Probinsia ti Zambales; Pangasinan: Luyag na Zambales; Kapampangan: Lalawigan ning Zambales; Tagalog: Lalawigan ng Zambales), is a province in the Philippines located in the Central Luzon region. Its capital is Iba, which is located in the middle of the province. Olongapo is the largest city of the province wherein it is geographically located but politically independent.

Zambales borders Pangasinan to the north and northeast, Tarlac to the east, Pampanga to the southeast, Bataan to the south and the West Philippine Sea to the west. With a total land area of 3,830.83 square kilometres (1,479.09 sq mi) (including the independent city of Olongapo), Zambales is the second largest among the seven provinces of Central Luzon after Nueva Ecija. The province is noted for its mangoes, which are abundant from January to April.

Zambales does not have a functional airport; the closest functional airport is Clark International Airport in Angeles City in the neighbouring province of Pampanga. Subic Bay International Airport, which is located in Cubi Point (geographically and politically located inside Morong, Bataan) in the Subic Bay Freeport Zone is no longer functional for domestic and international flights.

The Freeport Zone (SBFZ) is host to many tourist attractions which include casinos, parks, malls, beach-side huts, cottages and resorts, as well as historical sites.

== Etymology ==
The name of the province is derived from "Zambales", the Hispanized name of the Sambal people. The Sambal were the original dominant ethnic group of the region.

== History ==
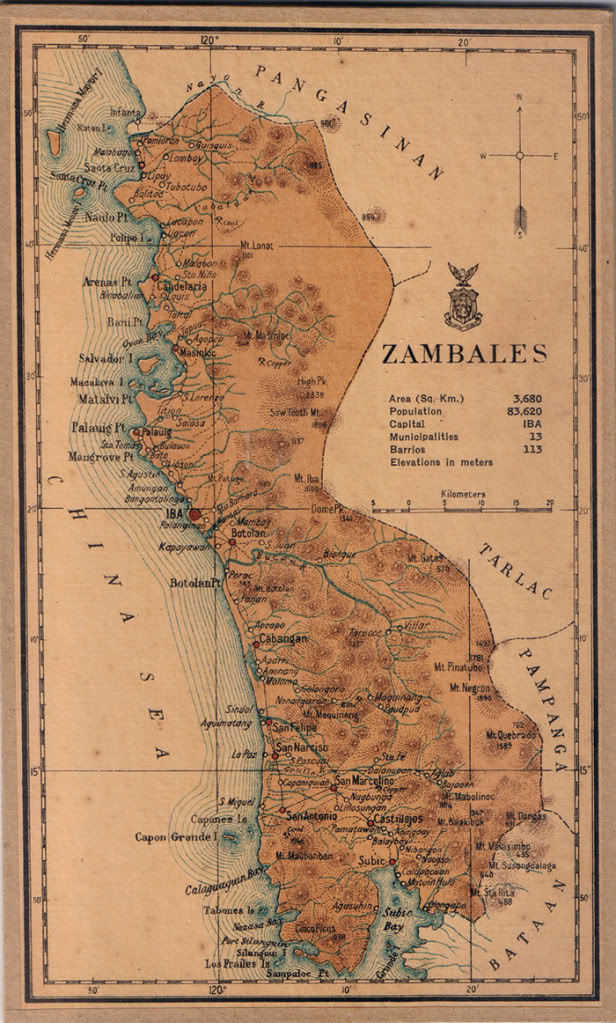
Zambales map in 1918

=== Spanish colonial era ===
The Spanish first explored the area in 1572, led by Juan de Salcedo. Off Cape Bolinao (now part of Pangasinan), he and his men liberated a Zambal chieftain and his followers from a Chinese pirate ship. This act gained the natives' goodwill. Shortly thereafter, the province was organized. Among the earliest towns founded were Masinloc (1607), Subic (1607), Iba (1611), Santa Cruz (1612), and Botolan (1736). Zambales was originally derived from 2 parts: the southern area from Pampanga and the northern area from Pangasinan.

During the Spanish period, a 1774 map was made, which clearly named Scarborough Shoals as Panacot Shoal, a feature under complete sovereignty of Spanish Philippines, specifically of Zambales. The shoal's current name was chosen by Captain Philip D'Auvergne, whose East India Company East Indiaman Scarborough briefly grounded on one of the rocks on September 12, 1784, before sailing on to China. When the Philippines was granted independence in the 19th century and 20th century, Scarborough Shoal was passed by the colonial governments to the sovereign Republic of the Philippines. By the end of the 1700s, Zambales had 1,136 native families and 73 Spanish Filipino families.

=== American colonial era ===
Masinloc became the province's first capital. However, the capital was moved among the last three towns above during its history before finally settling in Iba, due to its strategic location. Seven of the province's original northern towns, which included Bolinao, Infanta, San Isidro, now Burgos, Anda, Bani, Agno and Alaminos were later transferred under the jurisdiction of Pangasinan because of their distance from the capital. The first civil governor of Zambales during the colonial American era was Potenciano Lesaca from 1901 to 1903.

=== Post-war era ===
Under a 1947 Military Bases Agreement, the Philippines granted the United States a 99-year lease on several U.S. bases, including U.S. Naval Base Subic Bay. A later amendment in 1966 reduced the original 99-year term of the agreement to 25 years. A renewal of the agreement in 1979 allowed the U.S. to continue operating the bases until November 1991, when the Philippine Senate rejected a bill for the renewal of U.S. bases in the Philippines.

On November 3, 1962, a mass oath-taking was held among nearly 3,000 Nacionalista officials in the province, including Governor Manuel D. Barretto, for their induction into the Liberal Party, aligning themselves with the Macapagal administration.

=== Martial law era ===
The beginning months of the 1970s marked a period of turmoil and change in the Philippines, as well as in Zambales. During his bid to be the first Philippine president to be re-elected for a second term, Ferdinand Marcos launched an unprecedented number of foreign debt-funded public works projects. This caused the Philippine economy took a sudden downwards turn known as the 1969 Philippine balance of payments crisis, which in turn led to a period of economic difficulty and a significant rise of social unrest.

The end of the 1960s had also seen a major diplomatic incident at Subic Naval Base in the form of the June 10, 1969 killing of 21 year old Filipino laborer Glicerio Amor by US Navy Gunner's Mate 3/E Michael Moomey, who claimed during his trial that he had mistaken Amor for a Wild Boar when he was hunting at the Boton Valley Rifle and Pistol Range while off duty. The Moomey incident, which was eventually adapted into the popular 1976 Filipino film Minsa'y Isang Gamu-gamo, helped the push for the renegotiation of the US-Philippines Bases Treaty at the end of the 1970s.

With only a year left in his last constitutionally allowed term as president Ferdinand Marcos placed the Philippines under Martial Law in September 1972 and thus retained the position for fourteen more years. This period in Philippine history is remembered for the Marcos administration's record of human rights abuses, particularly targeting political opponents, student activists, journalists, religious workers, farmers, and others who fought against the Marcos dictatorship. During the dictatorship of Ferdinand Marcos, Zambales was one of the most militarized areas. Among the Zambales activists who were killed by the Marcos regime during this time were Ellecer Cortes, Dennis Deveraturda, and Butch Landrito - all of whom were later recognized at the Philippines' Bantayog ng mga Bayani memorial for resisting the Marcos regime's assault on democracy.

In Olongapo, the continuation of the Vietnam war through this period meant the arrival of a constantly growing number of U.S. Sailors to Subic Naval Base, and along with it, the rapid growth of prostitution. The policies of the Marcos administration encouraged the growth of the sex-industry because it increased the flow of higher value currency into the Philippine economy. The economy of this part of Zambales evolved from a largely agricultural orientation at the end of the 1960s towards one built around sex industry related businesses such as bars by the mid-1970s.

In 1986, the province was one of the main supporters of the People Power Revolution in Manila, which topped the 21-year dictatorship and installed Corazon Aquino as president, bringing back democracy to the country.

=== Later 20th Century ===
The province was heavily affected by the 1991 eruption of Mount Pinatubo. Due to this, the economy of the province weakened for some time, but regained vitality a few years after the government ordered the revitalization of the province and established growth in its southern towns, which later became a significant economic zone in the country by 1995.

=== Contemporary ===
The 2012 Scarborough Shoal standoff led to a situation where access to the shoal was restricted by the People's Republic of China. However, in 2016, following meetings between the Philippine president Duterte and his PRC counterparts, the PRC allowed Filipino fishermen to access the shoals for fishing.

In 2018, it was revealed that for every 3,000 peso worth of fish catch by Sambal fisherfolks, China siphoned them in exchange for 'two bottles of mineral water' worth 20 pesos. The revelations led to public unrest against China and the Duterte-administered Philippine government. Filipino president Rodrigo Duterte fired back against his fellow Filipinos, including those from Zambales, saying that China's acts were 'fine' as they were 'only barter'. On June 14, 2018, China's destruction of Scarborough Shoal's reefs surged to an extent which they became visible via Google Earth and Philippine satellites, as confirmed by the University of the Philippines Diliman.

== Geography ==
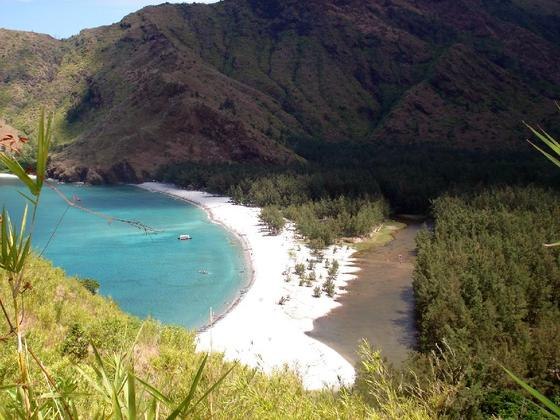
Western coastline of the province featuring several coves

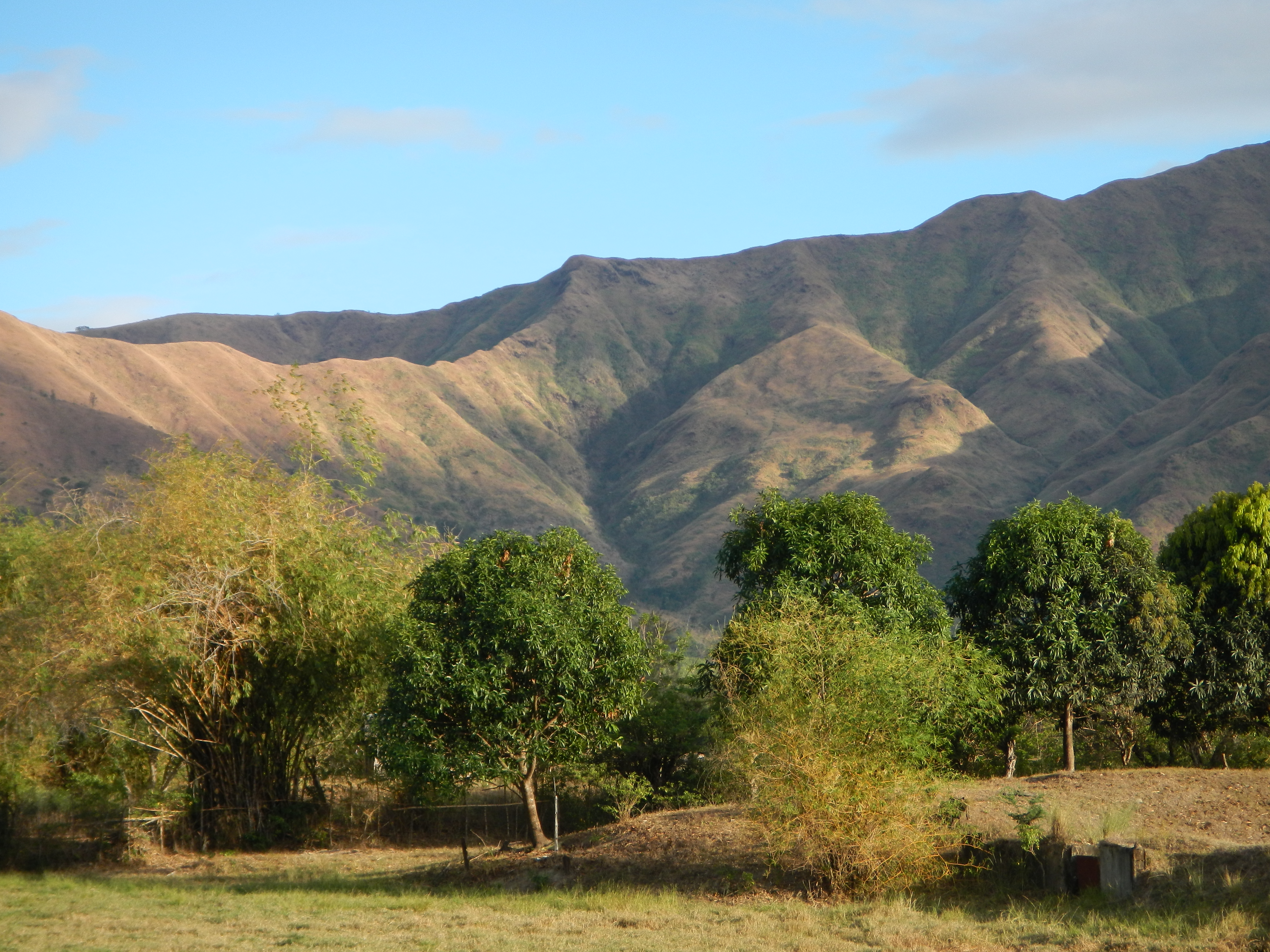
The Zambales Mountains seen from San Antonio

Zambales lies on the western shores of Luzon island along the South China Sea. Its shoreline is rugged and features many coves and inlets. The Zambales Mountains in the eastern length of the province occupies about 60% of the total land area of Zambales. Subic Bay, at the southern end of the province east of the Redondo Peninsula, provides a natural harbor, and was the location of the U.S. Naval Base Subic Bay until its closure in 1992. Much of its population is located on the Olongapo–Bugallon Road parallel to the shoreline, as well as Jose Abad Santos Avenue leading from Olongapo to Dinalupihan and onward to central Pampanga.

The summit and crater lake of Mount Pinatubo lies within Botolan municipality in Zambales, near the tripoint of Zambales, Pampanga and Tarlac provinces. This volcano, once considered dormant, erupted violently in June 1991. The former summit of the volcano was obliterated by the massive eruption and replaced by a 2.5 km (1.6 mi) wide caldera, within which Lake Pinatubo is situated. With an average depth of 800 m (2,600 ft), Lake Pinatubo is the deepest lake in the Philippines. The highest point of the caldera rim is 1,485 m (4,872 ft) above sea level, some 260 m (850 ft) lower than the pre-eruption summit. A vast portion of the Zambales province acquired desert-like features in 1991, after being buried by more than 20 feet (6.1 m) of lahar.

=== Climate ===
Zambales has two pronounced seasons: dry from October to June, and wet from July to September.

=== Administrative divisions ===
Zambales comprises 13 municipalities and one highly urbanized city, which are divided into two legislative districts. Olongapo is a highly urbanized city and administers itself autonomously from the province. Panatag Shoal (Scarborough Shoal) a Philippine-claimed territory, is a designated part of the province.

The northern half of the province comprises the municipalities of Santa Cruz, Candelaria, Masinloc, and Palauig. The central half of the province consists of the municipalities of Iba (the capital), Botolan, Cabangan, and San Felipe. The southern half of the province is composed of the municipalities of San Narciso, San Marcelino, San Antonio, Castillejos, Subic, and the highly urbanized city of Olongapo.

Political map

^{Disputed territory} — Scarborough shoal, locally known as Panatag Shoal or Bajo Masinloc, is designated under Masinloc municipality. Internationally disputed. Claimed by the People's Republic of China, Philippines, and Republic of China (Taiwan). De facto controlled by the People's Republic of China since 2012.

6	Botolan
7	Cabangan
2	Candelaria
12	Castillejos
5	Iba
3	Masinloc
14	Olongapo
4	Palauig
11	San Antonio
8	San Felipe
10	San Marcelino
9	San Narciso
1	Santa Cruz
13	Subic

- † Provincial capital
- Municipality
- ‡ Highly urbanized city (geographically within but independent from the province)

City or municipality		District	Population			±% p.a.	Area		Density		Barangay	Coordinates^{[A]}
			(2020)		(2015)		km^{2}	sq mi	/km^{2}	/sq mi		
Botolan		2nd	10.3%	66,739	57,707	+2.81%	735.28	283.89	91	240	31	15°17′20″N 120°01′29″E
Cabangan		2nd	4.3%	28,118	25,163	+2.14%	175.29	67.68	160	410	22	15°09′32″N 120°03′20″E
Candelaria		2nd	4.7%	30,263	27,174	+2.07%	333.59	128.80	91	240	16	15°37′38″N 119°55′45″E
Castillejos		1st	10.5%	67,889	64,841	+0.88%	92.99	35.90	730	1,900	14	14°55′48″N 120°12′18″E
Iba	†	2nd	8.6%	55,581	50,506	+1.84%	153.38	59.22	360	930	14	15°19′35″N 119°58′43″E
Masinloc		2nd	8.4%	54,529	47,719	+2.57%	316.02	122.02	170	440	13	15°32′16″N 119°57′06″E
Olongapo	‡	1st	—	260,317	233,040	+2.13%	185.00	71.43	1,400	3,600	17	14°49′53″N 120°17′01″E
Palauig		2nd	6.1%	39,784	34,947	+2.50%	310.00	119.69	130	340	19	15°26′03″N 119°54′30″E
San Antonio		2nd	5.8%	37,450	34,661	+1.48%	188.12	72.63	200	520	14	14°56′56″N 120°05′20″E
San Felipe		2nd	3.9%	25,033	23,183	+1.47%	111.60	43.09	220	570	11	15°03′40″N 120°04′13″E
San Marcelino		1st	5.8%	37,719	33,665	+2.19%	416.86	160.95	90	230	18	14°58′31″N 120°09′24″E
San Narciso		2nd	4.7%	30,759	28,360	+1.56%	71.60	27.64	430	1,100	17	15°00′54″N 120°04′44″E
Santa Cruz		2nd	9.8%	63,839	58,151	+1.79%	438.46	169.29	150	390	25	15°45′45″N 119°54′36″E
Subic		1st	17.2%	111,912	104,771	+1.26%	287.16	110.87	390	1,000	16	14°52′39″N 120°14′04″E
Total^{[B]}				649,615	590,848	+1.82%	3,645.83	1,407.66	180	470	230	(see GeoGroup box)
1. Coordinates mark the city/town center, and are sortable by latitude.; 2. Total figures exclude the highly urbanized city of Olongapo.

=== Barangays ===
The 13 municipalities and 1 city of the province comprise 247 barangays, with Santa Rita in Olongapo City as the most populous in 2010, and Owaog-Nibloc in Botolan as the least. If cities are excluded, Calapacuan in Subic has the highest population as of 2010.

== Demographics ==
Population census of Zambales

Year	Pop.	±% p.a.
1903	59,930	—
1918	83,750	+2.26%
1939	106,945	+1.17%
1948	138,536	+2.92%
1960	213,442	+3.67%
1970	235,249	+0.98%

Year	Pop.	±% p.a.
1975	269,171	+2.74%
1980	287,607	+1.33%
1990	369,665	+2.54%
1995	389,512	+0.98%
2000	433,542	+2.32%
2007	493,085	+1.79%

Year	Pop.	±% p.a.
2010	534,443	+2.97%
2015	590,848	+1.93%
2020	649,615	+2.02%
2024	681,225	+1.15%

(excluding Olongapo City)
Source: Philippine Statistics Authority

The population of Zambales in the 2024 census was 681,225 people, with a density of 190 inhabitants per square kilometre or 490 inhabitants per square mile. When Olongapo City is included for geographical purposes, the province's population is 909,932 people, with a density of 215/km^{2} (557/sq mi).

=== Inhabitants ===
The Aetas of Mount Pinatubo were the earliest inhabitants of what is now the province of Zambales. They were later displaced by the Sambal, an Austronesian people after whom the province is named. Many Sambal still believe in superstitions and mysteries that have been handed down through the generations.

The Tagalogs, the Ilocanos, the Sambal, the Kapampangans, and the Pangasinans today constitute the five largest ethnic groups in Zambales; these identities may and do, however, overlap with one another due to intermarriage and other factors. The less populated valley of the province was settled by settlers from the Ilocos and the Tagalog regions, leading to the assimilation of Sambals to Ilocano & Tagalog settlers & modern decline in the Sambal cultural identity and language. Most of the people of southern Zambales are migrants from different parts of the country, owing the influx of job opportunities brought on by the U.S Subic Naval Base (San Antonio and Subic) during the American regime of the country. Many people found jobs and permanently settled there. The presence of the Americans greatly influenced the culture and way of life of the inhabitants.

=== Religion ===
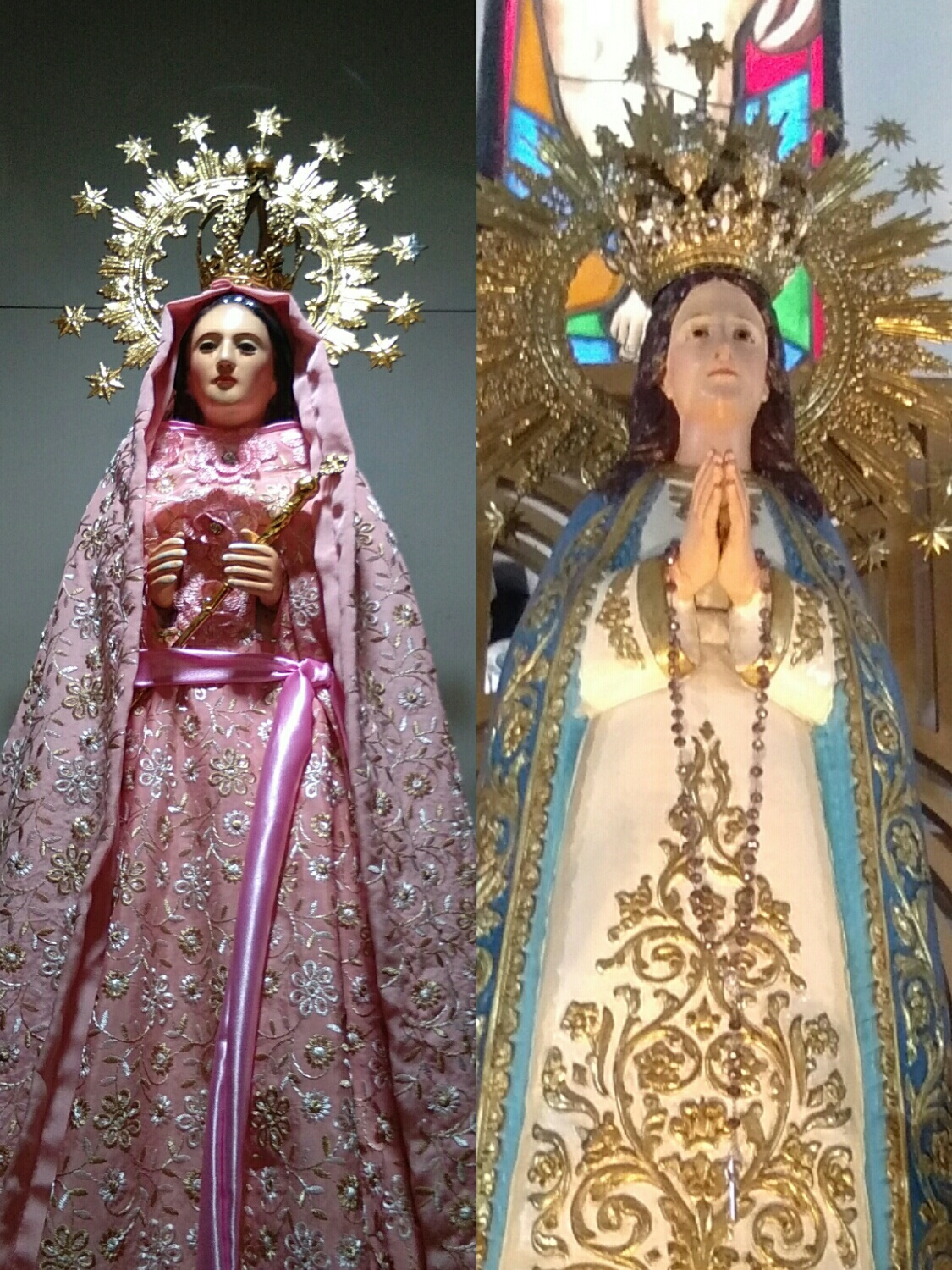
Our Lady of Poon Bato Patroness of the province of Zambales

The people of Zambales are predominantly Roman Catholic (78.22%) under the jurisdiction of the Diocese of Iba. A sizeable portion of the population also belongs to the Aglipayan Church (6.12%) under the jurisdiction of the Diocese of Zambales and Iglesia ni Cristo (6%) the province has subdivided into 2 Ecclesiastical Districts of the Church has numerous locales dominates in cities and municipalities even in remote barrios . The remaining are divided with other Christian groups such as Born-again Christians, United Methodist Church, The Church of Jesus Christ of Latter-day Saints, Jehovah's Witnesses, Seventh-day Adventist, United Church of Christ in the Philippines as well as Non Christians which is usually represented by Muslims.

Town fiestas honoring patron saints are practiced in each parish.

=== Languages ===
Languages Spoken (2000)
Language	Number of speakers
Tagalog	164,000
Ilocano	119,000
Sambal	117,000

Sambal, Tagalog, and Ilocano are the three main languages of Zambales. Ilocano has 115,337 native speakers, Sambal has 114,637, and Tagalog has 250,637 (plus 24,995 non-native speakers). Sambal residents in Iba have switched their language from Sambal to Ilocano & Tagalog, while Castillejos has shifted from Ilocano to Tagalog, and Cabangan from Ilocano and Sambal to Tagalog. Sambal & Sambalic languages as a whole are most closely related to Kapampangan. More than 119,126 spoke other languages as their parent tongue, such as Kapampangan and Pangasinan (also spoken by Sambals on the Zambales-Pangasinan boundary), including non-Philippine languages such as English and Hokkien Chinese. Other Sambalic languages spoken in Zambales are Botolan, Ambala, and Mag-antsi. About 75 percent of the population speaks and understands English to varying degrees of fluency, and road signs are mostly written in that language.

== Economy ==
Poverty incidence of Zambales (%)

Source: Philippine Statistics Authority

Zambales is considered first-class when it achieved its annual revenue growth of P2.09 billion from 2020 to 2022 with economy grew by 5% in 2023, which was slower than the 11.2% growth in 2022. Tourism plays a large role in the economy of Zambales. Local and foreign tourist flock its many beaches creating many job opportunities and contributing to the economy. Most of the province is still agricultural but there are considerable industrial & commercial zones that provide jobs not just for residents of Zambales but also for neighboring provinces. Mining has recently been booming in Zambales where there is an abundant deposit of Nickel and other minerals.

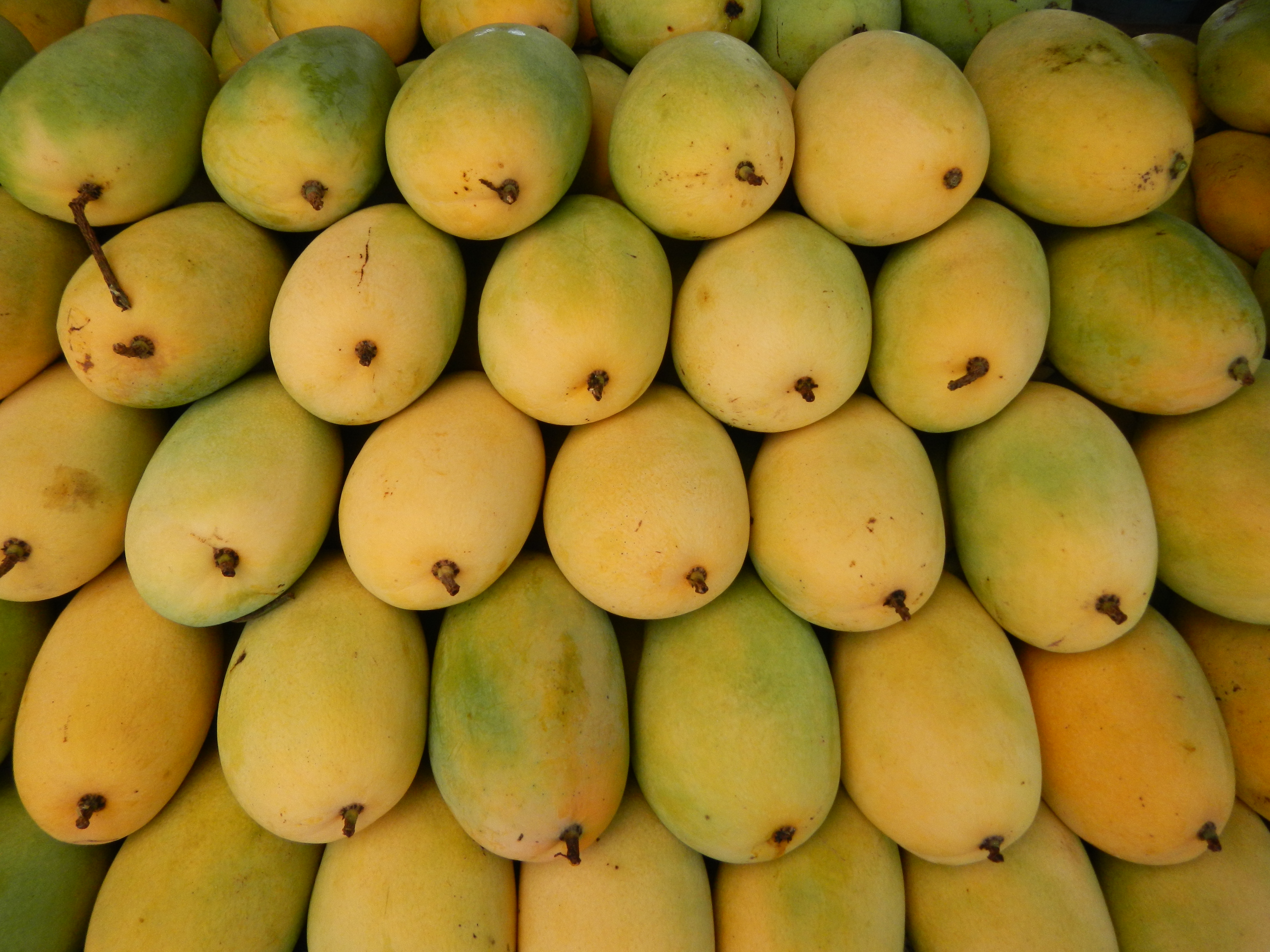
Mangoes from Zambales

Zambales is basically an agricultural province. The chief products are rice, mangoes, corn, vegetables, and root crops. Major industries include farming, fishing, and mining.

== Government ==
Current Provincial Government Officials (2025-2028)

- Governor: Hermogenes E. Ebdane (PFP/SZP)
- Vice-Governor: Jaqueline Rose F. Khonghun (Lakas)

Sangguniang Panlalawigan Members

1st District

- Maria Cecilia F. Rafanan (SZP)
- Enrique F. Delgardo (SZP)
- Elmer S. Tumaca (SZP)

2nd District

- Jun Rundstedt C. Ebdane (SZP)
- Reena Mae L. Collado (SZP)
- Thea Samantha D. Ablola (SZP)
- Juvy E. Deloso (SZP)
- Sancho G. Abasta III (SZP)
- Enrico Matibag (SZP)
- Noel S. Ferrer (Independent)

Ex-Officio Members

- Raedag Villamin Jr. (President, Liga ng mga Barangay)
- Carl Eric B. Rico (President, PCL)
- Daniel John Lachica (President, Panlalawigang Pederasyon ng Sangguniang Kabataan)

== House of Representatives ==
District	Representative	Party	Term	Bloc
1st	Jefferson F. Khonghun	Lakas	2	Majority
2nd	Doris E. Maniquiz	Lakas	2	Majority

== Festivals and events ==
- Feast Day of Ina Poon Bato (Botolan) — January 24. The Ina Poón Bató is a purportedly miraculous, syncretised image of the Blessed Virgin Mary. Legend has it that before the arrival of the Spanish in the area sometime in the 17th century, local Aeta peoples had discovered a carved wooden statue on a large rock that they called Apo Apang ("Little Queen") and began worshipping the image. On the arrival of Recollect missionaries in 1607, the natives associated the statue with the Roman Catholic depictions of the Virgin Mary, and the image was subsequently Christianised as Ina Poón Bato ("Mother of the Lord Rock").
- Singkamas Festival and Town Fiesta (San Marcelino) — 3rd Week of February
- Town Fiesta (San Narciso) — February 19–25
- Pundakit Festival of the Arts (San Antonio) — February‑July
- Zambales Multi Sports Festival Senakulo — 3rd Week of March
- Panagkakadua-an Festival (San Felipe) - 1st Week of April
- Good Friday (Castillejos) — April
- Foundation Day Celebration (Palauig) — April 10
- Grand Fiesta (Cabangan) — April 21–25
- The Dinamulag Festival "Zambales Mango Festival" (Iba) — 3rd Tuesday of April The Dinamulag Festival also known as the Zambales Mango Festival is an annual festival held in the province of Zambales in the Philippines to celebrate or encourage bountiful harvest of the province's mangoes. The festival was first held in 1999.
- Paynawen Festival (Iba) — 3rd Week of April Paynauen ‘Duyan’ Festival is held every April 25 – May 1 in Iba, Zambales. It commemorates the provincial capital's founding anniversary (founded in 1611) traces its origin from a Zambal word which means rest or pahingahan – the ancient name of Iba before the Spanish conquistadores founded the village on the shore of the Bancal River in 1611. The festival features photo competition and exhibit, sand sculpture competition, skate boarding, 2-cock derby, carabao race, beauty pageant, kite flying, banca race, boxing tournament, street dancing / Duyan Parade, among other activities.
- Marunggay Festival and Town Fiesta (San Antonio) — Last Week of April
- Domorokdok Festival (Botolan) — May 4
- Laruk Laruk Festival (Candelaria) — Last Week of October
- Binabayani Festival and Town Fiesta (Masinloc) — November 30 The Binabayani Festival occurs every November in the city of Masinloc in Zambales. A dance/play depicting the clash between the Spanish and the Natives of Masinloc or the triumph of Christianity over Paganism. The war dance starts with a procession in the afternoon of November 29 and opens in a mass on November 30. This annual religious festival is celebrated with day long activities in honor of San Andres, the patron saint of Masinloc. Binabayani is a war dance that portrays the battle between the Christian and the Aetas in the town of Masinloc. It is a word that means “bravery”. It is usually featured at the town plaza on the 30th day of November for the public to witness.
- Kaligawan Ha Mayanan (Candelaria) — December 29–30
- Olongapo Mardigras (Olongapo) — Last Week of October

== Education ==
There are a number of higher educational institutions in the province. The President Ramon Magsaysay State University (PRMSU), the first state university in the province can be found in Iba. It has also satellite campuses in the municipalities of Santa Cruz, Candelaria, Masinloc, Botolan, San Marcelino, and Castillejos. St. Joseph College-Olongapo, a college run by the Roman Catholic Church can be found in Olongapo City. The Columban College, run by the Catholic Church can be found also in Olongapo. The Magsaysay Memorial College is also run by the Roman Catholic Church and can be found in San Narciso.

=== Colleges and universities ===
- AIE College International (Olongapo City)
- AMA Computer College (Olongapo City)
- AMA Computer Learning Center (Olongapo City)
- Asian Institute of Computer Studies (Olongapo City)
- Best Freeport Colleges Inc. (Subic Bay Freeport Zone)
- Polytechnic College of Botolan (Botolan)
- Capstone Institute of Business and Arts (Olongapo City)
- Central Luzon College of Science and Technology (Olongapo City)
- College of Subic Montessori Subic Bay (Subic Bay Freeport Zone)
- Collegio de Castillejos (Castillejos)
- Columban College - Barreto Campus (Olongapo City)
- Columban College - Santa Cruz Campus (Santa Cruz)
- Columban College - Main Campus (Olongapo City)
- Comteq Computer and Business College (Subic Bay Freeport Zone)
- Don Bosco College of Zambales (Castillejos)
- Don Luis Orin Junior College of Criminology, Inc. (Iba)
- First EDT Learning Center, Inc. (Subic Bay Freeport Zone)
- Freeport SBLC Inc. (Subic Bay Freeport Zone)
- GIS Institute of Technology Phils Inc. (San Marcelino)
- Global City Innovative College Subic (Olongapo City)
- Gordon College (Olongapo City)
- Holy Infant Jesus College(Olongapo City)
- Hopeful Beginnings Institute (Iba)
- Keystone Subic International Language Center (Subic Bay Freeport Zone)
- Kolehiyo ng Subic (Subic)
- Lorraine Technical School (Olongapo City)
- Lyceum of Subic Bay (Subic Bay Freeport Zone)
- Magsaysay Memorial College (San Narciso)
- Metro Subic Colleges (Olongapo City)
- Micro Asia College of Science and Technology (Santa Cruz)
- Micro Asia College of Science and Technology (Iba)
- Mondrian Aura College (Subic Bay Freeport Zone)
- Network Computer and Business Colleges (Olongapo City)
- Northern Zambales College (Masinloc)
- Philippine Merchants Marine Academy (San Narciso)
- President Ramon Magsaysay State University - Candelaria (Candelaria)
- President Ramon Magsaysay State University - Castillejos (Castillejos)
- President Ramon Magsaysay State University - Main Campus (Iba)
- President Ramon Magsaysay State University - Masinloc (Masinloc)
- President Ramon Magsaysay State University - Western Luzon Agricultural College (San Marcelino)
- San Antonio Institute of Commerce and Technology (San Antonio)
- Sand Valley Institute of Arts and Trades (Iba)
- St. Benilde Center for Global Competence (Olongapo City)
- St. Joseph College (Olongapo City)
- St. Nicolas Systeq College (Palauig)
- St. Theresa's College - (San Marcelino)
- STI College (Olongapo City)
- Subic Bay Foreign Language Center (Subic Bay Freeport Zone)
- Subic Bay Metropolitan Authority Law Enforcement Academy (Subic Bay Freeport Zone)
- Subic Bay Colleges Inc. - (Olongapo City)
- Subic Institute of International Studies (Subic Bay Freeport Zone)
- Technological College of San Felipe (San Felipe)
- The Thomasites Center for International Studies (Subic Bay Freeport Zone)
- University of the Philippines - Extension Program in Olongapo (Subic Bay Freeport Zone)
- Virgen de los Remedios College (Olongapo City)
- Virgin de los Remedios College of Criminology (Iba)
- Zambales Academy (San Narciso)
- Zambales Lifesaving Inc. PCG Accredited Lifeguard training organization (Botolan)

President Ramon Magsaysay State University (PRMSU)
The President Ramon Magsaysay State University, commonly referred to as PRMSU, is a state university/government-funded higher education institution in Iba, established in 1910. The university is named after former President Ramon Magsaysay, a native of the province. Its main campus is situated in the capital town of Iba, while satellite campuses are located in Santa Cruz, Candelaria, Masinloc, Botolan, San Marcelino, and Castillejos. The university also offers nursing courses at the Mondriaan Aura College in Subic Bay Freeport Zone, Business Administration at the Wesleyan College of Manila under a consortium program.

Columban College, Olongapo
The Columban College, is a private-catholic educational institution in Zambales that was established in 1961. the college was founded by the missionaries from Ireland under the Missionary Society of St. Columban until they turn over the institution to the Diocese of Iba. the institution's main campus is situated at the heart of Olongapo City, other campuses situated at Bo. Barretto, Olongapo which focuses on the southern part of Zambales, and Santa Cruz, Zambales which focuses on the northern part of Zambales. they value Christian Character like any other Catholic Schools as a Christ-centered but competing institution. they offer academic programs within their reach.

== Notable people ==
- Gerald Anderson
- Republic Brass Band
- Norman Balbuena a.k.a. Boobay
- Megan Young
- Elmer Borlongan
- Eric Cray
- Rafael Corpus
- Hermogenes Ebdane
- Loi Ejercito
- Richard J. Gordon
- Luz Magsaysay
- Mitos Magsaysay
- Ramon Magsaysay
- Ramon Magsaysay Jr.
- Lou Diamond Phillips
- Isabel Rivas
- Dennis Roldan
- Ruben Torres
- Teodoro R. Yangco
- Freddie Aguilar
- K Brosas
- Gladys Guevarra
- Wowie de Guzman
- Kristofer Martin
- Blakdyak
- Willie Miller
- Samuel Morrison
- Topex Robinson
- Arnel Pineda
- Angelee delos Reyes
- Lauren Young
- Tom Rodriguez
- Angelu de Leon
- Raikko Mateo
- Ruby Rodriguez
- Jay Washington
- Rico Barrera
- Bea Alonzo
- Gigi de Lana
- Moira Dela Torre
- Jay Khonghun
- Christine Juliane Opiaza
