= Iba, Zambales =

Capital of Zambales, Philippines

Iba
- Municipality
- Municipality of Iba
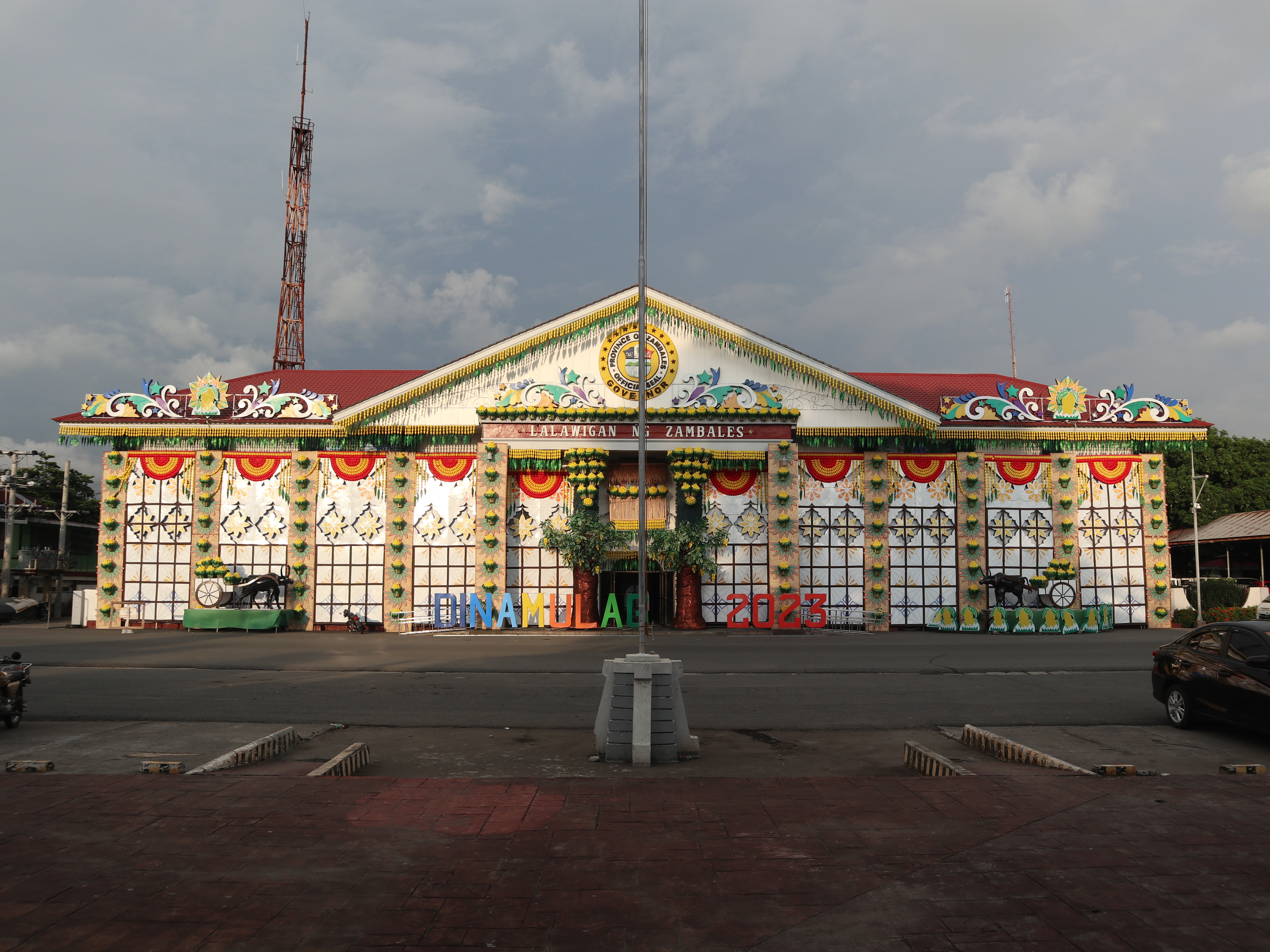
- Zambales Provincial Capitol

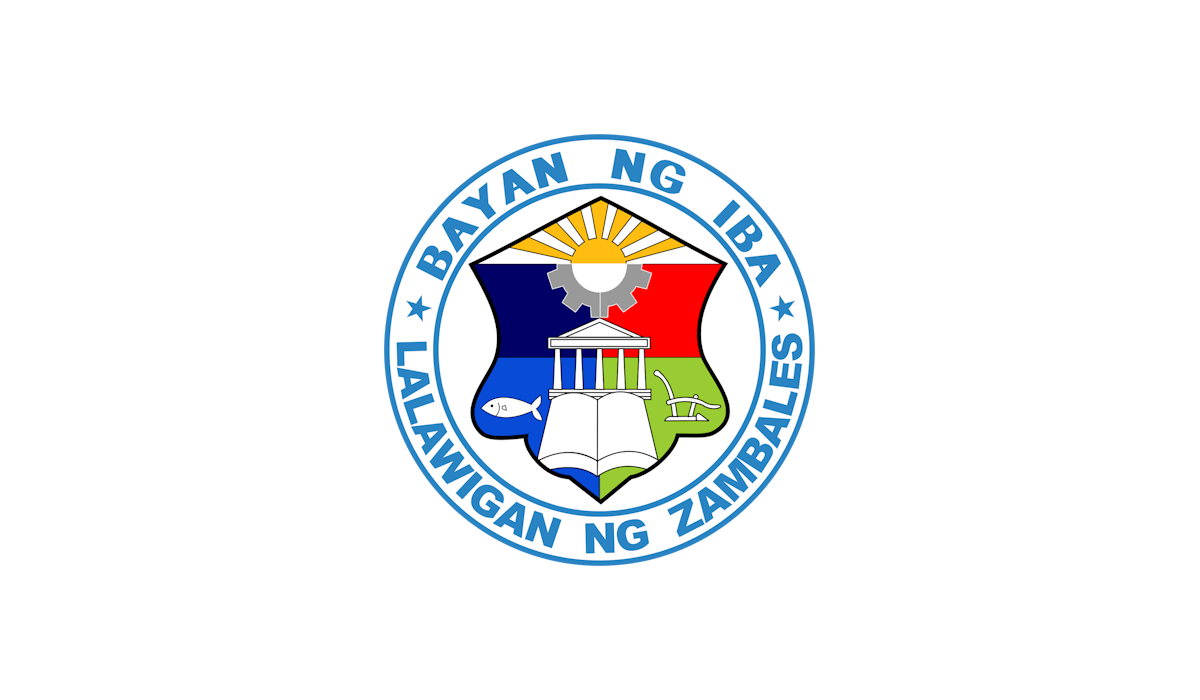
- Flag Seal
- Motto(s): Bagong Iba! & "Go! Iba"
- Anthem: “Bagong Iba”
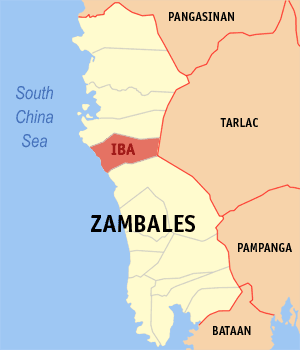
- Map of Zambales with Iba highlighted
- Interactive map of Iba
- Location within the Philippines
- Coordinates: 15°20′N 119°59′E
- Country: Philippines
- Region: Central Luzon
- Province: Zambales
- District: 2nd district
- Founded: 1611
- Founder: Rodrigo de San Miguel
- Barangays: 14 (see Barangays)

Government
  - Type: Sangguniang Bayan
  - Mayor: Irenea Maniquiz (SZP)
  - Vice Mayor: Joan Ballesteros
  - Representative: Doris E. Maniquiz (SZP)
  - Municipal Council: Members: Margie M. Noveno; Salvador Riego D. Redondo; Danilo M. Ballesteros; Francisco P. Aldea; Alcalde D. Fallorin; Isagani Q. Yap; Lanie E. Tabile; Lilia B. Butaran
  - Electorate: 38,256 voters (2025)

Area
  - Total: 153.38 km^{2} (59.22 sq mi)
- Elevation: 10 m (33 ft)
- Highest elevation: 402 m (1,319 ft)
- Lowest elevation: 4 m (13 ft)

Population (2024 census)
  - Total: 59,580
  - Density: 388.4/km^{2} (1,006/sq mi)
  - Households: 13,949

Economy
  - Income class: 1st municipal income class
  - Poverty incidence: 13.37% (2023)
  - Revenue: ₱ 332.4 million (2024)
  - Assets: ₱ 1,052 million (2024)
  - Expenditure: ₱ 358.9 million (2024)
  - Liabilities: ₱ 627 million (2024)

Service provider
  - Electricity: Zambales 1 Electric Cooperative (ZAMECO 1)
- Time zone: UTC+8 (PST)
- ZIP code: 2201
- PSGC: 0307105000
- IDD : area code: +63 (0)47
- Native languages: Sambal; Ilocano; Tagalog
- Major religions: Roman Catholicism; Aglipayan Church; Protestantism
- Feast date: August 28
- Ecclesiastical dioceses: Diocese of Iba (Roman Catholic); Diocese of Zambales (Aglipayan Church)
- Patron saint: Augustine of Hippo
- Website: ibazambales.gov.ph

Iba [ˈiba], officially the Municipality of Iba (Sambal: Babali nin Iba; Ilocano: Ili ti Iba; Tagalog: Bayan ng Iba), is a 1st Class municipality and capital of the province of Zambales, Philippines. According to the 2024 census, it has a population of 59,580 people.

The town is also known as the birthplace of Ramon Magsaysay, the 7th President of the Philippines.

== Etymology ==
The municipality was named after the tree Phyllanthus acidus, which bears edible sour fruits. It is locally known as iba, a name which also applies to the similar kamias (Averrhoa bilimbi).

== History ==
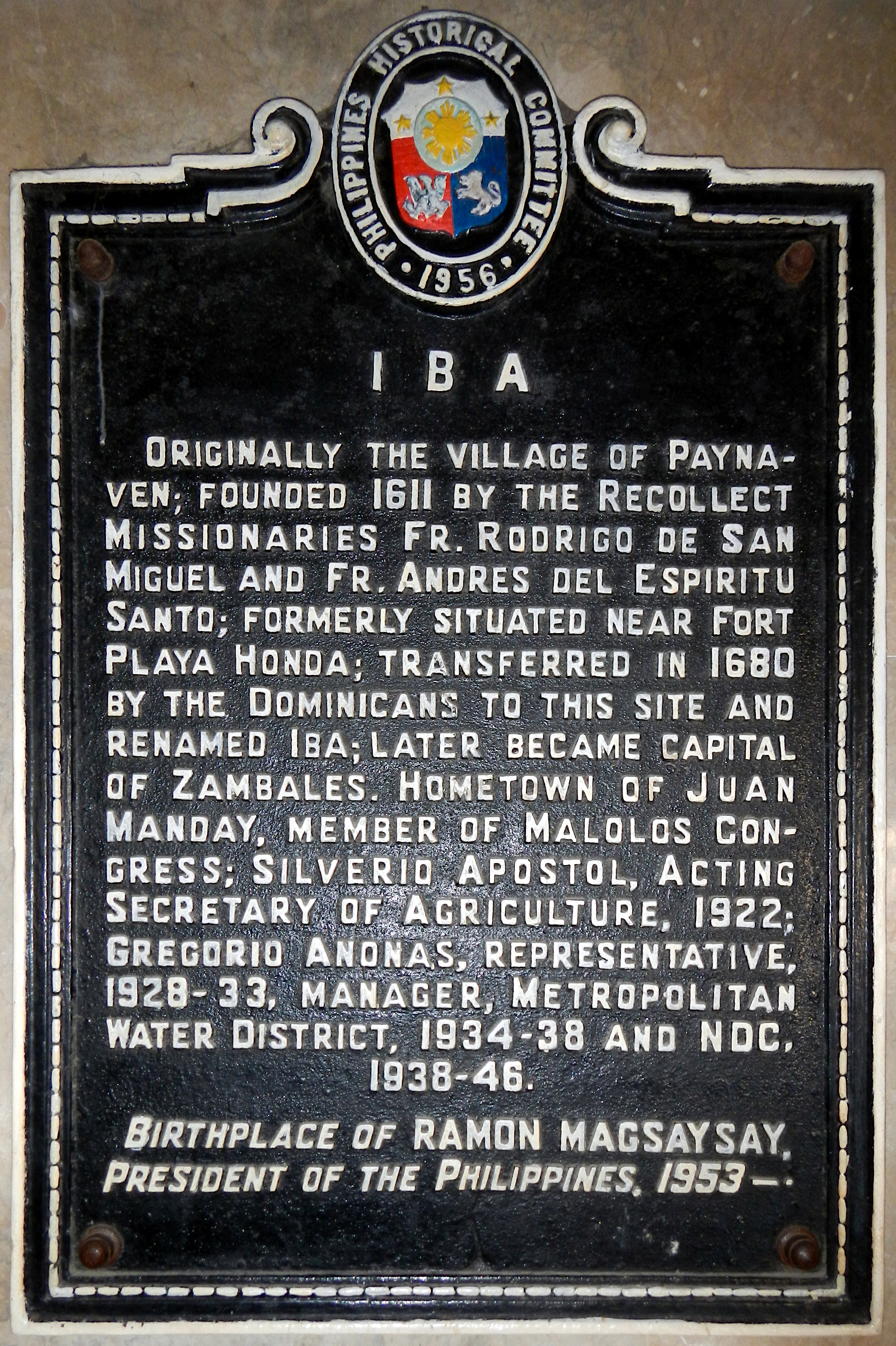
Historical marker at the Zambales Provincial Capitol

Iba was founded by the Order of Augustinian Recollect priests led by Rodrigo de San Miguel in 1611 as the village of Paynauen. The early inhabitants of the town are called Zambals. They were later joined by the Tagalogs and Ilocanos who migrated to the town, which resulted in the intermingling of customs and traditions. The Aeta people settled in the hinterlands and the majority of them dwelled in the Mount Pinatubo area. In 1860, the administration of the town was turned over to the Dominican priests until the civil government came to power. There are no available records as to when Paynauen was renamed Iba.

The permanent capital of Zambales was moved from Masinloc to Iba because of its strategic location being on the central part of Zambales. On August 28, 1901, American Civil Governor William Howard Taft held the historic session of the Second Philippine Commission at the Roman Catholic Church of Iba and established the Province of Zambales under American rule.

On November 3, 1962, Mayor Atilano M. Ortega, then the president of the Zambales Mayors League, and nearly 3,000 other Nacionalista officials in Zambales joined the Liberal Party, aligning themselves with the Macapagal administration.

== Geography ==
The municipality of Iba is bounded by the municipalities of Botolan to the south, Palauig to the north, the province of Tarlac to the east, and the South China Sea to the west. Like most of the municipalities in the province, Iba is geographically bound by the coast in the west with the Zambales Mountains in the eastern portion of the municipality.

As the capital of the province, it is second largest provincial capital in terms of land area in Central Luzon Region after Tarlac City.

Iba is 78 kilometres (48 mi) from Olongapo and 204 kilometres (127 mi) from Manila.

=== Barangays ===
Iba is politically subdivided into 14 barangays, as indicated below. Each barangay consists of puroks and some have sitios.

There are 9 barangays which are considered urban (highlighted in bold) while the rest are considered rural.

- **Amungan**
- Bangantalinga
- **Dirita-Baloguen**
- Lipay-Dingin-Panibuatan
- **Palanginan**
- San Agustin
- Santa Barbara
- Santo Rosario
- **Zone 1 Poblacion**
- **Zone 2 Poblacion**
- **Zone 3 Poblacion**
- **Zone 4 Poblacion**
- **Zone 5 Poblacion**
- **Zone 6 Poblacion**

=== Climate ===
Iba has a tropical monsoon climate (Köppen climate classification Am). Iba's climate is no different from the other towns where rainy season begins from May and ends in October, while the dry season is from November to April. An average of 43.15 centimetres (16.99 in) of annual rainfall with a temperature of 22 °C (72 °F) is observed during rainy season. The highest temperature recorded is 34 °C (93 °F) while the lowest is 19.18 °C (66.52 °F).

Climate data for Iba (1991–2020, extremes 1910–2023)
| Month | Jan | Feb | Mar | Apr | May | Jun | Jul | Aug | Sep | Oct | Nov | Dec | Year |
|---|---|---|---|---|---|---|---|---|---|---|---|---|---|
| Record high °C (°F) | 37.2 (99.0) | 37.2 (99.0) | 38.5 (101.3) | 38.8 (101.8) | 39.2 (102.6) | 38.2 (100.8) | 38.6 (101.5) | 35.7 (96.3) | 35.6 (96.1) | 37.0 (98.6) | 38.3 (100.9) | 38.1 (100.6) | 38.8 (101.8) |
| Mean daily maximum °C (°F) | 30.9 (87.6) | 31.2 (88.2) | 31.9 (89.4) | 33.2 (91.8) | 32.8 (91.0) | 31.8 (89.2) | 30.6 (87.1) | 30.1 (86.2) | 30.4 (86.7) | 31.4 (88.5) | 31.6 (88.9) | 31.3 (88.3) | 31.4 (88.5) |
| Daily mean °C (°F) | 26.1 (79.0) | 26.4 (79.5) | 27.2 (81.0) | 28.6 (83.5) | 28.5 (83.3) | 27.8 (82.0) | 27.0 (80.6) | 26.7 (80.1) | 26.9 (80.4) | 27.5 (81.5) | 27.4 (81.3) | 26.9 (80.4) | 27.3 (81.1) |
| Mean daily minimum °C (°F) | 21.3 (70.3) | 21.6 (70.9) | 22.5 (72.5) | 24.0 (75.2) | 24.2 (75.6) | 23.9 (75.0) | 23.4 (74.1) | 23.3 (73.9) | 23.4 (74.1) | 23.5 (74.3) | 23.2 (73.8) | 22.5 (72.5) | 23.1 (73.6) |
| Record low °C (°F) | 13.0 (55.4) | 14.5 (58.1) | 14.7 (58.5) | 17.9 (64.2) | 18.2 (64.8) | 18.8 (65.8) | 18.1 (64.6) | 19.0 (66.2) | 18.8 (65.8) | 18.0 (64.4) | 17.1 (62.8) | 15.1 (59.2) | 13.0 (55.4) |
| Average rainfall mm (inches) | 5.3 (0.21) | 9.4 (0.37) | 14.6 (0.57) | 40.8 (1.61) | 247.1 (9.73) | 495.3 (19.50) | 857.3 (33.75) | 929.1 (36.58) | 612.0 (24.09) | 254.6 (10.02) | 65.3 (2.57) | 20.9 (0.82) | 3,551.7 (139.83) |
| Average rainy days (≥ 1.0 mm) | 2 | 2 | 3 | 4 | 10 | 17 | 22 | 23 | 19 | 11 | 5 | 3 | 121 |
| Average relative humidity (%) | 77 | 76 | 76 | 75 | 79 | 83 | 86 | 87 | 86 | 82 | 80 | 78 | 80 |
Source: PAGASA

== Demographics ==
In the 2024 census, the population of Iba was 59,580 people, with a density of 390 inhabitants per square kilometre or 1,000 inhabitants per square mile.

Population census of Iba

| Year | Pop. | ±% p.a. |
|---|---|---|
| 1903 | 4,482 | — |
| 1918 | 5,452 | +1.31% |
| 1939 | 8,299 | +2.02% |
| 1948 | 9,741 | +1.80% |
| 1960 | 14,555 | +3.40% |
| 1970 | 19,521 | +2.98% |

| Year | Pop. | ±% p.a. |
|---|---|---|
| 1975 | 21,020 | +1.49% |
| 1980 | 22,791 | +1.63% |
| 1990 | 29,221 | +2.52% |
| 1995 | 31,503 | +1.42% |
| 2000 | 34,678 | +2.08% |
| 2007 | 44,344 | +3.45% |

| Year | Pop. | ±% p.a. |
|---|---|---|
| 2010 | 46,761 | +1.95% |
| 2015 | 50,506 | +1.48% |
| 2020 | 55,581 | +2.04% |
| 2024 | 59,580 | +1.68% |

Source: Philippine Statistics Authority

The population of Iba has become a mixture of different people over the last twenty years as opportunities in employment and business attracted people from Pangasinan, Bataan, and Batangas.

=== Languages ===
Originally, the population was composed of Sambal and Ilocano-speaking people. While Sambal and Ilocano are spoken by many of the population, Tagalog has become the common language spoken in Iba. Sambal residents have switched their language from Sambal to Ilocano and Tagalog.

=== Religion ===
The majority of the people in Iba, Zambales are Roman Catholics second was the Aglipayan Church, The largest minority religion is Iglesia ni Cristo followed by various Protestant denominations.

==== Ecclesiastical district ====
The seat of the Ecclesiastical District of Zambales North of the Iglesia ni Cristo is located in Iba. The INC district administration and district office oversees several locales and extensions from different municipalities in the northern part of Zambales province.

==== Diocese of Iba ====
The Cathedral of Iba, also known as the Cathedral of Saint Augustine, is the seat of the Roman Catholic Diocese of Iba. The church of the diocese is a 17th-century Baroque church built by the Augustinian Recollects. It is located adjacent to the Provincial Capitol Building. Currently, the appointed bishop is Bishop Bartolome G. Santos Jr. since Bishop Florentino Lavarias became the Archbishop of San Fernando, Pampanga.

== Economy ==
Poverty incidence of Iba (%)

Source: Philippine Statistics Authority

The population of Iba increases during daytime because of traders, market buyers, students, government and private employees flocking into town. There are currently two malls in the municipality, Iba Town Center Mall - the first community mall in the town, and City Supermarket, Inc. (CSI Mall). Happy Go Shopping Center is also a major shopping destination in town, with Robinsons Place Iba and WalterMart Iba being planned. Several supermarket chains including have branches in Iba. Some national government offices can also be found in Iba, such as the SSS, NBI and PhilHealth.

Iba also has a continuously growing number of commercial establishments, banks, and financial institutions.

== Tourism ==
Tourism is one of the major economic activity in Iba during the summer period. It has become a popular destination for summer vacationists and tourists due to the pristine and beautiful beaches that line the shorelines of Iba, and adventure trekking to the unique 3-series of Iba waterfalls. Its pollution-free beaches due to the absence of industrial-polluting activities in the locality, make it one of the best places in the Philippines.

In response to the growing number of both local and foreign visitors, investments in beach resorts have increased in the last fifteen years. Today there are about 50 beach resorts in Iba.

=== Festivals ===
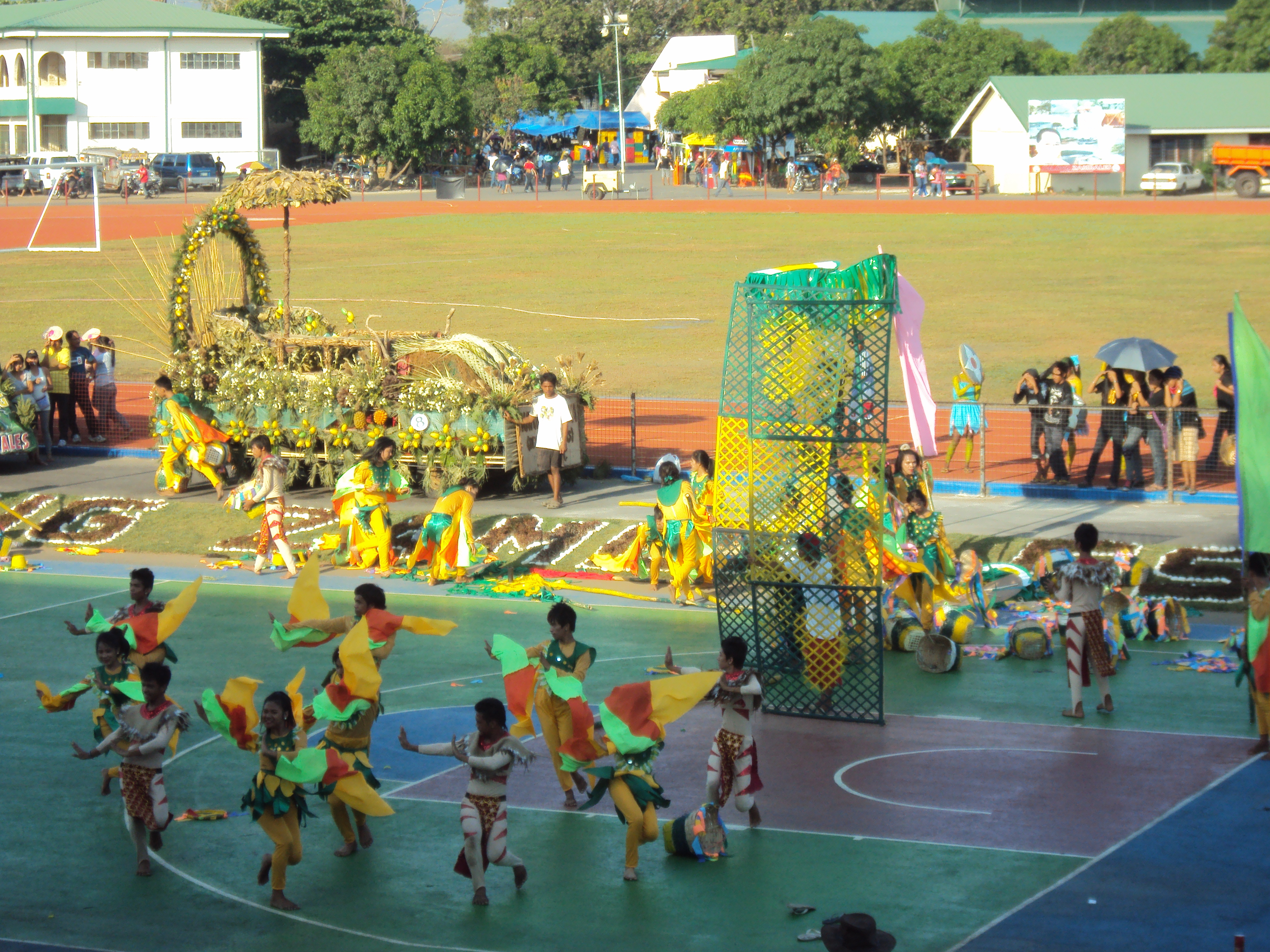
Mango Fest

Zambales Mango Festival
The festival is a celebration of a bountiful harvest of mangoes and other agricultural products which the province is known for. It is also aimed to highlight the attractions and places of interest in all of its towns. As a way of promoting and giving thanks for a good harvest, the people of Zambales annually celebrate the six-day Mango Festival in March or April in Iba.

Paynauen Festival
A summer festival in Iba featuring local traditional arts and culture first celebrated in the 1980s, Paynauen Festival (also spelled as Paynawen) has become a yearly tradition and a tourist attraction lasting for about seven days. Paynauen's festivities include street dancing, singing competition, boxing events, sports events, sand castle building, carabao race, kite flying contests, Miss Paynauen competition, cooking contest, barangay booth displays, products display and sales, ballroom dancing, traditional parade, concerts and many others.

The festival is held late April, during the summer season where thousands of visitors flock to Iba for beach activities. Led by the Iba Tourism Council, Paynauen is supported by the local government, different civic organizations, volunteers and the private business sector.

== Transportation ==
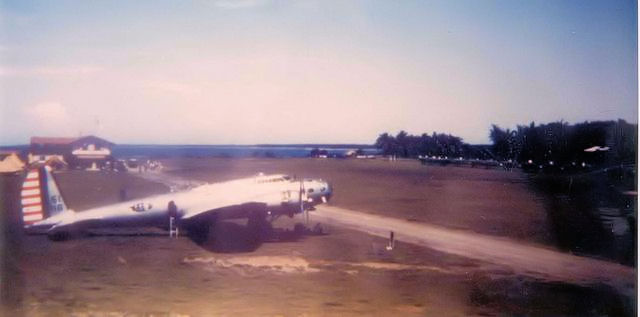
Iba Field now Iba Airport in 1941

By land
Iba is easily reached from Manila and Pangasinan by land transportation. It is 204 kilometres (127 mi) from Rizal Park in Manila via North Luzon Expressway exiting in San Fernando, Pampanga to Olongapo. From Olongapo, Iba is 78 kilometres (48 mi) away.

By air
The town can be also reached by small aircraft using the Iba Airport, a small feeder airport with a 900-metre (3,000 ft) runway located along the coast of Iba.

== Healthcare ==
The provincial government administers the President Ramon Magsaysay Memorial Hospital in Bargy. Palanginan to provide convenient medical services at a lower costs to the people of the Zambales. The hospital received a ₱50-million equipment upgrade in 2011 to better serve its patients.

The municipal government operates a Super Health Center in Brgy. Bangantalinga to improve the local healthcare system to provide adequate support in preventing diseases and early treatment of illnesses.

The Santa Cecilia Medical Center is a private institution offering one of the most complete and advance medical facilities in the province.

Saint Pio's Medical Center is also a large medical facility and a private institution located along Govic Highway in Brgy. Dirita.

== Education ==
The Iba Schools District Office governs all educational institutions within the municipality. It oversees the management and operations of all private and public, from primary to secondary schools.

=== Primary and elementary schools ===
- ADBSA Aeta School
- Amungan Elementary School
- Bangantalinga Elementary School
- Dampay Elementary School
- Dirita-Baloguen Elementary School
- Divine World Academy
- Dona Luisa Obieta Elementary School
- Iba Christian Academy
- Iba Ecumenical Learning Center
- Iba Elementary School
- Iba Kiddieland Montessori School
- Lawak Elementary School
- Libaba Elementary School
- Lipay-Dingin Elementary School
- Little Baguio Elementary School
- Lucio Abrigo Memorial Learning Center
- Lupang Pangako Resettlement School
- Marciano Abela Elementary School
- Paulo Abastillas Sr. Memorial School
- Precious Jewels Bible Baptist Academy
- San Agustin Elementary School
- St. Augustine's School
- Sta. Barbara Elementary School
- Sto. Rosario Elementary School

=== Secondary schools ===
- Zambales National High School
- Zambales National High School - Jesus F. Magsaysay High School (Annex)
- Amungan National High School
- Iba Montessori High School
- Laboratory High School (PRMSU)
- Micro Asia High School
- Saint Agustine High School
- San Agustin Integrated School
- Sta. Barbara Integrated School
- Dona Luisa Obieta Integrated School

=== Technical and vocational schools ===
- All Asia Aviation Academy is a flying school offering flight and ground training located in Iba Airport between Brgy. LDP and Brgy. Sto. Rosario.
- The provincial office of the Technical Education and Skills Development Authority (TESDA) in Zambales is located on Magsaysay Avenue. TESDA was established by the Philippine government to manage and supervise the vocational education and skills development of the country's human resources through training and scholarships.

=== Higher educational institution ===
- Hopeful Beginnings Institute
- Marasigan Technological College
- Micro Asia College of Science and Technology
- President Ramon Magsaysay State University (PRMSU), formerly Ramon Magsaysay Technological University (RMTU), is a government-funded higher education institution founded in 1910. The school was merged with two other colleges in the province in 1998 to become the present multi-campus university system. Its main campus is located in the center of Iba with satellite campuses located all over the province.

== Popular culture ==
- The American war film Apocalypse Now (shot in 1976; released in 1979) was about to be filmed by Francis Ford Coppola in Iba when Typhoon Olga (Didang) destroyed the sets constructed for production. The sets were recreated in Pagsanjan, Laguna and the beach scenes were filmed in Baler, Aurora.

== Government ==
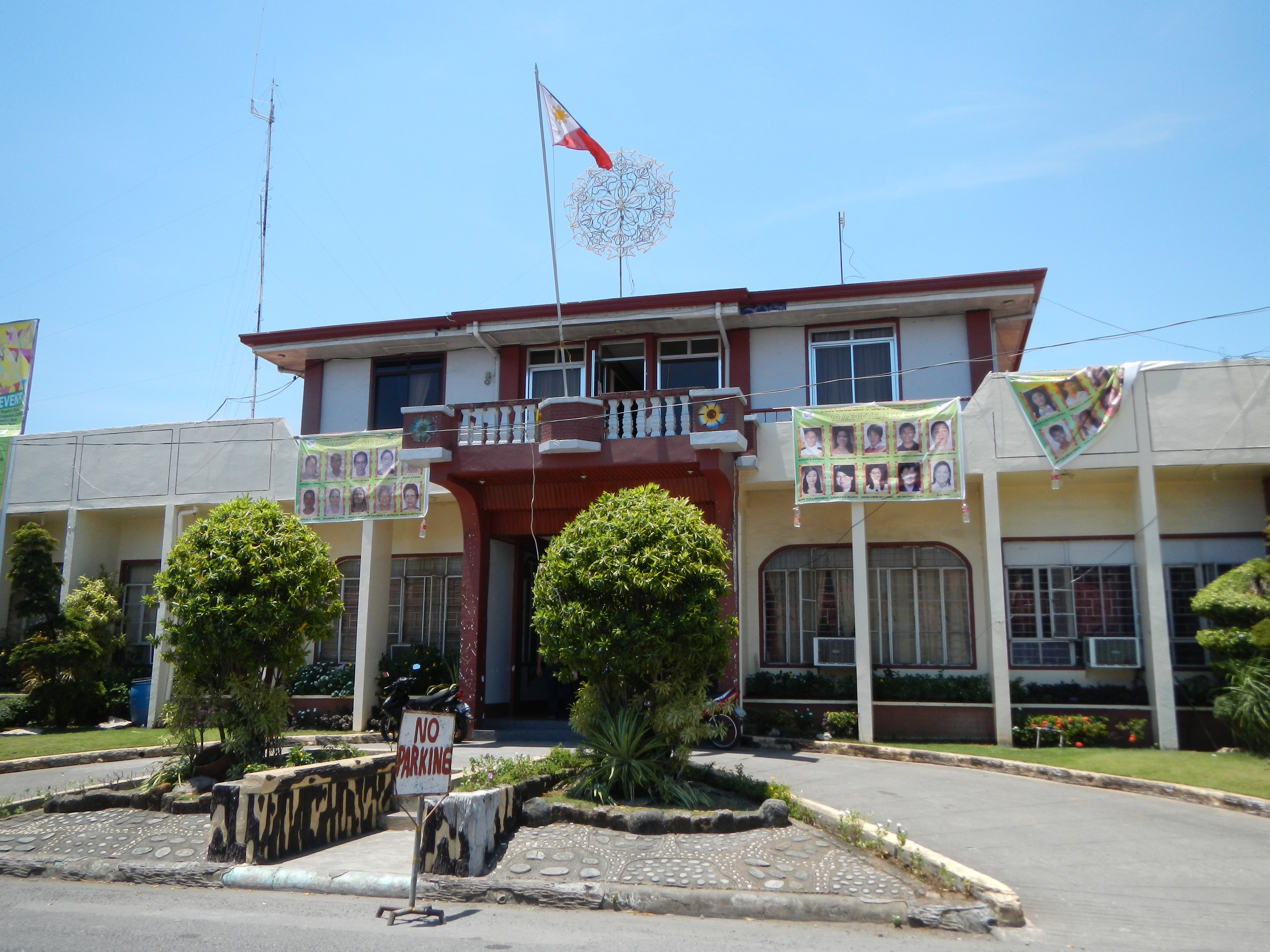
Town hall of Iba

Elected officials (2025-2028):

- Mayor: Irenea Maniquiz-Biñan (Since June 30, 2022 - 2nd term)
- Vice Mayor: Joan D. Ballesteros (Since June 30, 2022 - 2nd term)
- Member's Sangguniang Bayan:
  - Margie Maniquiz Noveno (since June 30, 2019 - 3rd term)
  - Carl Eric B. Rico (Since June 30, 2025 - 1st term)
  - Edison E. Martinez (Since June 30, 2025 - 1st term)
  - Salvador R. Redondo (Since June 30, 2025 - 1st term)
  - Raedag A. Villamin Jr. (Since June 30, 2025 - 1st term)
  - Paulo A. Fortin (since June 30, 2025 - 1st term)
  - Edgar C. Payumo (Since June 30, 2022 - 2nd term)
  - Alire John T. Fallorin (Since June 30, 2022 - 2nd term)

== Notable personalities ==
- Loi Ejercito, former first lady and senator
- Ramon Magsaysay, former Philippine President
