= Morcon =

Morcon may refer to:

- Morcón, a type of chorizo in Spanish cuisine
- Morcón (Filipino cuisine), a type of beef roulade in Filipino cuisine
- Prosafe, an owner/operator of semi-submersible accommodation and service rigs, which was originally known as Morcon
