= Christmas in the Philippines =

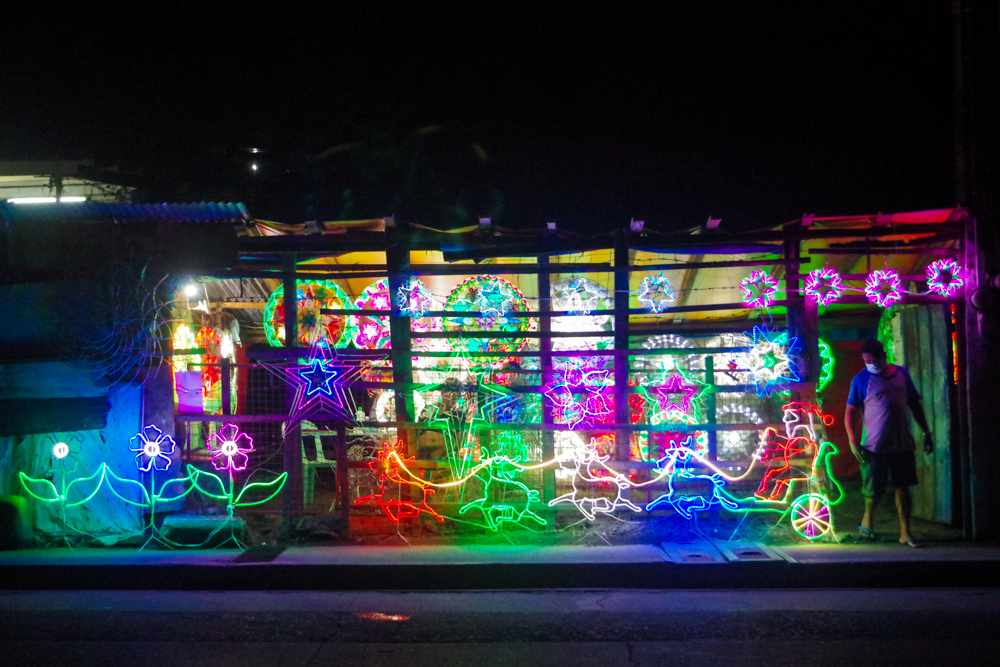
Parols and Christmas lights on display at night. The parol is regarded as one of the most recognizable symbols of the Filipino Christmas season.

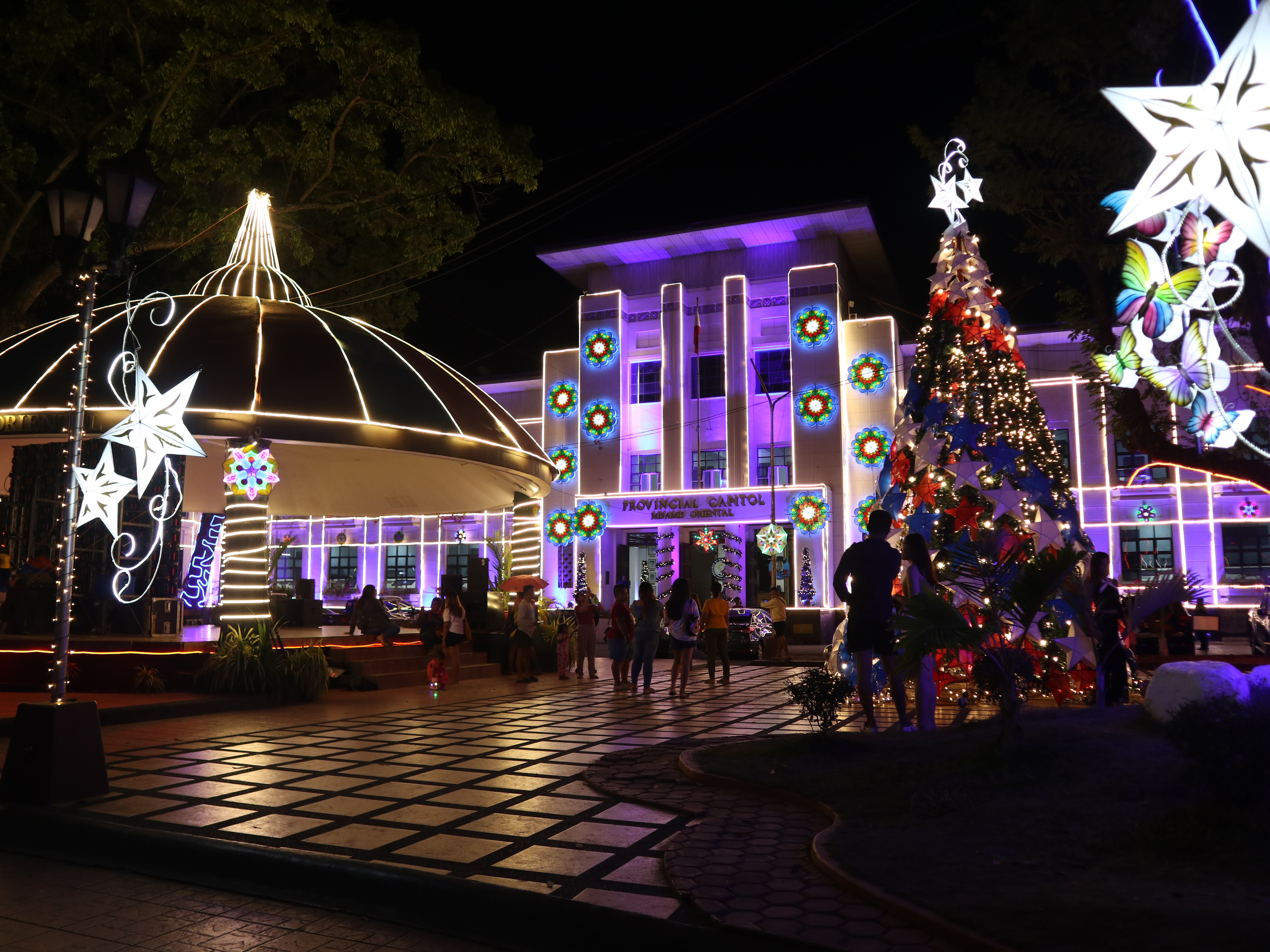
Illuminated Christmas decorations on display at the Misamis Oriental Provincial Capitol

In the Philippines, Christmas (Filipino: Pasko; [pɐsˈkɔ]) (Note: For the names of Christmas in other languages spoken in the Philippines, see § Etymology and nomenclature.) is a major annual celebration, as in most countries of the Christian world. It is observed as a public holiday on December 25, concurrent with celebrations in many other countries.

As one of the two predominantly Catholic countries in Asia (the other being Timor-Leste), the Philippines is often described as having the world's longest Christmas season (Filipino: Kapaskuhan), spanning what are colloquially referred to as the "ber months". (Note: The months ending with the -ber suffix: September, October, November, and December.) With Christmas music played and decorations displayed as early as August, the holiday season gradually begins in September, (Note: The early start to the Christmas season, as early as August, is marked by the playing of Christmas music, and decorations begin to adorn homes and public spaces.) reaches its peak in December during Christmastide, and concludes within the week after New Year's Day. (Note: In other words, the holiday season ends in the first week of January.) Festivities may also extend until the third Sunday of January with the feast of the Santo Niño. For some Catholics, the season extends even further, ending only on February 2 with the feast of the Candelaria, marked by cultural observances, religious services, and the traditional removal of decorations. Liturgically, the Christmas season is observed by the Catholic Church from the first day of Advent (the fourth Sunday before Christmas) to Three Kings' Day, which falls on the Sunday between January 2 and 8. (Note: Also known as Epiphany, generally observed on January 6 in the General Roman Calendar. However, some countries, including the Philippines, observe it between January 2 and 8.)

== Etymology and nomenclature ==
In Filipino and other Philippine languages, the word paskó commonly refers to Christmas. (Note: In the phrase Paskó ng (Muling) Pagkabuhay (lit. 'Pasch of the Resurrection'), paskó means "Pasch" or "Easter", although the fuller borrowing Paskuwa is more commonly used to refer to Easter. When used alone in Tagalog, Cebuano, and Bikol, paskó refers exclusively to Christmas. Paskuwa and paskó are doublets.) It derives from the Spanish phrase pascua de navidad (lit. 'Easter of the Nativity'); the latter part, de navidad, fell out of use, leaving the word pascua to be assimilated into local languages over the years. The Spanish word pascua ultimately derives from Latin pascha, which was borrowed from Ancient Greek πάσχα (páskha), meaning "Passover". (Note: Ancient Greek πάσχα (páskha) was itself borrowed from Aramaic פסחא (paskha), which in turn came from Hebrew פסח (pésakh).) The word was further shortened through the dropping of the final "a", leading to the archaic spelling Pasco and its modern form, Pasko.

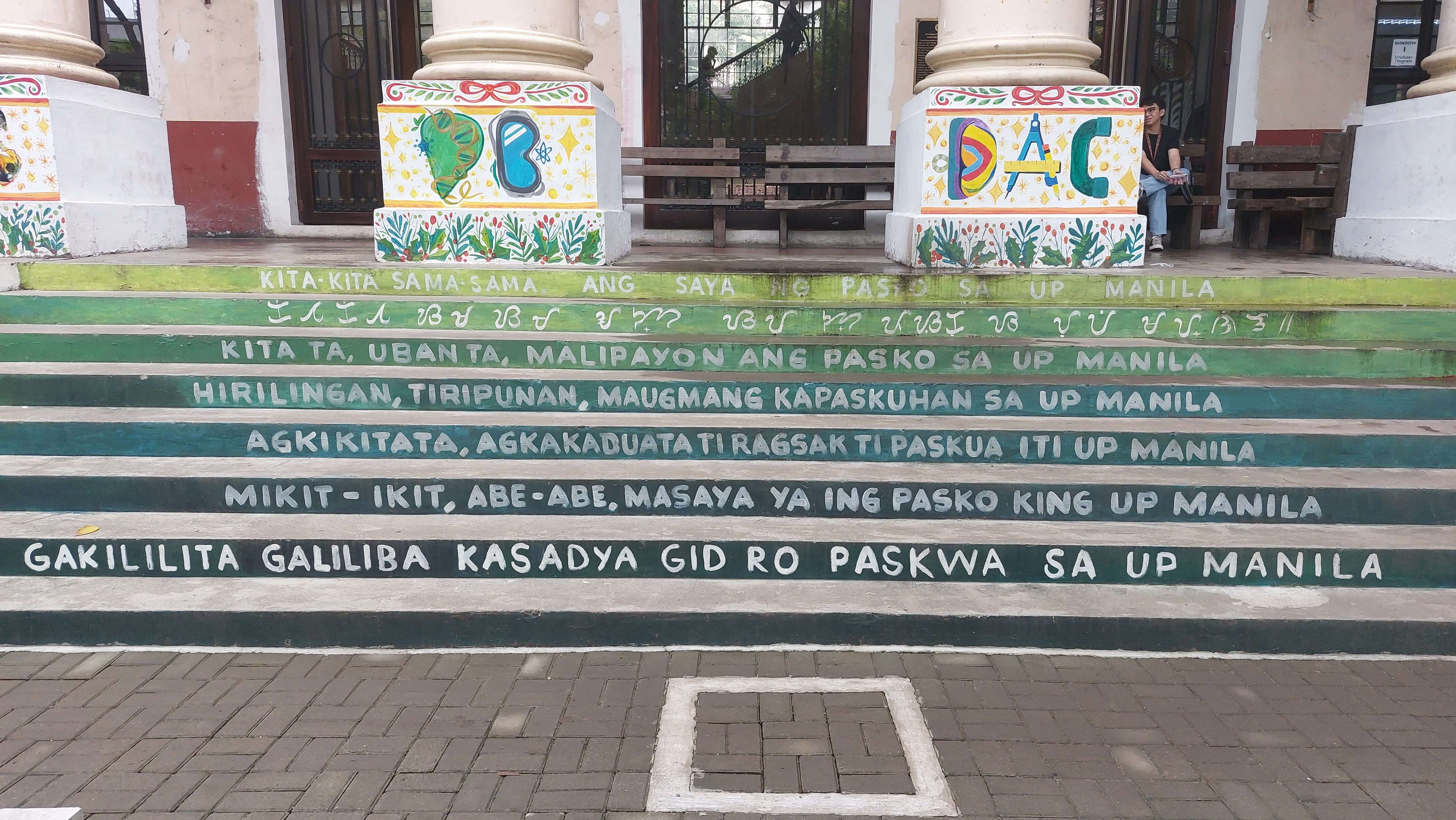
Staircases at UP Manila with greetings in several Philippine languages, roughly saying "[Let us] meet and join. Christmas is fun at UP Manila."

In Kapampangan, Pasko is spelled Pasku or Pascu, the latter reflecting the language's Spanish-based orthography. In other languages spoken in the country, including Chavacano (a Spanish-based creole), Hiligaynon, and Ilocano, the Spanish-derived word pascua remains in use, although its spelling may vary. (Note: For example, in the aforementioned Hiligaynon and Ilocano languages, it is spelled Paskwa and Paskua, respectively.) Krismas, a Filipinized rendering of English Christmas, is also occasionally used in informal contexts. Christmas Day is called Araw ng Pasko and Christmas Eve Bisperas ng Pasko (from Spanish vísperas). In the Pangasinan language, Inkianac (meaning "birth") is also used alongside Pasko. Conversely, navidad survived in the Bolinao language in the form of Abidad.

Several Filipino Christmas-related terms are derived from paskó, including Kapaskuhán (Christmas season), namamaskó (a caroller), pamamaskó (the act of caroling), pamaskó (Christmas gift), and pampaskó or pang-Paskó (lit. 'for Christmas', often referring to clothing worn for the holiday).

Pamamaskó also refers to the practice in which children visit relatives, godparents, and family friends during Christmas, offering greetings and songs in exchange for gifts of money or food. The custom usually takes place after attending Christmas Day Mass.

== History ==
=== Legendary accounts ===
The earliest claims of a Christmas celebration in what is now the Philippines come from a widely disputed legend involving an Italian Franciscan missionary named Odoric. According to the account, Odoric and his companions were blown off course by a storm and landed in present-day Bolinao, Pangasinan, where they were said to have preached to the inhabitants and celebrated a Catholic Mass on December 25, 1324. Later retellings claim that he baptized locals and planted a cross at the site, while others added the detail of a Christmas tree–an anachronism, as this custom would not even become common in Europe until the 19th century.

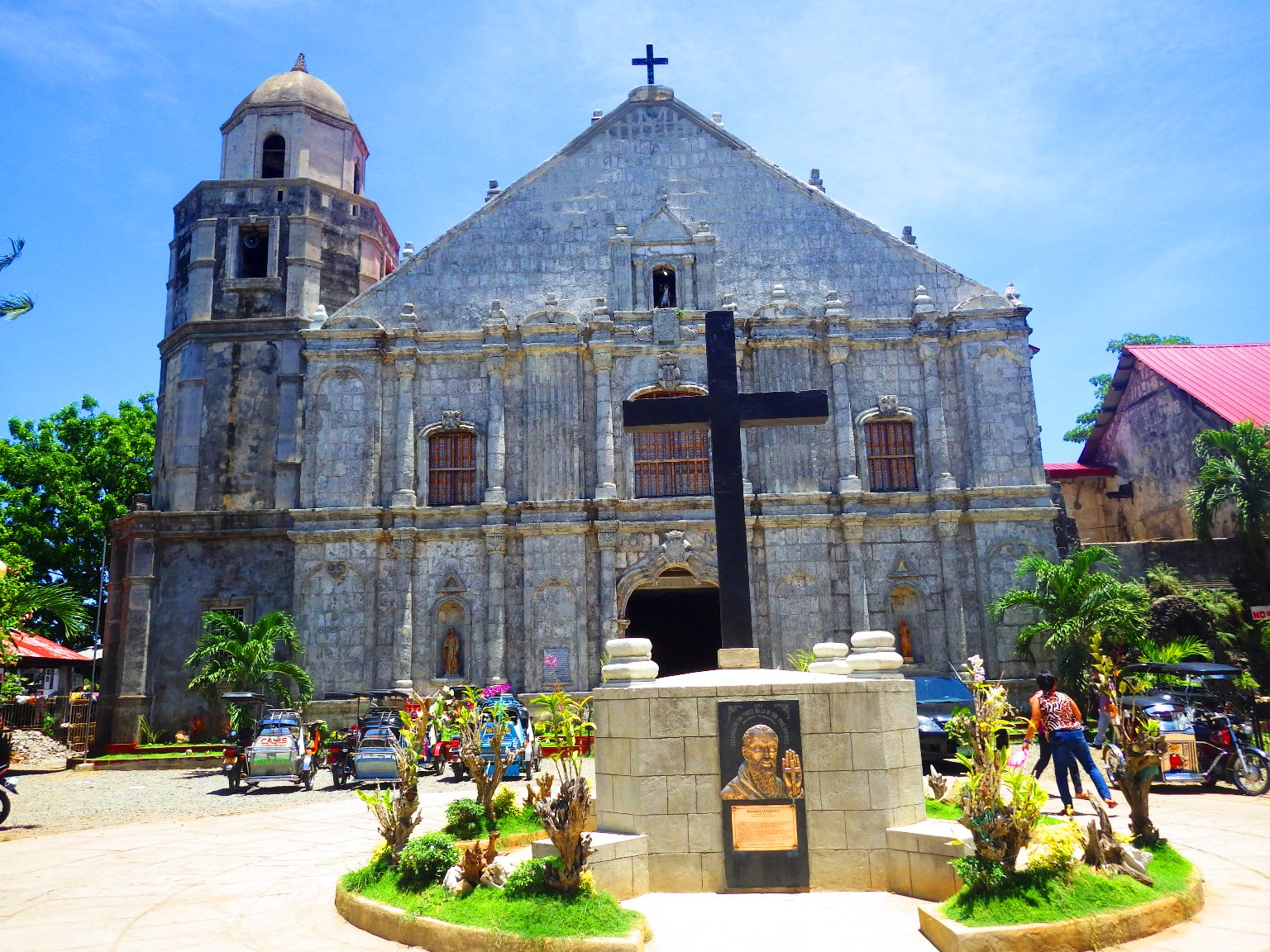
Bolinao Church, with a plaque in front marking Odoric's alleged 1324 Mass

Historians such as Ambeth Ocampo and William Henry Scott have dismissed the account as lacking credible evidence. Notwithstanding scholarly rejection, a plaque was installed in 2007 at Bolinao Church, claiming that Odoric celebrated a Mass there in 1324. The National Historical Commission of the Philippines (NHCP) and the Catholic Bishops' Conference of the Philippines (CBCP) officially recognize the 1521 Easter Sunday Mass in Mazaua (present Limasawa, Southern Leyte) as the earliest documented Catholic Mass in the archipelago.

=== Precolonial era ===
Before the introduction of Christianity in the 16th century, the peoples of the precolonial Philippines, neither unified into a single polity nor governed by a centralized authority, observed seasonal rituals tied to agricultural calendars and indigenous animist beliefs. Celebrations honoring deities and ancestral spirits often coincided with planting and harvest cycles, featuring communal feasts, offerings, and music. Under Spanish colonial rule, many of these communal rites of feasting and procession were appropriated into Christian celebrations, and pre-Hispanic rituals were gradually supplanted by Catholic observances. Scholars have described this as a process of syncretism, suggesting that the integration of indigenous and Christian practices influenced the communal aspects of later Filipino Christmas traditions.

=== Spanish colonial period ===
The first documented Christmas celebration in the Philippines took place in December 1565 at Fort San Pedro, Cebu, shortly after Miguel López de Legazpi established the first permanent Spanish settlement there. As the Spanish consolidated their presence in the archipelago, Catholicism became a central part of Filipino religious life. Over time, indigenous beliefs merged with Christian practices, resulting in distinctively Filipino expressions of the holiday.

One of the most enduring Filipino Christmas traditions is Simbang Gabi (Tagalog for "night Mass"), a series of nine dawn Masses held from December 16 to 24 in anticipation of Christmas. The earliest recorded observance of this practice, known as the Misa de Aguinaldo ("gift Mass"), dates back to 1668, as documented by the Jesuit Francisco Ignacio Alcina in his writings on the Visayas.

The tradition originated in Spain and spread to Latin America before being brought to the Philippines by Mexican missionaries through the Manila galleon trade. It was initially celebrated before midnight, but by the 18th century it was rescheduled to early dawn so that farmers could attend Mass before beginning work in the fields. This adjustment gave rise to the alternative name Misa de Gallo ("rooster's Mass"), as the services coincided with the crowing of roosters at daybreak. Prior to this change, worshippers were obliged to fast until midnight and could only break their fast after attending Mass.

Over the centuries, Simbang Gabi has developed into both a religious and cultural practice. Churches are decorated with lights and traditional parol (star-shaped lanterns), while vendors sell native delicacies such as bibingka and puto bumbong to Mass-goers after the service. Completing all nine Masses is popularly believed to bring special blessings or the granting of wishes.

After the final Mass on Christmas Eve, families traditionally gather for nochebuena (Spanish for "night of goodness"), a midnight feast that typically includes ham, roasted meats, rice cakes, and desserts. Rooted in Spanish colonial custom, the nochebuena meal is both religious and social, serving as both a family gathering and the beginning of the Christmas celebration.

=== American colonial period ===
After the transfer of sovereignty from Spain to the United States in 1898, Christmas in the Philippines began to incorporate secular and commercial elements. American influence introduced the widespread use of Christmas cards, Christmas trees, Santa Claus, and English-language carols. Department stores in Manila later became well known for festive window displays to attract Christmas shoppers, while the spread of American-style public education and English-language media introduced Western Christmas symbols such as Santa Claus, Christmas trees, and carols, which blended with traditional observances like Simbang Gabi and nochebuena.

During World War II, particularly under Japanese occupation (1942–1945), Christmas celebrations in the Philippines were severely limited. Blackouts, martial restrictions, and food shortages reduced festivities, although religious services and modest family gatherings continued. At the Santo Tomas Internment Camp in Manila, internees marked Christmas with prayers and shared rations, and occasionally received Red Cross parcels that included items such as butter and chocolate, which provided rare holiday relief.

=== Postwar and contemporary period ===
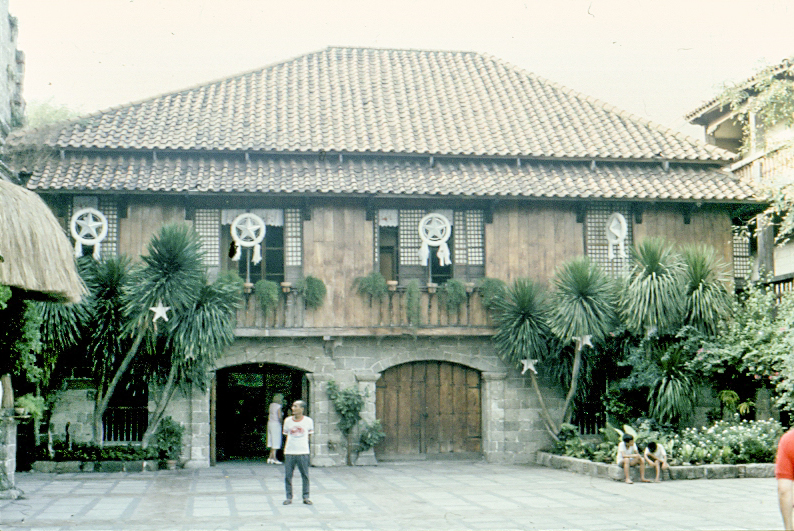
A house in Manila with Christmas decorations in December 1982

In the decades following independence in 1946, Christmas celebrations expanded further, with the holiday season lengthening to encompass the entire "ber months" beginning in September. The mass production of parols and the annual Ligligan Parul (Giant Lantern Festival) in San Fernando, Pampanga, popularized in the postwar years, earned the city the title of "Christmas Capital of the Philippines". Television and film further popularized Christmas imagery, while Filipino composers such as José Mari Chan became closely associated with the season in contemporary culture.

The period also saw a diversification of observances beyond Christmas Day itself. The feast of the Epiphany on January 6, commonly called Three Kings' Day, formed part of the extended season, though its liturgical celebration in the Philippines was transferred to the Sunday after January 1 following the 1969 revision of the General Roman Calendar, in line with the practice of many other countries. In the Visayas, the Sinulog, Ati-Atihan, and Dinagyang festivals honor the Santo Niño in January, extending the Christmas season with large religious processions and street celebrations.

In the late 20th and early 21st centuries, the Christmas season in the Philippines came to be regarded as the longest in the world, with festive music, decorations, and shopping promotions beginning as early as September (and sometimes August) and continuing until the Feast of the Santo Niño in mid-January.

== Observances and traditions ==
In the Philippines, where the population is predominantly Catholic, (Note: As of the 2015 census, Roman Catholics made up 79.53% of the population; other Christian denominations accounted for 9.13%.) Christmas is celebrated for nearly half the year, from September to January, widely regarded as among the longest in the world. (Note: The early start of Christmas preparations (including countdown to Christmas) and celebrations, as early as August, is a distinctive feature of the Filipino Christmas season. This extended celebration is characterized by a variety of activities, including the playing of Christmas music, putting up decorations, and organizing community events.) This prolonged celebration is characterized by both festive and religious elements, as Filipinos combine festive activities with solemn religious practices. Under Philippine law, both Christmas Eve (December 24) and Christmas Day (December 25) are respectively classified as special and regular non-working holidays.

Filipino Christmas traditions are a mix of native, Hispanic, and American practices, with celebrations emphasizing kinship and the nativity of Jesus. Beyond food and family gatherings, the holiday season features lanterns, decorations, and music, which reflect both religious devotion and communal joy. These elements are often cited in media and cultural commentary as distinct features of a Filipino Christmas. Due to commercialization and secularization, figures such as Santa Claus have also become more mainstream.

While widely embraced as a cultural tradition, the extended season has also drawn criticism for excessive commercialization and holiday fatigue. Commentators have described the phenomenon as "bariotic," a colloquial term for a grassroots, exuberantly festive celebration. The Catholic Church has stated that the liturgical season of Christmas should only be observed from the first day of Advent until the feast of the Epiphany or Three Kings' Day. Religious leaders emphasize that the deeper meaning of Christmas in the Philippines is rooted in faith, family, and community solidarity. The early start of Christmas observances has given rise to the popular term "ber months" for September through December.

=== Religious practices ===
==== Simbang Gabi and Misa de Gallo ====
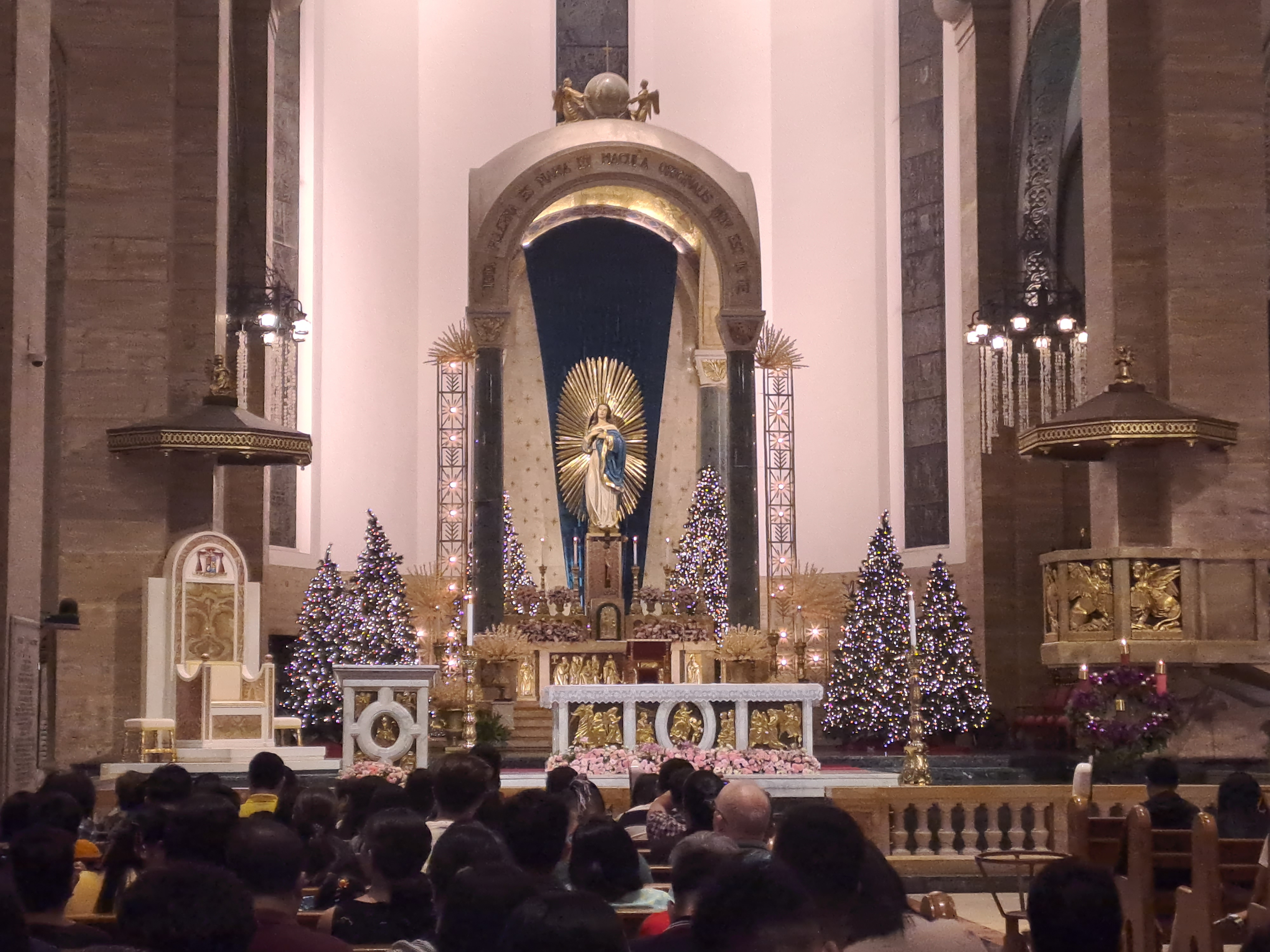
The altar of Manila Cathedral adorned with Christmas trees for Simbang Gabi

Simbang Gabi (literally, "night Mass") is a novena of dawn Masses held from December 16 to 24 (Christmas Eve). It is primarily observed by Catholics and Aglipayans, though some Evangelical and independent Protestant churches have adopted pre-Christmas dawn services. Attendance expresses devotion to God and anticipation for the nativity of Jesus, and folk belief holds that completing all nine Masses grants a special wish.

Masses typically begin around 4:30 am, though some start as early as 3:00 am or as late as 6:00 am. Many parishes also hold anticipated evening Masses around 8:00 pm or 9:00 pm to accommodate modern schedules, with some beginning as early as 5:00 pm. The novena concludes with the Misa de Gallo, the traditional midnight Mass on Christmas Eve, held just before the nochebuena family feast.

==== Panunulúyan ====
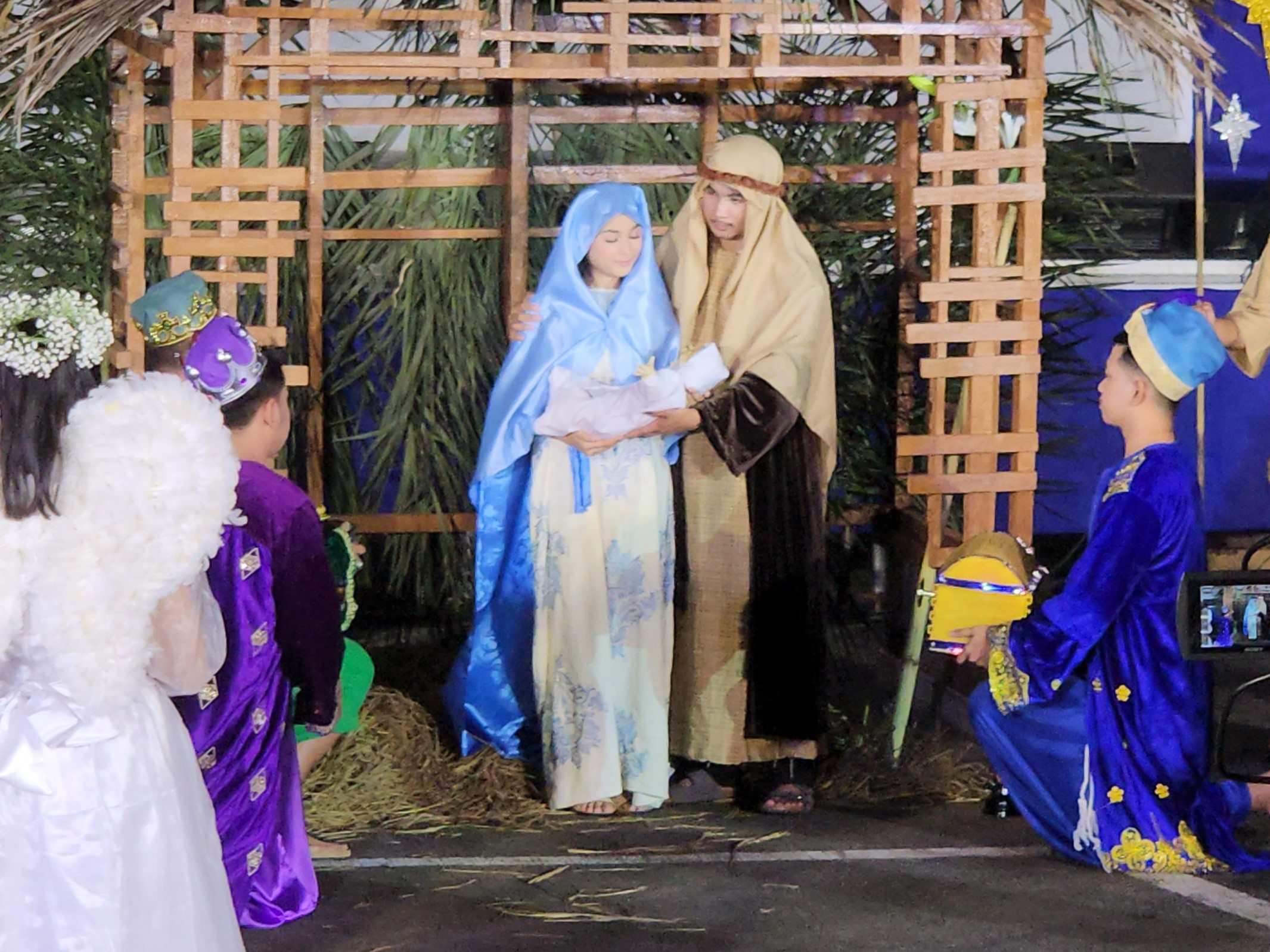
Panunulúyan in Ibaan, Batangas

The staging of nativity plays, known locally as Panunulúyan or Panunulúyan sa Pasko, is another traditional element of Filipino Christmas. These dramatizations reenact the story of Mary and Joseph's search for lodging in Bethlehem, culminating in the birth of Jesus. They are commonly held on Christmas Eve before the Misa de Gallo or integrated into community pageants, blending Christian devotion with folk performance traditions.

In different provinces and communities, the journey of Joseph and the pregnant Virgin Mary in search of lodging is re-enacted in a traditional pageant called the Panunulúyan (also variously called pananawagan, pananapatan, or kagharong in some areas). The pageant is related to Las Posadas and is usually performed on Christmas Eve, with actors portraying Joseph and Mary going from house to house and requesting lodging; householders acting as innkeepers then refuse them until the procession reaches the parish church, where a replica stable (belén) is set up and the celebration proceeds into the midnight Mass (Misa de Gallo).

==== Christmas Eve ====
For Catholic Filipinos, Christmas Eve (Bisperas ng Pasko) on December 24 is celebrated with panuluyan (a play that reenacts the scene of Virgin Mary and Saint Joseph finding a suitable place to give birth to their son Jesus), Midnight Mass, and the traditional nochebuena feast. Family members traditionally gather for nochebuena, a midnight feast featuring dishes such as queso de bola (red-waxed Edam cheese), tsokolate, pancit or pasta, fruit salad, pandesal, relyeno, and hamon (Christmas ham). Some families also open presents during or after the Noche Buena feast.

==== Christmas Day ====
Christmas Day (Araw ng Pasko) in the Philippines is primarily a family affair. Filipinos traditionally visit extended family on this day, especially to pay respects to senior relatives. This custom, called págmamáno, involves taking the back of an elder's hand and pressing it against the forehead while saying máno, pô (lit. '[Your] hand, please'). The elder usually responds with a blessing and may give aguinaldo in the form of money or gifts, often in a sealed envelope. It is customary for godparents to give aguinaldo to their godchildren, often larger than what is given to other younger relatives.

==== Post-Christmas celebrations ====
===== Feast of the Holy Family =====
After the Christmas Eve and Day celebrations, the feast of the Holy Family is observed every final Sunday (Sabbath of the Roman Catholic) of December and the year, and within the Octave of Christmas. If Christmas Day and New Year's Day fall on Sundays, December 30 is marked as the Feast of the Holy Family.

===== Niños Inocentes =====
The feast of the Holy Innocents, also known as Holy Innocents Day, Childermas, or colloquially as Niños Inocentes, is observed on December 28. In the Philippines, the day has traditionally been marked by the playing of practical jokes, similar to April Fools' Day. A common prank involves borrowing money without intending to repay it, often followed by the exclamation Na-Niños Inocentes ka! (lit. 'You have been made a Holy Innocent!'; i.e., transl. You have been tricked for Holy Innocents' Day!).

===== New Year's Eve and New Year's Day =====
New Year's Eve and New Year's Day are major events within the Christmas season in the Philippines. On December 31, families gather for the medianoche (lit. 'good night'), a midnight feast traditionally set with twelve round fruits for good fortune and dishes such as pancit for long life; sticky rice treats like biko are also served, which are associated with family togetherness. At midnight, people make noise with firecrackers, horns, and kitchenware to drive away evil spirits, with authorities now promoting designated community fireworks displays, the long-running "Iwas Paputok" safety campaigns, and other safer alternatives to reduce injuries and air pollution. Many attend a Mass on New Year's Eve or New Year's Day; January 1 is observed in the Catholic Church as the Solemnity of Mary, Mother of God, a holy day of obligation in many dioceses worldwide. (Note: The Solemnity of Mary, Mother of God, is celebrated on the eighth day of the Octave of Christmas, which connects it liturgically to the Christmas season.) Major cities and communities host countdown concerts, fireworks displays, and public festivities that usher in the new year while continuing the extended holiday period.

===== Three Kings' Day =====
Christmas in the Philippines officially ends on the feast of the Epiphany, more commonly known as Three Kings' Day and also referred to as Pasko ng Matatanda ("Feast of the Elderly") in some areas. It falls currently on the first Sunday after New Year's Day. The Hispanic custom of children leaving their shoes out to receive small gifts from the Three Kings is still observed in some communities, though it has been noted as a declining tradition.

===== Feast of the Black Nazarene =====
Forming part of the extended holiday is the January 9 Feast of the Black Nazarene, held as a national festivity with Quiapo in Manila being the main focus, as the date is the traditional anniversary of the 1787 arrival of a copy of the original Intramuros image to Quiapo Church from what is now Rizal Park, termed the Traslacion. It is the local version of the widely popular Feast of the Lord of Miracles marked every October in Peru. Since 2024, its long time defacto status, a fact given the spread of the devotion from the capital to areas across the nation over the centuries, as well as to Overseas Filipinos, is now a dejure Catholic feast due to the recognition of the Catholic Bishops' Conference of the Philippines per the requests of the Quiapo clergy and the Archdiocese of Manila.

Since the Gospel and readings of the day come from the Feast of the Exaltation of the Cross held on September 14 (which is part of the extended season or the "Ber months" period), it is a bridge that links Philippine Christmas to Lent, Holy Week and Easter, the second being one of the more awaited holidays of the year, tying thus the Christmas festivities and the latter three as a connection of the future destiny of the Holy Child born on Christmas as the one who would in latter life suffer, die and rise again.

Celebrations of the feast involve Masses and massive processions in Manila and other major cities, as well as local areas wherein replica images of the Black Nazarene are brought out.

===== Feast of the Santo Niño =====
The latest date for the end of popular Christmas celebrations is the feast of the Santo Niño on the third Sunday of January. This day commemorates the first Christian icon brought to the islands and is celebrated with major festivals nationwide, including the Sinulog in Cebu, the Ati-Atihan in Aklan, and the Dinagyang in Iloilo.

===== Feast of Our Lady of Candelaria =====
In older traditions, the Christmas season lasted until February 2, also known as Candlemas, which marked the Feast of the Purification of Mary and the Presentation of the Baby Jesus at the Temple. This final celebration is marked by the feast of Our Lady of Candelaria in Jaro, Iloilo City, where the image is enshrined in Jaro Cathedral.

=== Cultural and social traditions ===
==== Cuisine ====
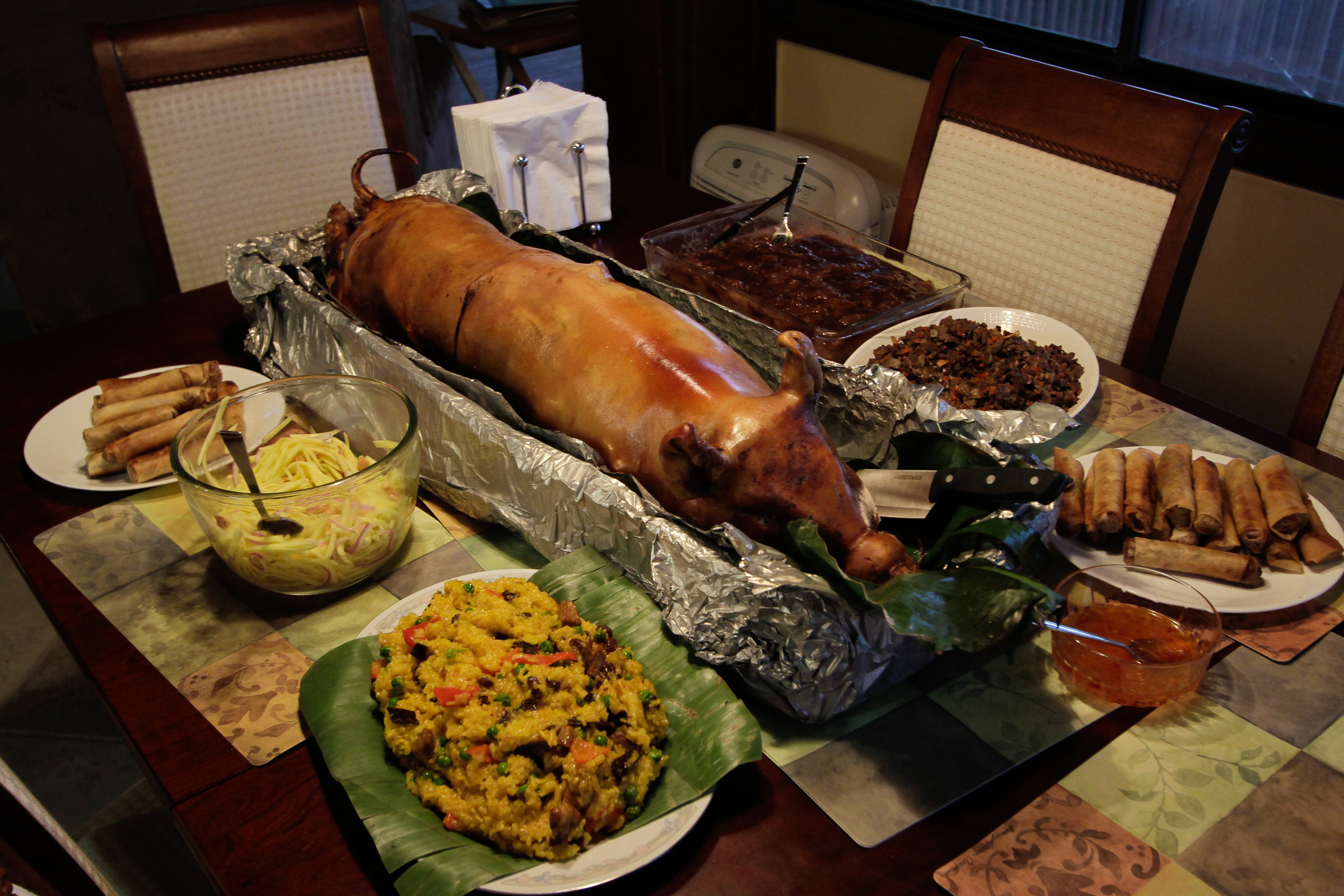
Typical traditional nochebuena meal in the Philippines, with a lechon as the centerpiece

Traditional Filipino Christmas cuisine combines Spanish influence with local flavors and regional specialties. During nochebuena, families typically serve roasted meats such as lechon and hamon (Christmas ham), alongside other elaborate dishes like embutido (meatloaf), morcon (stuffed meat roll), hamonado (sweet pork or chicken), Filipino spaghetti, pancit, and festive rice dishes such as bringhe, paelya, or arroz a la valenciana. Some households also prepare chicken relleno, callos (stewed tripe), kare-kare (peanut-based oxtail stew), and cold cuts or cheese platters with queso de bola (Edam cheese). Creative modern takes on these classics, such as queso de bola cheesecake, have become increasingly popular.

Sweet delicacies are commonly associated with the celebration. Bibingka and puto bumbong are well-known foods during Simbang Gabi, sold outside churches and served with butter, sugar, and grated coconut. Other seasonal favorites include suman (sticky rice wrapped in banana leaves), tupig (grilled sticky rice cake), maja blanca (coconut pudding), buko or fruit salad, leche flan, ube halaya (purple yam jam), and pianono (sponge roll cake). These are often paired with hot drinks such as tsokolate (thick hot chocolate) or salabat (ginger tea) served after midnight mass or during family gatherings.

Regional and modern variations add diversity to the holiday table. Lumpiang Shanghai (fried spring rolls) and party-style finger foods are common, as are local specialties like Ilocano tinubong (rice cake cooked in bamboo), Pangasinan kakanin, and Kapampangan bringhe. Contemporary households may incorporate international dishes such as roast turkey, baked macaroni, or desserts like tiramisu and cheesecake, reflecting evolving tastes while retaining traditional staples. Grocery stores and markets stock seasonal staples such as prepared hams, queso de bola, wine, and imported sweets to meet demand in the months leading up to Christmas.

==== Family and social customs ====
===== Gift giving =====
Gift giving is a central part of the Filipino Christmas season, deeply rooted in family and social traditions. Presents are commonly exchanged during nochebuena or on Christmas Day, with godparents (the male ninong and female ninang) traditionally giving inaanaks (godchildren) pamasko or aguinaldo (cash gifts) during family visits. Corporate and community gatherings often feature gift exchanges, raffles, and donation drives for those in need.

Another widespread festive practice is Monito-Monita, the Filipino version of Secret Santa. The name is widely derived from the Spanish words for "little brother" (monito) and "little sister" (monita), often used affectionately to mean "buddy" or "friend". However, the terms monito and monita also literally translate to "little monkey" in Spanish, an interpretation sometimes linked to the tradition's playful and secretive nature. Commonly observed in schools, offices, and community groups, this tradition involves participants drawing names and anonymously giving small gifts to their assigned person, with identities revealed only at the end during a holiday gathering. The practice often includes playful themes (for example, "something soft", "something sweet", or "something useful") used to guide gift choices.

===== Family reunions =====
Christmas is also a time for family reunions, with extended relatives gathering during the holidays. These reunions often feature games, talent shows, gift exchanges, and large communal meals, reinforcing kinship ties and intergenerational connections.

=== Symbols and media ===
==== Decorations ====
Filipino Christmas decorations are a mix of traditional and secular symbols. The country retains its local decorations while incorporating elements such as Santa Claus, Christmas trees, tinsel, snowman, faux evergreens, reindeer, and snow, which have become popular due to secularization. Christmas lights are also used in various ways, from festoons and star shapes to draping entire houses.

===== Parol =====
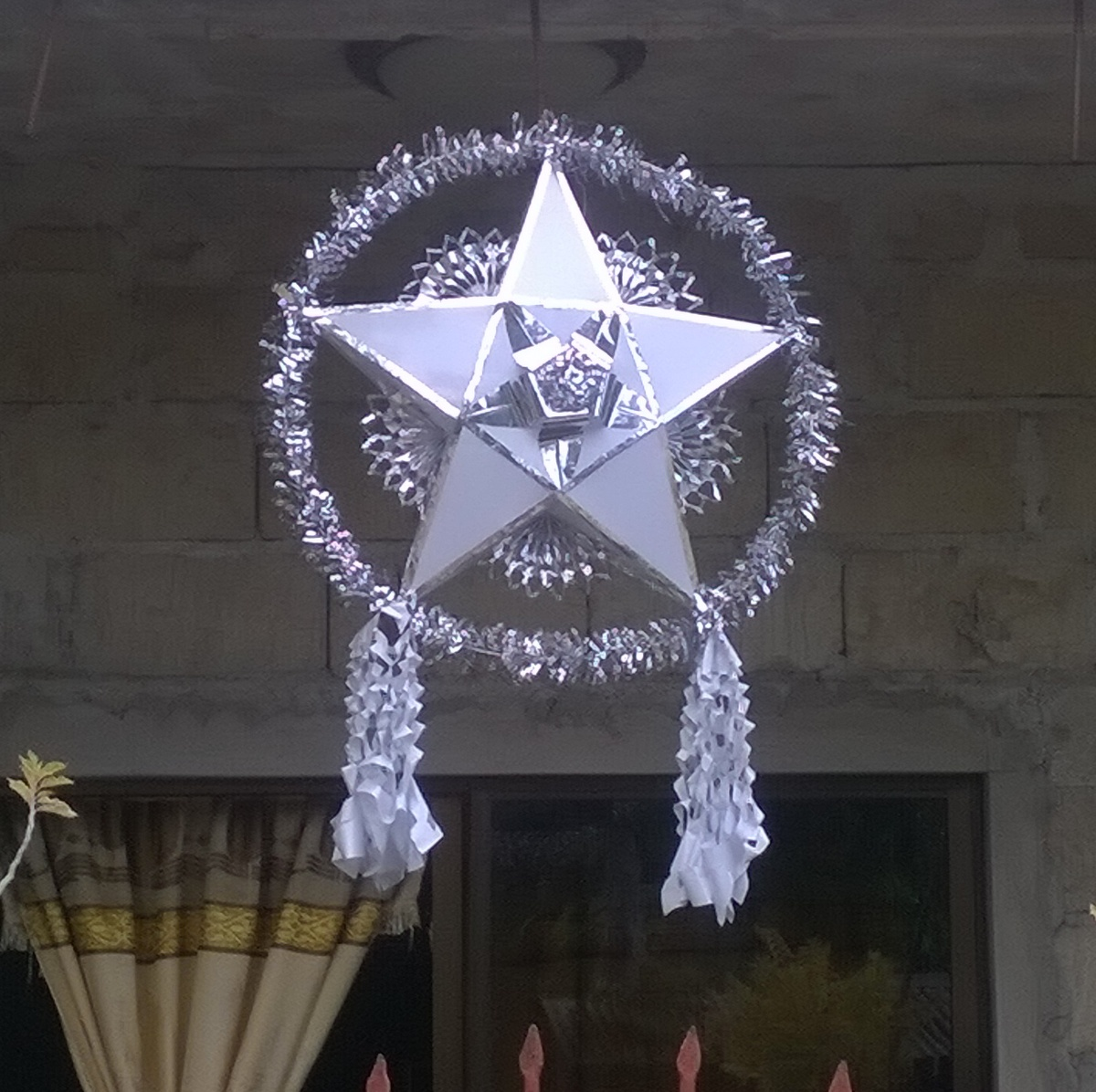
A traditional parol on a house as Christmas decoration

The parol, a star-shaped lantern symbolizing the Star of Bethlehem, is one of the most iconic Filipino Christmas decorations. The word derives from Spanish farol ("lantern" or "lamp"). Early parols were made with bamboo frames and Japanese paper (papel de Japón), lit by candles or coconut oil lamps, and often featured a five-pointed star with tails or tassels. Over time, designs became more elaborate and incorporated crêpe paper, colored cellophane, and eventually capiz shells, plastic, and electric lighting.

Parol-making remains a major craft industry in Pampanga, especially in San Fernando, where the annual Giant Lantern Festival (Ligligan Parul) showcases massive, motorized lanterns with synchronized lights and music. These events support local artisans and have turned San Fernando into the "Christmas Capital of the Philippines". Parols are also produced for export and have become symbols of Filipino identity for overseas communities.

===== Belen =====
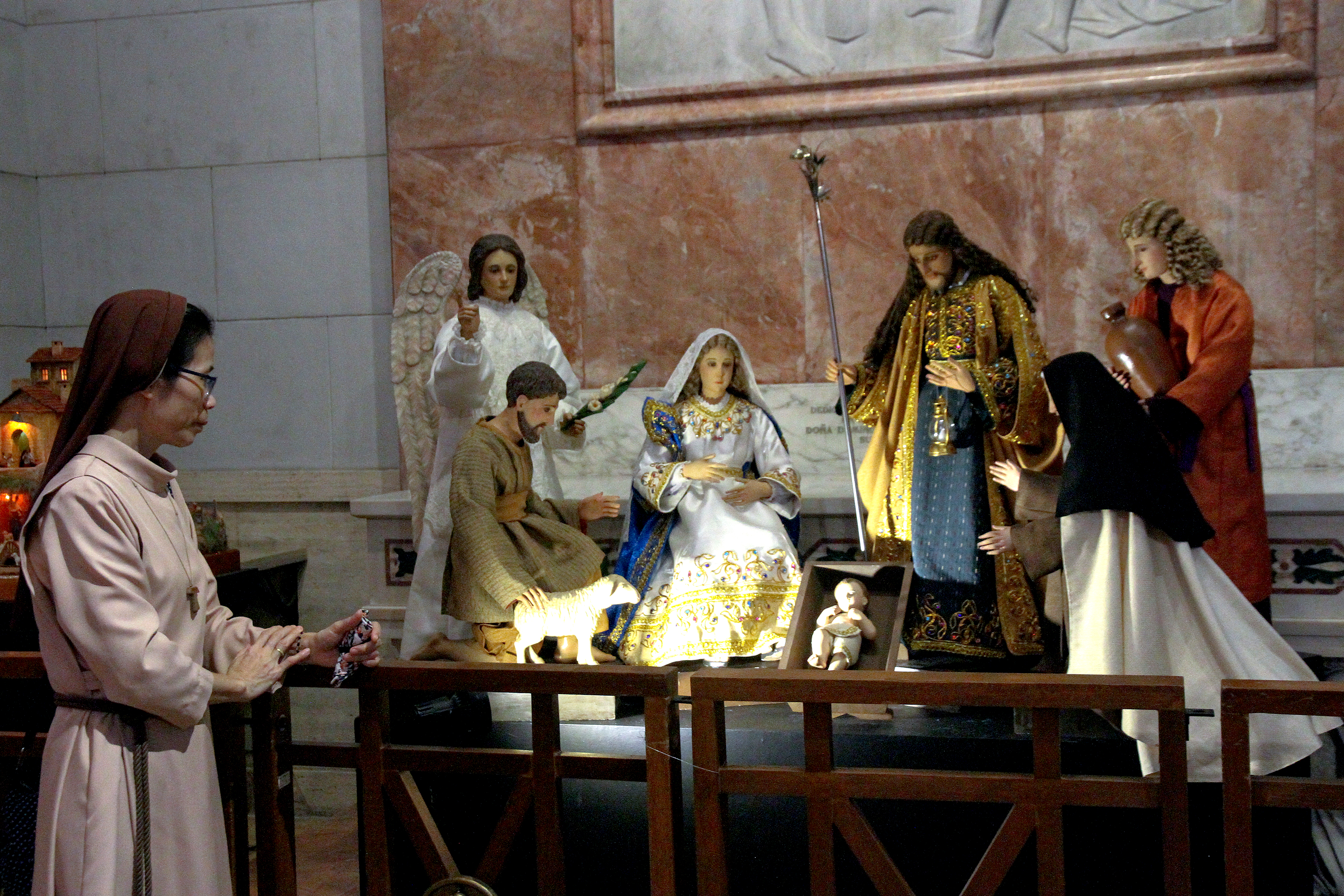
A Catholic nun looking at a belen inside Manila Cathedral in Intramuros, Manila

Another widespread Filipino Christmas symbol is the belen, a nativity scene depicting the birth of Christ. The name derives from the Spanish word for Bethlehem, Belén. A belen typically shows the infant Jesus in the manger with the Virgin Mary, St. Joseph, shepherds, Magi, angels, and stable animals, often illuminated by a parol representing the Star of Bethlehem. Both the belen and parol predate the introduction of the Christmas tree during the American colonial period.

Belens were introduced by the Spanish in the 16th century and remain a central feature of Christmas in the Philippines. They are displayed in homes, churches, schools, offices, and public spaces, with many churches transforming their altars into nativity scenes. A notable outdoor belen was the mechanized display at the COD Department Store, first in Manila (1952) and later in Cubao, Quezon City. It became a popular Christmas attraction before being transferred to the Greenhills Shopping Center in 2003 after COD's closure in 2002, and eventually returned to Cubao in 2018.

In Tarlac City, the annual "Belenismo sa Tarlac" promotes belen-making contests among residents and institutions, earning the city recognition as the "Belen Capital of the Philippines".

==== Music and carols ====
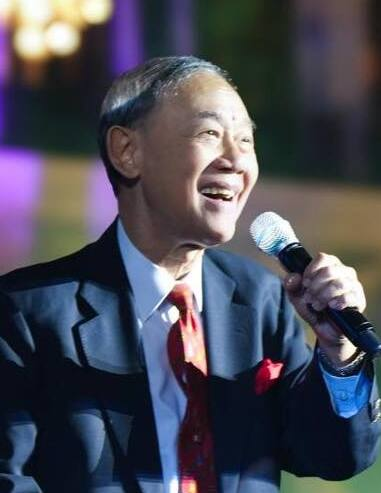
Jose Mari Chan is widely regarded as the "Father of Philippine Christmas Music" for his contributions to the popular genre.

Music is a central part of the Filipino Christmas season, with carols often heard as early as August. Street carolers, typically groups of children, go house to house singing in exchange for coins, a practice rooted in pamamasko. This tradition serves not only as a form of merrymaking but also as a way for poorer communities to raise money.

A duality exists between traditional and popular songs. Traditional carols and compositions, often with religious or classic caroling themes, are cultural staples performed in churches and community gatherings. These include "Ang Pasko ay Sumapit" (lit. 'Christmas has come'), originally composed in Cebuano as "Kasadya ning Táknaa" by Vicente Rubi and Mariano Vestil in 1933 and later adapted by Levi Celerio; "Sa Maybahay Ang Aming Bati" (lit. 'To the homeowner is our greeting'); "Himig ng Pasko" (lit. 'Melody of Christmas') by Serapio Y. Ramos; "Noche Buena", composed by Felipe Padilla de León with lyrics by Levi Celerio; and "Kampana ng Simbahan" (lit. 'Church bell') composed by Ryan Cayabyab. "Payapang Daigdig" (lit. 'Peaceful world'), composed in 1946 by de León in the aftermath of World War II, is cited as an enduring example of this genre.

In contrast, modern Filipino pop songs and sentimental ballads have become synonymous with the season, played in malls and on the radio as soon as the "ber months" begin. These include Jose Mari Chan's "Christmas in Our Hearts"; "Pasko Na, Sinta Ko" (lit. 'It's Christmas, my dear'), popularized by Gary Valenciano and composed by Francis Dandan; "Kumukutikutitap" (lit. 'Glimmering') by Cayabyab; "Pasko Na Naman" (lit. 'It's Christmas again') by de León and Celerio; "Sana Ngayong Pasko" (lit. '[I] hope this Christmas'), written by Jimmy Borja and popularized by Ariel Rivera; "Tuloy Na Tuloy Pa Rin ang Pasko" (lit. 'Christmas continues') by the Apo Hiking Society; and "Star ng Pasko", an original Christmas theme song produced by ABS-CBN for its 2009 Christmas station ID and performed by the network's artists. This blend of musical genres contributes to the festive atmosphere throughout the long holiday season.

In addition to local compositions, English-language and Western Christmas songs also feature prominently in the season's soundscape, often played in malls and public spaces alongside OPM carols. Some commentators have noted that this blending of imported and local carols has helped shape a distinct Filipino Christmas identity.

==== Literature ====
Christmas is a recurring theme in Philippine literature, appearing in children's books, short stories, poems, and essays. Many works highlight themes of faith, family, and community, often set against traditions such as Simbang Gabi, Misa de Gallo, and the use of the parol.

Notable works include Rene O. Villanueva's anthology 12 Kwentong Pamasko (lit. '12 Christmas Stories'), a collection of Filipino Christmas tales, and Lin Acacio-Flores and Annette Flores Garcia's A Child's Treasury of Philippine Christmas Stories, which features rural and urban settings and highlights values such as generosity and family unity. Other examples are Rebecca Añonuevo's children's story Ang Mahiyaing Manok (lit. 'The Shy Chicken'), set during a Christmas celebration, Rosario de Guzman-Lingat's Si Lola Isyang at ang Matandang Puno ng Balete (lit. 'Grandma Isyang and the Old Tree of Balete'), which uses Christmas as a backdrop for themes of memory and loss, and journalistic pieces, such as a 2023 The Philippine Star column that highlighted both local and international Christmas books.

==== Films and television ====
While not all films released during the Christmas season are Christmas-themed, the Metro Manila Film Festival (MMFF) is held annually beginning on December 25. Established in 1975, the festival is regarded as one of the most significant events in Philippine cinema, as it showcases exclusively Filipino films and temporarily bans the screening of foreign films in theaters. Because it opens on Christmas Day, the MMFF has become closely tied to the holiday season, with many families watching entries together as part of their celebrations.

Television networks also play a prominent role during the season, producing holiday specials, musical programs, and year-end features. Evening newscasts such as TV Patrol and 24 Oras regularly mark the start of the "ber months" and count down to Christmas Day. Major television networks such as ABS-CBN, GMA, and TV5 release annual Christmas station IDs featuring original songs and performances from their artists, which have become widely anticipated and repeated throughout the season. Television programming during December also includes reruns of popular foreign Christmas films such as Home Alone and The Polar Express, as well as Filipino classics and variety specials, further cementing the medium's central role in the country's holiday celebrations.

=== Other religions and secular observances ===
While Christmas is primarily a Christian holiday in the Philippines, non-Christian communities also engage with the season in different ways. Many participate in its secular aspects, such as parties, decorations, and gift-giving, without observing it as a religious occasion.

Among Muslims, Christmas is not a religious holiday but participation in social gatherings is not uncommon, provided that practices do not contradict Islamic teachings. Some Islamic leaders have emphasized that Muslims may join Christmas parties to show goodwill but should refrain from rituals tied to Christian worship.

The Iglesia ni Cristo (INC) rejects Christmas as a non-biblical and pagan-rooted practice, along with other holidays such as Easter and Halloween. Instead, it holds a Year-end Thanksgiving worship service every December, which functions as a communal and festive event. The INC's stance can extend to public settings; for example, a 2016 Philippine Basketball Association (PBA) game at the Philippine Arena excluded Christmas greetings and music in respect of church beliefs.

== Economy ==
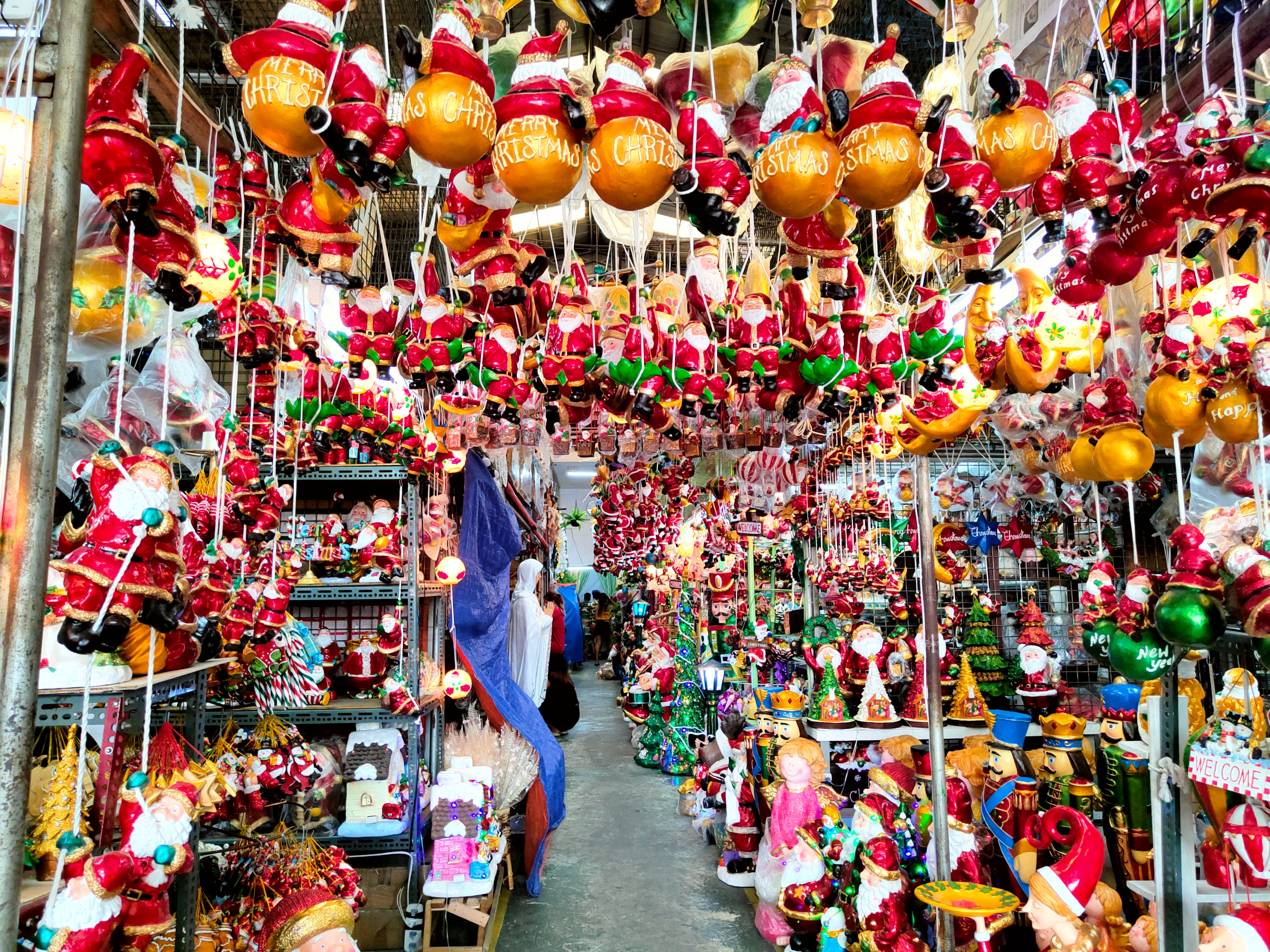
A tiangge on Dapitan Street in Quezon City selling various Santa Claus figurines and other Christmas decorations

The long Philippine Christmas season produces a recurring, nationwide economic cycle. It concentrates cash inflows such as remittances and year-end bonuses, stimulates retail and service activity, increases temporary employment, and creates critical income opportunities for both formal and informal workers. At the same time, it can stress logistics and public services and contribute to household indebtedness.

=== Consumer spending, remittances, and bonuses ===
The Christmas season is regarded as the single biggest driver of household spending. Surveys show that Filipino families spend more than triple their monthly income on gifts, food, and celebrations during the holidays, with a 2021 estimate placing expected outlays at ₱37,000 per household.

Remittances from Overseas Filipino Workers (OFWs) and other personal transfers rise sharply in the months leading to December, regularly hitting record highs and providing a crucial cash boost for household consumption. The distribution of year-end incentives, particularly mandatory 13th month pay and company-specific Christmas bonuses, further amplifies consumption. The Department of Labor and Employment (DOLE) requires that 13th month pay be released on or before December 24.

=== Commerce, employment, and tourism ===
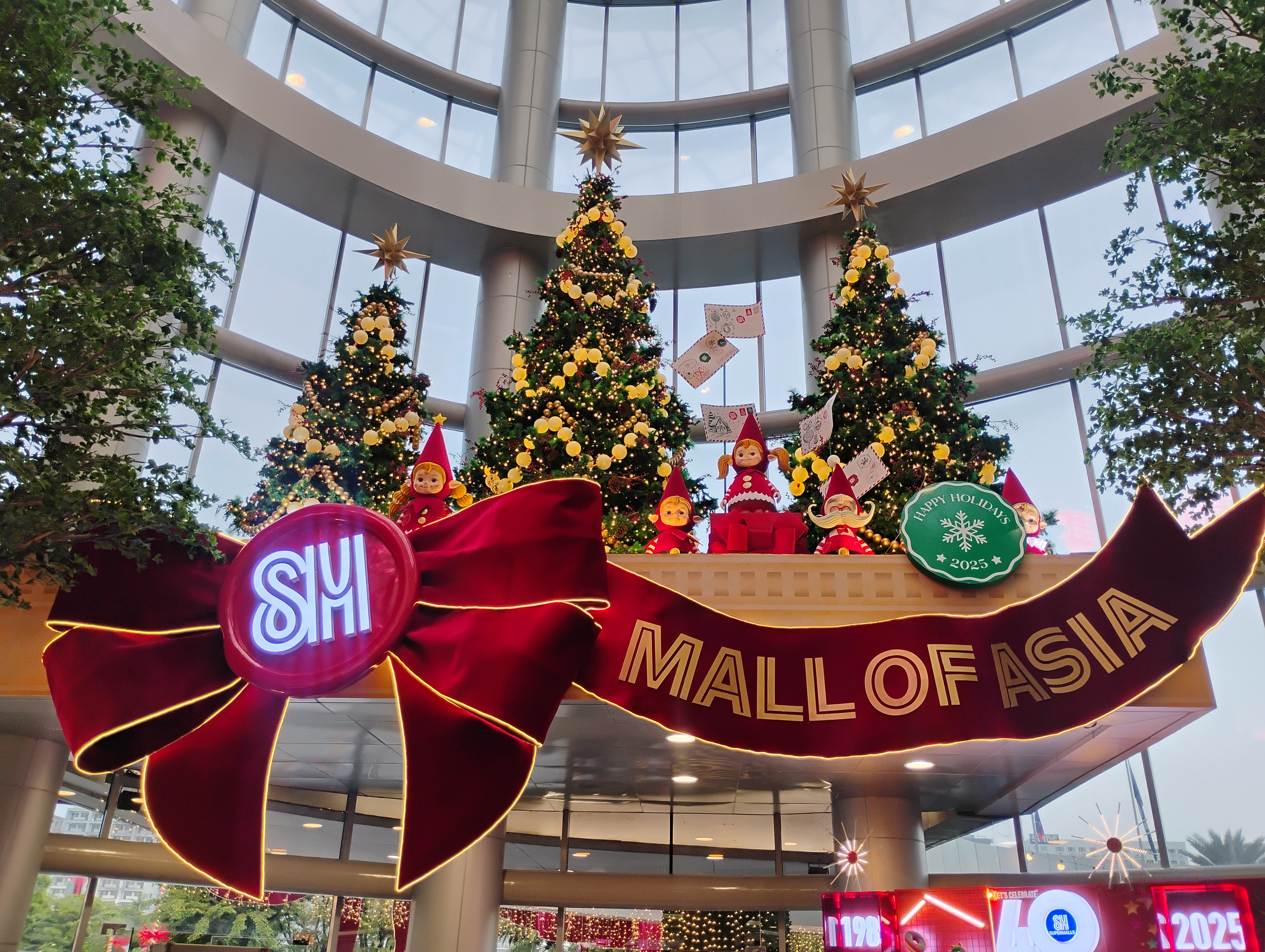
Christmas decorations at SM Mall of Asia in Pasay in September 2025

Malls, department stores, and online platforms report sustained sales growth starting as early as September, with themed promotions running throughout the "ber months". E-commerce growth drives record parcel volumes, requiring courier firms to expand hiring, while electricity use and transportation demand rise due to mall operations, lighting displays, and year-end travel. Holiday demand generates temporary jobs in retail, logistics, food service, crafts, and tourism, leading to a seasonal dip in unemployment rates. Small-scale producers such as parol makers in Pampanga also benefit from seasonal orders.

Christmas celebrations also stimulate domestic tourism, as local government units host light displays, festivals, and themed attractions that generate seasonal employment and revenue. This period marks a peak in domestic travel, with Filipinos returning home or vacationing for leisure, driving up hotel, restaurant, and transportation earnings. Demand for traditional nochebuena staples such as lechon, ham, and kakanin also rises sharply. Paskuhan Village, located in San Fernando, Pampanga, was inaugurated in December 1990 as a Christmas-themed park showcasing local lantern-making and promoting regional tourism. Although its operations have declined, local and national agencies have proposed redeveloping the site to revive its cultural and economic role.

=== Inflation, infrastructure, and post-holiday effects ===
The Philippine Statistics Authority (PSA) regularly reports seasonal peaks in food inflation during December, particularly for meat, rice, and other staples. The Christmas rush also worsens urban traffic congestion in Metro Manila, prompting the Metropolitan Manila Development Authority (MMDA) to implement traffic management schemes and coordinate mall hour adjustments. Public transportation agencies extend service hours to meet passenger demand.

Economists note a "January hangover" in which households cut back on spending or face debt repayments after December consumption, prompting banks and government agencies to issue budgeting reminders.

== See also ==
- Festivals in the Philippines
- Holy Week in the Philippines
- Public holidays in the Philippines
