= Llanera =

Llanera is the feminine form of the Spanish word llanero. It may refer to:

- Llanera, Nueva Ecija, a municipality in the province of Nueva Ecija, Philippines
- Llanera, Asturias, a municipality in the autonomous community of Asturias, Spain
- Llanera music, music of the Llanero culture in Colombia and Venezuela
- Mariano Llanera (1855–1942), Filipino General
- Llanera, also spelled lyanera, an oval-shaped tin mold used to make leche flan and hardinera in Philippine cuisine
