= Meatloaf =

Dish of baked or smoked shaped ground meat

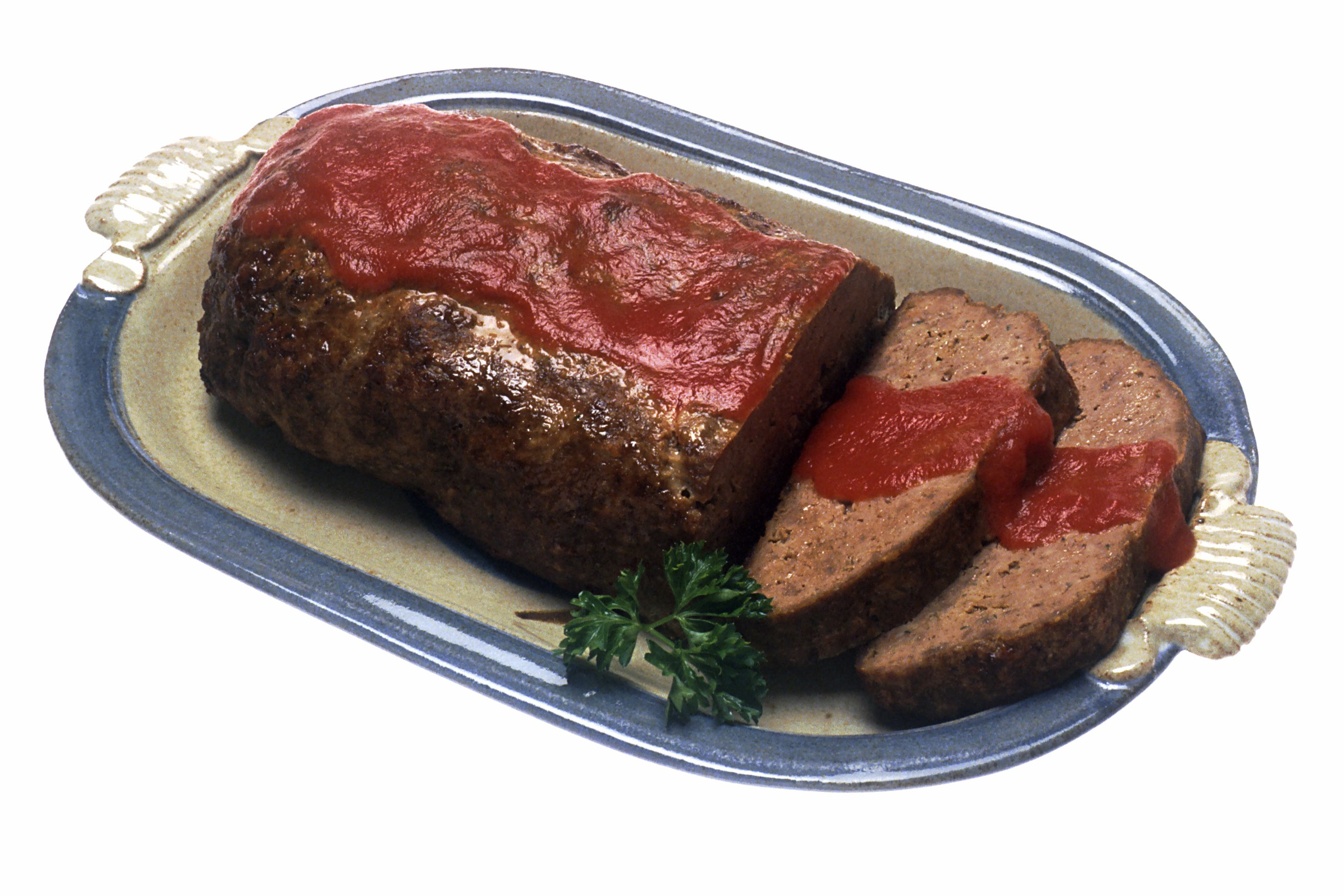
American meatloaf with tomato ketchup

Meatloaf is a dish of ground meat combined with other ingredients, formed into the shape of a loaf, then baked or smoked. It may be hand-formed on a baking tray or pan-formed in a loaf pan. It is usually made with ground beef, although ground lamb, pork, veal, venison, poultry, and seafood are also used, sometimes in combination. Vegetarian adaptations of meatloaf may use imitation meat or pulses.

The cooked meatloaf can be sliced like a loaf of bread to make individual portions. It can easily become dry; therefore, various techniques exist to keep the dish moist, like mixing in bread crumbs and eggs, covering it with sauce, wrapping it, or using moisture-enhancing ingredients in the mixture, such as filling it with fatty meats, cheeses, or vegetables.

== History ==
Meatloaf is a traditional Austrian, Slovak, German, Czech, Nordic, and Flemish dish, and it is a cousin to the meatball in Dutch cuisine.

North American meatloaf has its origins in scrapple, a mixture of ground pork and cornmeal served by German-Americans in Pennsylvania since colonial times. Meatloaf in the contemporary American sense did not appear in cookbooks until the late 19th century.

== National variations ==
=== Europe ===
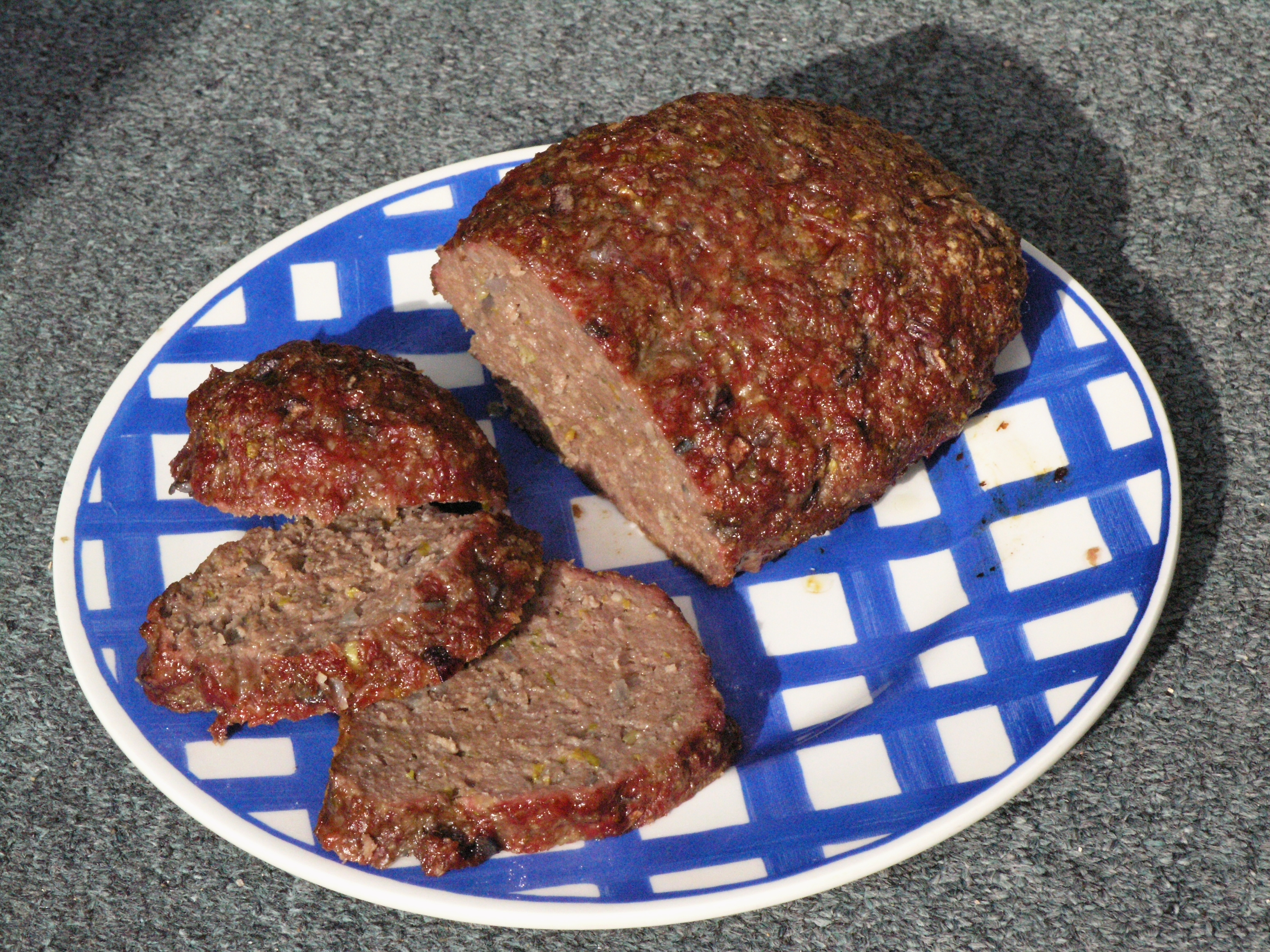
Czech sekaná

The Austrian version is faschierter Braten 'minced roast' or falscher Hase 'fake rabbit'. Most of the time, it is not filled. The variation im Speckmantel wraps the loaf with ham or bacon before baking. It is often served with mashed potatoes (when warm), or with Cumberland sauce (when cold).Filled with 3 hard-boiled eggs it is called "Stephaniebraten" in Austria.

The Belgian version is vleesbrood 'meat loaf' or fricandon in Dutch; in French, it is pain de viande 'meat loaf'. It is usually served warm with various sauces, but can also be eaten cold with bread.

Rulo Stefani (Bulgarian: Руло Стефани), a Bulgarian meatloaf, is similar to the Hungarian Stefánia meatloaf, with hard-boiled eggs, and sometimes with chopped carrots and pickled gherkins in the middle.

In Slovakia and Czechia, meatloaf is called sekaná, 'chopped'. It is optional to put hard-boiled eggs, gherkins, or wienerwurst inside.

Danish meatloaf is called forloren hare 'mock hare' or farsbrød 'ground-meat bread', and is usually made from a mixture of ground pork and beef with strips of bacon or cubed bacon on top. It is served with boiled or mashed potatoes and brown gravy sweetened with redcurrant jam.

Finnish meatloaf is called lihamureke, and is only seasoned with salt and pepper. It is not customary to stuff it. It is usually eaten with mashed potatoes and brown sauce.

In Germany, meatloaf is called Hackbraten 'ground roast', faschierter Braten 'minced roast', Wiegebraten, falscher Hase 'false hare', and Heuchelhase 'mock hare'. In some regions, it often has boiled eggs inside. Fleischlaib literally means "meat-loaf", but is actually Leberkäse 'liver-cheese', which is not meatloaf and does not contain either liver or cheese.

In Greece, meatloaf is called rolo (ρολό) and is usually filled with hard-boiled eggs, although several other variations exist.

Stefania meatloaf (Hungarian: Stefánia szelet) or Stefania slices are a type of Hungarian long meatloaf baked in a loaf pan, with three hard-boiled eggs in the middle.

In Italy, meatloaf is called polpettone and can be filled with eggs, ham and cheese, and other ingredients.

The Macedonian rolat is similar to the Middle Eastern kofta. Ground beef is rolled and cooked until brown. It can be cooked with vegetables and various sauces.

The Dutch version of meatloaf is gehaktbrood 'minced loaf' and can be eaten warm or cold. Slavink is sometimes thought of as a small meatloaf, though it is pan-fried.

In Polish cuisine, pieczeń rzymska 'Roman roast' or klops is made of ground pork, beef, onions and garlic, with an obligatory hard boiled egg inside.

In Romanian cuisine, drob is similar to other minced meat dishes in the region like the Bulgarian rulo Stefani or the Hungarian Stefánia meatloaf. The major difference is that drob is always made with lamb organs (or a mixture of lamb organs and pork or veal), and the hard boiled eggs in the centre are optional.

Swedish meatloaf is called köttfärslimpa 'minced meat-loaf' and is usually made from a mixture of ground pork and beef. It is served with boiled or mashed potatoes, brown sauce gravy, often made from the meat juices released from cooking the meatloaf, and lingonberry jam. It is also used thinly sliced as a spread on sandwiches.

In the UK, haslet or acelet is a pork meatloaf dish with herbs originally from Lincolnshire, which can be eaten cold or hot. The word is derived from the Old French hastilles, 'entrails'. In Lincolnshire, haslet is typically made from stale white bread, minced pork, sage, salt and black pepper. It is typically served cold with pickles and salad, or as a sandwich filling. In England, it is occasionally sold at a delicatessen counter. Gala pie is another variety of meatloaf widely available at deli counters in the UK.

=== Asia ===
==== Philippines ====
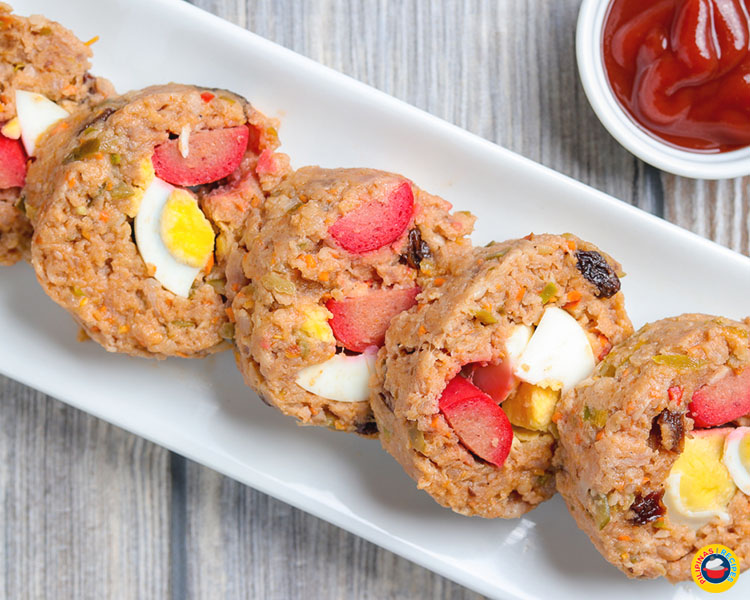
Filipino pork embutido

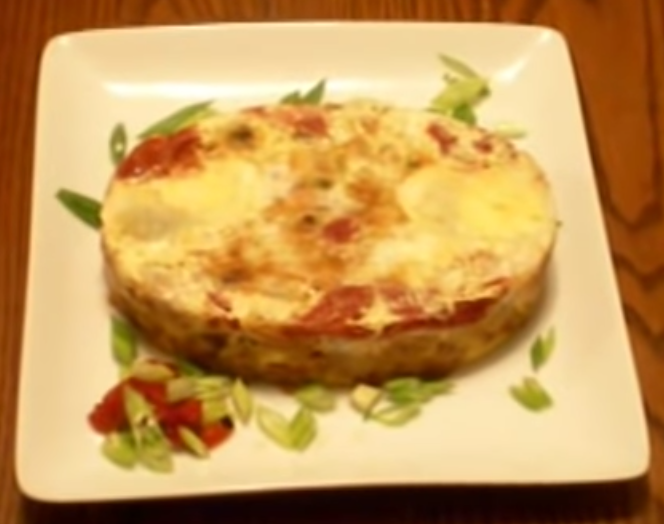
The Filipino hardinera meatloaf is distinctively oval due to the use of traditional tin molds called llanera.

Filipino Embutido (not to be confused with the Spanish embutido) is made of seasoned ground pork, raisins, minced carrots, sausages, and whole boiled eggs. The meat is molded into a roll with the sausages and hard boiled eggs set in the middle. Another variation involves wrapping the meatloaf with pork mesentery. It is then wrapped in aluminum foil (historically, banana leaves) and steamed for an hour. The cooked embutido may be stored in freezers. It is usually served fried and sliced for breakfast.

Embutido is sometimes confused with morcón (not to be confused with Spanish morcón), due to their similarity in appearance. However, morcón is a beef roulade, not a meatloaf.

Hardinera is a Filipino meatloaf made with diced or ground pork topped with sliced hard-boiled eggs, pineapples, carrots, bell peppers, peas, tomatoes, and raisins, among others.

==== Turkey ====
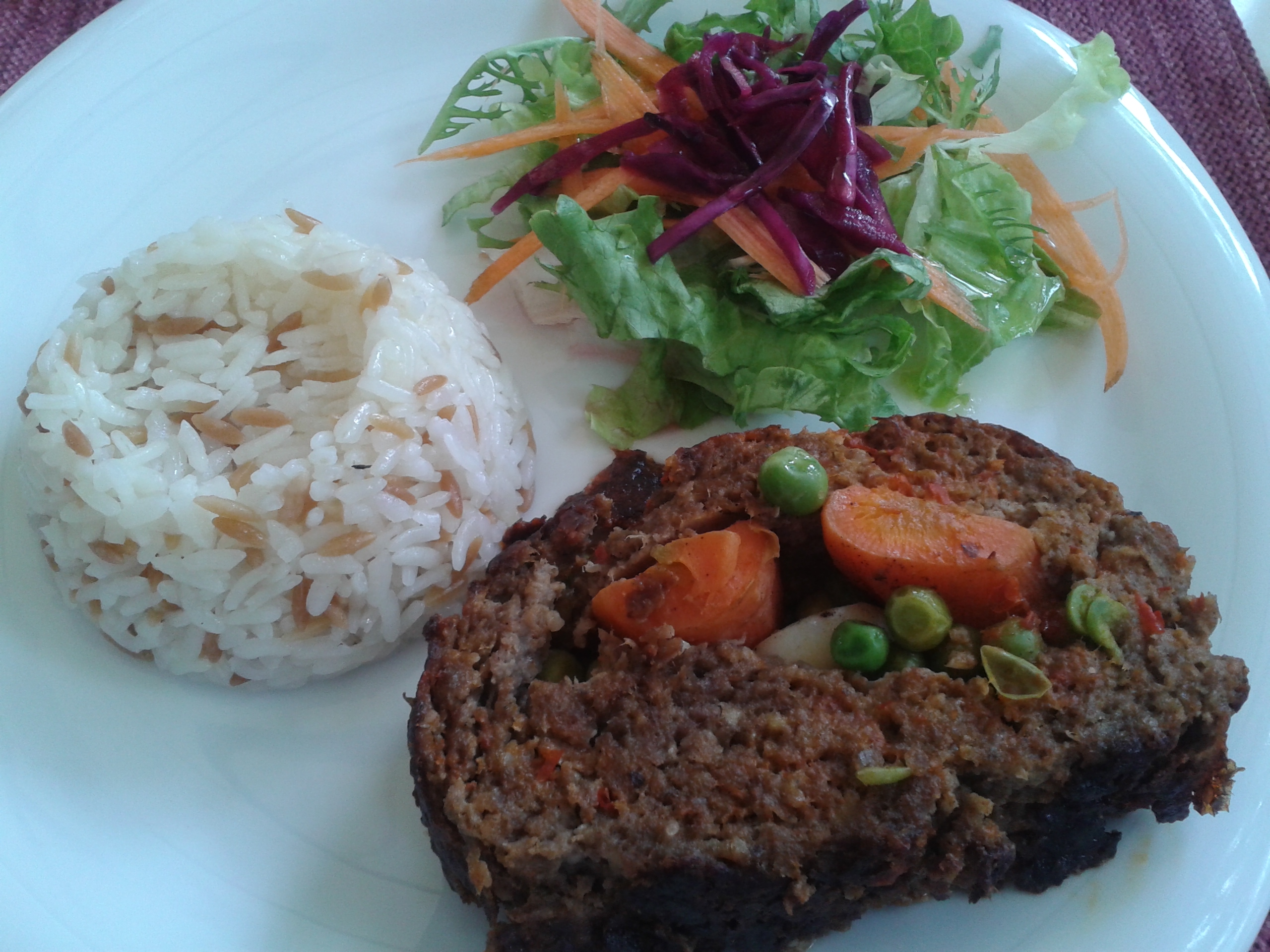
Dalyan köfte with rice pilaf and salad

In Turkish cuisine, dalyan köfte or rulo köfte is typically filled with carrots, peas, and whole boiled eggs.

==== Vietnam ====
The Vietnamese meatloaf version is called chả. It is boiled rather than baked or smoked. There are many versions of chả that differ in the ingredients used.

=== South America ===
Chilean meatloaf, known as asado alemán ('German roasted meat') is a staple of southern Chilean cuisine, especially in areas known for having been influenced by the arrival of German immigrants during the 18th and 19th century. The most common recipe nowadays consists of ground beef, carrots, sausages, boiled eggs and breadcrumbs, cooked in the oven and normally served with a side-dish of mashed potatoes or rice.

=== Jewish cuisine ===
In Ashkenazi Jewish cuisine, meatloaf is called Klops (Hebrew: קלופס) and can be served cold or hot. It is sometimes filled with whole boiled eggs.

=== Middle East ===
In Lebanon, kibbeh (ground beef or lamb mixed with bulgur wheat) can sometimes be formed into a loaf and baked. It is sometimes made from raw meat.

=== North America ===
The first recorded recipe for the modern North American meatloaf dates from the late 1870s. Those preparing the dish were told to chop up whatever meat was on hand, the meat most likely being beef. To that they added salt, pepper, onion, egg and milk-soaked bread. This meatloaf was originally served as a breakfast food.

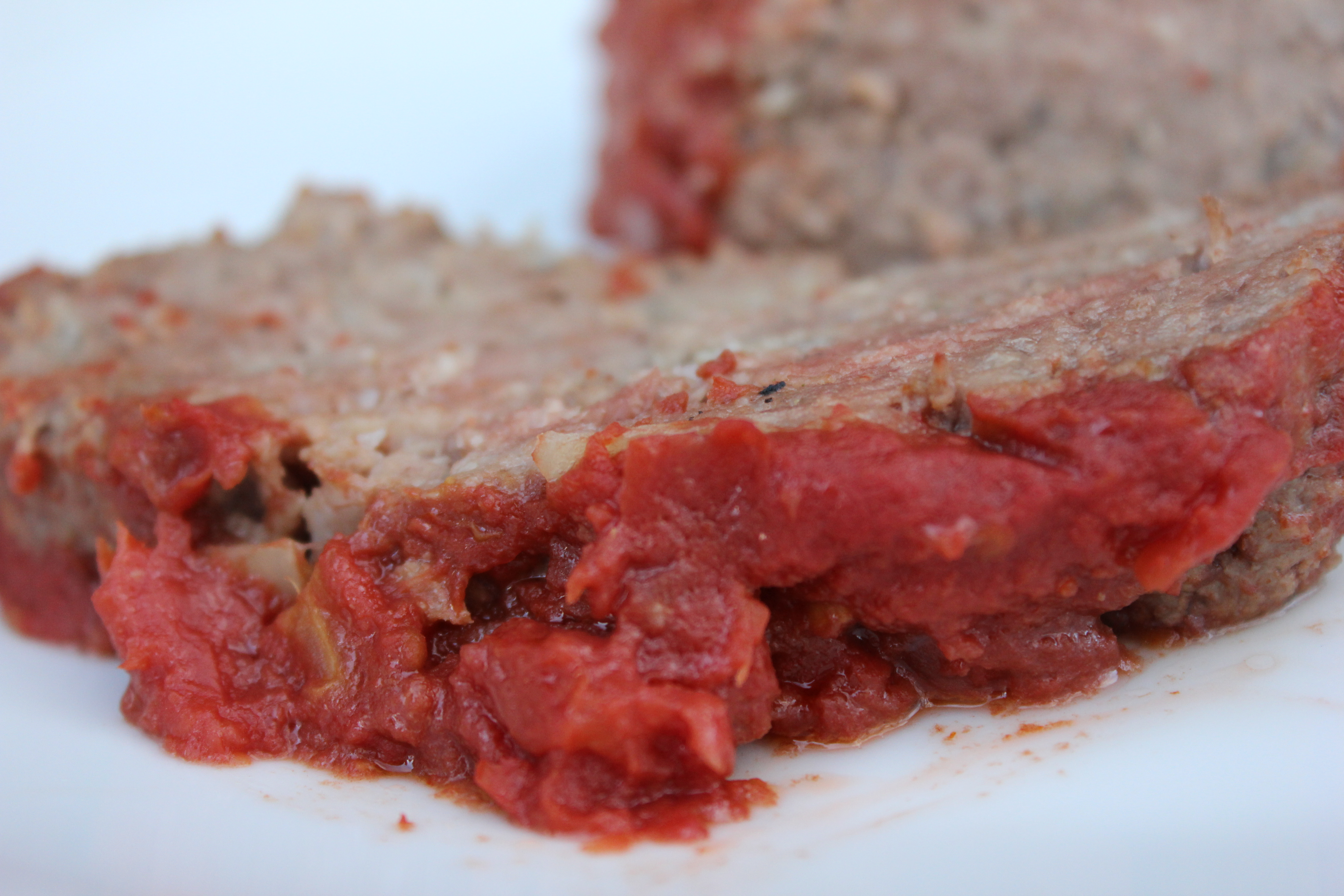
Sliced meatloaf topped with tomato sauce

In the US during the Great Depression, cooking meatloaf was a way for families to stretch their food budget by using an inexpensive type of meat and left-over ingredients. Along with spices, it was popular to add cereal grains, bread or saltine crackers to the meatloaf to add bulk and stretch the meat. This tradition of additions still lives on, but with new goals: primarily, producing a lower-fat dish with superior binding and consistency.

Meatloaf recipes in North America are typically made with a sauce or relish, often applied before cooking. Many recipes call for a tomato sauce to be poured over the loaf, which forms a crust during baking. A simple brown or onion gravy or a can of cream of mushroom soup can substitute for tomato-based sauce. Barbecue sauce, tomato ketchup, or a mixture of ketchup and prepared mustard may also be used. This style of meatloaf may also be topped with a "meatloaf sauce" consisting of ketchup and brown sugar. Another variety of meatloaf, in the same style, is prepared by "frosting" the loaf with mashed potatoes, drizzling a small amount of butter over the top, and then browning it in the oven.

Some recipes are even more imaginative. There are vegetarian meatloaves, vegan meatloaves, and even meatloaves made with ahi tuna, French fries, Fritos, Spanish chorizo, mint and pine nuts. Sculpted versions such as feetloaf are also becoming popular, especially on social media.

A pair of smoked meatloafs

Meatloaf in North America is normally served warm, as part of a main course, but it can also be sliced as a cold cut (and then used in sandwiches). This dish can be considered a typical comfort food in Canada and the US, and so it is served in many diners and restaurants. Indeed, meatloaf is said to have attained iconic comfort food status along with hamburgers, fried chicken and mac and cheese. In a 2007 poll by Good Housekeeping, meatloaf was the seventh-favorite dish of Americans.

In Puerto Rican cuisine, meatloaf is known as albondigón or butifarrón al horno. Puerto Rican style meatloaf is made with ground pork, beef, turkey, adobo, Worcestershire sauce, milk, ketchup, potatoes, red beans, breadcrumbs, parsley, and a hard-boiled egg in the middle. Mexican meatloaf is known as albondigón and is small in size.

The Cuban version of meatloaf is called pulpeta. It is made with ground beef and ground ham, and stuffed with hard boiled eggs, and it is cooked on the stovetop. The dish was brought to public attention, albeit mistakenly referred to as a sausage, in the second episode of the third season of The Cosby Show, entitled "Food for Thought". However, due to Cuba's strict laws regarding the purchasing of meat products, especially beef, meatloaf is not a common dish in Cuba.

== See also ==
- Forcemeat – Uniform mixture of lean meat with fat made by grinding the ingredients
- List of beef dishes
- Meatball – Dish of ground meat rolled into a ball
- Meat pie – Pie with meat filling
- Pâté – Forcemeat baked in a mold
- Red pudding – Scottish meat dish
