= Everlasting (food) =

Filipino steamed meatloaf

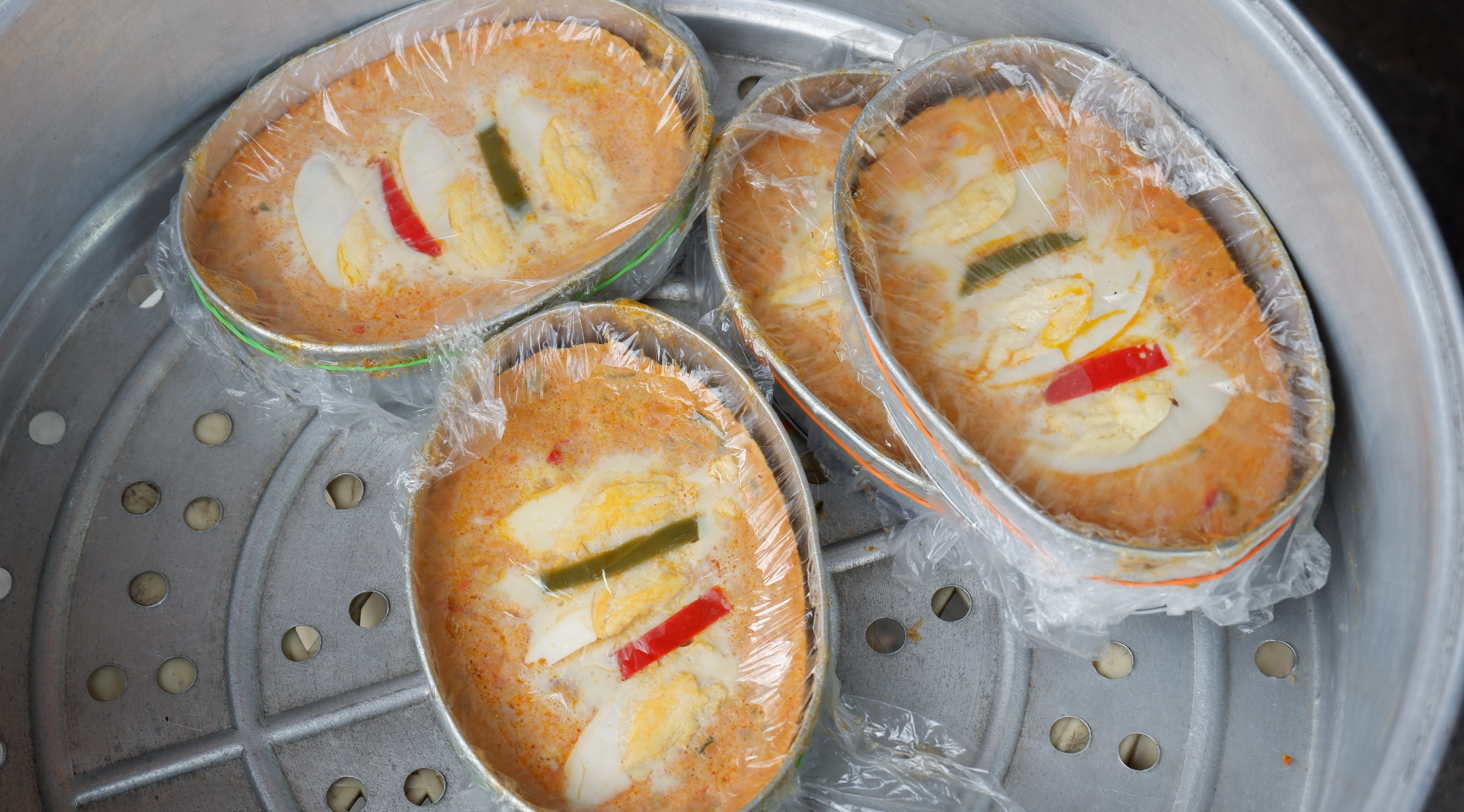
- Everlasting meatloaves in traditional llanera molds
- Course: Main dish
- Place of origin: Philippines
- Region or state: Marikina
- Serving temperature: Hot, cold
- Similar dishes: embutido. morcón, hardinera

Everlasting, also known as the Marikina meatloaf, is a Filipino steamed meatloaf originating from Marikina. It is made with ground pork, Chorizo de Bilbao sausages, carrots, bell peppers, raisins, pickle relish, tomatoes, onions, and eggs. It is similar to the hardinera meatloaf of Quezon and is also traditionally steamed in an oval-shaped tin mold known as a llanera (or lyanera).

== See also ==
- Morcón
- Embutido
- List of pork dishes
