= Morcón (Filipino cuisine) =

Filipino braised beef roulade

Morcon
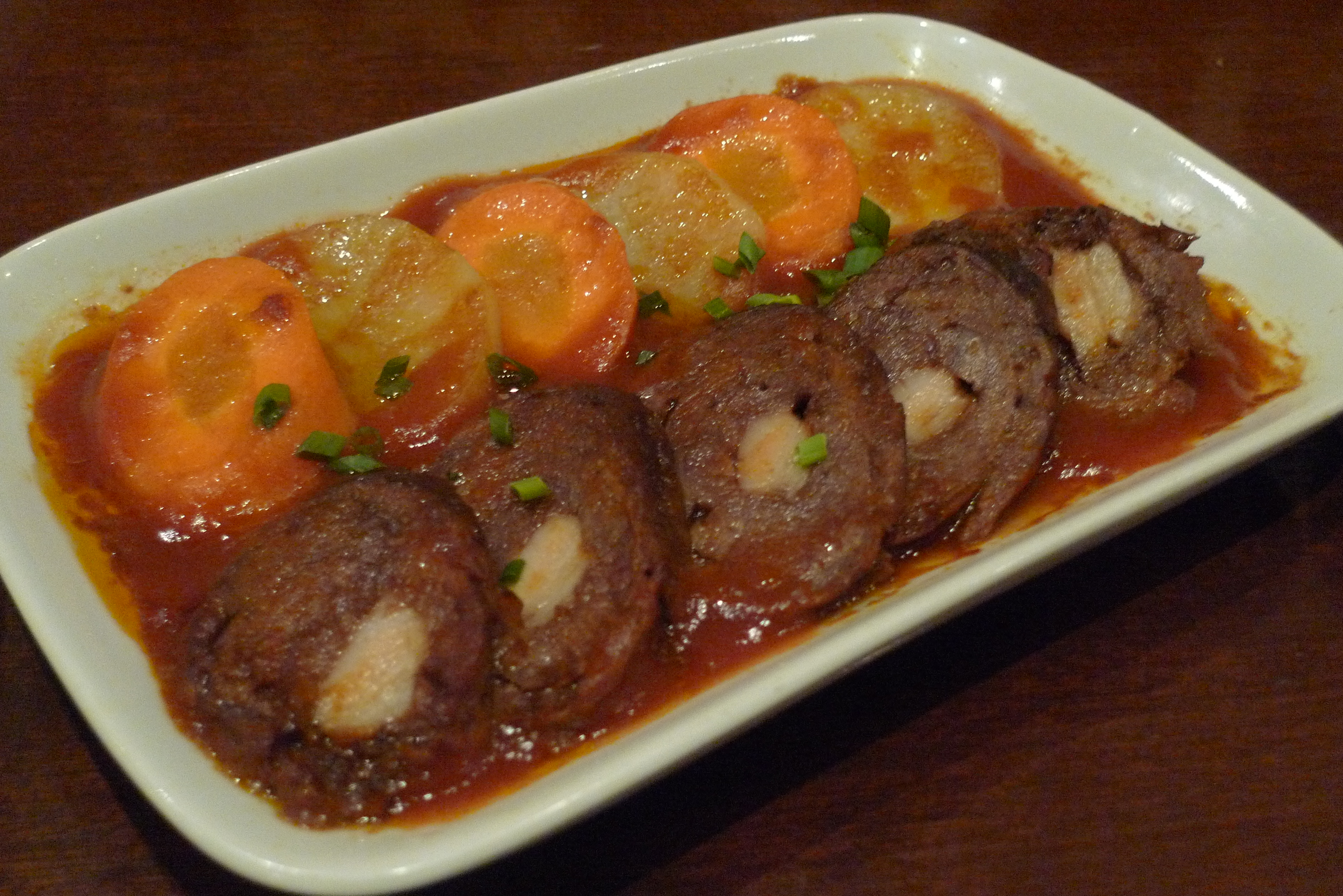
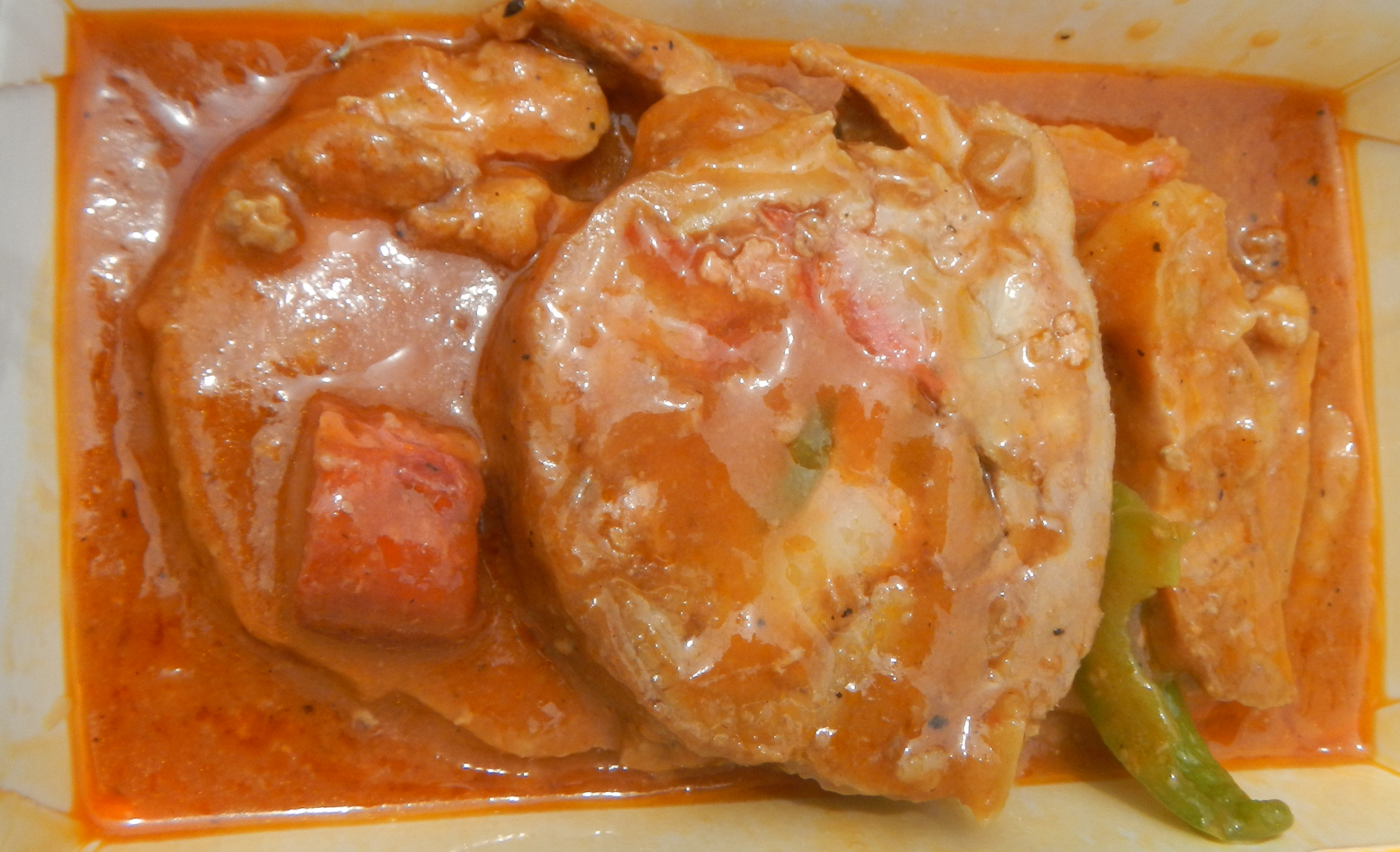
- Alternative names: Morconito
- Course: Main dish
- Place of origin: Philippines
- Serving temperature: hot
- Main ingredients: flank steak, carrots, raisins, pickled cucumber, sausage, hard-boiled eggs, flour, tomato sauce
- Similar dishes: Embutido, Hardinera

Morcon or morconito is a Philippine braised beef roulade made with beef flank steak stuffed with hard-boiled eggs, carrots, pickled cucumber, cheese, and various sausages. It is commonly served during Christmas and other festive occasions.

== Origins ==
The name is derived from the Spanish morcón, a type of dry sausage originally used to stuff the dish. These sausages are now known under the general terms longganisa or chorizo in the Philippines, with the term morcon becoming exclusively used for this dish.

== Description ==
Morcon is made from skirt or round-cut beef flank steak, marinated in a soy sauce mixture with spices to taste (usually black pepper and calamansi juice). It is then stuffed with minced carrots, various longganisa sausages (or even bacon or hotdogs), cheese (usually queso de bola), pickled cucumber, and various other ingredients. The beef is carefully rolled into a cylinder, tied horizontally and vertically with twine, and sprinkled with flour. The beef is then fried until brown.

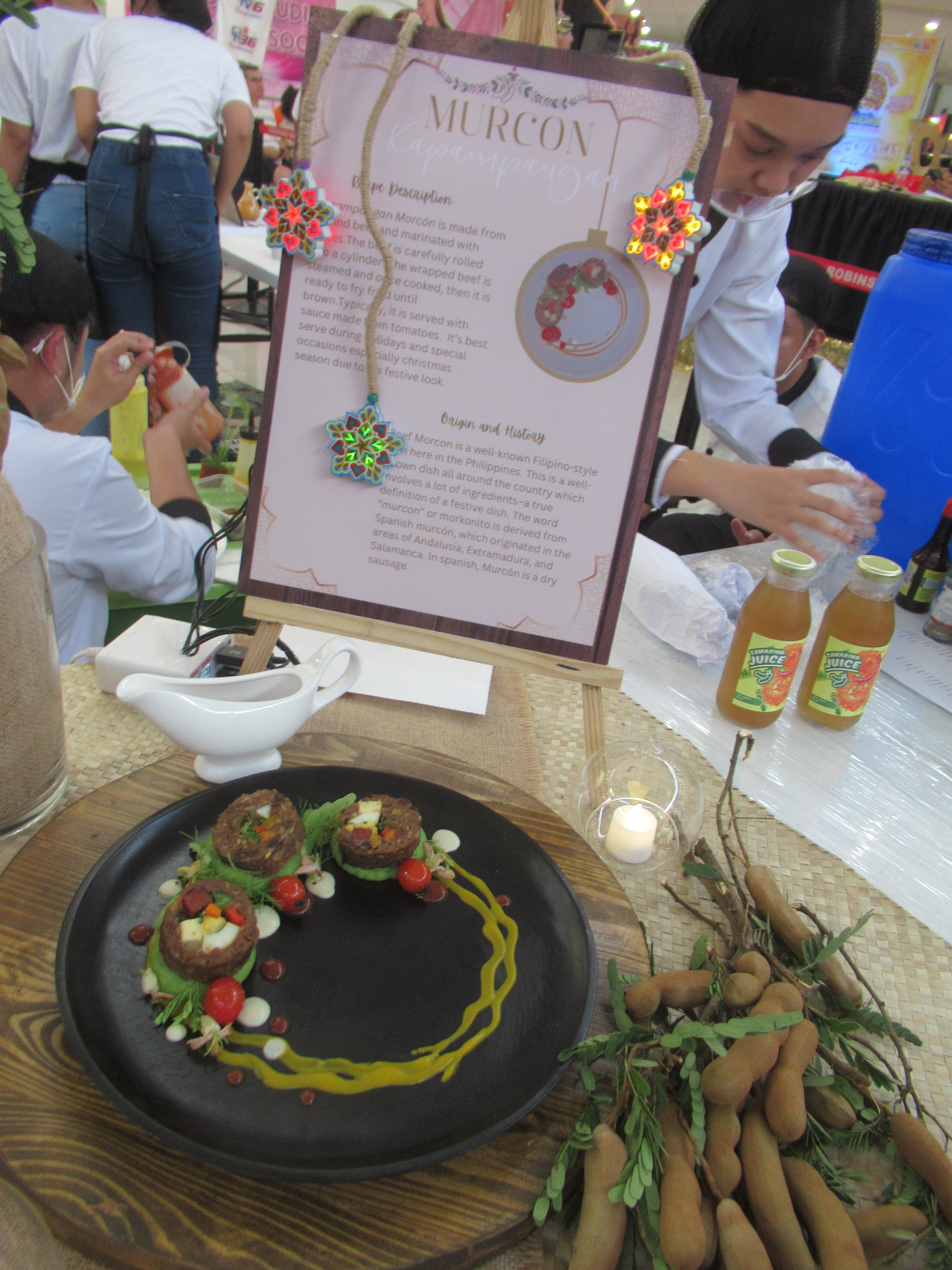
Kapampangan cuisine Murcon

The sauce is cooked separately, and typically use garlic, onions, cheese, chili peppers, and bay leaves simmered in tomato sauce and water. The fried beef is added and braised over low heat until tender. Once cooked, the twine is removed and the beef is sliced into little discs. It is served with the sauce and is eaten with white rice.

== Similar dishes ==
Morcon is visually similar to and uses similar ingredients as the more common Philippine embutido. They are commonly confused with each other, but embutido is a steamed meatloaf that uses ground pork.

== See also ==
- Chicken galantina
- Hardinera
- Everlasting
- Hamonado
- List of beef dishes
- Tapa
- Tocino
