= Feetloaf =

Dish intended to be served on Halloween

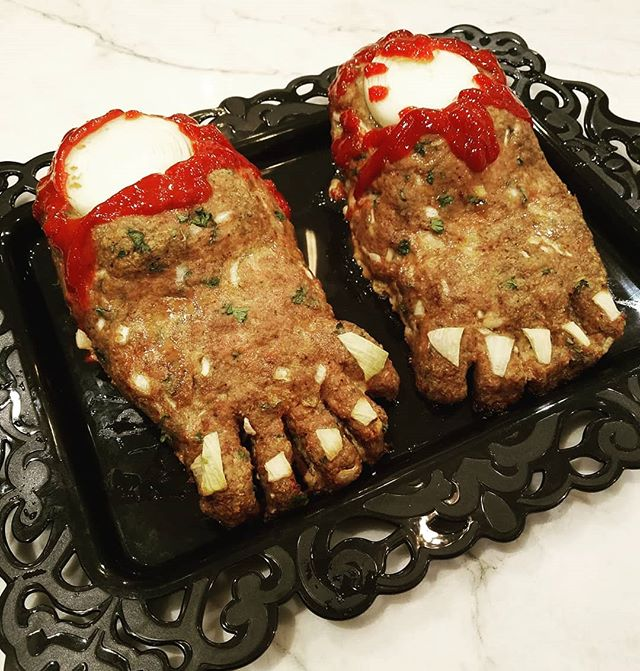
- Type: Seasonal (Halloween)
- Invented: 2009
- Serving temperature: 98.6 °F (37.0 °C)
- Main ingredients: Ground beef
- Ingredients generally used: onion slivers, parsnips

Feetloaf is a novelty dish intended to be served on Halloween. The earliest known reference is a 2009 cooking blog which was based on a recipe found in a seasonal cookbook sold at a grocery store checkout counter. The original recipe described a meatloaf molded into the shape of a human foot, using brazil nuts as toenails and ketchup or barbecue sauce to mimic blood.

The dish was originally called "Bloody Stump" or "Feet of Meat". The first known use of the term "Feetloaf" was in a 2014 Today Show interview with Laurin Sydney, Kathie Lee Gifford and Hoda Kotb. A contemporaneous MTV News story alternately referred to the dish as "Feet Loaf" (two words) and "Meat Foot". A 2016 New York Times Magazine article mentioned feetloaf as being the subject of an Amy Sedaris Instagram post.

In 2019, The Washington Post featured the dish in a pre-Halloween article, citing a tweet by rapper Richard Wilson (known by his stage name Lil Rich Aka Crash). According to The Post, the tweet had nearly 28,000 incoming links and had amassed almost 9,000 retweets. The version of the recipe described by The Post used slivers of onion instead of brazil nuts for toenails, and parsnips to simulate a sawed-off tibia. Serving suggestions included using a small handsaw instead of a knife, and a quarter-size sheet pan as a platter, mimicking a laboratory tray. In the same year, Chris Prosperi of NBC Connecticut noted that there were "tons of pictures" of feetloaf available on the internet.

In 2021, The Daily Mirror reported on a variation of the recipe which included a cheese topping. The dish was described as "absolutely disgusting".

== In fiction ==
Feetloaf is mentioned in the 1967 children's book The Hungry Thing. When the title character, a creature with a "Feed Me" sign hung around its neck, requests feetloaf, other characters ponder what it might be. A wiseman suggests it might be "a kind of shoe pudding that grows in a tree", and the cook counters that it "tastes sweet, and it's eaten by kings when they dine in bare feet". The book uses incremental rhyming changes to lead the reader from made-up nonsense spoken by the monster to an actual culinary dish; "feetloaf" becomes "beetloaf" and then "meatloaf".
