= Embutido (Filipino cuisine) =

Filipino meatloaf

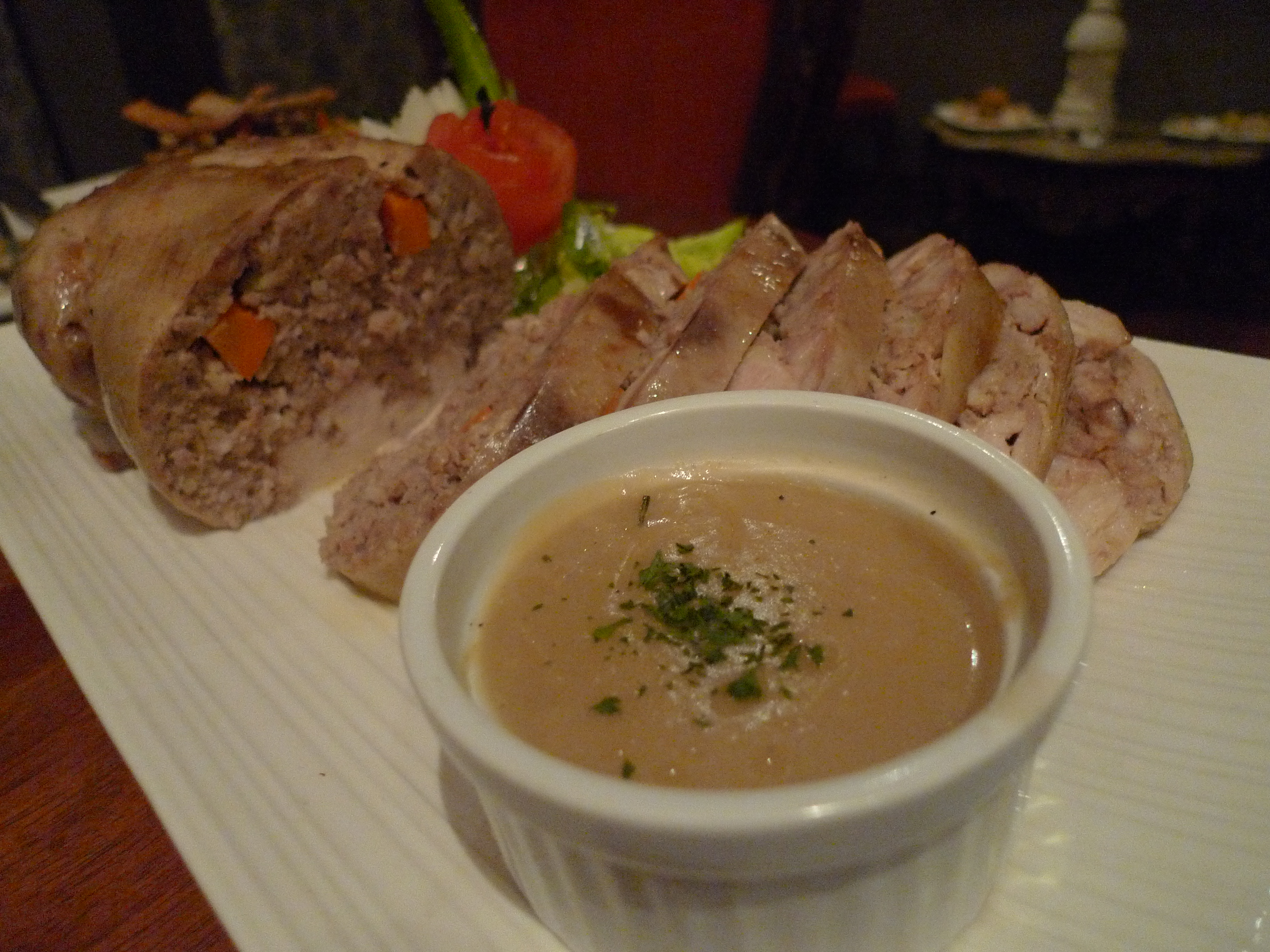
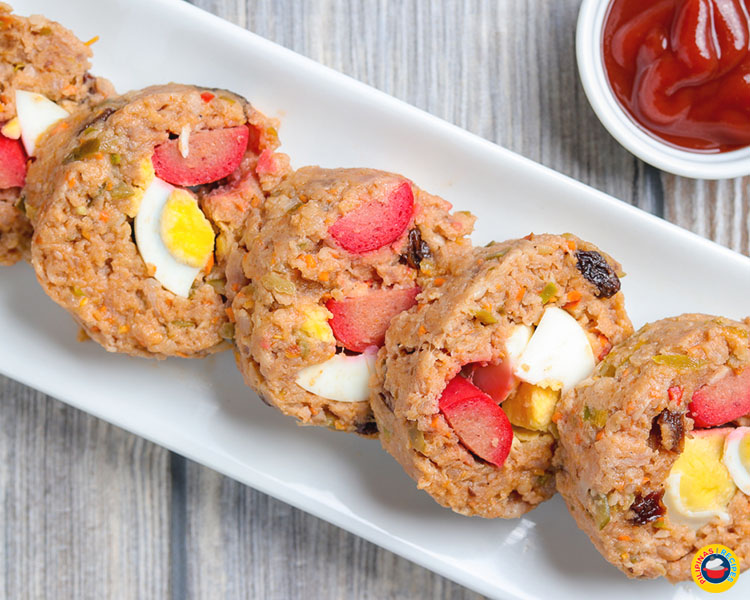
- Alternative names: embotido, Filipino meatloaf, Filipino pork rolls
- Course: Main dish
- Place of origin: Philippines
- Serving temperature: hot, cold
- Main ingredients: ground pork, eggs, raisins, carrots, bread crumbs, ham/Vienna sausages/longganisa
- Similar dishes: Morcón, Hardinera

Embutido, or embotido, is a Filipino meatloaf made with ground pork and stuffed with hard-boiled eggs and sliced ham or various sausages. It is traditionally wrapped in aluminum foil and steamed, though it can also be baked.

Embutido can be served hot or chilled, and it is often paired with banana ketchup or another type of sweet sauce.

Despite the Spanish name, the dish traces its roots to the American meatloaf. The name is commonly translated as Filipino meatloaf.

== Origins ==
The name of the dish in the Philippines originally referred to embutido, the Spanish word for sausage. Dried sausages are now known under the general terms longganisa or chorizo in the Philippines, with the term embutido used for the meatloaf dish.

The dish originates from the American meatloaf introduced during the American colonial period in the Philippines from 1898 to 1946. This developed with the growth of the American canning industry and the arrival of processed meat and other canned goods in the islands. Canned products were new at the time, and Filipino families adapted them into many recipes.

== Description ==
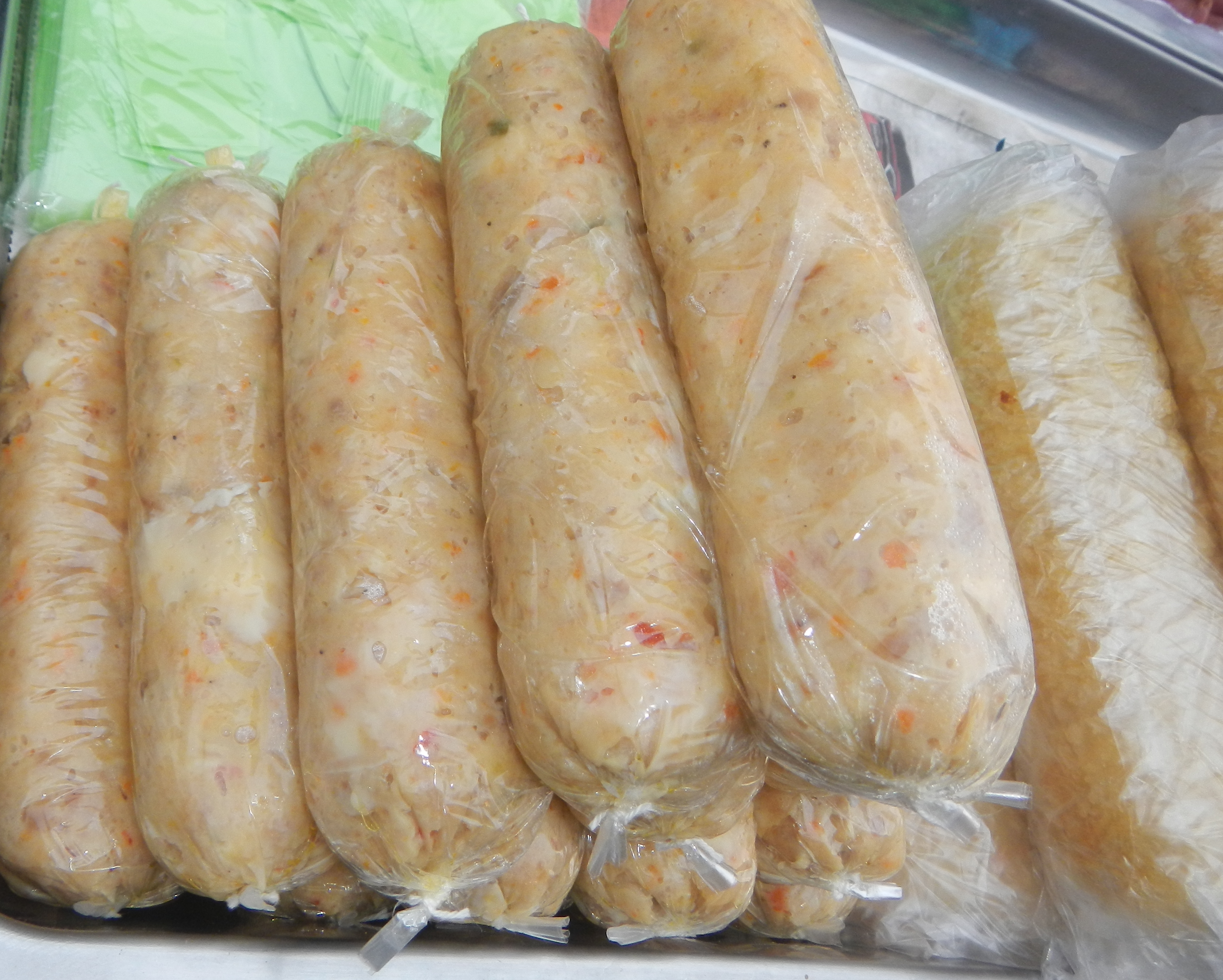
Embutido rolls for sale in Malolos, Bulacan

Embutido is made by mixing ground pork with bread crumbs or shredded white bread, raisins, minced carrots, sautéed onions and garlic, seasoned with salt and black pepper to taste. Various other ingredients may be added to the mixture, including sweet pickle relish, cheese, pineapple chunks, and sliced pimiento or bell peppers. The mixture is then placed on aluminum foil. Hard-boiled eggs are placed lengthwise on it, along with sliced ham, Vienna sausages, longganisa sausages, or even hotdogs. The arrangement is covered with more ground pork mixture, wrapped completely with the aluminum foil, rolled into a cylinder and steamed.

Embutido is usually sliced; it can be sliced while hot, but it is more usual to chill it so that it is less likely to disintegrate when slicing. It can be frozen for storage. Cold embutido can be fried before serving. It is traditionally eaten with white rice and dipped into banana ketchup, sweet chili sauce, or some other sweet sauce.

Embutido differs from the American meatloaf in that it is usually steamed, although it can be baked; and it is made with ground pork rather than ground beef, though modern variants can use beef or beef and pork mixtures.

== Similar dishes ==
Embutido looks similar to another Filipino dish called morcón, which also uses comparable ingredients. However they are very different dishes. The Filipino morcón is different from the original Spanish morcón, which is a type of sausage. The Filipino version is a beef roulade stuffed with eggs, ham, sausages, and pickled cucumber. It is cooked by frying and stewing, not by steaming or baking.

== See also ==
- Chicken galantina
- Hardinera
- Everlasting
- Filipino spaghetti
- Scotch egg
- Spam
- Tapa
- Tocino
- List of pork dishes
