= Chicken galantina =

Filipino stuffed chicken dish

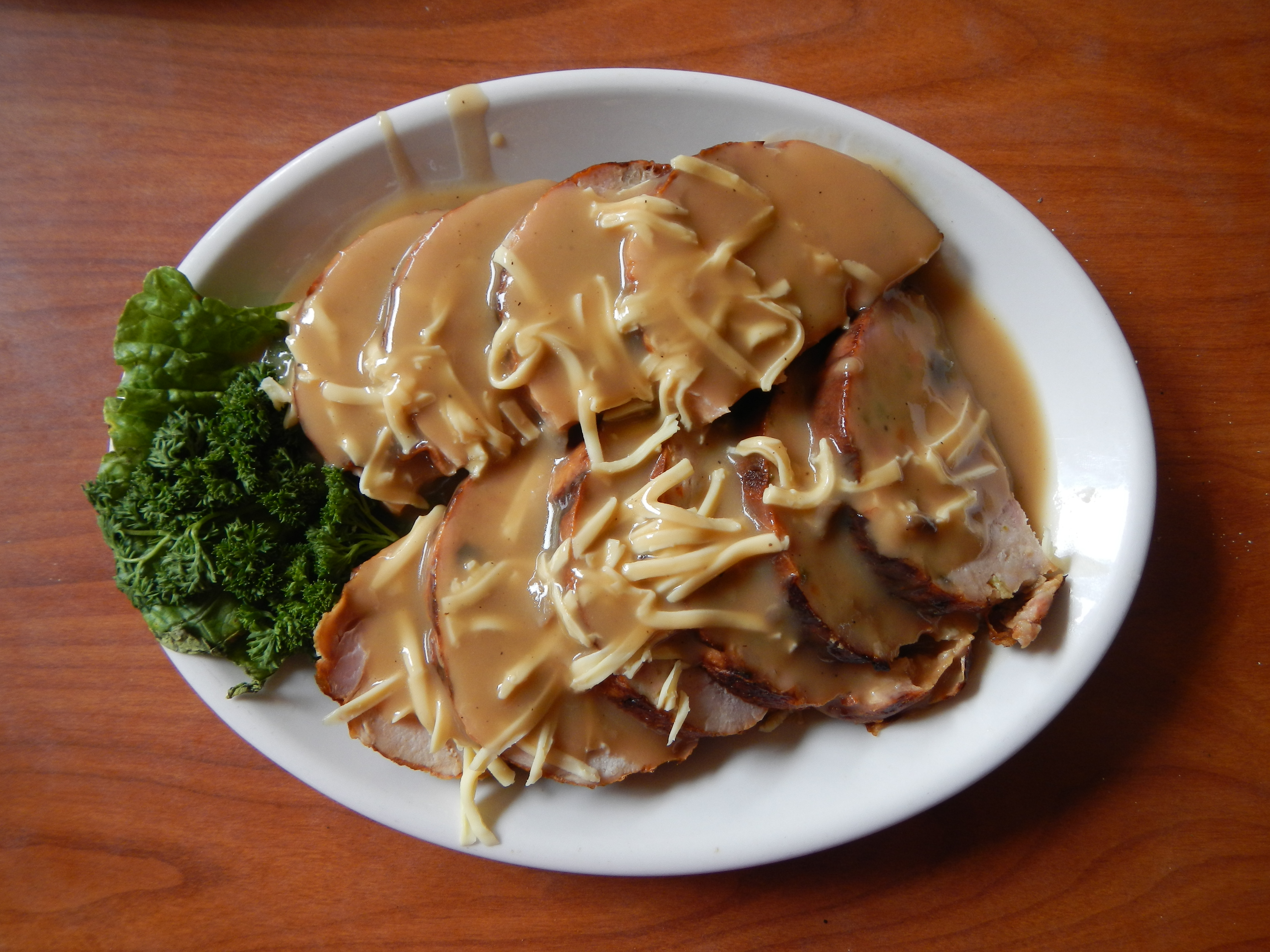
- Chicken galantina with cheese and gravy
- Alternative names: chicken relleno, chicken relyeno, relyenong manok, rellenong manok
- Course: Main course
- Place of origin: Philippines
- Serving temperature: Cold (steamed), Warm (oven-roasted)
- Main ingredients: whole chicken, ground pork, sausage, cheese, hard-boiled eggs, vegetables, spices
- Similar dishes: Galantine; Galantina de pollo Pollo relleno

Chicken galantina, also called as chicken relleno or Filipino relyenong manok, is a Filipino dish made from a steamed or oven-roasted whole chicken stuffed with ground pork, sausage, cheese, hard-boiled eggs, vegetables, and spices. It comes from the 19th-century Spanish dish galantina de pollo also known as pollo relleno in modern Latin America. It traces its roots further to traditional French galantine dishes. Families in the Philippines often serve it during Christmas dinner, known as noche buena. People typically enjoy it with white rice or bread.

== Description ==
Chicken galantina is prepared by deboning the chicken and seasoning it with salt, pepper, calamansi or lemon juice, fish sauce, and soy sauce. The chicken is filled with a mixture of ground pork, hard-boiled eggs, sausages such as chorizo de Bilbao, chorizo de Macao, or Vienna sausage, and other ingredients. These may include ham, bacon, minced red bell peppers, minced carrots, crushed pineapples, onion, pickle relish, raisins, mushrooms, garlic, paprika, butter, black pepper, cheese, flour or soaked white bread, and beaten eggs. The chicken is sewn up and wrapped in cheesecloth or aluminum foil depending on whether it will be steamed or oven-roasted. Steamed galantina is refrigerated and flattened slightly before being sliced into rolls and served. Oven-roasted galantina is cooled for a few minutes before slicing and serving.

== History ==
Early stuffed chicken recipes appear as far back as Roman cooking. The name galantina comes from medieval Latin gelatina, referencing natural gelatin formed during slow cooking to protect and preserve meat.

Eventually, the dish reached the Philippines via 19th-century Spanish galentina de pollo (related to pollo relleno). It evolved into a joyous holiday staple, especially for Noche Buena (Christmas Eve).

== See also ==
- Embutido
- Morcón
