= Hardinera =

Filipino pork meatloaf

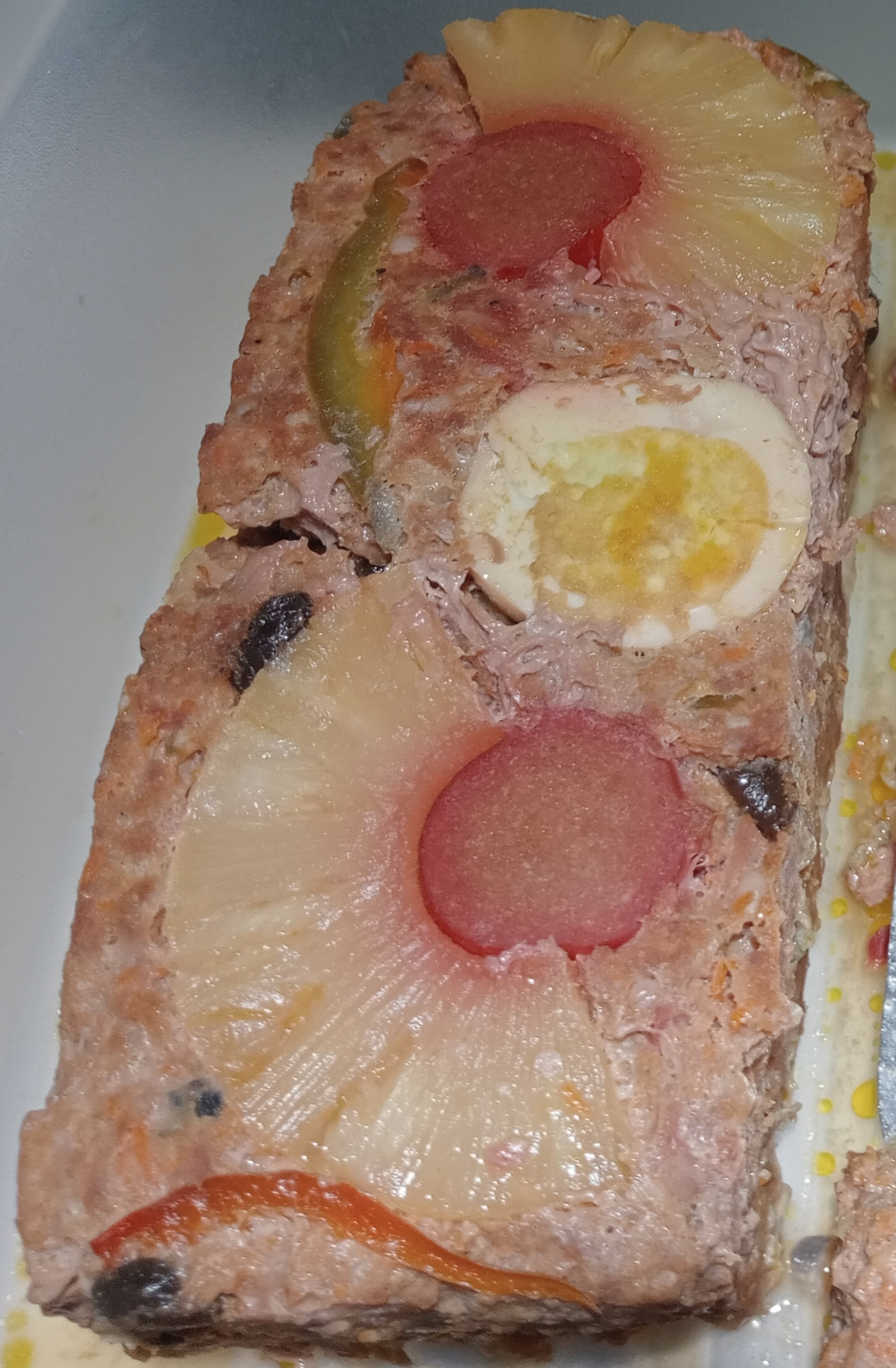
- Alternative names: Jardinera, Quezon meatloaf, Lucban meatloaf
- Course: Main dish
- Place of origin: Philippines
- Region or state: Lucban, Quezon
- Serving temperature: hot, cold
- Main ingredients: diced or ground pork, eggs, raisins, carrots, bell pepper, pineapple, peas, tomatoes
- Similar dishes: embutido. morcón, menudo

Hardinera (Philippine Spanish: jardinera), also known as the Quezon meatloaf or the Lucban meatloaf, is a Filipino meatloaf made with diced or ground pork topped with sliced hard-boiled eggs, pineapples, carrots, bell peppers, peas, tomatoes, and raisins, among others. The ingredients used are identical to the ones used in Filipino menudo; while the cooking process is similar to the Filipino embutido. It is traditionally steamed in an oval-shaped tin mold known as a llanera (or lyanera), which is also used to make leche flan. It originates from the province of Quezon in Luzon Island.

== See also ==
- Everlasting
- Morcón
- Embutido
- List of pork dishes
