= Morcón =

Spanish pork sausage

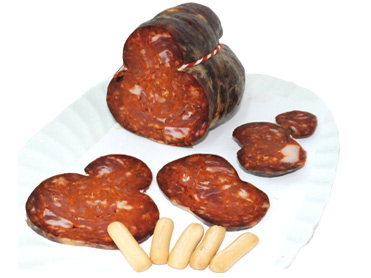
- Course: Sausage
- Place of origin: Spain
- Region or state: Salamanca, Andalusia and Extremadura
- Main ingredients: pork, paprika, garlic and salt

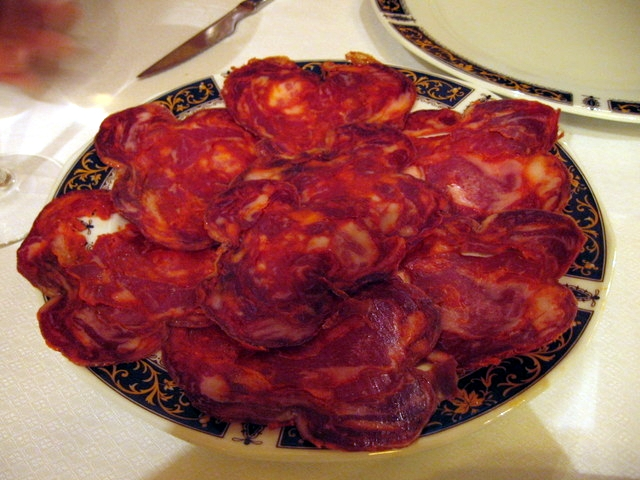
Morcón

Morcón is a type of chorizo, eaten in much the same way. It is typical of the regions of Andalusia and Extremadura and the province of Salamanca. The difference is the meat with which it is made, which is usually lean without much fat content, and that the meat is stuffed into a section of pork large intestine. In Murcia, Albacete and in some Spanish-speaking regions of the Valencian Community, morcón is a sausage made with cooked pork, stuffed in a bladder, similar to mortadella. In the Valle de Ayora there is a variant known by the name perro. In old Spanish from the 16th century it was understood as blood sausage.

The marinade used to flavor the chorizo is mainly composed of paprika, garlic and salt. Due to the thickness of the sausage, the maturity period is quite long.

In the Philippines, the sausage has evolved into a stuffed meat roulade. The meat, which could be beef or pork, is cut into thin sheets and wrapped around hard-boiled eggs, ham, sausages, carrots, pickled cucumber slices and other ingredients to form a solid sausage. The roulade is usually cooked using a stewing and frying technique, and sliced when cool.

== See also ==
- List of stuffed dishes
