= List of bus companies of the Philippines =

This is a list of bus companies that are operating in the Philippines. These companies may manufacture buses, build bus coaches and provide public transport bus service.

== Brands and manufacturers ==
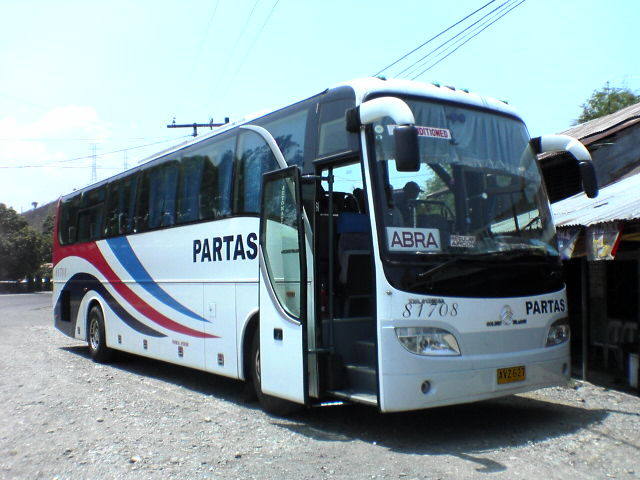
One of the Golden Dragon buses operating in the Philippines, with the Partas Transportation Co. Inc.

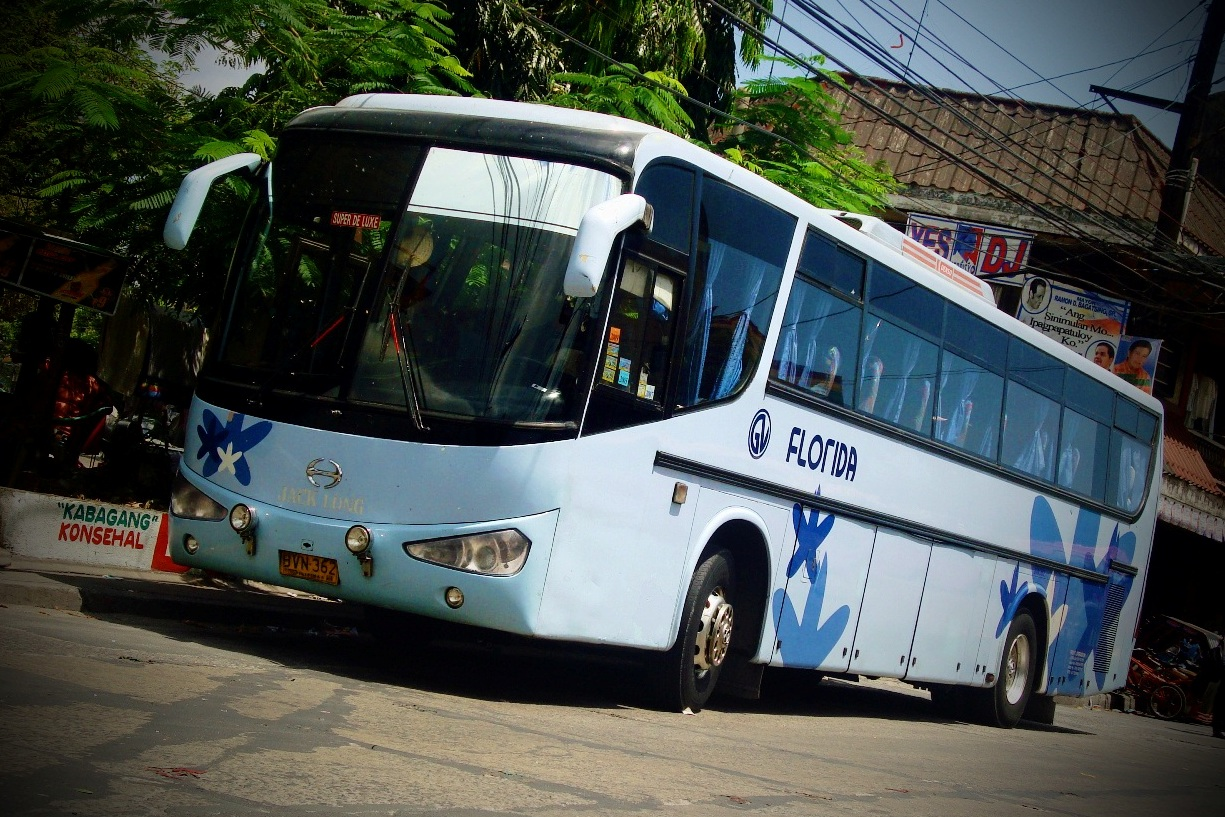
A Del Monte Aero Adamant, operated by GV Florida Transport, Inc. This specific bus uses a Hino RM2P chassis paired with a Hino P11C-TH engine.

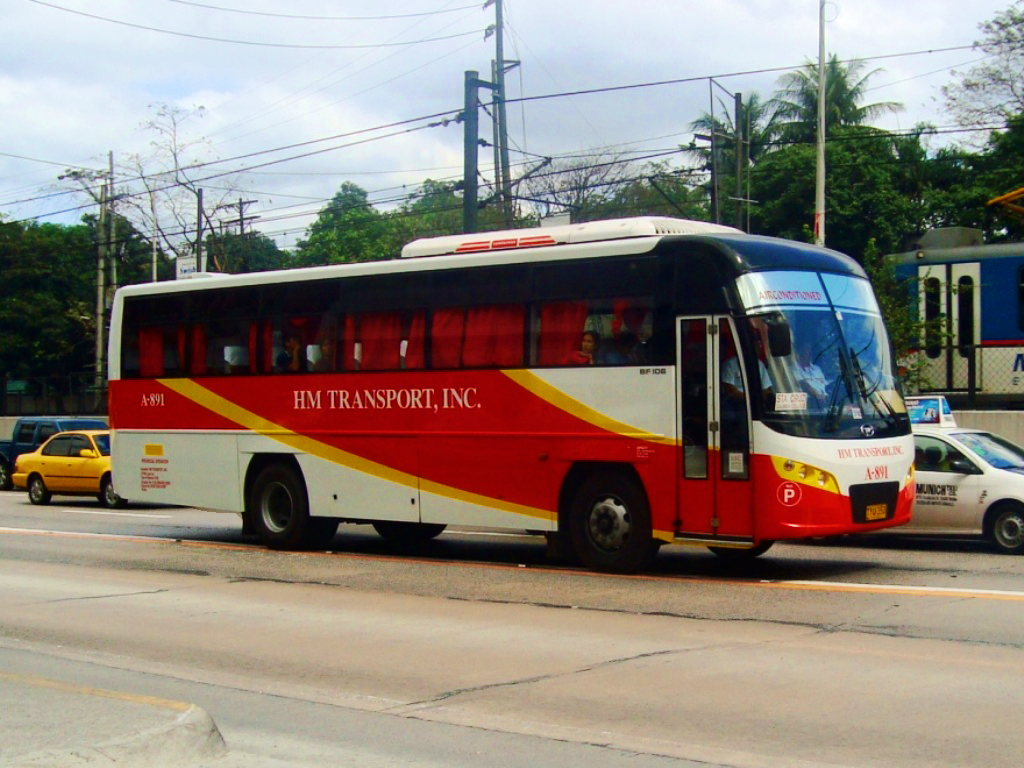
Daewoo BF106 operated by HM Transport Inc. Bodied in the Philippines.

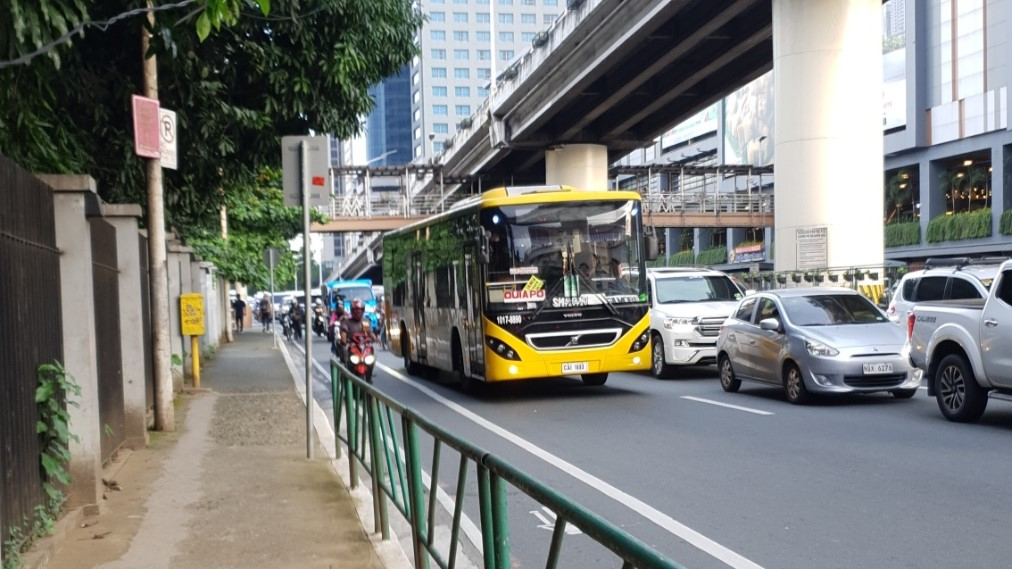
A Volvo B8RLE low-floor bus operated by RRCG Transport.

- Zyle Daewoo Bus, formerly "Zyle Daewoo Commercial Vehicle" – bus manufacturer headquartered in Busan, South Korea
- Golden Dragon – Chinese joint venture company established in 1992 to develop, manufacturing and sell 5m to 18m long luxury buses and light vans with the mark of "Golden Dragon"
- Higer Bus – China's leading exporter of buses and coaches
- Hino Motors – Japanese manufacturer of commercial vehicles and diesel engines, including trucks, buses and other vehicles
- Hyundai Motor Company Philipphines – South Korean multinational automotive manufacturer
- Isuzu – Japanese commercial vehicles and diesel engine manufacturing company headquartered in Tokyo. Its principal activity is the production, marketing and sale of Isuzu commercial vehicles and diesel engines.
- Iveco – is an Italian industrial vehicle manufacturing company based in Turin, Italy. It designs and builds light, medium and heavy commercial vehicles, quarry/construction site vehicles, city and intercity buses and special vehicles for applications such as firefighting, off-road missions, the military and civil defense.
- King Long – bus manufacturing company in Xiamen, Fujian province, People's Republic of China
- MAN Truck & Bus – the largest subsidiary of the MAN SE corporation and one of the leading international providers of commercial vehicles
- Mercedes-Benz buses – has been making buses since 1895 in Mannheim in Germany. Since 1995, the brand of Mercedes-Benz buses and coaches is under the umbrella of EvoBus GmbH, belonging 100% to the Mercedes-Benz Group.
- Fuso – German-owned, Japan-based manufacturer of trucks and buses
- Scania
- Sunlong Bus
- UD Trucks – previously known as Nissan Diesel, its principal business is the manufacture and sales of light, medium and heavy duty diesel trucks, buses, bus chassis and special-purpose vehicles
- Volvo Buses – the world's largest bus manufacturer, with a complete range of heavy buses for passenger transportation
- Wuzhoulong
- Yutong – conglomerate based in Zhengzhou, Henan province, China focused on bus manufacturing as the core business, construction machinery and real estate as the strategic business and at the same time giving attention to other investment portfolios.
- Zhongtong Bus – Zhongtong produces traditional energy/new energy buses and school buses, and RV vehicles.
- Ankai

== Body manufacturers and re-manufacturers ==
- Almazora Motors Corporation
- Columbian Manufacturing Corporation (CMANC)
- Del Monte Motor Works, Inc.
- Hino Motors Philippines Corporation, formerly Pilipinas Hino Inc.
- Nissan Diesel Philippines Corporation - established in 1992 (defunct)

== Bus lines and provincial tour operations ==
- A. Arandia Line – a bus company owned by: Alan Arandia (Mayor of Pio Duran, Albay) plying from Cubao/PITX/Alabang to Bicol Region: Pio Duran, Albay; Donsol, Sorsogon via EDSA/SLEX.
- AAB Bus Lines, Inc. – plies from Ternate/Naic to PITX/Buendia and Zapote.
- AB Liner Inc. – based in Guinayangan, Quezon, it services to and from Metro Manila, Batangas and Quezon Province.
- Agila Bus Transport Corp. – plies Angat/Sapang Palay to Divisoria/PITX. The terminal in Divisoria is near Tutuban station.
- Ah Transport – plies Eastern Portion of Laguna via Lucena and To Infanta.
- Alabang Transport Service Coop. (Alabang TSC) or (ATSC) – plying from Pasay/Marikina/Alabang to Panay destinations and now serving to Guimaras.
- Alga Transport Inc. - Local bus company from Siocon, Zamboanga del Norte it has routes such as Siocon-Dipolog City and Siocon-Zamboanga City
- Alfonso Liner – plies from Pasay to Alfonso via Tagaytay/Imus; with them is Ultrabus, plying the Manila-Eastern Visayas route.
- ALPS The Bus, Inc. – also known as Arcadio Lontoc Perez & Sons (ALPS). It operates from Alabang/Buendia/Cubao/Market Market/PITX to Batangas, completely parts of Bicol Region, Occidental Mindoro, and Iloilo. Also operates point-to-point buses from Robinsons Galleria/SM Megamall to Batangas City/SM Lipa.
- Amihan Bus Lines – a sister company of Philtranco that offers trips to several destinations in the Bicol Region from PITX. Philtranco and its sister company Amihan Bus Lines temporarily ceased operations, but later resumed their operations.
- Annil Transport – its former subsidiary of Yellow Bus Line, that operates in Davao City which is now under Davao Metro Shuttle.
- Antonina Line – one of several bus lines plying the Tabaco City-PITX route.
- Ariel Express – plies from Ternate to PITX
- Aurora Bus Line – plies Cabanatuan To Baler via Nueva Ecija–Aurora Road and Cabanatuan To Dingalan via Palayan–Laur-Gabaldon–Dingalan Road
- Baliwag Transit – a major bus company with operations mainly from and to Manila, Bulacan, Nueva Ecija, Pampanga, Pangasinan and Tarlac.
- Barney Auto Line Group of Companies (BALGCO) Transport – Commonly known as Barney Auto Lines. Travels from Alabang to parts of Bondoc Peninsula and southern Quezon Province, even reaching as far as Santa Elena, Camarines Norte.
- Ballesteros Bus Line Corp. – the other bus company founded in Cagayan Valley. Plies to Ballesteros, Cagayan; Aparri; and Junction Luna in Abulug.
- Batman Starexpress Corporation (BSC) – plies from Nasugbu to Pasay/Batangas City (Inter-provincial route from Nasugbu) via Balayan/Lian/Tuy (Palico) /Tagaytay/Silang/Dasmariñas/Imus/Bacoor/PITX/SM MOA
- Bataan Transit – plies Cubao/Avenida to Balanga/Mariveles in Bataan And San Fernando in Pampanga And San Fernando in La Union.
- Bicol Magayon Bus Line
- Bicol Isarog Transport System – is a bus conglomerate based in Bicol Region and is the sister company of Five Star. Bus companies under Bicol Isarog TSI are Isarog Line, RSL Bus Transport Corporation, Peñafrancia Tours and Travel Transport Inc., V.S. Pintados, Our Lady of Salvacion Bus Lines, Our Lady of Peñafrancia Bus Lines Inc., St. Rafael Transport Lines, Legaspi St. Jude Transport Lines, Cherry Bus, and Florencia Transport Services Inc. with operations in Bicol Region, Eastern Visayas, and Palawan.
- Blessed Grace Express - plies from Indang/Trece Martires City to Baclaran/Pasay/PITX
- B.A.T. TRANSPORT INC
- Bobis Liner – plies Cubao/Pasay/Turbina to Legazpi/Tabaco/Daraga
- Boy Enzo Bus Transport – plies Maragondon, Naic to PITX via CAVITEX
- Cagsawa Travel and Tours, Inc. – plies to Albay and Camarines Sur provinces in Bicol
- Calvo Bus Lines – plies Balamban, Toledo City to Cebu City vice versa
- Candon Bus Line – plies from Avenida to Candon.
- Cattyana Transport
- Cavite Batangas Transport Service Cooperative (CBTSC) – plies Alfonso/Magallanes To Pasay/PITX
- Celyrosa Express – plies Indang/Calatagan to Pasay. The bus company has no route at the moment to Calatagan, Batangas.
- Ciudadano Liner – plied from Roxas City – Tapaz
- Coda Lines – an overnight bus offering trips from Cubao to Bontoc/Sagada in Mountain Province. Uses the HM Transport terminal in Cubao.
- C. Bragais Liner – offers trips from Pasay/PITX to Tabaco City, Albay.
- CUL Transport – Operated by Carolina Uy-Lam. Plied from Pasay/Fairview/Cubao in Quezon City to EDSA Magallanes Interchange SLEX North-South Cupang, Alabang Toll Flyover Plaza via South Luzon Expressway Sorsogon and other parts of Eastern Visayas North-Southbound.
- Cyrus Express & AC Trans
- D' Biel Transportation Company – A bus company in Zamboanga City and has operations in Basilan.
- D' Liner – plies Cabanatuan To Dingalan/Baler
- D' Rising Sun Transport – plies Baguio To Sagada, Bontoc and Besao.
- Daet Express - a bus company operated by Superlines that plies from Daet, Camarines Norte to Cubao, Quezon City.
- Dagupan Bus Company – Now under JAC Liner that plies Tarlac City, Dagupan and Manaoag.
- Dalin Bus Line & Dalin JD Transport — offers trips from Sampaloc, Manila to Cagayan province, particularly Aparri/Santo Niño (Faire)/Solana/Tuguegarao City
- Dangwa Transco
- Davao ACF Bus Lines – Serves routes between Davao City and towns in Davao Occidental.
- Davao Metro Shuttle – Based in Davao, but has a wide range of provincial operations across Mindanao and Visayas—and even reaching as far as PITX in Metro Manila. Under it are the subsidiaries Go-Mindanao and Annil Transport, with the latter serving city shuttle routes within the city of Davao.
- Dingalan Trans - plies Cabanatuan To Dingalan/General Nakar
- Dindo Transport Inc. - A former subsidiary of RTMI, it is currently based in Siocon, Zamboanga del Norte, with operations like Dipolog-Siocon-Sirawai, and Siocon-Roseller Lim-Zamboanga City.
- DLTBCo – Del Monte Land Transport Bus Company – with operations plies from Manila, Cubao EDSA Quezon City to Magallanes Interchange, Makati via SLEX, Mandaluyong EDSA, Northern Samar, Eastern Visayas, Bicol Region, Quezon Province, Southern Luzon, Laguna Province, Batangas Province, Samar and Leyte it offer route also on Tagaytay
- Dionets Liner - plying Trece/Indang to Pasay/Lawton/PITX
- DMMC Travel and Tours Inc. - piles to Albay and Camarines Sur provinces in Bicol to Metro Manila (from PITX).
- Dominion Bus Lines – formerly Times Transit, but a strike put it out of business until a company bought its remains from owner Santiago Rondaris and started a new company. Plies to Vigan City, Ilocos Sur and Bangued, Abra.
- Don Aldrin Transport Inc. (Metro Coastal Transport Inc.) – plying Trece to Pasay, Lawton, and Ayala Bus Terminal.
- Don Don Bus Liner Corporation
- Eaglestar Transit Corp. – Plying Manila to Samar and Leyte provinces. With them is Wega Transport Corp., which expands operations to Davao City.
- EMBC
- EMC LBS Bus Lines - plies the Fairview/Cubao (Kamias) to Santa Ana, Cagayan via Tuguegarao route.
- Elavil Tours Phils., Inc. – offers trips to various destinations in Bicol and Eastern Visayas. Also affiliated with them is AMV Travel and Tours.
- Elizabeth Joy Transport
- Erjohn & Almark Transit Corp. – plies from Mendez/Tagaytay/Dasmariñas/Silang/Nasugbu/Bacoor/Imus;(via Emilio Aguinaldo Highway & Coastal Road) General Mariano Alvarez to Lawton/PITX (via Molino Road/ Bacoor Blvd Bacoor Cavite)
- ES Transport – Plying Avenida/Cubao/Pasay to Cabanatuan N.E./San Miguel, Bulacan.
- Farinas Transit Company – the first bus company to introduce the Hi–Decker King Long XMQ6129. Operates on the part of Ilocos Region. Inter-provincial routes from Baguio to Laoag.
- Ferdinand Liner – plying from Trece Martires, and Indang to Pasay via Aguinaldo Highway
- First North Luzon Transit – plies Cubao/Avenida to Dagupan, San Carlos, Urdaneta, Alaminos, San Isidro and Cabanatuan
- Five Star Bus Company – it is a bus conglomerate and the sister company of Victory Liner which is actually its parent. It operates with its own management and operations. It plies from Manila to parts of northern and central Luzon. With them are Bataan Transit, First North Luzon Transit, and Luzon Cisco Transport.
- Florencia Transport Services Inc. – an interprovincial bus company that plies from Naga City to Lagonoy in Camarines Sur. Affiliated with Bicol Isarog.
- Fred & Cathy Transport
- GCT Transport Services Inc. – a bus company based in Malvar, Batangas, Philippines. It provides shuttle services for employees and organizations, as well as special trip services for private events and group travel.
- Genesis Transport Service Inc. – a bus company plies along Manila to Northern Luzon provinces. With subsidiaries, JoyBus and North Genesis (the former Baguio - Cubao route of Dagupan Bus retained by Genesis Transport Service Inc.). Plies from Manila to Baler, and Baguio to Cabanatuan.
- German Espiritu Liner Inc. – one of the oldest bus companies based in Bulacan and a wholly owned subsidiary of Victory Liner. Its buses travel to Bulakan and Balagtas from Cubao and Divisoria.
- GV Florida Transport – noted for their Pink flower livery, the first to introduce "Sleeper Bus". With GMW Trans as its subsidiary, it offers daily trips from Manila to Cagayan Valley and Ilocos Region.
- Goldtrans Tours – operated by Villegas Transit Corporation. Plies from Legarda/Pasay/PITX to Oras, Eastern Samar and Dinagat Islands.
- Golden Valley Bus Line Corporation
- Golden Bee Transport and Logistics Corporation - sister company of Baliwag Transit.
- Holy Infant Tours
- HLM Shuttle Service
- HM Transport Inc. – is a bus company with headquarters in Biñan, Laguna, primarily offering trips to Calamba City and Santa Cruz, Laguna. Also serves the Ninoy Aquino International Airport route. Sister companies include Silver Star and Worthy Transport Inc and they also have Shuttle Service operations.
- Inocencio Aniceto Transportation – also known as St. Joseph. It is one of the most dominant bus companies in the 1970s and 1980s. Has operations in Northern Luzon, and currently left behind by its competitors. Plies to Dagupan, Alaminos, and San Carlos, Pangasinan.
- JAC Liner — is one of the largest bus company in terms of bus fleet size including their subsidiaries. Under their company are their current affiliates: Pangasinan Solid North Transit, Dagupan Bus Co., Lucena Lines, JAM Liner, and Metro Manila Bus Co. It is a member of the Southern Luzon Bus Operators Associate (Solboa) which operates in the Southern Tagalog provinces.
- Jade & Jeda Liner - plies from Indang/Trece Martires City/Tagaytay to Pasay/PITX/Lawton
- Jumbo Transport
- JAM Liner - Now under JAC Liner that plies Batangas, Laguna and Lucena.
- Jasper Jean Services Inc./Jasper Jean Liner Inc. – plies Dasmariñas To Navotas and Dasmariñas To Maladay via EDSA
- Jariv Transport Cooperative
- Joybus Trasport – a sister company of Genesis Transport, plies Avenida/Pasay/Cubao to Cabanatuan/Baler/Baguio/Dau/Tarlac/Dingalan/San Jose/Balanga/Mariveles
- JRN Liner – plies the routes: Iloilo City – Dacuton and Roxas – Dacuton
- JD Bus Transport
- JV Mencidor Tours
- JVH Transport — offers trips from Metro Manila to Tabaco City in Albay and Bulusan/Gubat/Matnog/Pilar/Santa Magdalena in Sorsogon
- Jay Liner
- Japs Transport – an interprovincial bus line plying the Batangas City-Calamba City (Turbina) route.
- John Tom Express
- Kahok-Dianhok Express Corp.
- Kersteen Joyce Transport – Plies Amadeo/Mendez to Lawton/PITX/Buendia via Tagaytay
- Lazaro Carrier And Transport
- Laforga Trans – under by New Badoc Bus Operators Association.
- Land Car Incorporated – a bus company operated in Davao Region.
- L.B Guyano Liner
- Librando Transit
- Lia Trans Shuttle Service
- Lizamay Express - bus company based on the {{Municipality of Olutanga}}, serving to Zamboanga to Baliguian via Sirawai and Siocon, also Olutanga to Zamboanga via Ipil
- Lorna Express – plies Amadeo/Indang/Mendez/Tagaytay/Trece Martires in Cavite to Pasay/PITX/Plaza Lawton
- Luzon Cisco Transport – a sister company of Five Star, it offers trips from Pasay/Cubao to Cabanatuan City, Guimba, and Talugtug in Nueva Ecija; Tarlac City; Alaminos City and San Fabian in Pangasinan; Santa Cruz in Zambales; and Angeles and Mabalacat cities in Pampanga.
- Marco MMCO Line
- MRR Transport Inc. – the sister company of Raymond Transportation, it offers trips from their shared terminal in Legarda, City of Manila to Infanta, Quezon via Famy, Laguna and Ungos Port in Real, Quezon. Also operating in the Naga City-Lagonoy route.
- Mallen Trans
- Manny Transportation of Cagayan Inc. (Manny Trans)
- Mark Eve's Transit – offers trips from Cubao/Pasay/PITX to Tabaco City in Albay and Bulan/Matnog in Sorsogon via Metro Manila Skyway or SLEX
- Maria de Leon – operating out of Ilocos Norte, it is dubbed "The Fastest Woman on the Road." Currently operated by two different entities: Dimaya family (original owners) and Bataan Transit.
- Mega Bus Line Inc
- Metro Cebu Autobus Corp.
- Narpin Transport
- Nexus Star Corp. – a bus company based in Villasis and the first in the Philippines have WiFi services is provided by Starlink.
- North Genesis Transport – plies Avenida/Pasay/Cubao To Baguio/Tarlac/Baler/Dingalan/Balanga/Mariveles/Cabanatuan/San Jose
- Northern Luzon Bus Lines Incorporated – plies Sampaloc to Baguio/Santiago City/Roxas, Isabela/Maddela, Quirino
- Nor Beli Jun Transit – formerly known as SEMTRAMPCO.
- N. Dela Rosa Liner – The Provincial Operation Division of Dela Rosa Transit operated by Rosauro Dela Rosa, with Dela Rosa Express as their subsidiary, plying the Batangas, Lipa, and Lucena City routes.
- OHAYAMI Trans – Its bus terminal is located in Sampaloc, Manila. With daily trips from Manila to Baguio, Banaue, and Solano. It also has its operations from Baguio to Banaue in Ifugao.
- Oster Liner – plies Balanga, Bataan to Robinsons Starmills, San Fernando, Pampanga
- Pabama Transport – a bus company based in Bukidnon, the first in the Philippines to introduce buses with on-board tablets and provincial tri-axle double-decker buses
- P Bal Transport
- Partas – It is the choice of many travelers from the Ilocos provinces, Baguio, Abra and Mindoro Provinces going to Metro Manila. Also, inter-provincial routes ply from Baguio to Abra, Ilocos Sur, Ilocos Norte, La Union, Cagayan and Isabela provinces.
- Patt Zeus Express
- VS Pintados Inc. – affiliated with Bicol Isarog, it manages the bus conglomerate's Eastern Visayas-bound trips.
- Philippine Island Bus Transport Cooperative – plying Pasay/Alabang to Iloilo
- Philippine Rabbit – once called "The King of the Road", but, after 50 or so years its routes and stops were reduced by a crippling strike. Limits the route to Angeles, Tarlac, Baguio, and Alaminos (Pangasinan).
- PP Bus Lines – the second bus company to ply the Manila-Davao City route after Philtranco. With them is Leyte Biliran Star Bus Corp., its sister company. Inactive since mid 2024. Now only serving northwest Leyte and Biliran area from Manila
- P&O Transportation – travels from Alabang/Pacita Complex to Quezon Province. It has special trips from Araneta Center Bus Port to Naga City. (Not connected with P&O Maritime and P&O Ferrymasters.)
- Queen's Express Inc.
- Raymond Transportation Inc. – has trips to various locations in Quezon, Camarines Sur, Albay, Sorsogon, and Masbate provinces. With them is MRR Transport Inc., which plies from Naga to Caramoan, and Infanta to Manila via Ungos Port in Real, Quezon.
- REM Liner
- RJ Line
- RFV Tours
- Regal Starliner Transport Services Inc.– plies from Silang/Tagaytay/Mendez to PITX/Lawton. The bus company is also now offering trips from Alabang, Muntinlupa to Lawton/PITX via Alabang–Zapote Road.
- Rizal MetroLink Inc. plies Tanay, Rizal to Cainta, Rizal, EDSA Crossing, Shaw in Mandaluyong and Quiapo Manila.
- RJ Express – plies Balagtas and San Isidro to Monumento, Caloocan.
- RMB Bicol Express Transport System Inc. – owned and operated by Raul M. Buban of Albay, it offers trips to Tabaco City, Albay from Pasay/PITX/Robinsons Antipolo.
- Rosing Transportation Inc – plies to Legazpi, Naga, Del Gallego. Owned and operated by Rosita Sodsod.
- RORO BUS Transport- a subsidiary of the Batangas-based Shipping company Montenegro Shipping Lines Incorporated (MSLI) serving the island of Occidental and Oriental Mindoro, Palawan, and also Masbate.
- RRCG Transport – plying Iloilo and Batangas – Alabang/Cubao operated by BusTV by Spin Manila Incorporated. It operates with its sister company, Southern Carrier Co. Inc. They have also routes in inter-Metro Manila and routes in Cainta and Taytay in Rizal.
- R.U. Diaz Trans.- A family-owned Bus line that travels Bicol (Tabaco) to Metro Manila (Pasay, Cubao) and vice versa.
- R. Volante Line – offers Bicol-bound trips, particularly to Pilar, Sorsogon
- Saint Anthony or Padua Transport System, Inc. - plies from Ternate/Cavite City/Dasmariñas/General Mariano Alvarez to PITX/Lawton
- Saint Rose Transit – together with its sister company GPS Transport, it plies the Calamba-Lawton route.
- San Agustin Transport Service Corp. – owned by Tas Trans Group of Companies with operations along parts of Southern Luzon. Under their management were Saint Anthony of Padua Transport Systems Inc., Batman Starexpress Corp. (BSC), Erjohn & Almark Transit Corp., & Richford Bus Lines (a bus company formerly operated by Ariel Bacalan).
- Saulog Transit Inc. – a bus provincial bus company plies the routes from Baguio to Olongapo City, Cavite City, and Ternate, Cavite. Now under Genesis Bus Company.
- Sheena Express – Operated by Gabisan Shipping Lines.
- SMTSCI (Santa Maria Transport Service Cooperative Inc.)
- South Point Carrier Bus, Co. Inc. - a sister bus company of Erjohn & Almark Transit Corp., plies from Nasugbu/Mendez/Tagaytay/Silang/General Mariano Alvarez/Dasmariñas to Lawton/PITX
- St. Gabriel Bus Express Inc. - plies from Ternate/Maragondon to Zapote/PITX. Also serving Nasugbu to PITX via Kaybiang Tunnel and Cavitex.
- St. Joseph Express – sister company of GV Florida Transport.
- St. Jude Transit – formerly under S. M. Buban Line but bought by Bicol Isarog Transport System Inc.; now known as Legaspi St. Jude, it offers trips to Legazpi and Tabaco cities in Albay and Virac in Catanduanes (with the latter via the port of San Andres)
- St. Martha Lines – offers trips from Balibago/PITX to Matnog, Sorsogon.
- Sta. Lucia Express Inc. – plies to Candon City, Ilocos Sur from Avenida, Manila
- SMTSC (Sta. Monica Transport Service Coop.)
- Sunrays Bus Lines – a bus company based in Cebu.
- Silverstar Bus Transportation - plies Cubao, Quezon City and San Pedro, Laguna to Tacloban in Leyte, Maasin and Liloan in Southern Leyte reaching as far as Tagbilaran in Bohol.
- Super 5 Land Transport and Services Inc.
- Superlines – plies routes to Bicol Region and Bondoc Peninsula from Cubao. Its name was taken after the superhero Superman. It runs along with their sister company, Daet Auto Express Transit Inc. which plies up to Daet, Camarines Norte.
- SUPREME – an interprovincial bus company plying the Batangas to Lucena route
- Saint Anthony Of Padua Trans
- TAG Transportation Service Inc
- Ten-Ten Tal Bus
- TAWTRASCO (Tabaco Women's Transport Service Cooperative) – plies to Legazpi and Tabaco cities in Albay and the municipality of Virac in Catanduanes (with the latter reached via direct ferries from Tabaco).
- Tierra de Ibalon Travels and Tour Inc.
- TSF-TSCI (Tarlac San Fernando Transport Service Cooperative Inc.)
- TAS Trans – serving routes from Sta. Rosa City in Laguna to Makati. Also served special routes from Lian/Nasugbu in Batangas to Pasay/PITX/Plaza Lawton
- Unah Klarizze Transport Corp
- Ultrabus - Acronym for United Land Transport and Bus Company, Inc. As an independent company, it was one of the prominent bus operators in the Eastern Visayas region with trips from Araneta Center Cubao and Pasay to Samar and Leyte. Its franchises and operations were later divided into various bus operators: RG Belleza, VS Pintados (under BITSI) and its branding and some of the franchises were later adopted by Alfonso Liner, a Cavite-based operator where Ultrabus' management and main garage is currently located. Now plies from Malibay Pasay to destinations in Eastern Visayas.
- Velmar Bus Lines
- Victory Liner – it is a bus conglomerate and one of the largest bus company in the Philippines and the largest in terms of fleet size excluding their subsidiaries. It offers daily trips from Metro Manila to the different provinces in Northern Luzon (Cagayan Valley, Central Luzon, Ilocos Region, Baguio and Tabuk).
- Viron Transit – owned by millionaire Santiago Rondaris' son; formerly operating as far as the second district of Ilocos Sur but has started to operate as far as Laoag and Bangued, Abra.
- VP Lines - A Bus company that was based in Leyte and can travel to Biliran Island.
- White Stallion Express
- Wega Transportation
- Yanson Group of Bus Companies – a Bacolod-based company, and the owner of the bus brands like Ceres Liner, Rural Transit of Mindanao, Bachelor Express, Ceres Transport, Southern Star Bus Transit, Mindanao Star, Sugbo Transit, and Gold Star Bus Transit.
- Yohance Express Incorporated
- Yellow Bus Lines Incorporated – the oldest bus line in Mindanao, and the second-largest in Mindanao with 200 units, its base terminals are in Koronadal and General Santos. It has been in operation for over 60 years.

=== Within Metro Manila (City Operation) ===
- A&D Express
- AC Trans – Owned by Alberto Carating. Operates between Malanday in Valenzuela and Baclaran in Parañaque City via Ayala. and Malanday – NAIA via EDSA
- Admiral Transport
- Alabang Metro Link – Plies from Navotas to Alabang.
- Alabang Transport Service Coop. (Alabang TSC) (ATSC)
- Apex Commuter Transport
- Arabia Boy Express – a bus company that was operated by Irene Alejandro, plying Alabang (Las Piñas) to Plaza Lawton (Manila) and also, plying from Baclaran to SM Fairview via EDSA Ayala and provincial route: Indang to Pasay formerly under Darla Andrea now ELMS Bus Liner
- ARR Transportation Inc.
- AST Trans
- Baclaran Metro Link – plies from Malanday/Navotas to Baclaran
- Bagong Buhay Transport Service Cooperative (BBTSC) – sister company of Santrans.
- BBL Trans./Balibago Bus Lines – plies Balibago/Pacita/Alabang to Lawton/Lrt Buendia/SM Fairview
- Bensan Trans Corporation – owned by TAS Trans Group of Companies, plying from Alabang/Pilar (Muntinlupa/Las Piñas) – Lawton/Sta.Cruz (Manila)
- BGC Bus (Bonifacio Transport Corporation, formerly The Fort Bus) – A project of Fort Bonifacio Development Corporation plying around Bonifacio Global City
- Bigaa Buslink Transport Inc. - sister company of A.C. Trans
- Bovjen Transport Services Inc. – operated By Alberto Carating, also a sister company of A.C. Trans
- Buslink Transport Inc. - plies Navotas to Baclaran
- CEM Trans – plies Alabang/FTI/Baclaran To SM Fairview/Navotas/Malanday/Grotto/Tungko/Palmera
- CHER Transport – Now under JAC Liner plies the Pacita Complex - Navotas/LRT Buendia/Ayala Makati via EDSA/SLEX/Susana Hits Exit route
- Citylink Coach Services Inc. – an intercity bus company that traverses C–5 Road from Eastwood City, Libis Quezon City to Newport City, Villamor Air Base, Pasay (facing to NAIA Terminal 3). It is operated under First Oceanic Property Management Inc., an affiliate company of Megaworld Corporation.
- Citybus – a bus company based in Novaliches in Quezon City. It plies Novaliches to Alabang via Bicutan and Sucat. (sister company of Five Star)
- Commuters Bus Corp.
- Darla Andrea
- Darj Trans Co. (Under RBM)
- Dela Rosa Transit – sister company of N. Dela Rosa Liner
- Del Monte City Transit Corp. – plies Sapang Palay to Baclaran and to Sta Cruz, Manila
- Delta NeoSolutions (DNS) - P2P bus operator, also the biggest shuttle bus operator in the Philippines
- Diamond Star Transit Services Inc.
- Diamond V-Eight Transport – plies the SM Fairview – Baclaran via Quezon Ave route
- Dragon Lotus Liner Corp. – plies Grotto To Baclaran
- Draven Bus
- DSN Business Partners Transport Inc. – plies the Pala-Pala To Navotas via EDSA route. Also owns Armi Josh Transport, Tessele One Line Inc. and MJ Sunville Transport.
- EA Diamond Starline Corporation – formerly known as EL Palma Transport. With major route of Baclaran to Malanday and provincial route of Pasay to some parts of Visayas.
- E&E Royal Couple Bus Inc.
- Earth Star Express – sister company of ES Transport; has routes between Sapang Palay – Sta. Cruz, SM Fairview – Baclaran via Quezon Ave. and Alabang – SM Fairview
- EMBC or Eastern Metropolitan Bus Corporation – It plies the same route as Rizal Metrolink Inc.
- ELMS Bus Liner – plies the Alabang to Plaza Lawton route. And also with them subsidiaries; Shem Transport and Arabia Boy Express.
- EOS Transport Corporation
- EPJ Transit
- ES Transport – Plies the Sapang Palay to Sta Cruz via Bocaue/Sta. Maria in Bulacan and Malinta in Valenzuela and Baclaran to SM Fairview via Ayala, Quiapo, Lawton route
- First Metro Bus Express Inc. - A newly formed bus brand after the purchase of Newman Goldliner's franchise (operated by First North Luzon Transit and sister company of Five Star).
- Fairview Bus Inc. – plies the Baclaran to SM Fairview route.
- Fermina Express – plies the Baclaran – SM Fairview via Ayala and Lagro – NAIA routes
- Franchesca Mae Grajiel Transport Inc.
- Fran-Vill Transit Inc. (formerly FVTI)
- Funride Transport (formerly WLH Trans/WLLH Liner/Maggi Liner) – operating from Plaza Lawton (Manila) – SM Southmall (Las Piñas) via Coastal Rd.
- Gasat Express – Plies from Alabang to Fairview with a provincial route to Iloilo.
- G Liner – owned and operated by De Guia Enterprises Inc. It operates routes from Taytay and Cainta in Rizal to Quiapo, Manila via Manila East Road, Ortigas Avenue, and Magsaysay Blvd.
- Greenline Express – Baclaran to SM Fairview.
- Green Frog Hybrid Bus
- Green Star Trans – plying Taytay – Quiapo via Cainta and Ortigas Ave.
- GPS Transport – under Saint Rose Transit
- Hi-Star Transport Inc.
- Hilltop Tours Inc. (under RBM)
- HM Transport Inc. – plying Alabang to Lawton, SM Fairview to Quiapo, and SM Fairview to Baclaran.
- HR Lines
- Ismael Bus Line ( IBL Inc.) – undermanaged by Pinagrealan Tours and plying NAIA – Grotto via EDSA (They operated before the Navotas – Baclaran via EDSA and San Mateo – Divisoria via Aurora Blvd.)
- Jackpherlyn Transport
- Jasper Jean Services Inc./Jasper Jean Liner Inc. – plies the Pala-Pala to Navotas and Pala-Pala to SM Fairview routes
- Jell Trans Inc.
- Jetbus Travel and Tours
- JFT Liner
- Joanna Jesh Transport – has routes from Alabang to Navotas and Fairview
- Joben's Bus Express
- JoyBus Transport
- Joyselle Express Inc.
- JANMARK Shuttle
- JNL Paet Transport Co.
- Kellen Transport – plies Grotto To Baclaran
- Kelly Transport
- Kingsam Express – plies Alabang/Baclaran to Malanday
- Laguna Starbus (Starbus) – plies Alabang/Baclaran to Malanday (sister company of Five Star)
- Lippad Trans – plies Alabang/Baclaran to SM Fairview
- Ma-fel Transit Corporation – plies Baclaran To Grotto,San Jose del Monte
- Magicline Express Corporation – plies Sapang Palay To Baclaran And Palmera, San Jose del Monte To Baclaran
- Malanday Metro Link – plies Malanday, Valenzuela to Alabang and Baclaran.
- Maluto Transportation and Travel Corp. – (also known as Igan The Friendly Bus) – plying Alabang (South Station) – Plaza Lawton via Las Piñas and Coastal Road
- Marthel Transport Inc. (former A. Prado)
- Mayamy Transport Corporation – plies the same route Of sister company (Magicline Express Corporation)
- McArthur Express – operated by JMA Transport/Kingsam Express
- Mersan Snow White Transport Corp.
- Mersan (Subsidiary of Santrans)
- Metro Express Connect, Inc - has various routes to and from Makati
- Metro Manila Bus Co. (MMBC) – owned by JAC Liner Inc., it plies the Baclaran – SM Fairview (via EDSA) and Baclaran – SM Fairview (via Quiapo).
- MSJ Tours
- NAIA Metro Link – from NAIA to SM Fairview and NAIA to Malanday.
- Nathaniel Bus Line – Plying Asturias – Ayala Avenue route from PVP Liner
- Nicholas Albert Transport
- Nuestra Senora Del Carmen Transport – Plying from Baclaran in Paranaque City, Ayala in Makati and Cubao in Quezon City to the municipalities of Bocaue and Sta. Maria, Bulacan via NLEX
- Original Transport Service And Multi Purpose Cooperative (OTSMPC)
- Our Vineyard Transport Corp. (formerly Aerobus)
- Pamana Transport Services Inc. – plies the Baclaran to Malanday route.
- Pandacan Transport Service Inc.
- Paña Liner (Paña Bus Liner)
- Pascual Liner Inc.
- Pitbull Bus Transport Corporation (PBT Corp.) – From FTI to Navotas.
- Precious Grace Transport – plies from Naia to Malanday and Naia to Grotto
- P2P Bus (Premium Point-to-Point Bus Service, formerly Express Connect) – a joint venture between private city bus companies (Delta NeoSolutions, RRCG Transport System, MetroExpress Connect and Ube Express) DOTr and LTFRB with a fleet of "premium" express bus service plying around Katipunan, Ayala Center, SM MOA, Mandaluyong and Alabang Town Center in Muntinlupa
- Prince McKhaine Transport – formerly Divine Transport, Inc.
- Princess Youhan And Chrisa Transport
- Reinalyn Bus Lines Corp. – formerly ALTRANSCO, it operates in Las Piñas & Muntinlupa, plying route of Alabang (Muntinlupa) – Plaza Lawton (Manila) via Las Piñas, Coastal Road
- Rainbow Express Inc.
- RBM Grand Rally Trans, Inc.
- Regal Starliner Transport Services Inc. – has a franchise route of Alabang to Plaza Lawton, a city operation route
- Reinalyn Bus Lines Corporation
- Renan Transit
- Rizal MetroLink Inc. – plies from Cainta to Tanay, Rizal via Antipolo
- Roval Transport Corp.
- ROV Transport – plies Navotas to Baclaran via EDSA Ayala
- RRCG Transport – a bus company that operated in city & provincial, plying Alabang – Navotas via EDSA, Baclaran – SM City Fairview via EDSA Ayala Taytay/Cainta – Quiapo via Ortigas Ave. and Siniloan – PICC via EDSA – Ayala, Tanay. Owned and operated by EMBC and Rizal Metrolink Inc.
- RU Diaz Transport
- RMB Transport
- RJ Line
- RS Master Inc. – owned by Northstar Transport Inc.
- SPS Transit, Inc. (Severino Policarpio Santos Transit) – formerly known as SST (Severino Santos Transit) it plies the Baclaran To Sapang Palay via Edsa and Santa Cruz to Sapang Palay via A. Bonifacio Ave./Nlex/Marilao routes.
- Safeway Bus Lines Inc.
- Saint Rose Transit
- Santrans Inc. – plies the Baclaran (via EDSA/NLEX)/Santa Cruz (via NLEX/Marilao) To Muzon/Sapang Palay routes.
- San Agustin – plies from Las Liñas to Makati/PITX/Plaza Lawton.
- Seven Sky Express Liner Corp. (formerly Malanday Gold Express Corp.)
- Shanine and Pauline (formerly Erwin Express and Las Ninas) plying from Gil Puyat LRT Station in Pasay and Ayala in Makati to the municipalities of Bocaue, Sta. Maria, Norzagaray and Angat in Bulacan via NLEX
- South City Express Inc.
- St. Martin of Tours Trailways Inc. – sister company of Pamana Transport Services Inc. Plies the same route.
- Stargems Line Inc. (formerly Corimba Express)
- Stella Mae Star Bus
- SVS Southlink Express
- Taguig Metro Link – from Taguig to Fairview.
- TAS Trans Corp. – plying from Alabang/Pilar (Muntinlupa/Las Piñas) – Lawton/Santa Cruz (Manila)
- Tenten TAL Transportation.

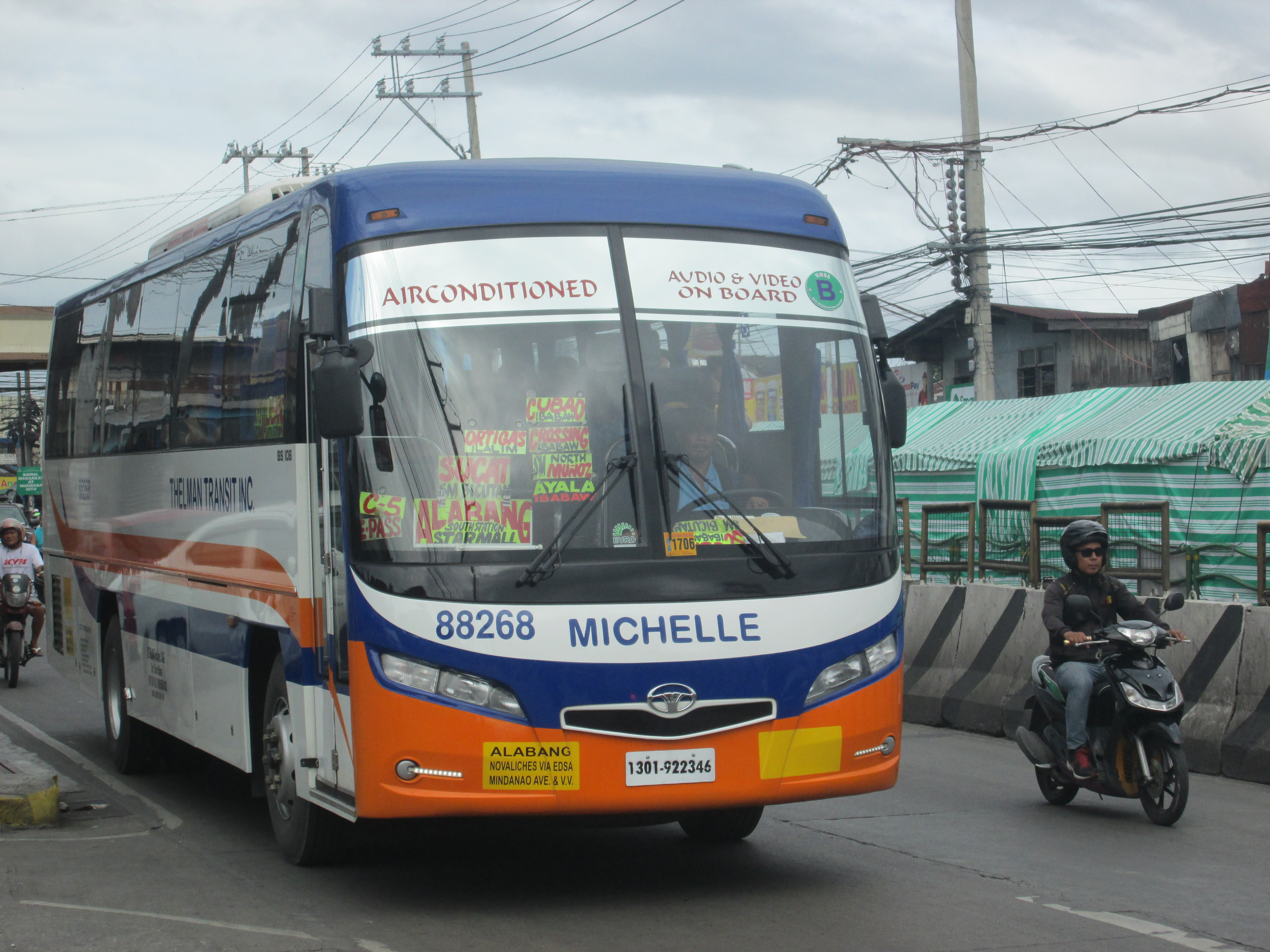
Daewoo BS106 of Thelman Transit, Inc.

- Thelman Transit Inc.
- UV Grand Tours
- UBE Express
- Unicab Transport
- V-1 Bus Line
- Valenzuela Transport Service Cooperative
- Vil 5000 Incorporated
- Valisno Express – sister company of Gasat Express and also has a Provincial Operation from Cubao to Iloilo
- Viofel Transport Incorporated – plies Baclaran/Alabang to SM Fairview via Quiapo/Lawton Manila Lagusnilad Underpass
- Voyager Express Liner
- Worthy Transport Inc. (under HM Transport)
- Yash And Mckhaine Transport Inc.
- Yohance Express Inc. – plies the Alabang to Novaliches via C5, Pacita to Novaliches via Malinta Exit and FTI to Navotas routes (under CEM Trans Group).

=== City Operations Outside Metro Manila ===
- Clark Loop - bus rapid transit system operating within the grounds of Clark Freeport Zone.
- Davao City Interim Bus Service
- MyBus - a modern, air-conditioned public transportation system in Metro Cebu offering fixed-rate, scheduled transit across major business hubs, malls, and the airport.
- CiBus - modern city bus transit system serving as a precursor and backbone to the city's broader Bus Rapid Transit (BRT) project. Operated by Yanson Group of Bus Companies.

== Defunct bus lines ==
- Alro Transport Corp.
- Arayat Express – plies Cabanatuan To Arayat, Olongapo, San Fernando, Cabiao and Gapan.
- Armi Josh Transport - formerly Aicer Trans, franchise taken over by DSN Business Partners Transport Inc. Last served Quezon Avenue to EDSA-Taft route.
- Annil Transport
- Baes Express – plies from Trece Martires/Indang to Pasay
- Bagong Silang Transport Service and Multipurpose Cooperative (BSTSMC) – plying Bagong Silang in North Caloocan to Sta.Cruz, Manila via Novaliches and Malinta Exit.
- Batangas Laguna Tayabas Bus Company (BLTBCO) – formed in 1918 and was one of the most dominant bus companies until it became bankrupt in the early 2000s. BLTB was a member of the Southern Luzon Bus Operators Associate (Solboa) which operates in the Southern Tagalog provinces. Now revived and operated by Del Monte Motor Works under the name DLTBCo.
- Batangas Starexpress Corporation (BSC) - Last plies the Cubao/Buendia/PITX to Batangas City/Batangas Pier/Batangas City Grand Terminal and SM City Lipa, Batangas.
- BCB Transport Inc. - franchises divided between Worthy Transport Inc. and CEM Trans Services Inc.
- Benguet Auto Line was a bus company under Philippine National Railways, with a train connection from Rosario, La Union to Baguio via Kennon Road. It was founded in 1906 as the mail carrier of the Bureau of Posts. At its height, it operated 150 buses plus 50 freight trucks.
- Buslink Transport Inc. - last served Monumento to EDSA-Taft, and NLET to Cubao routes. Currently serves as a tourist bus.
- Busway Philippines Inc. (later renamed to Pamana Transport)
- C.A Rodriguez Lines – Owned and operated by Carmen A. Rodriguez. Plied to Lawton – Cavite City. Sister company of Saint Anthony of Padua (now under San Agustin Transport Corporation), R.A Rodriguez Lines, City Rama Bus Corp, and Car San Juan Transport.
- Calamba Megatrans Inc. - formerly a part of JAM Liner with unique livery (white at the top and red at the bottom with yellow and orange ribbons strap and with "JAM Liner" naming scheme instead of just "JAM") which was exclusive for Calamba and Lucena trips only. Those JAM buses with unique livery was the later rebranded to Calamba Megatrans Inc. after its franchises was taken over by HM Transport Inc. which results to stop its Lucena trips and JAM Liner handed over its Calamba trips to Calamba Megatrans Inc. It was then absorbed to HM Transport Inc.
- California Bus Lines
- Canhagimet Bus Lines- Eastern Visayas based company running trips from Samar/Leyte to Manila.
- Cavite Transport - served Alfonso to Baclaran, Parañaque/Pasay.
- CC JRC Liner - Plying between Santo Tomas, Davao del Norte and Davao City, which was acquired by Bachelor Express Inc. in 2014.
- City Rama Bus Corporation
- CHER Transport - Rebranded to Metro Manila Bus Co. after being acquired by JAC Liner Group.
- Cign Transport - renamed to EOS Transport Corporation.
- Claro Trans – operated by JFT Liner plying from Alabang to SM Fairview via Lagro
- D' Rough Riders Inc. – acquired and now operated by Sugbo Transit under Yanson Group of Bus Companies.
- Dakicyn Transit – operated as Joncy Liner and plied Maragondon, Cavite to Plaza Lawton route.
- DCOMMP Transport—The franchise was sold to HM Transport Inc., later rebranded as Tessele One Line Inc., and later taken over by RMB Bicol Express Transport System Inc.
- Del Norte Fighters
- Delta Transport Inc. - renamed Tessele One Line Inc., later taken over by DSN Transport and RMB Bicol Express Transport System Inc.
- Desert Fox
- Dimple Star Transport – plying Iloilo – España/Cubao/Pasay and Alabang – Lawton via Skyway for city operations. Franchise was revoked after a road mishap in Occidental Mindoro.
- Don Mariano Transit Corp. plies from Novaliches to Pacita and Baclaran via EDSA – Mindanao Avenue. Its franchise was revoked due to an accident along the Skyway above the South Luzon Expressway (SLEx) in 2013.
- Edmond Lines – plied from Naic, Cavite to Plaza Lawton in Manila.
- EJRC Marikina Transit
- El Palma Bus Liner
- Elena Liner – Franchise revoked by LTFRB as of 2014
- EMC Transportation Inc. – was once a major bus company in northern Luzon until it went bankrupt in mid-2008 and was bought by Northstar Transport. It offers daily trips from Manila to Cagayan Valley and vice versa.
- Everlasting Transport Co. (under Heaven Blessed Bus Line Express Inc.)
- Feraer Liner - Served Indang / Trece Martires City to Baclaran / Pasay via Aguinaldo Highway.
- Fides Express Inc. – plying Navotas – Baclaran via EDSA and Montalban – Divisoria via San Mateo, Aurora Blvd.
- Froehlich Tours Inc. - Franchise has expired as of 2020. Used to operate a diverse fleet of Chinese brands and a handful of locally distributed/assembled European models, and one of the original P2P operators since its launch, the company ceased operations due to severe financial problems from debt aside from failure to renew their franchise, with the owner allegedly having links to the Wirecard scandal.
- Gloren Transport – plying from Baclaran to SM Farview via Lagro. Now renamed ROV Trans.
- GM Tours – plying Caticlan – Iloilo route. Now taken by YGBC Ceres Liner.
- Golden Highway Transit Inc.
- Grand Courier
- Grand Star Coach Bus Co. Inc.
- Green Star Express – franchises taken over by LLI Bus Co. Inc. and South City Express Inc.
- Guardian Angels Bus Line Inc.
- Island City Express, Inc. – operated by Mindanao Star plied to Davao City – Island Garden City of Samal route. It became a part of the Yanson Group of Bus Companies (YGBC) after completely bought Holiday Bus' sister company in 2018. The line is now taken by Bachelor Express.
- Jayross Lucky Seven Tours – plies the Baclaran/Alabang to SM Fairview/Grotto/Tungko/Palmera route. Last plied the SM Fairview - PITX and Antipolo - Cubao routes until its closure in February 2026.
- JB Line Bicol Express – plied to Bicol. Now reduced to a jeepney company, that plies Sorsogon City – Gubat, Sorsogon route.
- Jethro Liner – plying Maragondon/Naic/Indang in Cavite to PITX/Plaza Lawton
- JKJ Express – operated by Kellen Transport and former sister company of CHER Transport Corp. Now absorbed by Earth Star Express
- JMA Transport - last served Monumento to EDSA-Taft route.
- JRMS Goldensky Transport Inc. – plying Malanday (Valenzuela) – Alabang (Muntinlupa) via EDSA, Bicutan and Sucat or Skyway. Last served the Monumento to EDSA-Taft route.
- J.S. Vergara Lines (now San Agustin Transport Corporation)
- Juaymah Maureen Transport – founded by Oscar Mababangloob, it operates from Alabang in Muntinlupa and Pacita in San Pedro, Laguna going to Lawton via SLEX Osmena Highway, Quirino Avenue, and Taft Avenue. (franchise taken over by South City Express Inc.)
- Kapalaran Bus Lines – A bus company that plies in Sta. Cruz, Laguna to Lawton or LRT Buendia and Infanta, Quezon to Legarda.
- King of Kings Transport - established in 1993
- KL Transport - sister bus company of Batangas Starexpress Corp. (BSC), served Batangas City to Buendia, Pasay route.
- Laguna Express Inc. - franchises taken over by LLI Bus Co. Inc.
- Laguna Travelers - served Lawton to Sta. Cruz, Laguna and Lucena City
- Lillian Express Inc. – a bus company based in Dipolog City in the Philippines. It served bus routes to the Zamboanga Peninsula. Its buses and route network were merged with Rural Transit and Bachelor Express after it was bought out completely by the Yanson Group of Companies in 2005.
- Luzon Bus Inc. – sister company of Santrans. Operated by Esmeraldo P. Santos with operation of Sapang Palay to Baclaran, Sapang Palay to Baclaran via Marilao, and some 11 units of Mersan (Yutong) with operation of Sapang Palay to LRT Ayala and some units of BBTSC with operation of Sapang Palay to Sta Cruz, Manila. Last served Quezon Avenue to Angat route.
- Luzon Bus Line – was established by the Manila Railroad Company to compete against private bus companies.
- MAC Lines Inc. – plying Montalban – Divisoria via San Mateo, Aurora Blvd.
- Mannrose Liner Inc. – plies the Baclaran to SM Faiview route. Last plied the SM Fairview (Nova Stop) – Ayala via Quezon Avenue, East Avenue, and EDSA / MRT GMA Kamuning, and the SM Fairview – PITX (Parañaque Integrated Terminal Exchange) via Quezon Avenue routes.
- Marikina Auto Line Transport Corporation (MALTC) – plies (Montalban – Baclaran via EDSA, Ayala, Aurora Blvd.), (San Mateo – Baclaran via EDSA, Ayala, Commonwealth Ave., Batasan Road), and (Navotas – Baclaran via EDSA, Ayala) Inactive (possibly halted operations and trips) since June 2025.
- Metro Manila Transit Corporation (MMTC) – was established in 1974 by the Philippine government with an Executive Order from then President Marcos. The operation was crippled by the EDSA People Power Revolution in 1986, and later became bankrupt in 1995. On the defunct MMTC shattered into four bus companies – United Workers Transport Corp. (Went bankrupt in 2009), DCOMMP (Drivers, Conductors, Mechanics Multipurpose) Transport Service Cooperative, Filcomtrans (went bankrupt in 1999), and Fastrans (went bankrupt in 2007).
  - Love Bus - a premium bus line operated by MMTC from 1976 to the 1990s. It was known for operating the first air-conditioned buses in Manila and was considered a cultural icon during its operational years.
- MGP Trans – Franchise revoked by LTFRB as of 2014
- Mindanao Express – a bus company which was later became under San Agustin Transport Corporation and Erjohn & Almark Transit Corp. plying Lawton and Pasay to Nasugbu, Batangas despite having "Mindanao" on its name.
- Mindanao Rapid Co., Inc. (MINRAPCO) - A transportation company which operated in Cotabato
- NAFTI Transport – once owned by Cher Transport, it plied the FTI – Navotas via EDSA route. Last served the EDSA Carousel and Monumento - EDSA Taft routes.
- New RL Transport Corporation (franchise now operated by Pangasinan Solid North Transit)
- Newman Goldliner Inc. – plied the Baclaran to Fairview route. Last served Cubao to Montalban route. Franchise taken over by First Metro Bus Express.
- Nova Auto Transport - renamed to Fairview Bus route
- N.S. Transport Services, Inc. – last served the Quezon Avenue to Montalban and Fairview to Ayala routes.
- Pampanga Bus Company (PAMBUSCO) – plies towns in Pampanga from their terminus. Formerly known as La Mallorca PAMBUSCO.
- Pangasinan Transportation Company (PANTRANCO) – a bus company plying to Pangasinan.
- Panda Coach Tours and Travel Inc. – Its franchise was revoked by the LTFRB in 2017 due to an accident in Tanay that left fifteen people dead.
- Panther Express - Plies routes from Avenida, Manila to Balanga and Mariveles in Bataan and San Fernando, La Union.v
- Perlado Liner - served Indang/Trece Martires to Baclaran/Pasay/Lawton
- Phil. Touristers Inc. – A city operations subsidiary under Philtranco. Plying Pacita – Navotas via EDSA route. Last served EDSA Carousel, and PITX to General Mariano Alvarez routes.
- PNR Motor Service – a bus company under Philippine National Railways with subsidiaries Bengued Auto Line and the Cavite Line Transportation whole of Luzon. The company has so far invested P24.22 million for the acquisition of 154 bus units now operating in the whole of Luzon.
- Philippine Corinthian Liner Inc. – Established in 1997, it was owned by singer-entrepreneur Claire de la Fuente. The franchise was canceled by LTFRB permanently in 2011 for joining a transportation strike which took place in 2010
- Philippians Bus Line Inc. – sister company of Newman Goldliner. Plying from Grotto to Baclaran. Last served Cubao to Antipolo route.
- Philtranco – The oldest bus company In Asia and in the Philippines, it started in 1914; its former company name is Albert Louis Ammen Transportation Company (ALATCO) and Pantranco South Express Inc. With Philtranco is their affiliate Amihan Bus Lines (former AMA Transit). It was a member of the Southern Luzon Bus Operators Associate (Solboa) which operates in the Southern Tagalog provinces. Philtranco and its sister company Amihan Bus Lines temporarily ceased operations, but later resumed their operations; routes is now under Yohance Express Incorporated via Metro Manila Skyway (Nichols Interchange in Taguig), SLEX, Maharlika Highway (from PITX, Pasay to Cagayan De Oro).
- PVP Liner - Based in Sta. Ana, Manila, it was founded in 1984 by Panfilo V. Parajillo as a sole proprietorship. It was noted for its starry livery and was dubbed as "Morning Star" (later "Rising Star") with its units mainly consist of Hino Busses. Plies routes from Quiapo-Guadalupe via JP Rizal; FTI-Navotas via EDSA; and Asturias-Ayala. It ceased operations around 2013 following City of Manila's ban on the entry of city busses on the issues of terminal. Now acquired by Nathaniel Bus Line (began operations in 2016) for its former routes with the rest of its assets now used by other companies.
- R.A Rodriguez Bus Lines - In 2019, several officials from the Department of Finance were found guilty in issuing fraudulent tax credit certificates to this company.
- Ramtrans- formerly plying the routes from Pasay to Cabanatuan, Nueva Ecija
- RCJ Lines – an offshoot of the successful RCJ Trucking corporation. They also operate RCJ Trans, plying the Manila - Laoag and Vigan routes.
- Road Master Transport – plying Dagupan – Tuguegarao. Now acquired by Victory Liner.
- Safeway Express - a bus company served Indang/Trece Martires to Coastal Mall, Parañaque/Baclaran/Pasay route.
- San Quintin Bus Lines, Inc. - plies the Cubao To San Quintin via Tayug routes. Formerly Santrans' provincial routes. Now renamed and under Luzon Cisco Transport.
- Shem Transport - franchise taken over by Alabang Transport Service Cooperative
- Sierra Madre Transportation - now acquired by First North Luzon Transit
- South Luzon Crown Transport, Inc. (formerly known as Crow Transport Services, Inc.) – owned by Genesis Transport Service, Inc. and operated routes in western Batangas and upland Cavite. In 2008, Erjohn & Almark acquired the assets and operations of South Luzon Crown Transport.
- SSG Liner - based in Brgy. Fatima, Liloy, Zamboanga del Norte, it ceased operations in 2023 after the lack of an LTFRB license, it once served Siocon, Zamboanga, Dipolog, Liloy, Ipil, Imelda, Liloy, Good, and Siayan
- Sta. Rita Transport Inc. - last served Monumento to EDSA-Taft route.
- Stargreen Line Incorporated – plies Pacita,San Pedro To Novaliches, Quezon City. Last served Quezon Avenue to Montalban route.
- TRITRAN - was a member of the Southern Luzon Bus Operators Associate (Solboa) which operates in the Southern Tagalog provinces Acquired by Jose Alvarez' Penta Pacific Realty in 1999 which also operated Philtranco and formed a group of other bus companies which it inherited during that time and for a few years into the early 2000s Tritran itself would come under the Alvarez-run PSEI group of bus companies. Later rebranded into JAM Liner in 2004 replacing the original JAM Transit, another Southern Luzon operator also its sister company under the Philtranco umbrella.
- Times Transit Inc. - renamed as Dominion Bus Line
- Viva Aladdin Transit
- Universal Guiding Star Bus Line Corp. – sister company of Everlasting Bus Co., Inc. Also plied the Manila -Cagayan Valley route via Bulacan area, SCTEX, and TPLEX route.
- Weena Express Inc. – was a Davao-based bus company plies to Davao – Cotobato. The company was sold to Bachelor Express Incorporated and rebranded as Mindanao Star, following Valdevieso's struggle to manage the company.

== Gallery ==
Provincial/City/operations

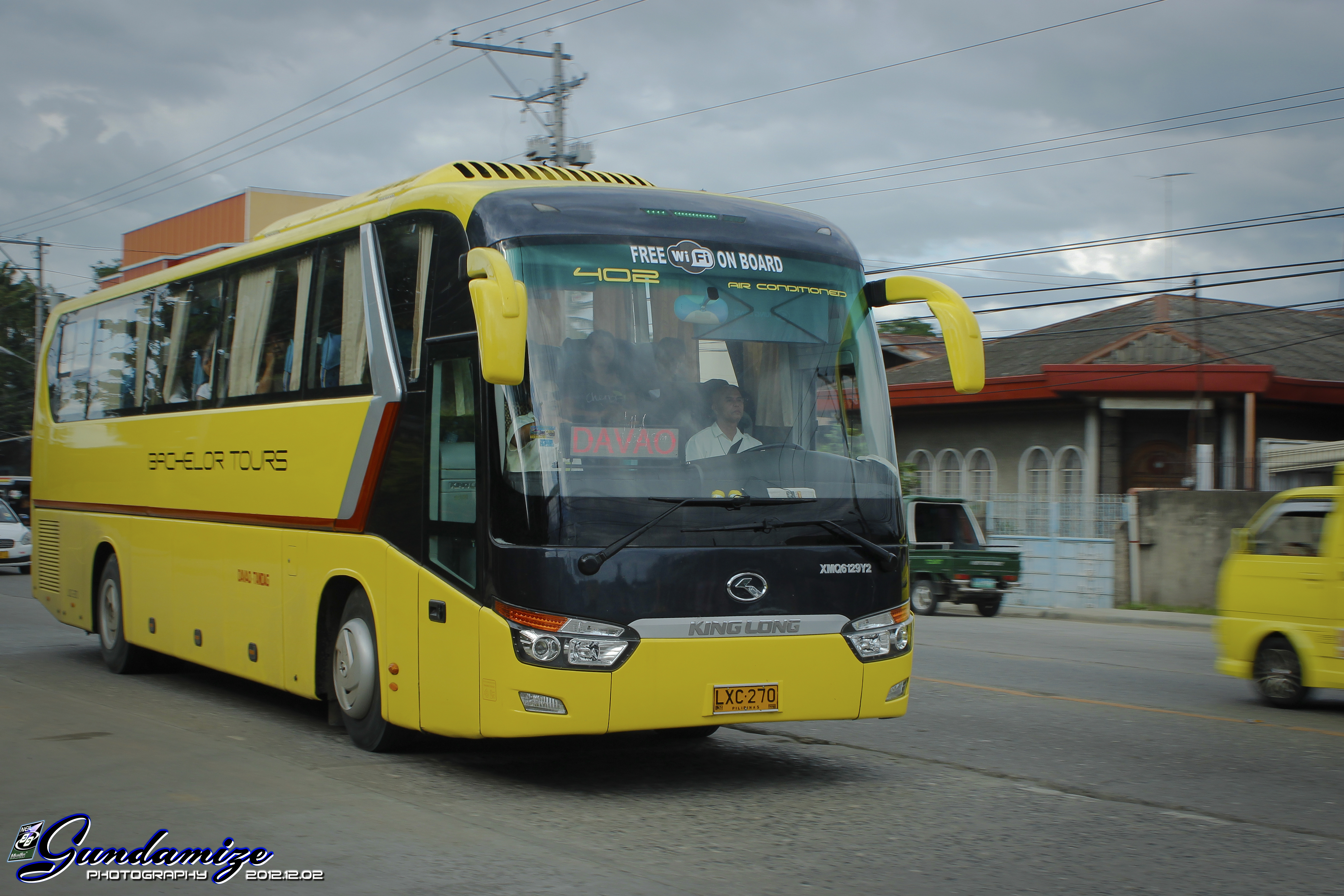
A KingLong "Longwei" bus unit of Bachelor Express, a subsidiary of Yanson Group of Bus Companies

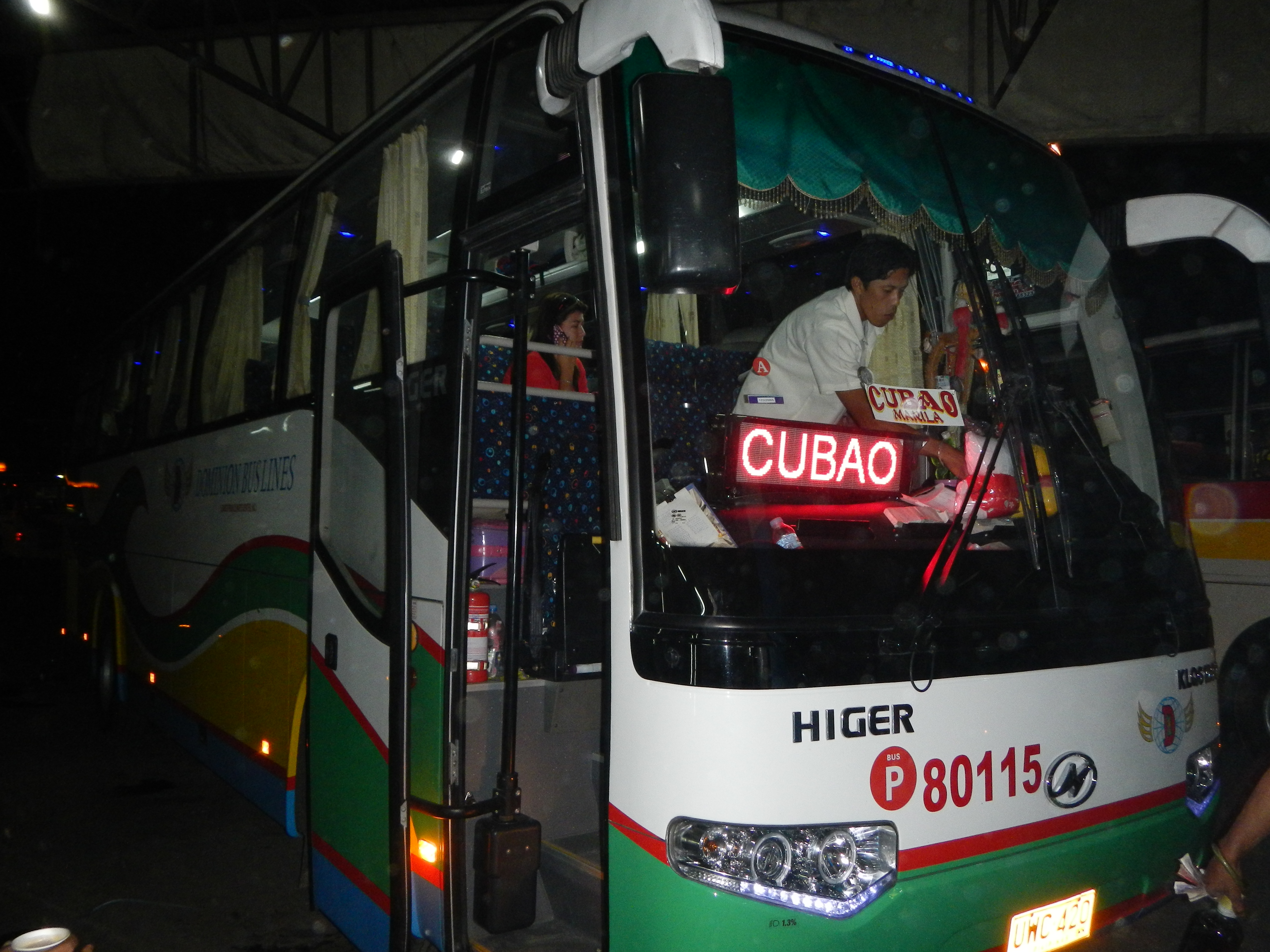
A Dominion Bus Lines bus at night

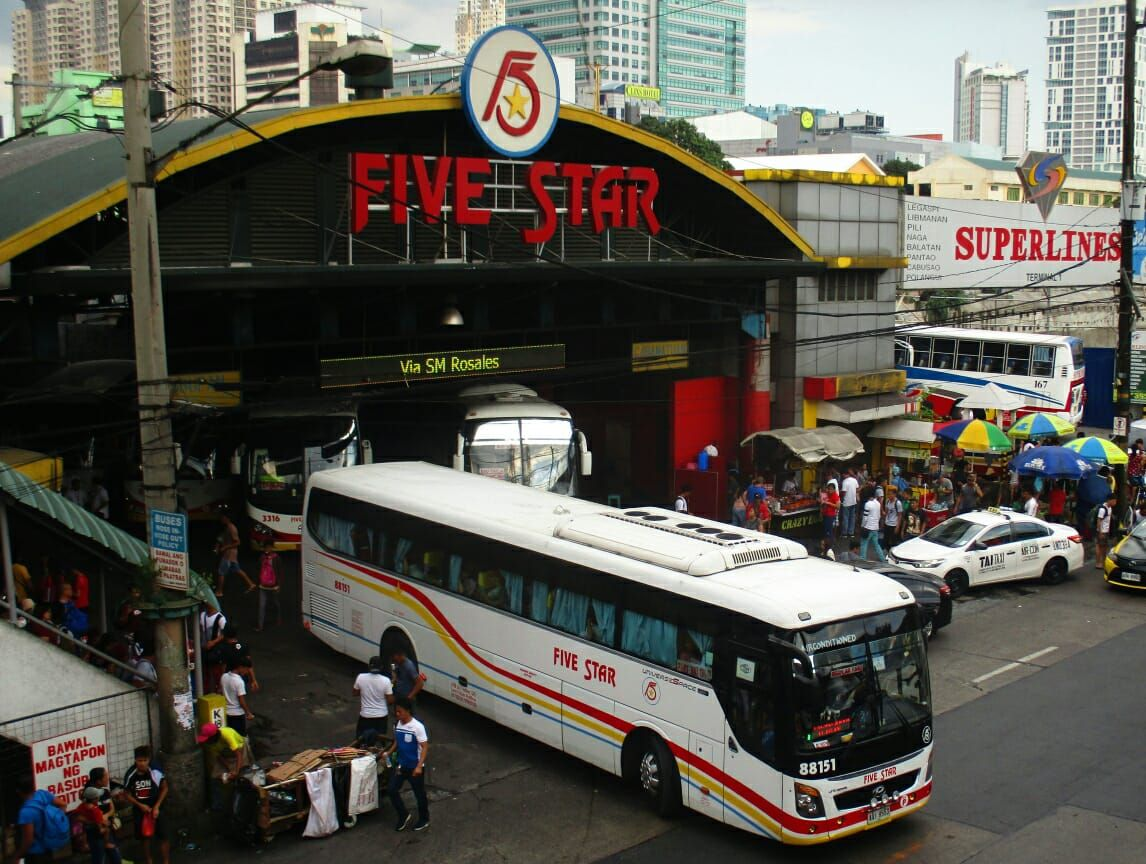
Five Star Bus in Cubao EDSA Quezon City

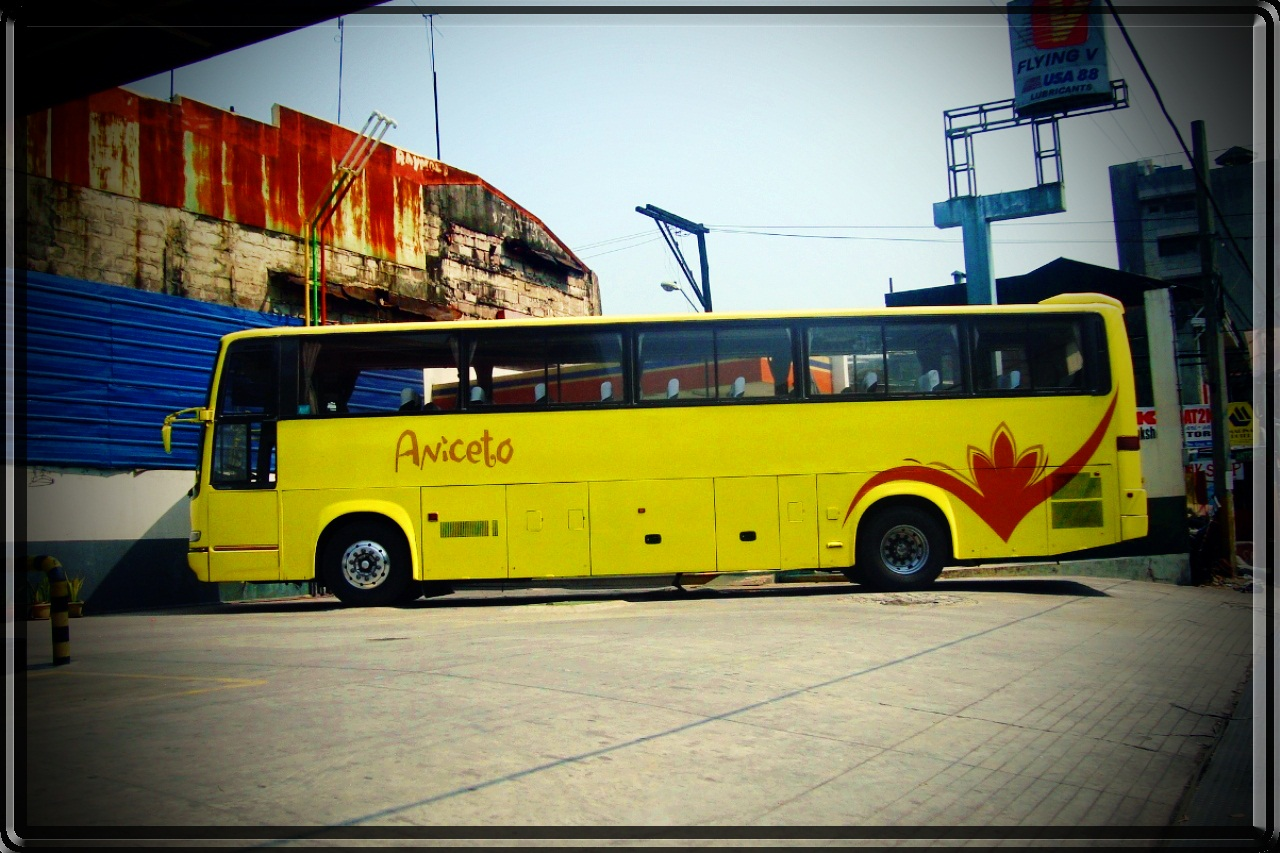
An Inocencio Aniceto Transportation bus

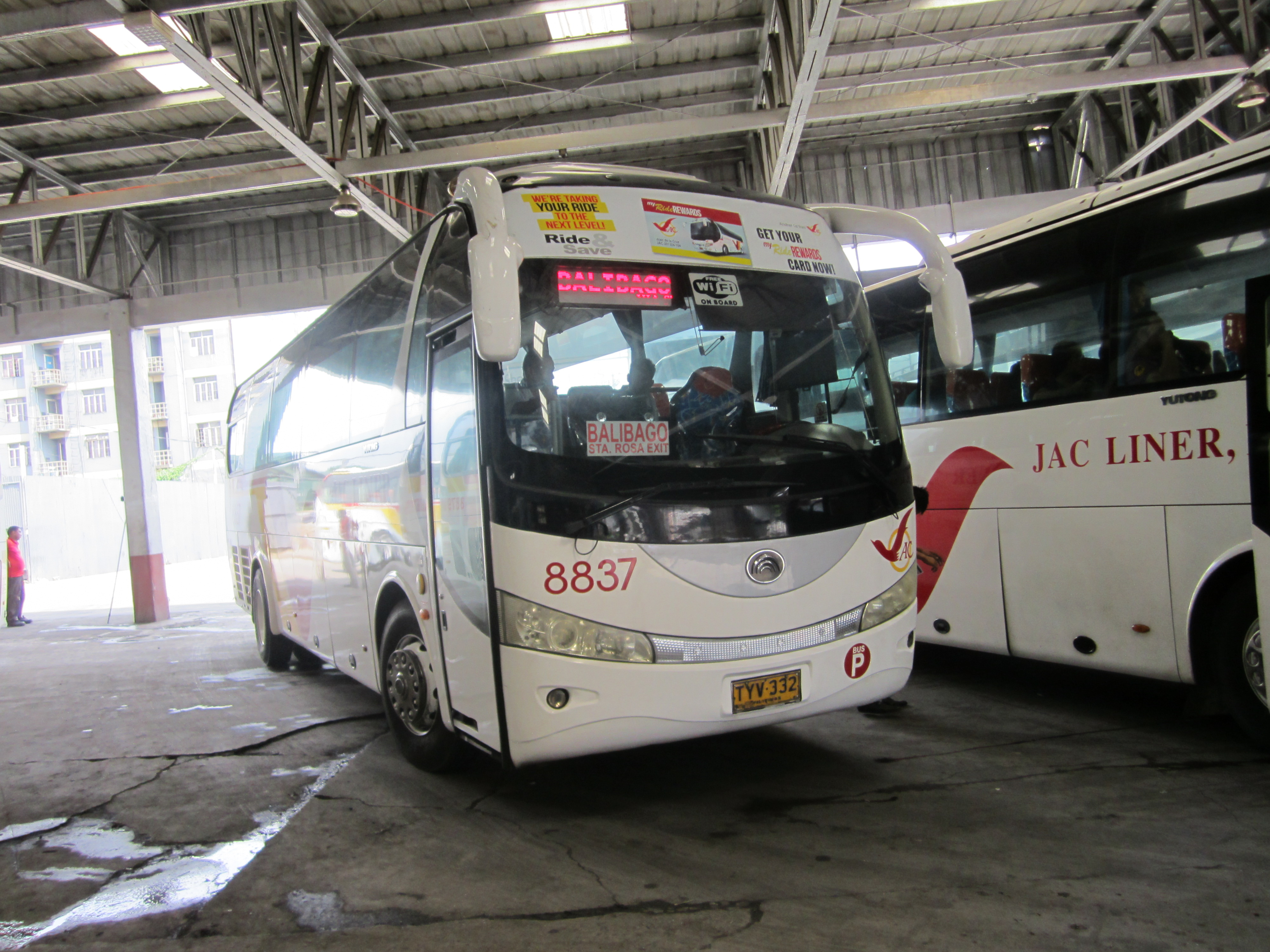
A JAC Liner Inc. Yutong ZK6100H bus in EDSA Kamias Terminal

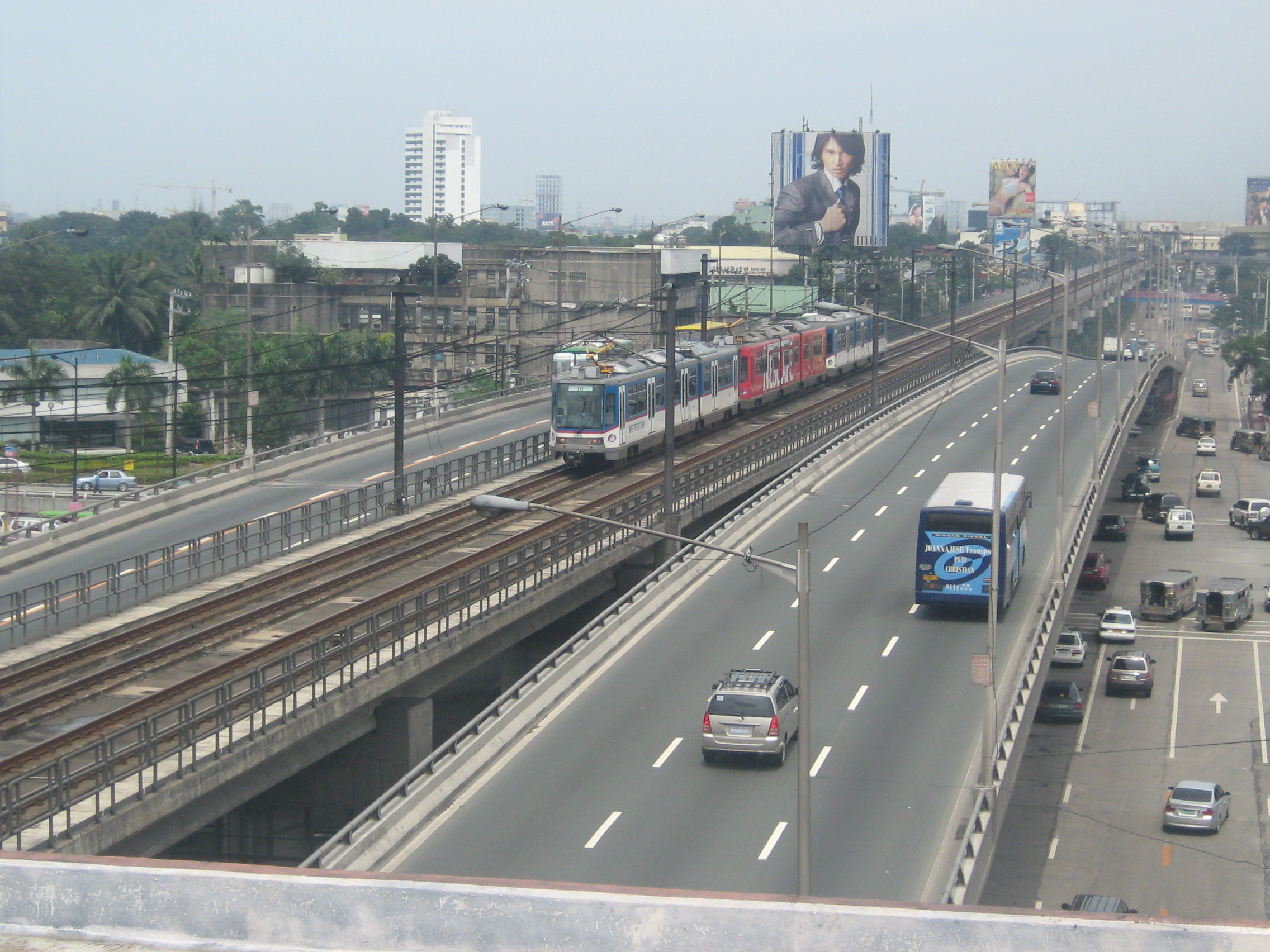
A Joanna Jesh Transport bus unit between the EDSA-Quezon Avenue Flyover

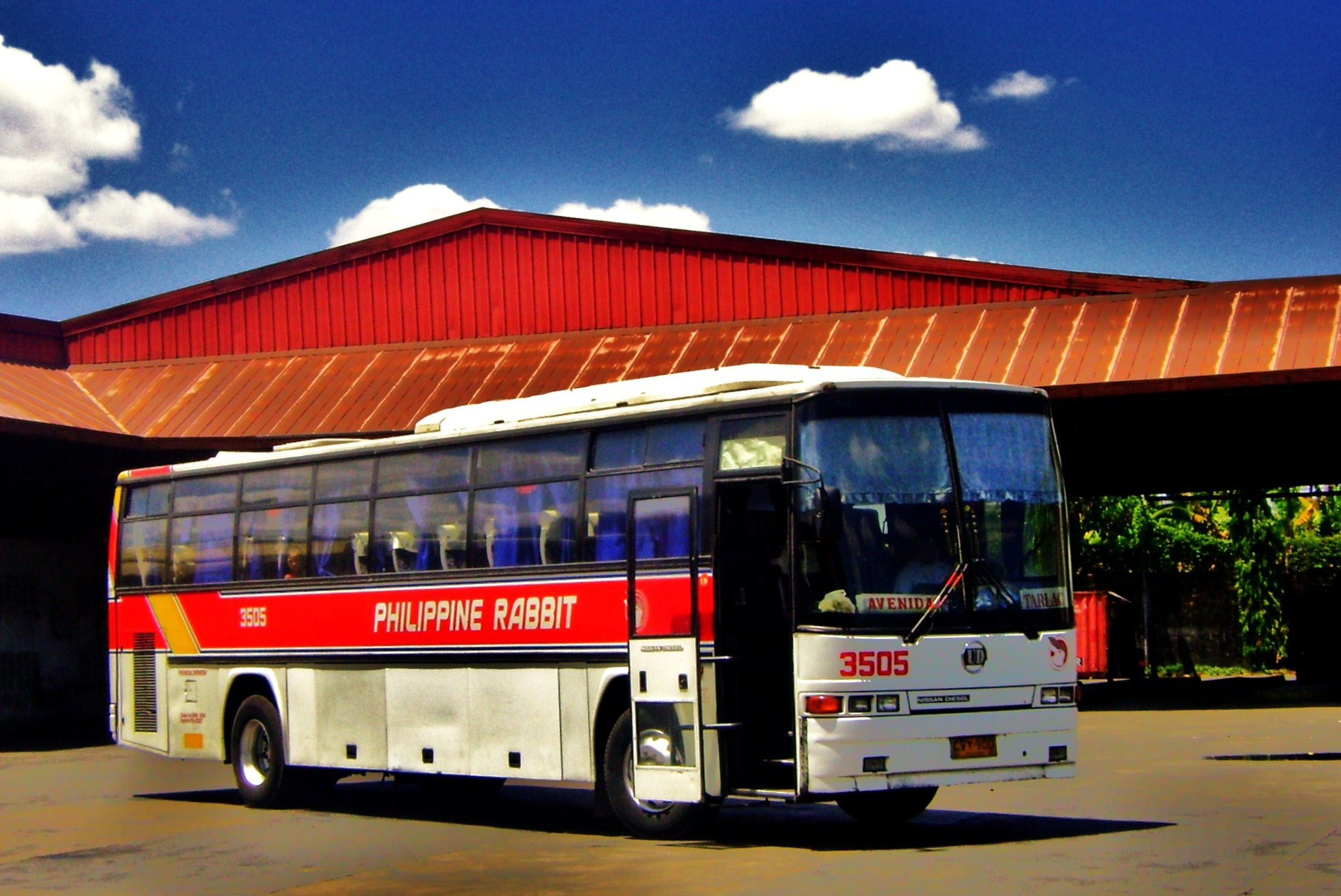
A Philippine Rabbit bus

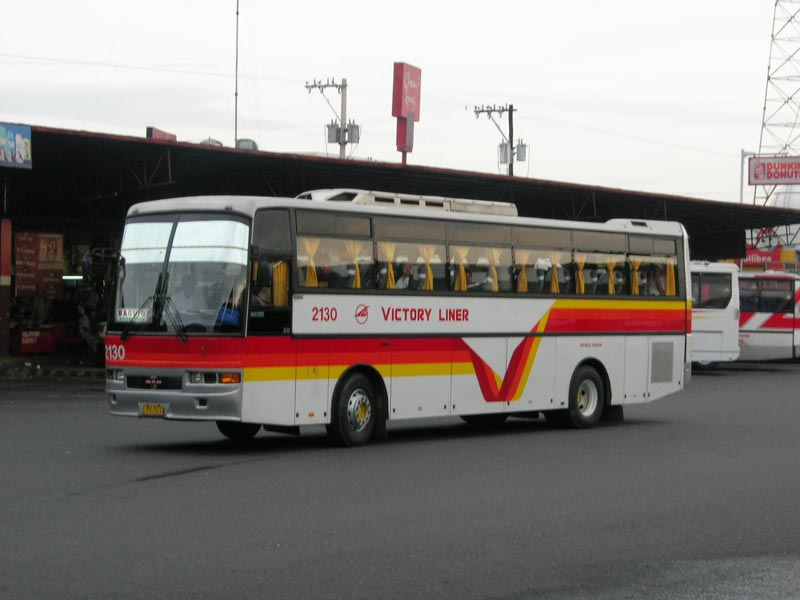
A Victory Liner MAN 18.310 DMMC Lion's Star

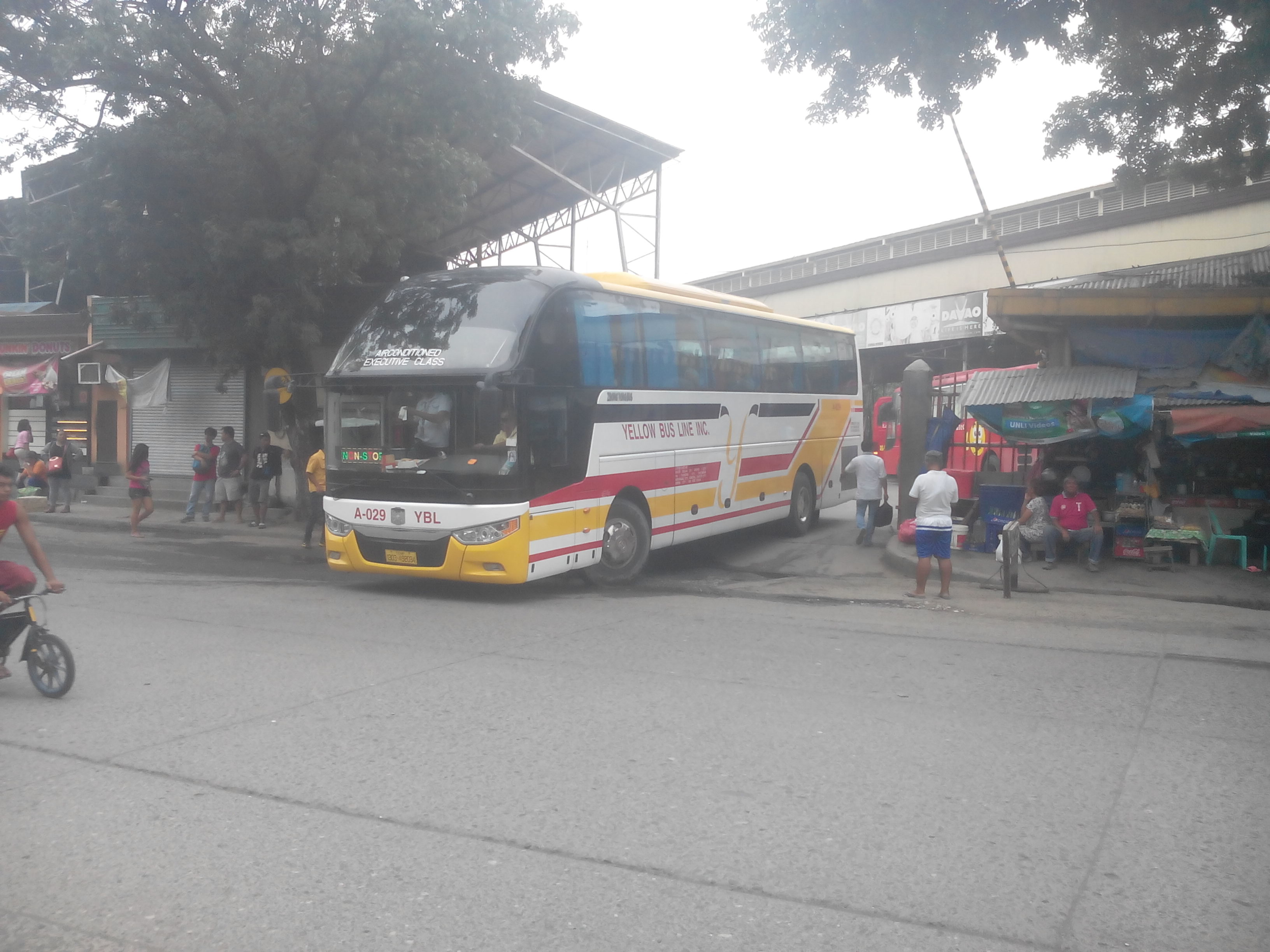
A Yellow Bus Line Zhongtong LCK6128H bus in Davao City Overland Transport Terminal, bound to General Santos

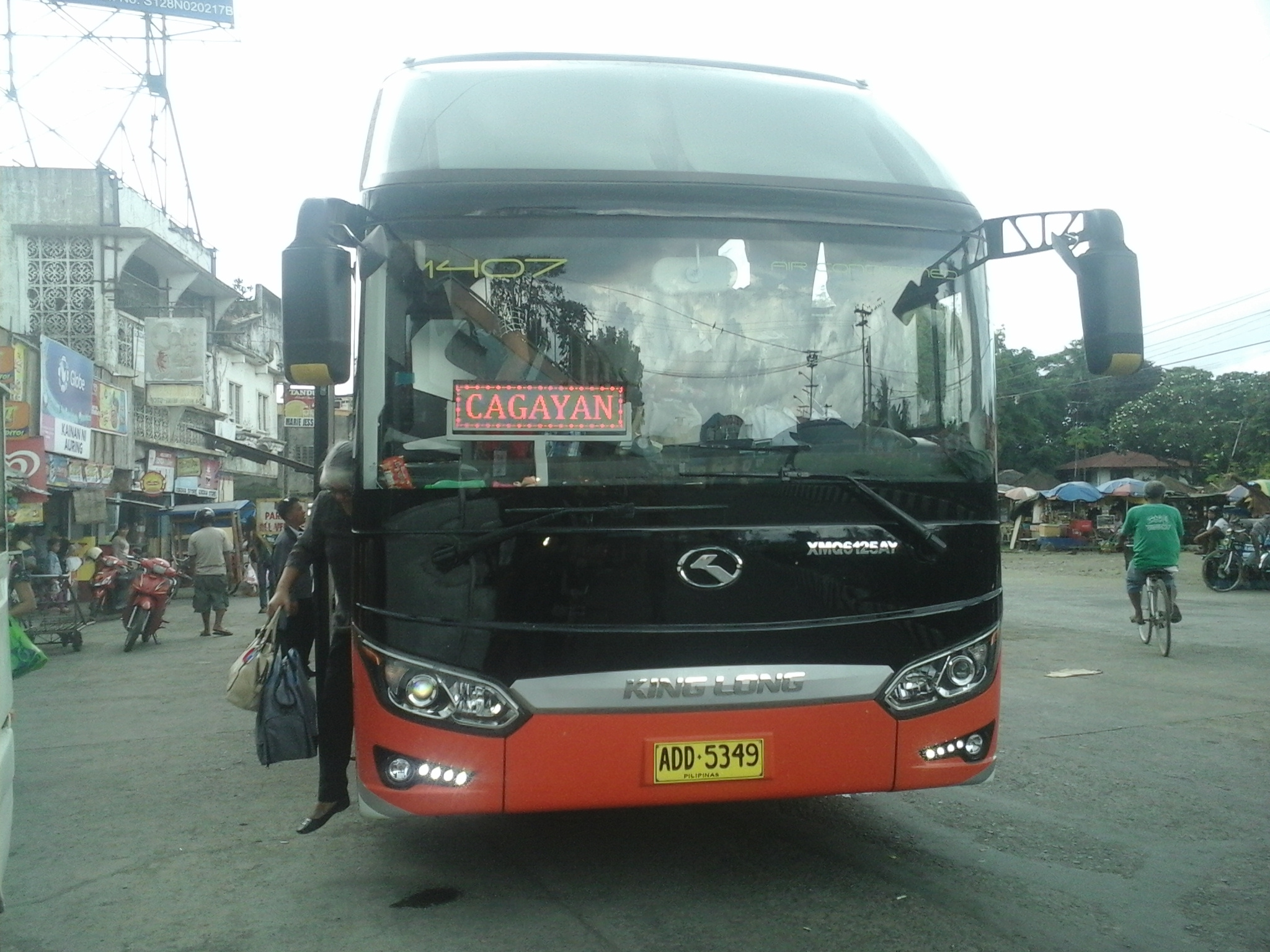
Rural Tours 1407 King Long XMQ6125Y5 bound for Cagayan de Oro City.

== See also ==
- Taxicabs of the Philippines
- Transportation in the Philippines
