= JMT =

JMT may refer to:

- JMT Records, a German record label
- Jedi Mind Tricks, an American hip hop group
- Jesus myth theory
- John Michael Talbot (born 1954), an American musician
- John Muir Trail, in California
- John Muir Trust, a Scottish charitable company
- Journal of Music Theory
- Juaymah Maureen Transport, a Filipino bus company
- Tianjin Jinmen Tiger F.C., a Chinese football club
- Jerónimo Martins, a Portuguese retail company with stock symbol JMT
- Johnson, Mirmiran & Thompson, a large, US-based engineering and architecture firm
