= Jayross Lucky Seven Tours =

City bus company in the Philippines

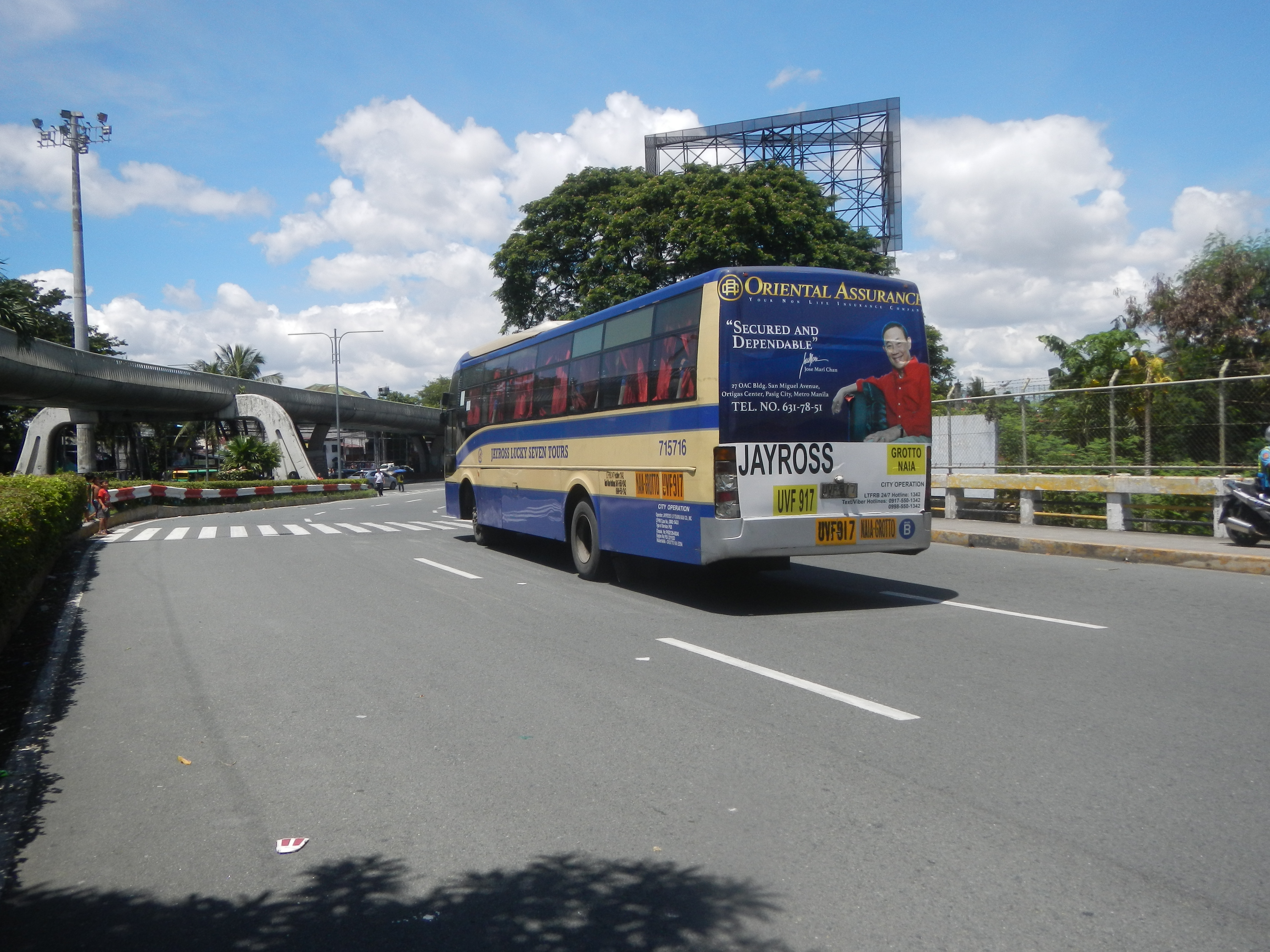
- Jayross Lucky Seven Tours travelling along the NAIA Road in Pasay
- Founded: 1998
- Ceased operation: 2026 (unverified)
- Headquarters: San Jose del Monte, Bulacan
- Service area: Bulacan; Metro Manila; Rizal
- Service type: City operation
- Routes: Antipolo; Baclaran; PITX; Fairview
- Operator: Jayross Lucky Seven Tours Co. Inc.

Jayross Lucky Seven Tours Co. Inc. (JLST) is a Philippine bus company operating in Metro Manila, primarily known for serving Route 7 (Fairview–PITX via Quezon Avenue/EDSA).

== History ==
Jayross Lucky Seven Tours began operations in 1998 in San Jose del Monte, Bulacan, initially operating Japanese surplus bus units. In 2005, the company transitioned to brand-new buses supplied by Columbian Motors Corporation and Hino Motors Philippines.

In February 2026, reports circulated online claiming that the company had ceased operations. Although the claim is not independently verified, observers like bus spotters noted that Jayross buses had largely disappeared from their usual routes by February 2026.

== Issues and criticisms ==
In February 2009, Jayross Lucky Seven Tours denied allegations that it was operating outside its authorized routes, stating that it held valid permits from the Land Transportation Franchising and Regulatory Board (LTFRB) to operate the NAIA–Tungko via EDSA route. The company described reports of out-of-line operations and claims of financial losses raised by a rival bus operators' group as unfounded and motivated by business competition. Jayross maintained that revenue declines affecting bus operators at the time were due to rising fuel prices, the global economic crisis, and other industry-wide challenges, adding that the matter had been brought before the courts for resolution.

In April 2010, three persons were killed and 58 others were injured when a Jayross Lucky Seven Tours bus accidentally hit a tree along Governor Linao road in Barangay Binukawan, Bagac, Bataan. According to report, the victims were relatives of bus inspectors and other company employees.

In March 2011, the Land Transportation Franchising and Regulatory Board (LTFRB) suspended four bus companies, including Jayross Lucky Seven Tours, for allegedly participating in a bus strike that disrupted Metro Manila commuters in November 2010. Jayross, Laguna Star Bus Transportation System, and Angelito Chang Bus Line had their Certificates of Public Convenience (CPC) suspended for six months, while JRMS Golden Sky Transport Inc. received a three-month suspension. The LTFRB stated that public utility operators are obligated to provide adequate service and ruled that the companies failed to justify their participation in the strike.

In December 2012, at least 19 people were injured in a traffic accident along Commonwealth Avenue in Quezon City when a bus driven by a Prado bus driver lost its brakes and collided with the rear of a stationary Jayross Lucky Seven Tours bus. The injured passengers, including a 12‑year‑old girl, were rushed to East Avenue Medical Center, and authorities responded to the crash.

In April 2014, the Metropolitan Manila Development Authority (MMDA) suspended BNW Towing Services for three months following a complaint filed by Jayross Lucky Seven Tours Bus Co. Inc., after one of its stalled buses sustained roof damage while being towed along Kamias Road in Quezon City. The bus company alleged that the tow truck driver miscalculated the height clearance of a flyover, causing the vehicle to hit the underside of the bridge.

In April 2016, ten passengers of a Jayross Lucky Seven Tours bus were hospitalized after being exposed to fumes from a chemical leak while traveling along Commonwealth Avenue in Quezon City. The odor, later identified as oxalic acid from a passenger's bleaching agent, caused discomfort to the driver and passengers, who had to break windows to ventilate the bus. The company did not press charges against the passenger, and the bus was turned over to local authorities for investigation.

== Labor dispute ==
In October 2025, employees of Jayross Lucky Seven Tours raised complaints regarding unpaid monetary claims allegedly dating back to the COVID-19 pandemic. According to officials of the National Labor Relations Commission (NLRC), the case involved a revival of judgment after an earlier settlement between the complainants and the company was declared null and void due to irregularities in the agreement. Executive Labor Arbiter Eric Almeyda of the NLRC Regional Arbitration Branch III stated that the settlement had been invalidated after findings that the complainants’ consent may have been vitiated. Following the revival of the earlier decision, the judgment award was recomputed, with the total amount reportedly reaching more than ₱24 million. A writ of execution was subsequently issued to enforce the ruling.

Authorities later confirmed that around 129 buses of the company had been placed under alarm in the records of the Land Transportation Office (LTO) as part of enforcement procedures. According to LTO Traffic Adjudication Service Director Wendel Dinglasan, the annotation was intended to prevent the transfer or disposal of the vehicles while the judgment was being implemented. The NLRC stated that if the company failed to satisfy the judgment award, the buses could be subject to levy and public auction to cover the monetary claims of the complainants.

== Routes ==
Jayross Lucky Seven Tours operates routes from the provinces of Rizal and Bulacan to Metro Manila. The company currently operates two active rationalized Metro Manila routes: SM Fairview–PITX and Antipolo–Cubao.

=== Active routes ===
- Antipolo, Rizal to Cubao, Quezon City / Quiapo
- SM Fairview to PITX

=== Inactive routes ===
- Alabang, Muntinlupa to SM Fairview
- Baclaran to SM Fairview via Lagro
- Cubao to Doroteo Jose station, Manila
- NAIA to Grotto via EDSA, Baclaran
