= Greenline Express =

Bus company in the Philippines

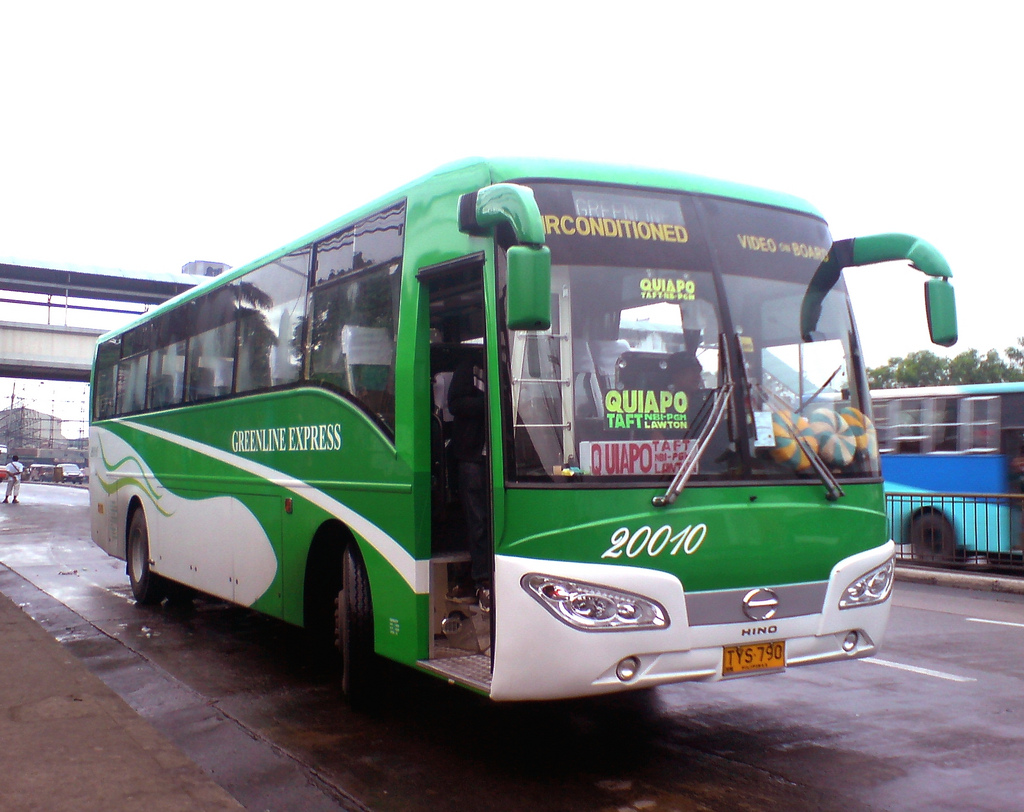
- Founded: 2008; 18 years ago
- Headquarters: West Fairview, Quezon City, Philippines
- Service area: SM Fairview-PITX via Quezon Avenue
- Service type: City Operation
- Fleet: 15 buses Hino Motors, Hyundai, UD Trucks (formerly, Nissan Diesel), Isuzu
- Operator: Greenline Express

Greenline Express is a city bus company in the Philippines, plying the route SM Fairview-PITX via Taft Ave. and Quezon Ave. Their office is located at Fairview, Quezon City.

== History ==
The company was formed by the remnants of Northzone Transport, one of the pioneer bus companies plying the route. They slowly replaced their aging Japanese City Buses, first by acquiring brand new Hino RK1JMT buses, and after that using Isuzu buses. Recently, they acquired a fleet of Hyundai Aero City and Hyundai Aero to augment their existing fleet.

== Fleet ==
Greenline Express utilizes and maintains a total of 15 buses, of which the present units are the following:

- Hino RK1JMT
- Isuzu LV314 (Isuzu Cubic)
- Hyundai Aero City
- Nissan Diesel CPB87N
- Hyundai Aero
- UD Trucks PKB212N (1 units only)

The following are the former units under its former name Northzone Transport.

- Nissan Diesel UA (U32L)
- Mitsubishi Fuso MP
- Isuzu Cubic

== Gallery ==
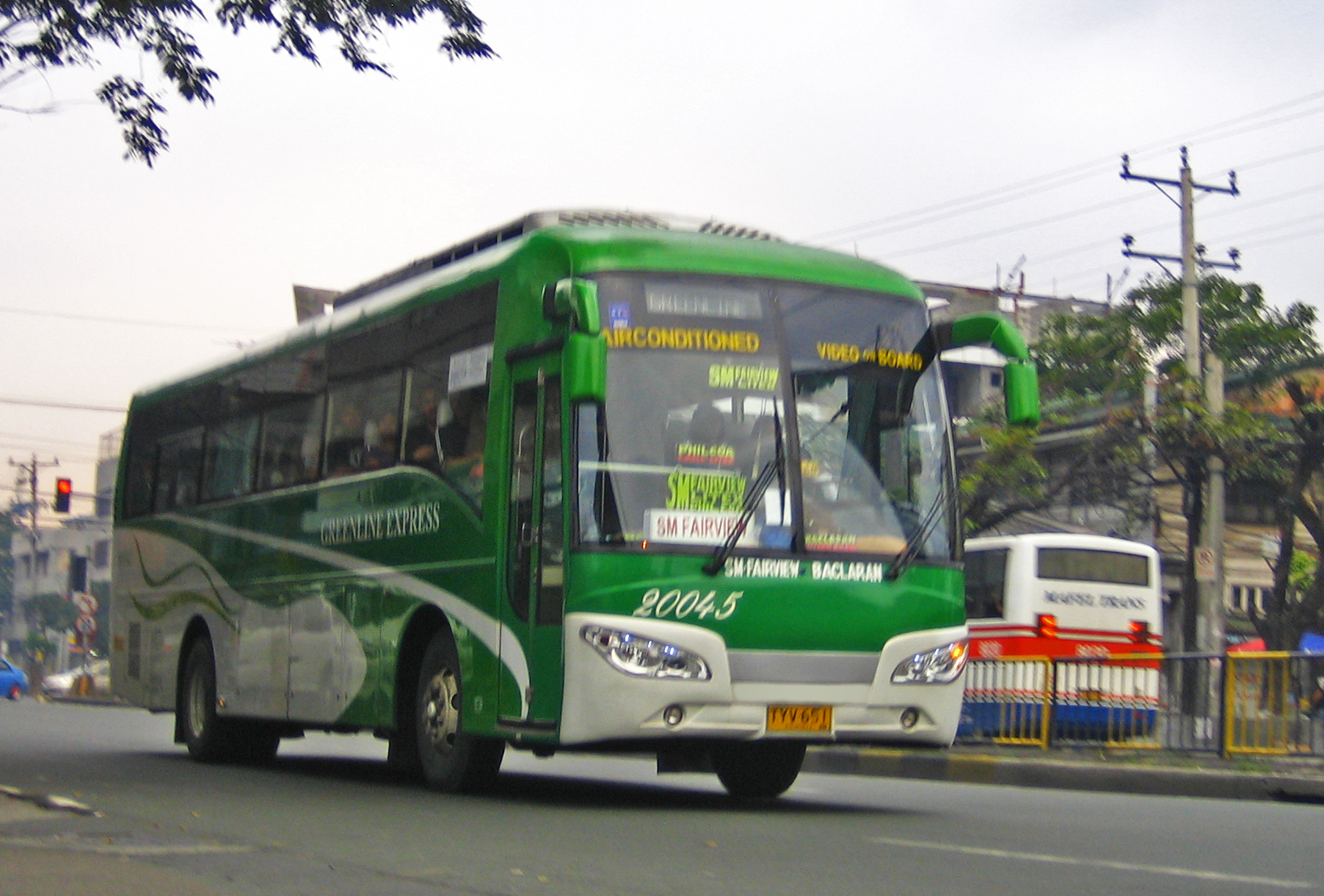
Fleet No. 20045, Hyundai Aero City

== See also ==
- List of bus companies of the Philippines
