= D' Biel Transportation Company =

Bus company in the Philippines

- Logo

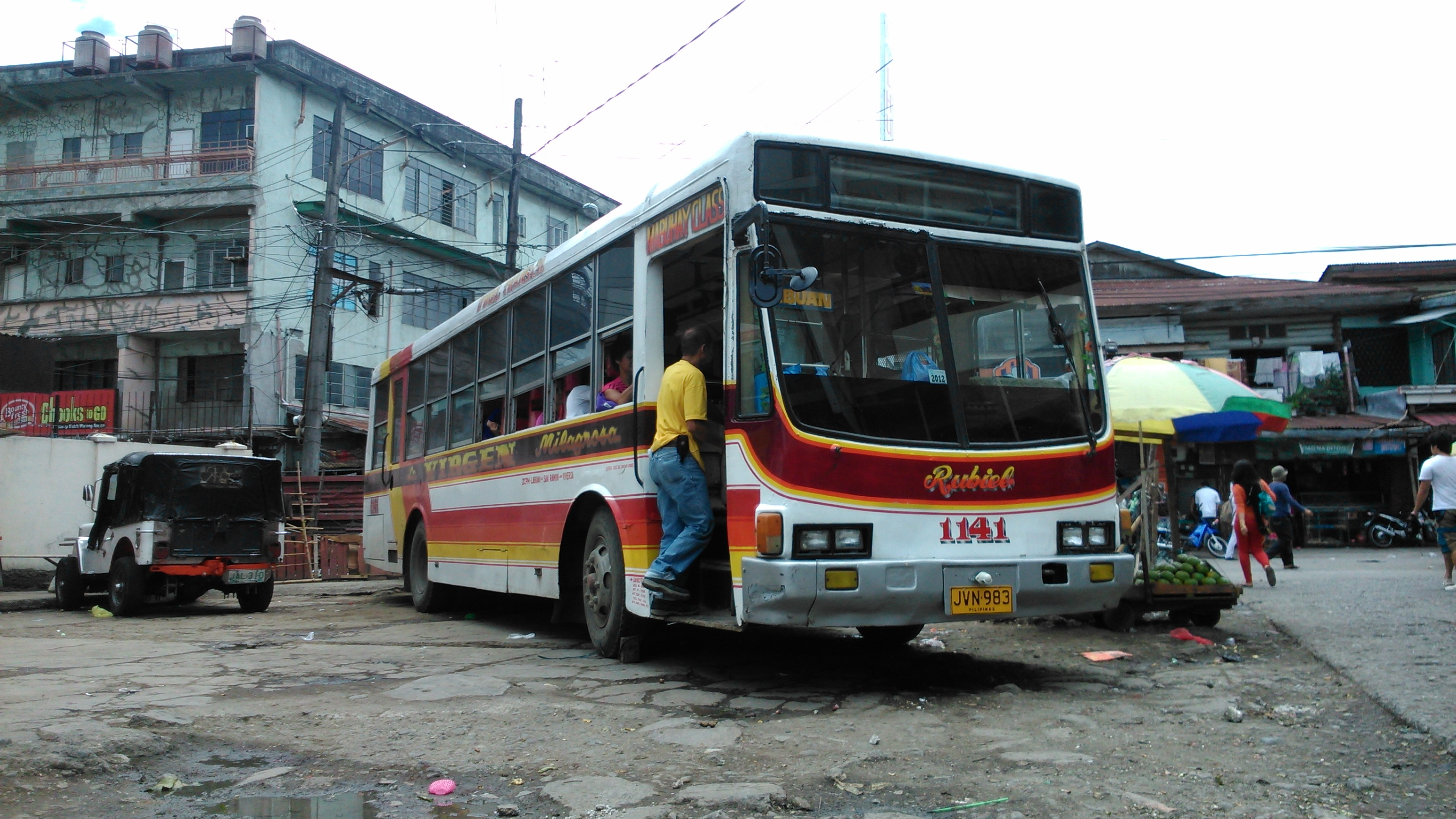
- A D' Biel bus embarking passengers at the D' Biel Bus Terminal in Magay St., Zamboanga City.
- Industry: Land Transport
- Founder: Luis Biel II
- Headquarters: San Jose Road, Baliwasan, Zamboanga City, Philippines
- Area served: Zamboanga City, Basilan
- Key people: Luis Biel III, Luis Biel IV (Owner)
- Services: Shuttle; Inter-City; Tourist

D' Biel Transportation Company is a bus company operated in Zamboanga City and Basilan province. It is a family business currently spearheaded by the Zamboanga City Lone District Councilor, Luis Biel III with a fleet of at least 50 buses and UV Express Service.

== History ==
=== Late 1990s to 2006 ===
D' Biel Transportation Company is a family business of both Rubio and Biel Family who are known in local politics along Zamboanga City and Basilan Province. Initiated by the late Isabela City Mayor, Luis Rubio Biel II in the late 1990s. it started with at least 5 Isuzu Journey surplus buses from Japan, around 10 Isuzu Forward trucks that are remodified into buses, and to at least 5 to 10 Isuzu Elf trucks which are modified into jeepneys. They initially serve the Zamboanga City's downtown (Zamboanga City Public Market / ZCPM) to Barangay Labuan in Zamboanga City and an inter-connecting route from Isabela City, Basilan to Lamitan City, Basilan.

Their buses are well known by its iconic livery with the name "La Virgen Milagrosa" (Chavacano: The Miraculous Virgin), which depicts to the patron saint of Zamboanga City, The Our Lady of Pilar, and the "Rubiel" text in the front which is a short term for their family name "Rubio" and "Biel".

With their family came as the prominent politicians along the areas which D' Biel Transportation is serving, Luis Rubio Biel II constructed a bus terminal along Isabela City which is today's Isabela City West Terminal.

In year 2000, the company offers rent-a-car service such as bridal car and public utility vans. Once started with a Nissan Sentra, it grew with Honda Civic, and to at least five Nissan Urvan and Toyota Hiace van units.

With their business continuously growing and as they gained popularity in politics, it lures some terrorist group to extort their family and their business. Several threats were made against Luis Rubio Biel II. But it didn't stop him to pursue his leadership for Isabela City. Branded as the "Father of Isabela City", a Subanon Tribal Council noted how Biel II “proudly promoted the new city as a tourism destination mainly for its people’s rich and unique cultural diversity.” In his eight years in public service since his first election in 1998, Biel II built a city hospital, government complex, public markets, two bus terminals, schools, day care and feeding centers for children, multi-purpose and barangay halls, roads for farmers, cultural centers for his Muslim constituents as well as Christians, health units, and many more.

However, on March 3, 2006 Biel II was shot dead inside the City Hall by the lone attacker Javer Gani. Gani was then killed by security forces, but four other people were wounded in the cross-fire. The management took place by his son, Luis Biel III.

=== 2006 to present ===
Luis Biel III started his political career in Zamboanga City as a city councilor since 2007, while Luis Biel VI continued the legacy of his father in Isabela City.

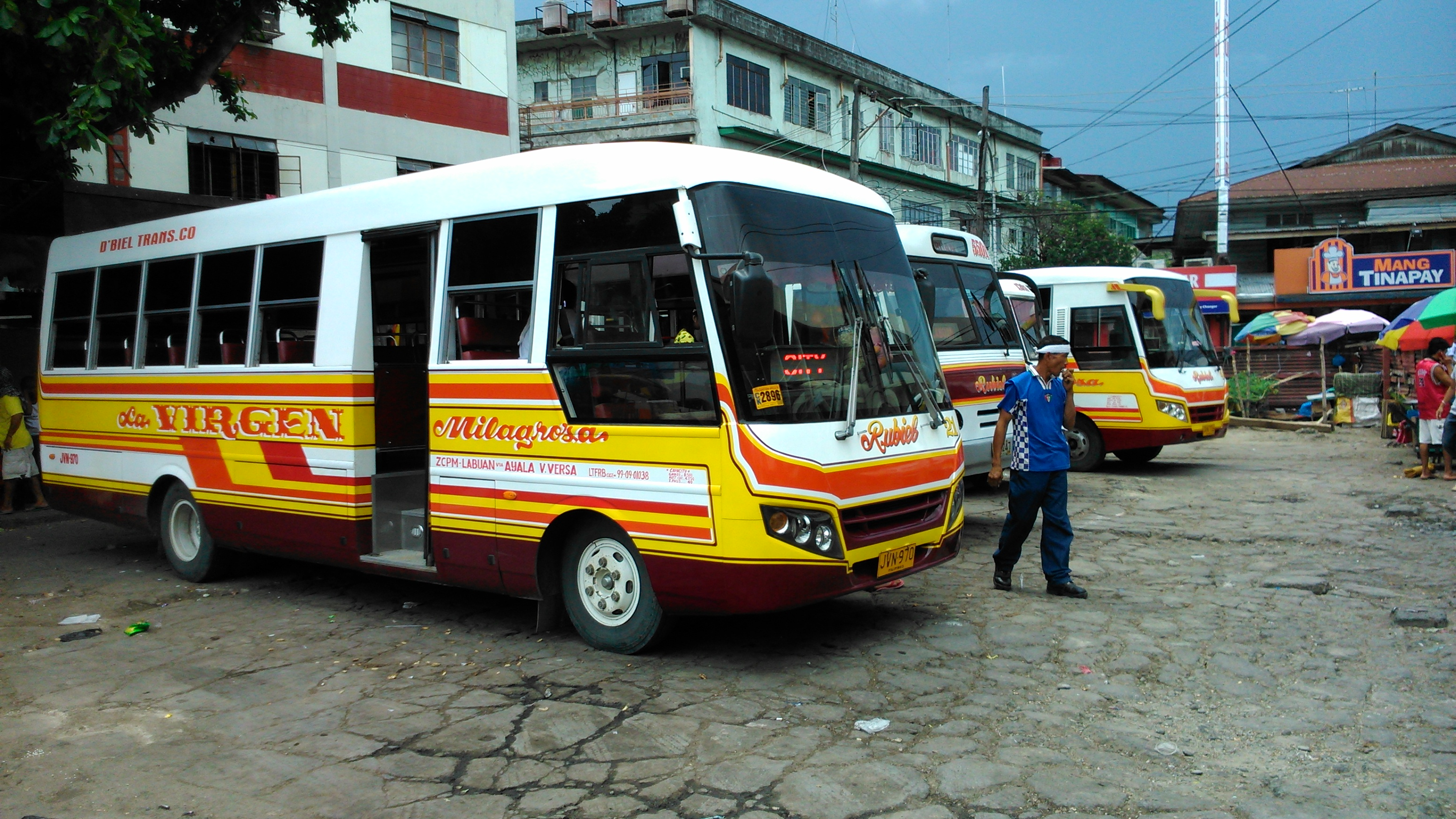
D' Biel Terminal in Magay St., corner Tomas Claudio St., Zamboanga City

By that time, their buses are starting to get old and are in need of heavy maintenance. By then, the bus company grew up with a coachbuilding division at their headquarters in order to cater their needs. Later on, they imported additional Isuzu Forward trucks which later converted into buses. Several imports were made from Pilipinas Hino Motors Inc., around another 5 Isuzu Journey buses imported from Japan, and a sum of Toyota Coasters. The fleet size grew from around 50 to now at least at least a hundred units. In 2014, they modernized their fleets with additional units from Almazora Motors Corporation. It also added with several Hyundai County buses for their Tourist services.

In the same year, D' Biel added a new route for Zamboanga City downtown (ZCPM) to Barangay Sangali.

Up until today, no other bus company managed to compete with D' Biel services. Still, they are the lone bus operator in Basilan Province and the lone bus operator to serve the inter-city bus services for Zamboanga City. Meanwhile, his sons are also active in politics and their company still receives extortions from terrorist groups demanding money from their company such as the Abu Sayyaf Group.

== Fleet ==
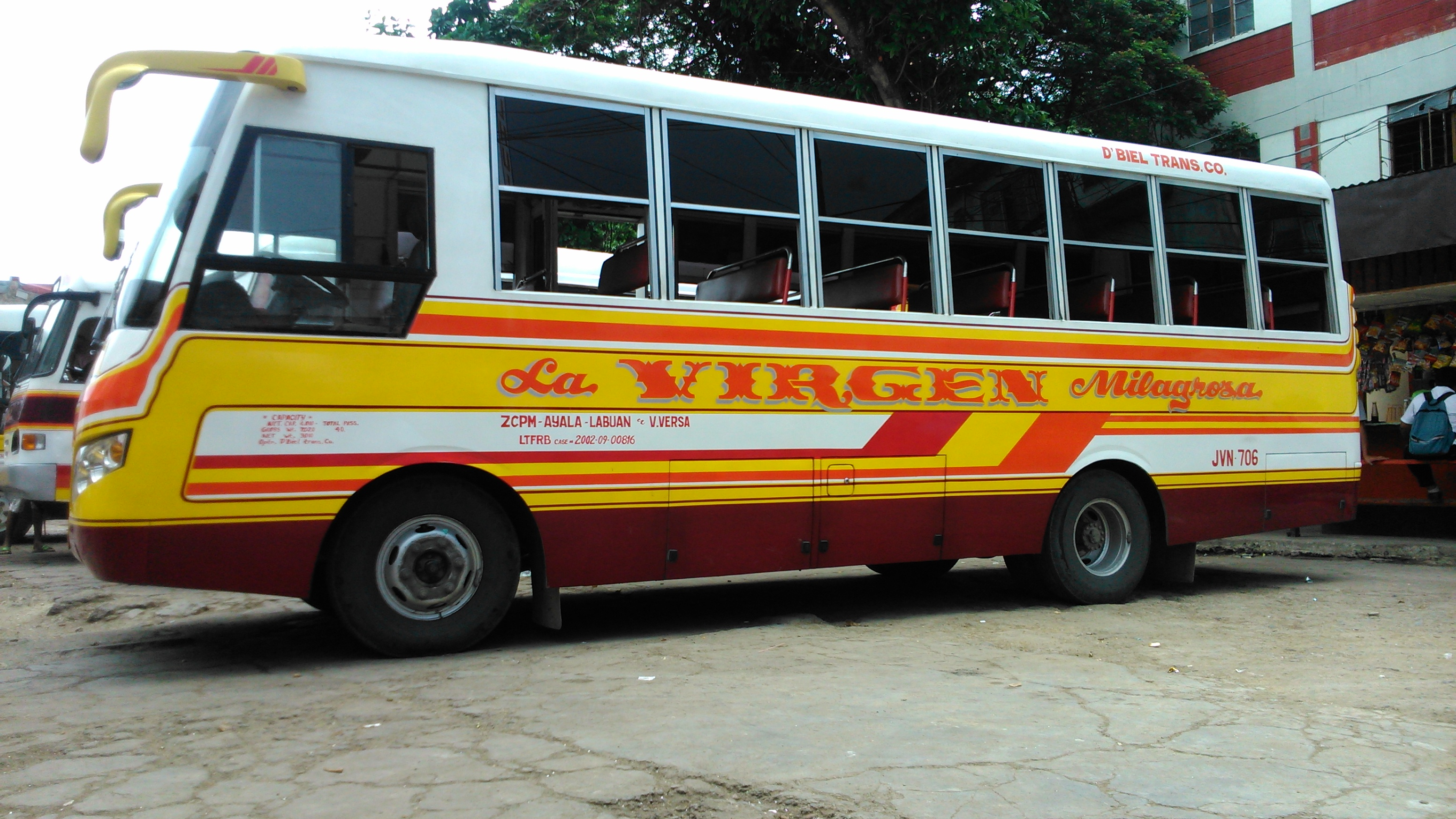
D' Biel 41, a prototype from Almazora Motors' Isuzu NQR Minibus which is made by D' Biel's coach building division

These are their bus units as of 2016:

- Isuzu Journey (Airconary)
- Isuzu Journey (Ordinary Fare)
- Isuzu Forward (remodified into a bus)
- Isuzu Elf (remodified into a bus)
- Isuzu NQR Almazora Minibus
- Isuzu NQR Minibus - D' Biel Prototype
- Hyundai County
- Hino RF (body by Pilipinas-Hino Motors Inc.)

They also serve a rent-a-car service with these following fleet:

- Honda Civic
- Toyota Hiace D4D
- Nissan Urvan

== Routes ==
- Isabela City - Lamitan City
- Zamboanga City Public Market - Labuan (inter-city transport)
- Zamboanga City Public Market - Sangali (inter-city transport)

== Bus Terminals ==
- Magay Terminal, Magay St., corner Tomas Claudio St., Zamboanga City
- Labuan, Zamboanga City
- San Jose Road., Baliwasan, Zamboanga City (D' Biel Headquarters)
- Isabela City West Terminal (Operated also by the Isabela City LGU)
- Lamitan City Integrated Bus Terminal (Operated also by the Lamitan City LGU)

== Notable incidents ==
Most of their incidents were due to extortions.

- On September 20, 2013, at least three people were reported killed while one was injured after an improvised explosive device (IED) blasted a passenger bus in Zamboanga City. Chief Insp. Ariel Huesca, Zamboanga peninsula regional police spokesman, said the IED exploded at a "Biel Transit" bus number 2871 with a plate number JAW 651. The bus was parked at the bus storage in Barangay Labuan, a coastal village 35 kilometers from the city proper.
- On September 18, 2015, a young girl was killed while several others were injured in an explosion at a bus terminal in a public market in Tomas Claudio Street, Zamboanga City. Sources from the Philippine National Police (PNP) said the bus, which came from Barangay Labuan, had just arrived at the terminal when an unidentified passenger left a plastic bag inside the bus' trash bin. Suspecting something, the bus conductor took the plastic to move it to another area. This prompted the explosion.

== See also ==
- Yellow Bus Line
- Aleson Shipping Lines
- Ever Shipping Lines
