= Citylink Coach Services =

Intercity bus company

Citylink Coach Services Inc.
- Founded: 2008; 18 years ago
- Headquarters: McKinley Hill, Taguig
- Service area: Metro Manila
- Service type: City Operation, Shuttle Service
- Routes: Eastwood—Newport City (via C-5 East Service Road); Ayala Center—Market! Market! (via BGC); McKinley Hill; Chino Roces Avenue (Pasong Tamo)
- Fleet: 20 buses (Hino, King Long, Higer, Daewoo)
- Operator: Citylink Coach Services Inc. (operated under First Oceanic Property Management Inc.)

Citylink Coach Services Inc. is an intercity bus company in the Philippines operated under First Oceanic Property Management Inc., an affiliate company of Megaworld Corporation. It plies routes from Eastwood City, in Libis, Quezon City to Newport City, in Villamor Air Base, Pasay via C-5 Road, making the first bus company to traverse along the said road. This company offers shuttle services only for those who are working to the companies operated under Megaworld Corporation.

Like Bonifacio Transport Corp., this bus company is also one of the authorized non-EDSA Metro Manila buses in the National Capital Region that traverses from one business district to another.

== History ==
Citylink Coach Services Inc. was established through its investment of P100 million by the First Oceanic Property Management, Inc., an affiliate company of Megaworld Corporation. The route Eastwood City-Newport City via C-5 Road was approved by the Land Transportation Franchising and Regulatory Board (Philippines), a government agency under Department of Transportation and Communications last March 6, 2008 and the company operates using five buses—1 Hino, 1 Higer, and 3 King Long units. Later, the buses were increased to 15 and were used as shuttle service when Citylink has been invested by First Oceanic to boost the need for the employees working in the companies under Megaworld Corporation, its subsidiaries, and many multinational companies occupying at the business districts like Eastwood City, Newport City, Bonifacio Global City, McKinley Hill, and Ayala Center.

== Fleet ==
Citylink utilizes Hino, King Long, Higer, and Daewoo units, preferably air-conditioned, totalling about 20 buses. Five of those first units were used for city operation, while the rest are used as shuttle services going to Ayala Center in Makati, McKinley Hill and Bonifacio Global City in Taguig, and Eastwood City in Libis, Quezon City.

Units

Higer

- KLQ6109E3 V90 (2 Units Ad-wrapped)

Hino Philippines

- RK1JST

Hyundai

- Hyundai County (No Livery)

GET

- COMET (No Livery)

King Long

- XMQ6119T

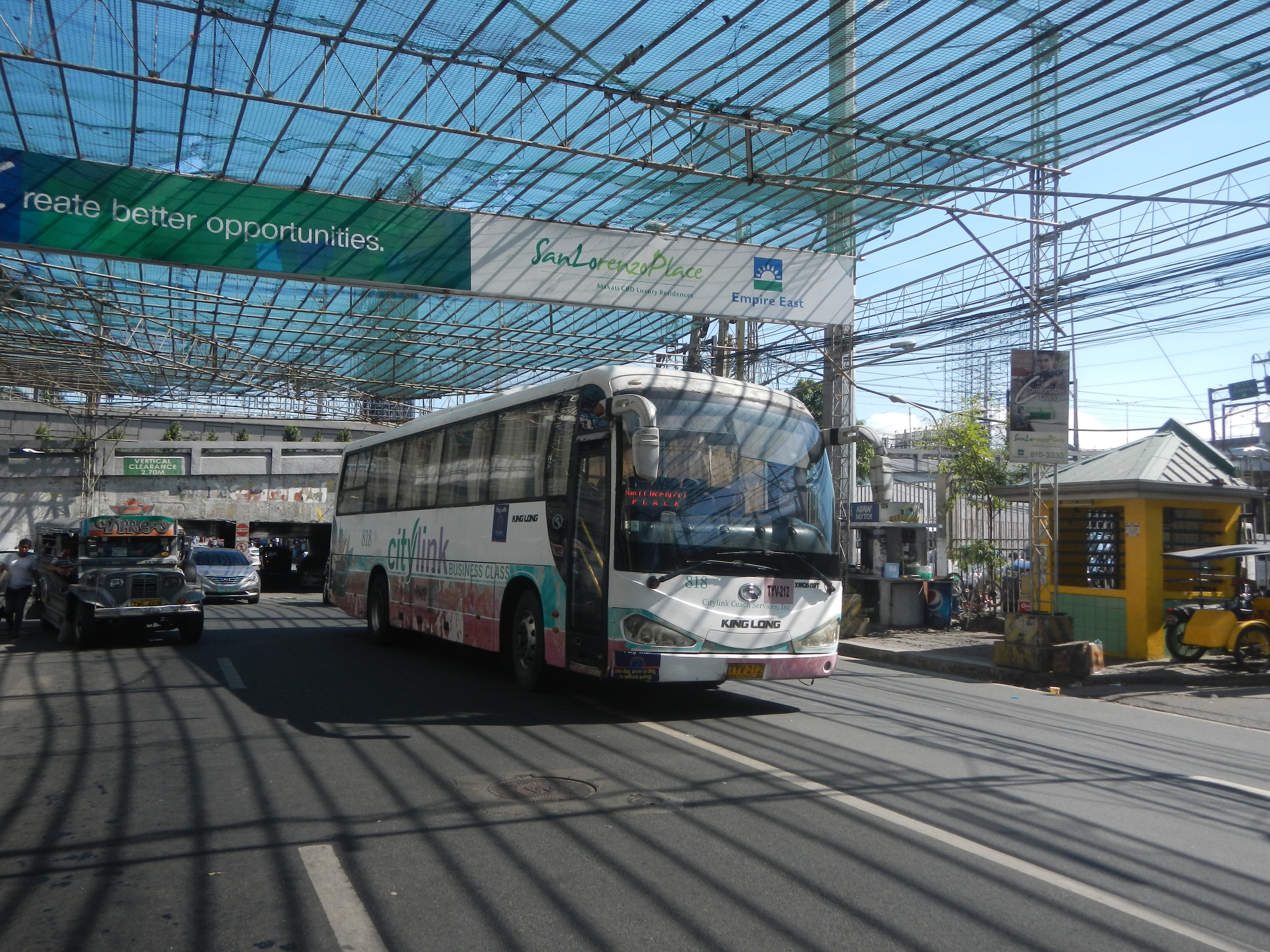
A Citylink XMQ6119T in Magallanes.

== Operations ==
Citylink, like PVP Liner (Ayala-Asturias route), follows the schedules of departures and arrivals. Both buses do not have trips on Sundays.

From Ninoy Aquino International Airport Terminal 3 to Eastwood City, trips are from Monday to Saturday, 6AM - 8AM, and from Monday-Friday, 4PM - 7PM. Every Saturday, only one unit will have a departure time at 4PM.

From Eastwood City to Ninoy Aquino International Airport Terminal 3, trips are from Monday to Saturday, 6AM - 9AM, and from Monday-Friday, 5PM - 7:30PM. Every Saturday, only one unit will have a departure time at 5PM.

Citylink also operates a free shuttle service from Uptown Mall in BGC, to Venice Grand Canal in Mckinley Hills.

== Bus terminals ==
- Eastwood City, Libis, Quezon City - Newport City, Pasay via C-5 Road East Service Road
- EDSA Magallanes Makati - McKinley Hill, Taguig via Bonifacio Global City, Chino Roces Avenue

== See also ==
- List of bus companies of the Philippines
