= Almazora Motors Corporation =

Truck and bus body manufacturer of the Philippines

- Industry: Automotive
- Founded: 1900; 126 years ago (as Carroceria de Almazora); 1925; 101 years ago (as AMC)
- Founder: Canado Almazora; Perfecto Almazora
- Headquarters: Carmona, Cavite, Philippines
- Area served: Philippines
- Key people: Conrad Almazora (Vice President)
- Products: Asian utility vehicles, trucks, buses
- Website: Almazora Motors Corporation Global

Almazora Motors Corporation, also known as Almazora, or AMC, is a truck and bus body manufacturer headquartered in Carmona, Cavite, Philippines. It was established in 1925. It is a leading bus body manufacturer in the Philippines.

== History ==
The company's history dates back to 1900, when Canado Almazora sold horse-driven carriages under Carroceria de Almazora. In 1925, Perfecto Almazora, son of Canado, took over the company and evolved it into a manufacturer of passenger buses. The company is also responsible for making the Jardinera, a wooden made bus type with seven long benches in rows and two entry points. In 1968, Conrado handed the company to his son Cecilio.

== Products ==
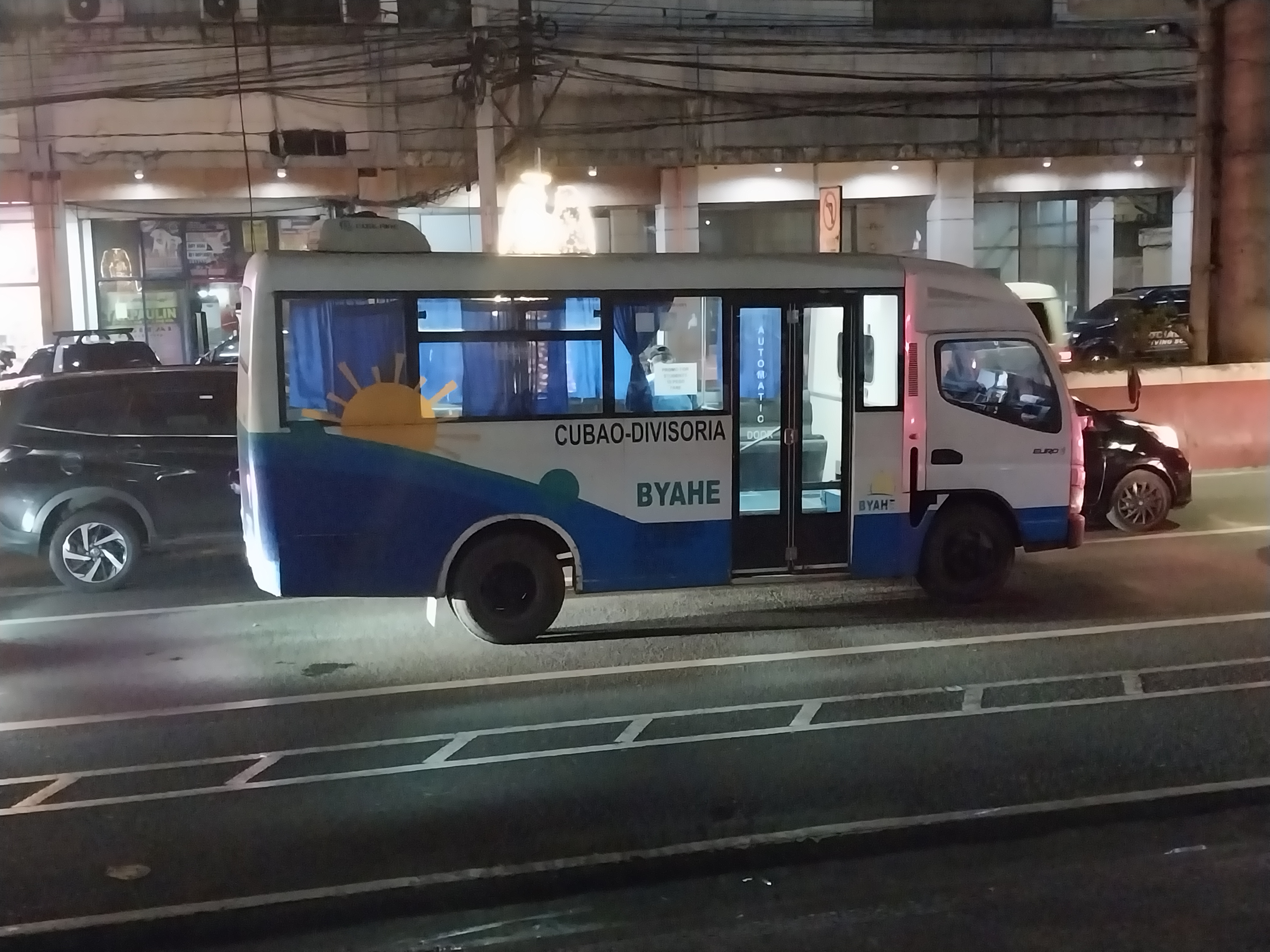
Almazora Bus body Mitsubishi Canter truck bus in Cubao, at night. It plies the Cubao - Divisoria route.

Almazora Motors manufactures the "Family Business" (FB) variant of the Mitsubishi L300 van. The company also assembles bus bodies for Mitsubishi Fuso Truck and Bus Corporation, Isuzu, Hino Motors, MAN Truck & Bus and Mercedes-Benz, as well as truck bodies for special purposes such as fire engines, dump trucks, cargo trucks and ambulances. The company also partnered with Isuzu and Mitsubishi to manufacture modernized public utility vehicles. They also partnered with BEMAC Electric Transportation Philippines to produce electric tricycles.

Buses

• AMC Tourist Star

• AMC City Star

• Mini Bus

• Special Purpose Bus

Former Models

• AMC Travego

• AMC Gala

• AMC Lion's Coach

• AMC Lion's Star

• AMC Travel Star

Multi Purpose Vehicles and Asian Utility vehicles

• Mitsubishi L300 FB (Family Business)

• Hyundai H100 Shuttle

• Isuzu D-Max FlexiQube

• Isuzu QKR77

• 3-Wheeler EV

== See also ==
- List of bus companies of the Philippines
- Public Utility Vehicle Modernization Program
