= Juaymah Maureen Transport =

Bus company in the Philippines

- Founded: 1994
- Headquarters: Las Piñas, Metro Manila and Gen. Mariano Alvarez, Cavite
- Service area: Alabang, Lawton, Ayala, Quiapo, Carmona and Gen. Mariano Alvarez, Cavite
- Service type: City Operation
- Fleet: 29 (Hino)
- Operator: Juaymah Maureen Transport

Juaymah Maureen Transport (JMT) was a bus company owned and operated by a Filipino family from Las Piñas. It plied routes from Alabang in Muntinlupa to Lawton and Quiapo in Manila and sometimes to Ayala in Makati from 1995 to around 2008.

== Etymology ==
The name Juaymah was said to be taken from Leah Juaymah Mababangloob. The name Maureen, on the other hand, was believed to be taken from Maureen Mababangloob. These were the daughters of Oscar and Elenita Mababangloob, the founders of Juaymah Maureen Transport.

== History ==
Juaymah Maureen Transport was established in 1994 by Oscar Mababangloob, a resident of Las Piñas.

As of today, Juaymah Maureen Transport has closed and is no longer in business. During its prime, it was utilising Hino units with a total of 29 buses.

== Recent Incidents ==
In a news article from Abante-Tonite last 2005, twenty-two passengers boarding Juaymah Maureen Transport with an unknown bus unit experienced trauma and fear as they were held up by 5 armed men in almost an hour. Five armed men got on the bus at GMA, Cavite on 7:00 A.M. and upon reaching Carmona Exit toll, they declared hold-up, and all valuables of the 22 passengers were taken. The armed men got off the bus at Arnaiz Avenue, South Luzon Expressway, Makati.

== Issues and Criticisms ==
Juaymah Maureen Transport is the only bus company with air-conditioned units plying routes from Gen. Mariano Alvarez and Carmona, Cavite to Lawton, Quiapo and Ayala. The issue of separation from other bus companies was that JMT has no original franchise from the Land Transportation Franchising and Regulatory Board (LTFRB) so that the motor pools are located at Almanza, Las Piñas and Gen. Mariano Alvarez, Cavite.

Juaymah Maureen Transport has brought up a bad image to many commuters, especially students. One such issue is the illegal increase of the fare upon orders of the bus company management. Based on the blog made by a nursing student, JMT was not included in the present fare hike, thereby charging a higher fare than that of a required fare approved by the LTFRB. It was surprising that the fare matrix the conductor had shown to him was actually a fake one. Until now, most of the conductors are still following rules from the management, though they were actually prohibited by the LTFRB and the Land Transportation Office (LTO) to charge illegal fares and to ply on designated routes.

== Bus Terminals ==
- Metro Manila
  - Quiapo, Manila
  - Plaza Lawton (Park n' Ride), Manila
  - Alabang, Muntinlupa
  - Ayala, Makati
  - Coastal Mall, Parañaque
  - SM Southmall, Las Piñas*
- Provincial Destinations
  - Carmona, Cavite
  - Gen. Mariano Alvarez, Cavite

(*) denotes that is now operated by Jack DM Liner
