= San Agustin Transport =

Bus company in the Philippines

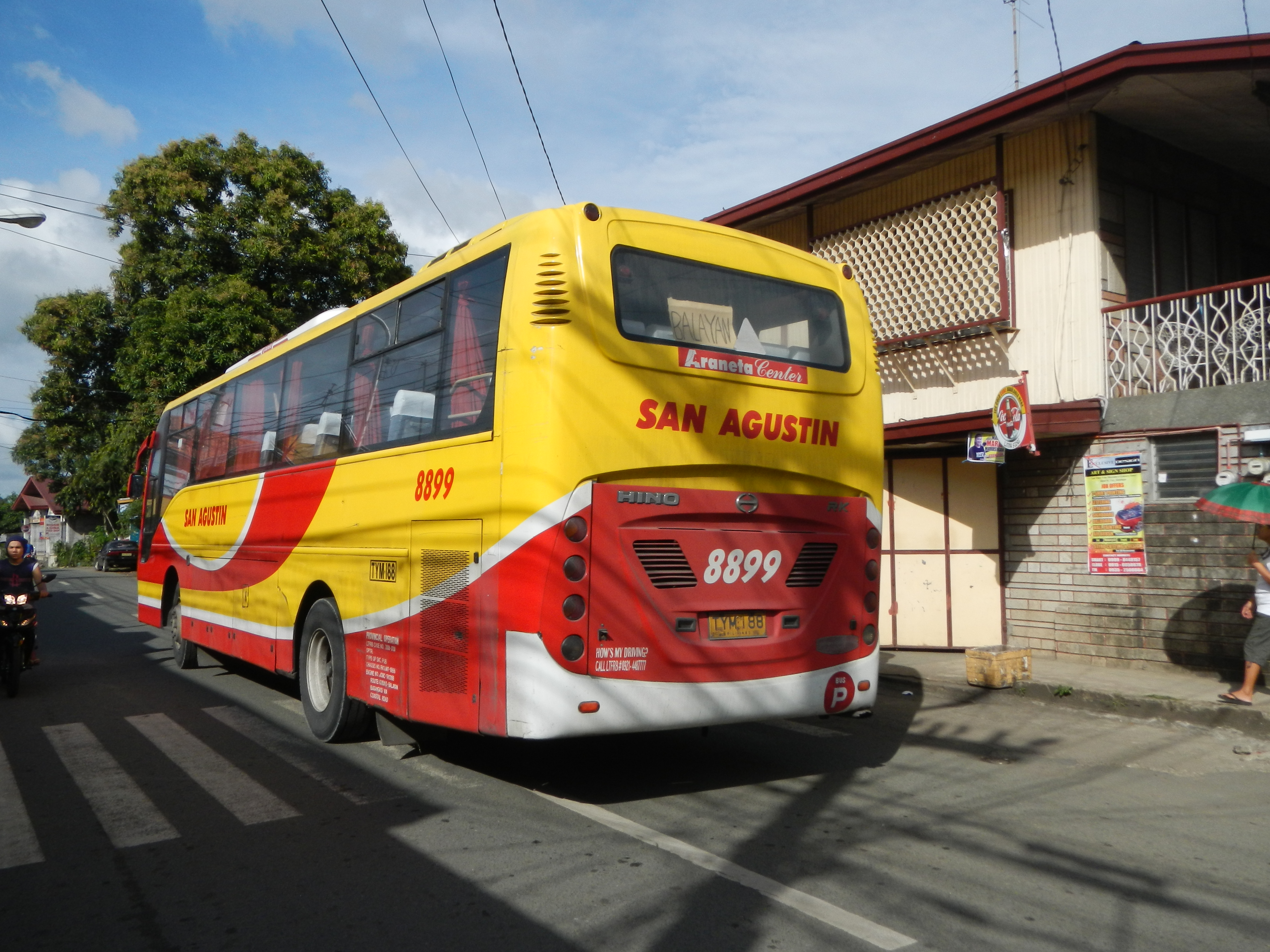
- Rear view of San Agustin 8899 in Tuy, Batangas
- Headquarters: Las Piñas
- Service area: Metro Manila; Cavite; Batangas
- Service type: Bus
- Alliance: Tas Group of Companies
- Stops: Dasmariñas
- Depots: Balayan; Cavite City; Dasmariñas (along Emilio Aguinaldo Highway); Las Piñas; Mendez; Paliparan, Dasmariñas; Nasugbu; Noveleta; Silang
- Operator: San Agustin Transport Service Corporation

San Agustin Transport Service Corporation (SAT) is a Philippine bus company operating in Metro Manila, Cavite, Laguna and Batangas.

== History ==
In December 2018, the Department of Transportation (DOTr) granted special permits to several bus operators, including San Agustin Transport, to operate additional units from the Parañaque Integrated Terminal Exchange (PITX) to Plaza Lawton in Manila. The deployment aimed to address high passenger demand along these routes. San Agustin Transport was authorized to deploy 10 bus units for the PITX–Lawton loop.

In January 2019, San Agustin Transport started its Noveleta to Makati point-to-point (P2P) bus. Mayor Dino Reyes Chua said that San Agustin Transport Service Corp. started operating at 6 a.m. Tuesday with a fleet of seven Golden Dragon buses, proceeding from their pick-up terminals in Puregold Noveleta and All Home, Kawit, going to the drop-off point in Trasierra in Makati City. On January 14 , 2019, San Agustin started their P2P Las Piñas to Makati route.

In May 2020, San Agustin became one of the operators of the EDSA Carousel under the Mega Manila Consortium Corporation, deploying its low-entry bus units that were previously assigned to the Dasmariñas–Plaza Lawton route.

In the same month, during the implementation of the general community quarantine (GCQ) in Metro Manila due to the COVID-19 pandemic, point-to-point buses were among the limited modes of public transportation allowed to resume operations. San Agustin was included in the list released by the Land Transportation Franchising and Regulatory Board (LTFRB) for routes operating from Las Piñas, Noveleta, and Imus to Makati.

In December 2022, AF Payments Inc., the operator of the Beep card system under the consortium of Ayala Corporation and Metro Pacific Investments Corporation, partnered with San Agustin for quick response (QR) ticketing, which covers areas such as in the cities of Taguig, Makati, and Las Piñas, as well as the provinces of Cavite, Laguna, and Bulacan.

== Incidents ==
On May 30, 2024, two buses involving San Agustin and Jasper Jean collided near PITX in Parañaque City. No one was reported injured.

== Routes ==
San Agustin Transport serves routes primarily from upland Cavite, Cavite City, and western Batangas to parts of Metro Manila, including PITX in Parañaque, as well as Pasay, Lawton, and Santa Cruz in Manila. The company also operates rationalized routes in Metro Manila, including the EDSA Carousel, Route 32 (General Mariano Alvarez–PITX), and Route 29 (Silang–PITX).

In January 2019, San Agustin started three point-to-point operations: Imus, Noveleta, and Las Piñas to Makati. In 2020, the operation of point-to-point buses was discontinued during the implementation of enhanced community quarantine and was later resumed during the general community quarantine.

=== Batangas ===
- Nasugbu / Balayan to Pasay / PITX
- Tuy, Lian, Calatagan

=== Cavite and Alabang ===
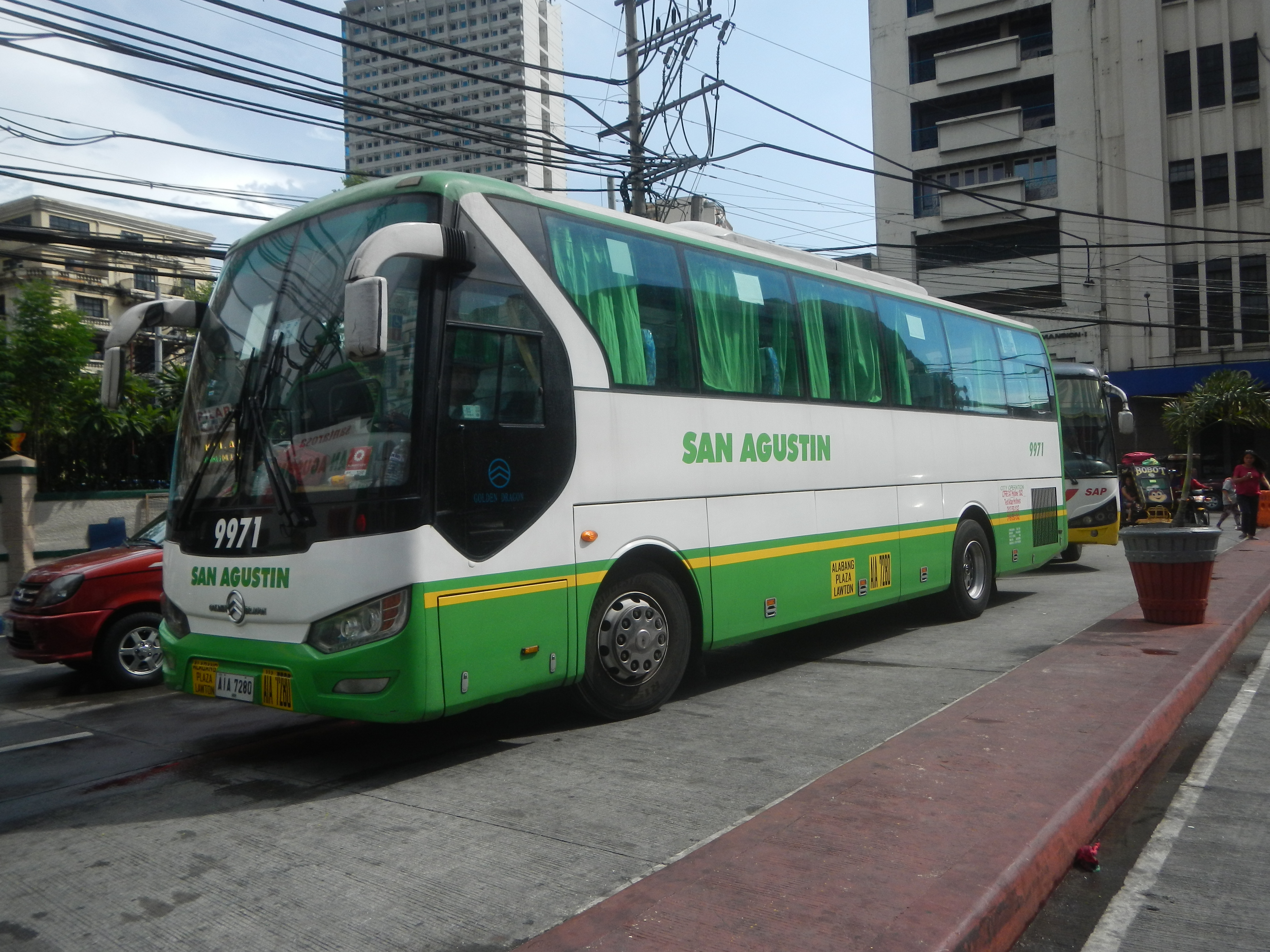
San Agustin serving Alabang to Lawton via Alabang–Zapote Road route

- Alabang to Lawton / PITX via Alabang–Zapote Road
- Carmona to PITX (now serving Route 32 General Mariano Alvarez to PITX)
- Cavite City
- Dasmariñas, Mendez, Tagaytay to Lawton and Santa Cruz in Manila / Pasay / PITX
- Imus / Las Piñas / Noveleta to Makati (Point-to-point)

=== EDSA Carousel ===
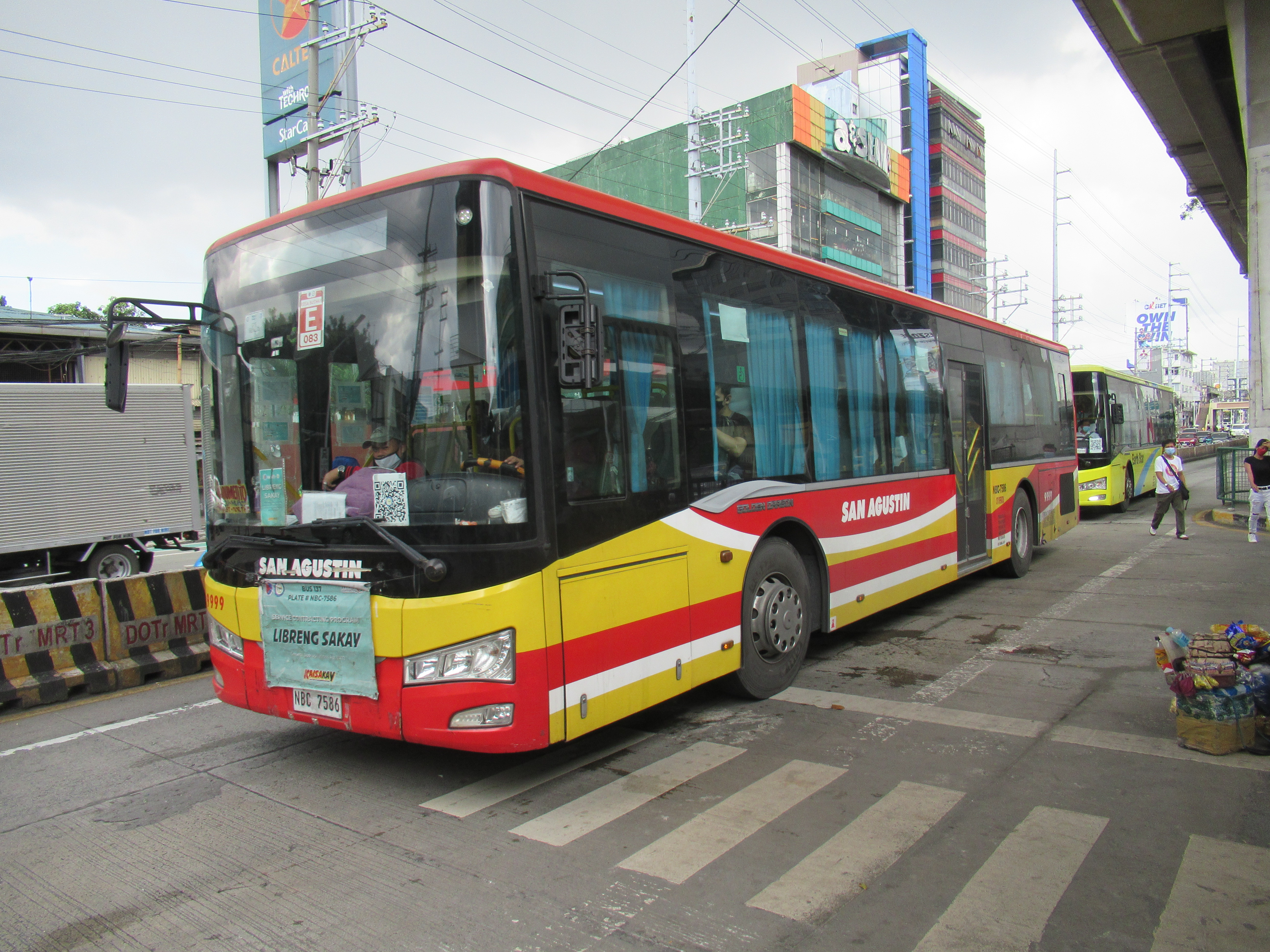
San Agustin's low-entry unit operating in EDSA Busway Carousel

- EDSA Carousel

== See also ==
- EDSA Carousel
- Erjohn & Almark
- List of bus companies of the Philippines
- Premium Point-to-Point Bus Service
- Tas Group of Companies
- TAS Trans
