= Tas Group of Companies =

Philippine transport group

- Type: Public
- Industry: Transportation
- Area served: Philippines
- Key people: Ashley A. Santiaguel; John Benedict Santiaguel

Tas Group of Companies, also known as Tas Trans Group of Companies, is a Philippine-based transport group engaged primarily in provincial and city bus operations in Luzon.

The group comprises several affiliated bus companies, including Erjohn & Almark Transit Corp., TAS Trans Corp., San Agustin Transport Service Corp., and Saint Anthony of Padua Transport Systems, Inc., among others. Collectively, its member companies operate point-to-point (P2P), provincial, and city routes serving Metro Manila and nearby provinces such as Cavite, Laguna, and Batangas. The group is involved in public transport modernization initiatives and partnerships with integrated transport terminals and electronic fare payment systems.

== Subsidiaries ==
=== BSC ===
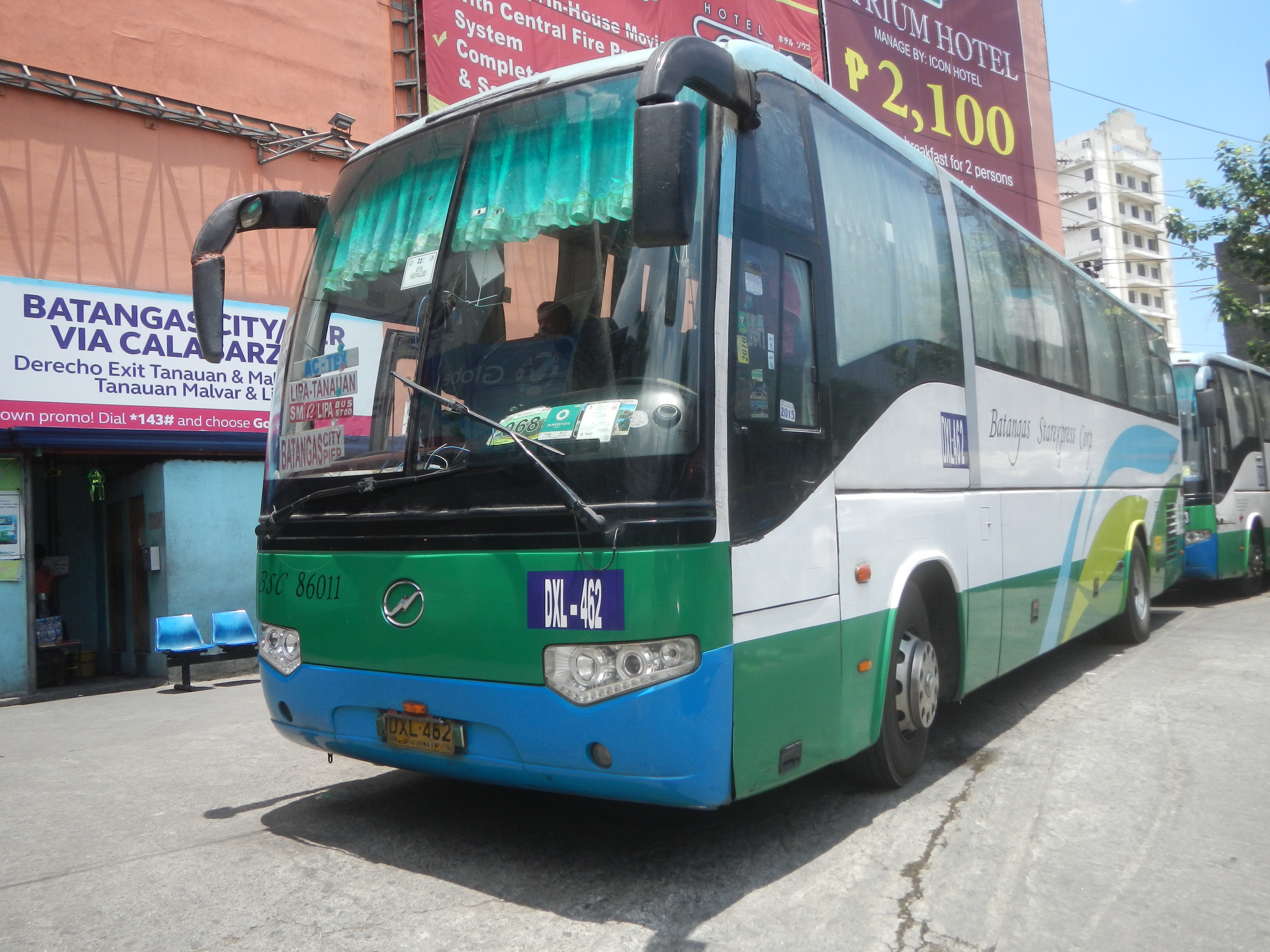
The same livery of BSC used by Batangas StarExpress Corp. when it is under San Agustin management

Batman StarExpress Corp. or simply BSC, is a bus company commonly known for operating Northwest Batangas route to PITX, Pasay, and Batangas City.

=== Bensan Trans ===
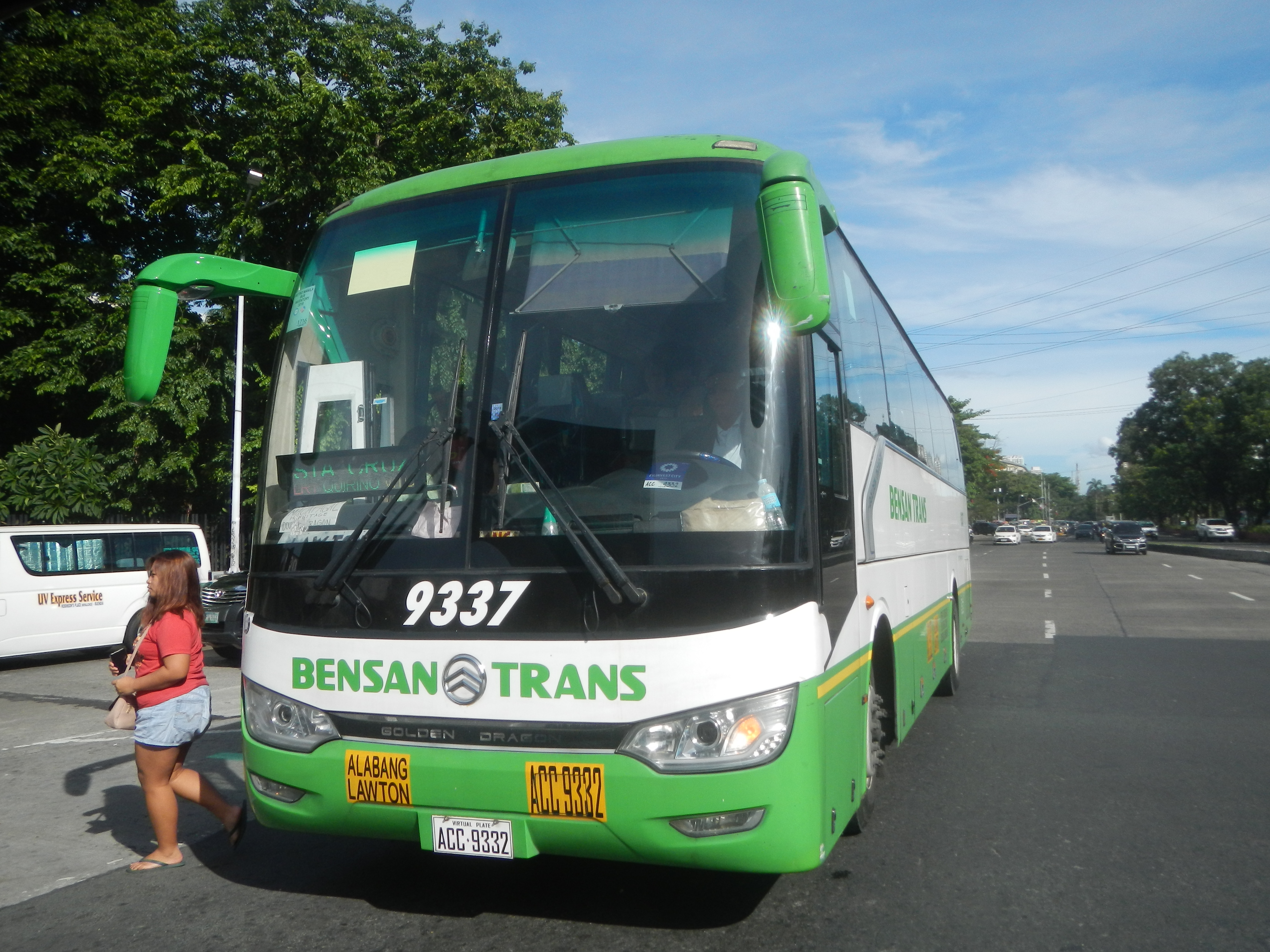
Bensan Trans 9337

Bensan Trans Corp. is a bus company based in Las Piñas known for operating routes from Alabang to Muntinlupa to Plaza Lawton via Alabang–Zapote Road, and BGC.

=== Erjohn & Almark ===
Erjohn & Almark Transit Corp. is a bus company based in Silang, Cavite operating routes from Western Batangas and upland Cavite to parts of Metro Manila including PITX, Makati and Lawton.

In September 2013, Erjohn & Almark, along with TAS Trans filed a civil lawsuit against the City of Manila and its top officials, including then-Mayor Joseph Estrada. The petition sought to block a citywide bus ban that prohibited provincial buses without terminals in Manila from entering the city.

In May 2025, Erjohn & Almark Transit and TAS Trans joined the Drayberks: Ready 4 Safety campaign, an initiative aimed at promoting road safety awareness among commercial drivers traveling along the CALAX and CAVITEX networks.

=== JRMS Golden Sky Transport ===
JRMS Golden Sky Transport Inc., or simply known as JRMS Transport, is a bus company operating in Metro Manila. The company is known for operating Malanday to Muntinlupa via EDSA, Monumento route and rationalized route PITX to Monumento.

The bus company was suspended by the Land Transportation Franchising and Regulatory Board (LTFRB) for three months from March 2011 for allegedly participating in a bus strike that affected thousands of Metro Manila commuters on Nov. 15, 2010.

=== San Agustin ===
San Agustin Transport Service Corporation (SAT) is a Philippine bus company operating in Metro Manila, Cavite, and Batangas. It provides various public transport services, including regular and point-to-point (P2P) buses connecting areas like Las Piñas to Makati.

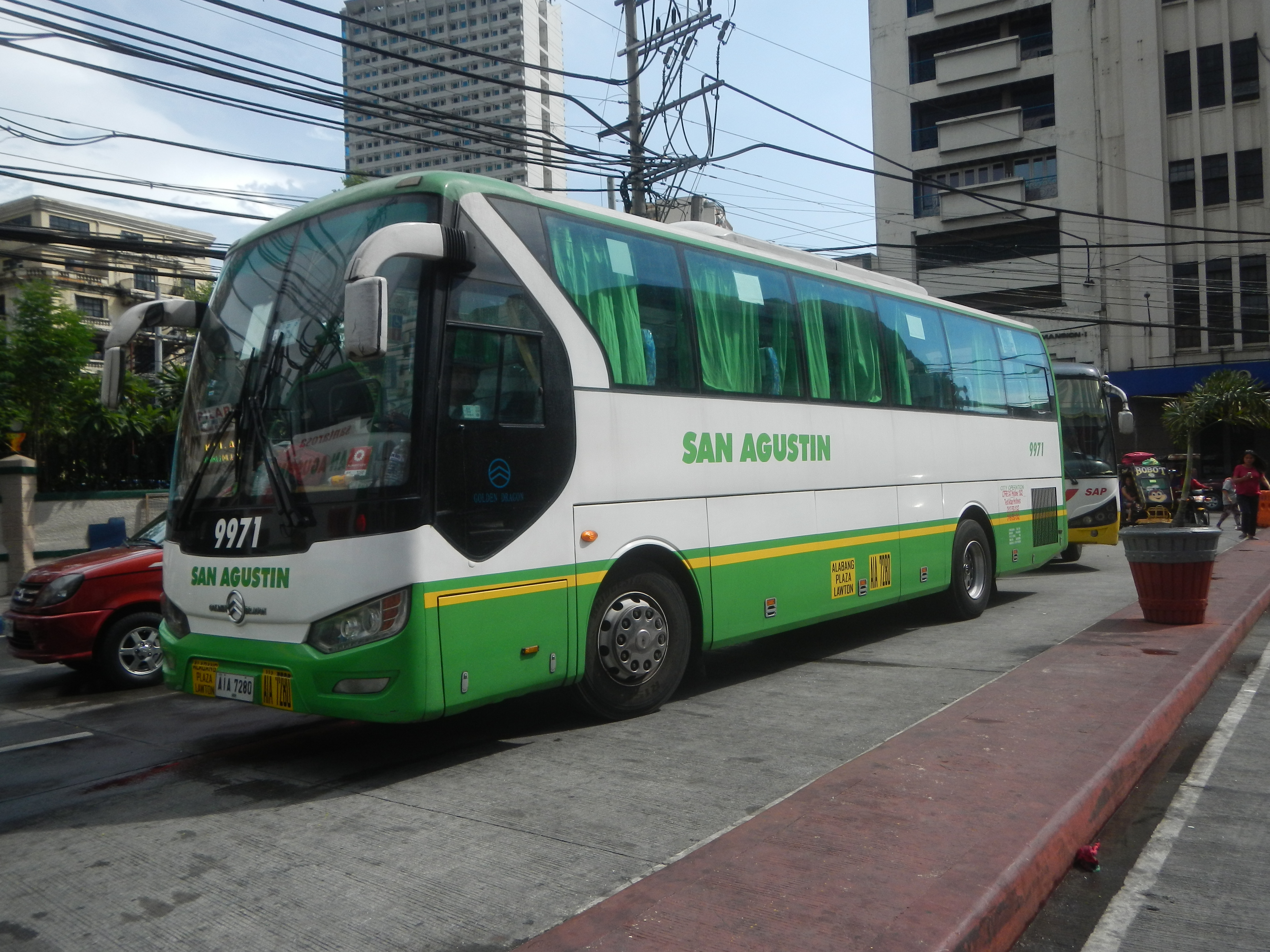
San Agustin 9971 in Manila

In December 2018, the Department of Transportation (DOTr) granted special permits to several bus operators, including San Agustin Transport, to operate additional units from the Parañaque Integrated Terminal Exchange (PITX) to Plaza Lawton in Manila. The deployment aimed to address high passenger demand along these routes. San Agustin Transport was authorized to deploy 10 bus units for the PITX–Lawton loop.

In January 2019, San Agustin Transport started its Noveleta to Makati point-to-point (P2P) bus. Mayor Dino Reyes Chua said that San Agustin Transport Service Corp. started operating at 6 a.m. Tuesday with a fleet of seven Golden Dragon buses, proceeding from their pick-up terminals in Puregold Noveleta and All Home, Kawit, going to the drop-off point in Trasierra in Makati City.

In May 2020, San Agustin became one of the operators of the EDSA Carousel under the Mega Manila Consortium Corporation, deploying its low-entry bus units that were previously assigned to the Dasmariñas–Plaza Lawton route.

In December 2022, AF Payments Inc., the operator of the Beep card system under the consortium of Ayala Corporation and Metro Pacific Investments Corporation, partnered with San Agustin for quick response (QR) ticketing, which covers areas such as in the cities of Taguig, Makati, and Las Piñas, as well as the provinces of Cavite, Laguna, and Bulacan.

=== Saint Anthony of Padua ===
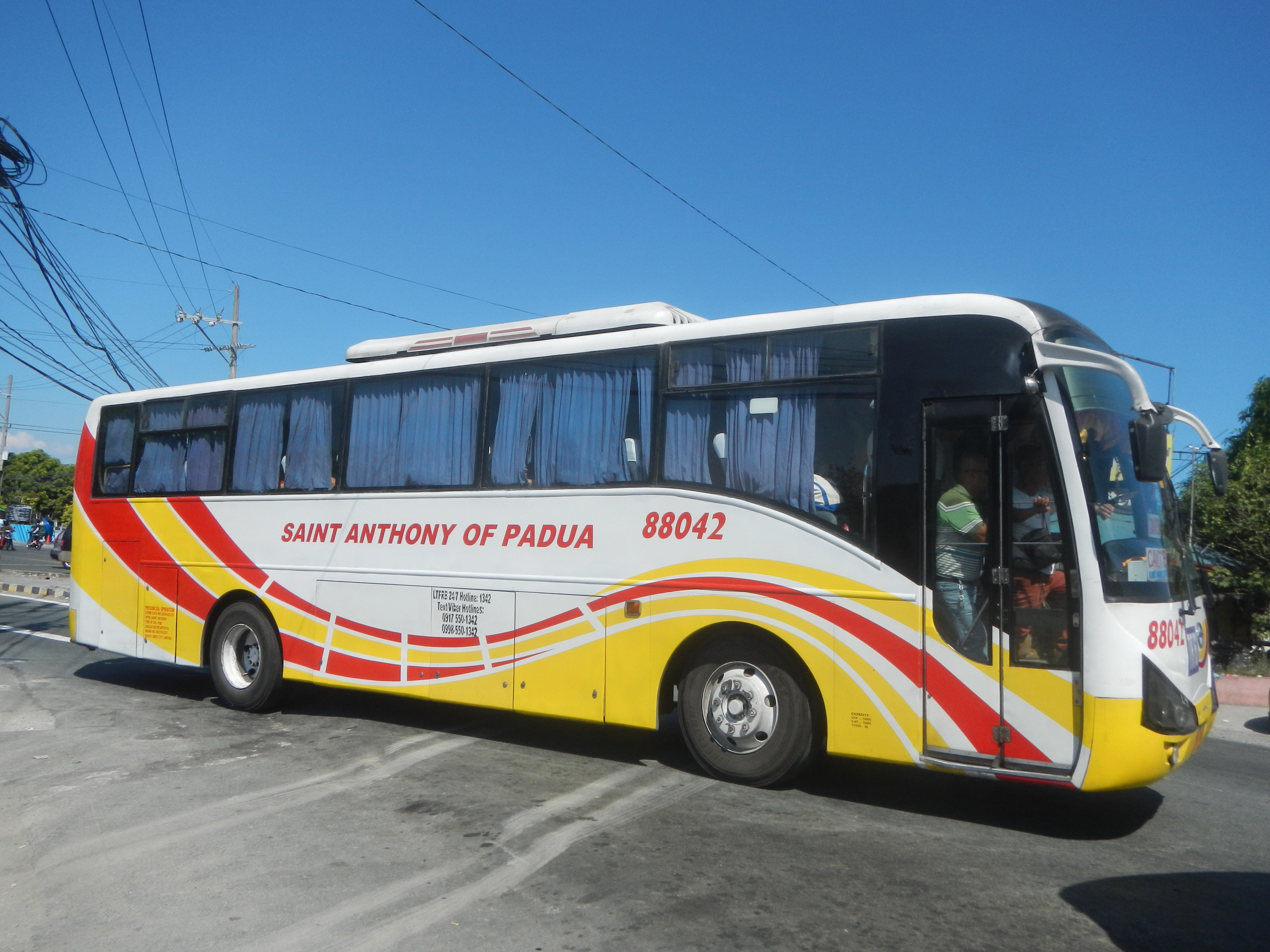
Saint Anthony of Padua 88042 in Kawit, Cavite

Saint Anthony of Padua Transport Systems Inc. (SAP) is a bus company known for operating routes from Western Cavite to Metro Manila. The bus company operates Ternate Maragondon, Naic, Cavite City to PITX and Plaza Lawton. SAP also serves General Mariano Alvarez route and special routes in upland Cavite via Emilio Aguinaldo Highway.

=== Seven Sky Express Liner ===
Seven Sky Express Liner Corp. is a bus company operating routes NAIA to Malanday via EDSA.

=== TAS Trans ===
TAS Trans Corporation is a bus company known operating routes mainly from Alabang in Muntinlupa to Plaza Lawton via Alabang–Zapote Route and premium premium point-to-point. In August 2017, the company partnered with AF Payments Inc., the operator of the Beep card system under the consortium of Ayala Corporation and Metro Pacific Investments Corporation, to enable cashless payments on its point-to-point buses serving Nuvali in Santa Rosa, Laguna to Makati City.

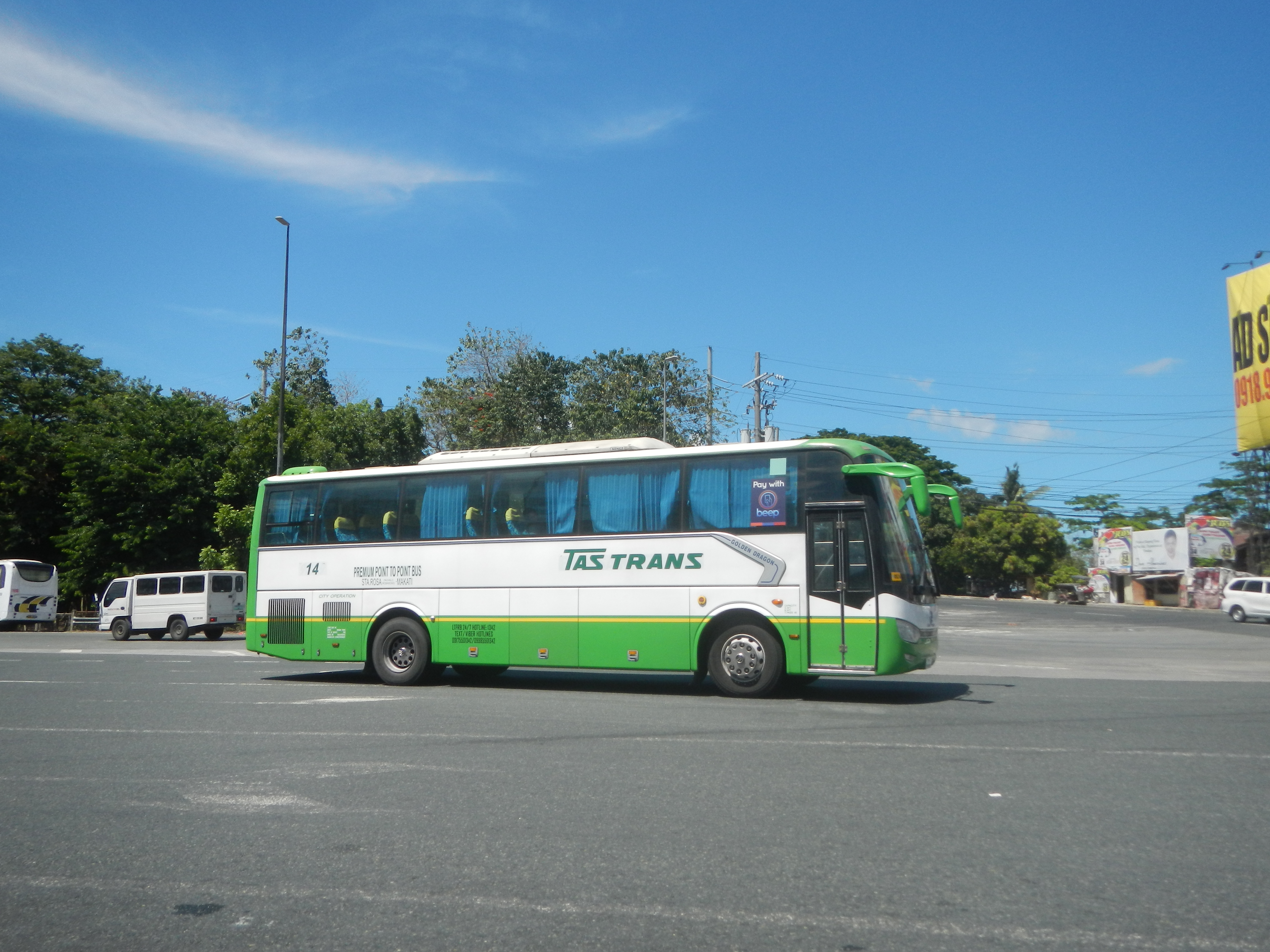
TAS Trans in Laguna

In September 2013, TAS Trans, along with Erjohn & Almark, filed a civil lawsuit against the City of Manila and its top officials, including then-Mayor Joseph Estrada. The petition sought to block a citywide bus ban that prohibited provincial buses without terminals in Manila from entering the city.

In May 2025, TAS Trans and Erjohn & Almark Transit joined the "Drayberks: Ready 4 Safety" campaign, an initiative aimed at promoting road safety awareness among commercial drivers traveling along the CALAX and Cavitex networks.
