= TAS Trans =

Bus company in the Philippines

TAS Trans Corp.

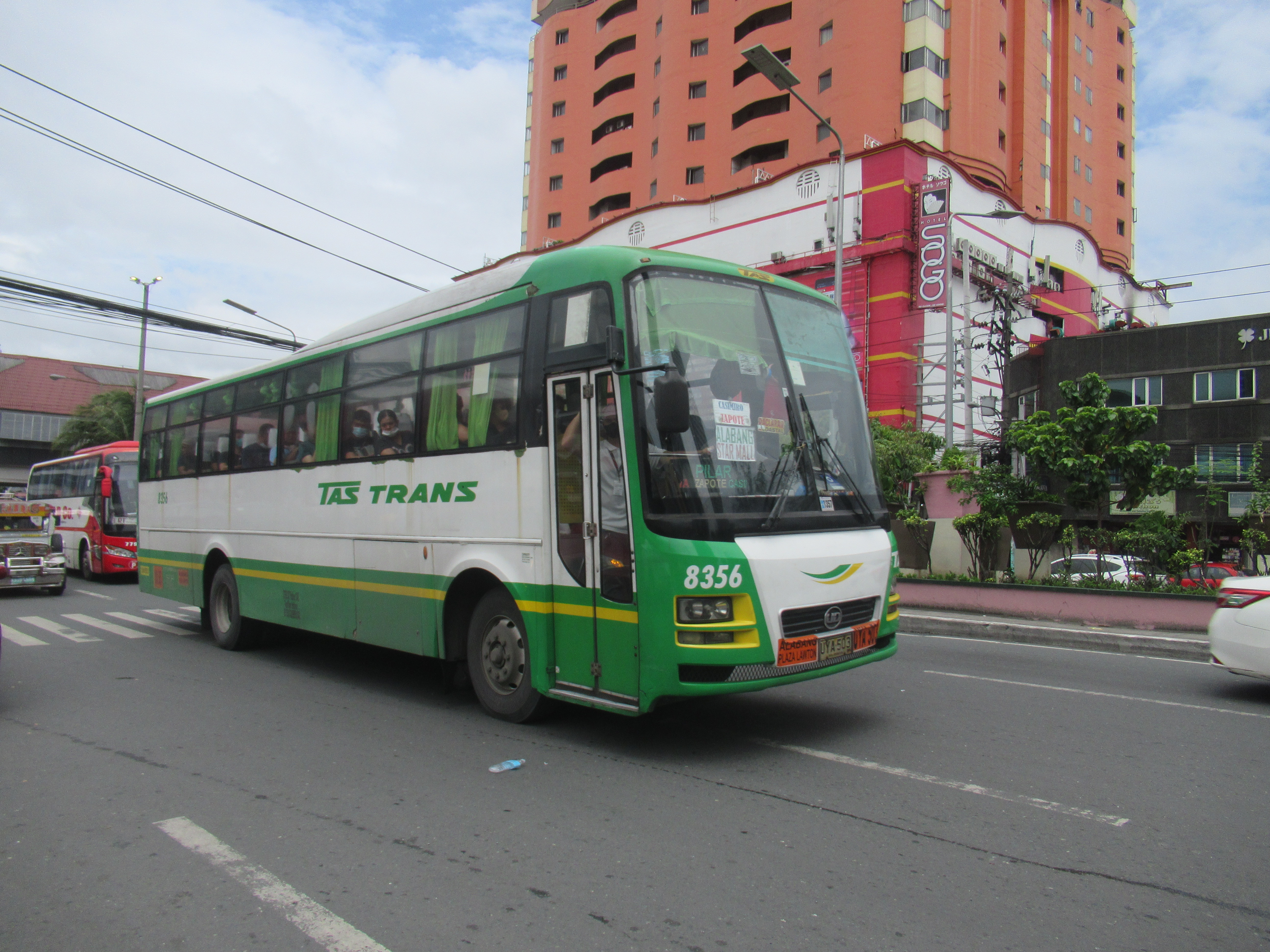
- TAS Trans 8356 in Buendia, Pasay City
- Founded: 1990s
- Headquarters: Las Piñas City
- Service area: Metro Manila; Laguna
- Service type: Bus
- Alliance: Tas Group of Companies
- Routes: 3
- Hubs: Las Piñas City
- Operator: TAS Transport Corporation

TAS Transport Corporation is a Philippine bus company known for operating premium point-to-point (P2P) buses and routes Alabang in Muntinlupa to Lawton in Manila via Alabang–Zapote Road.

TAS Trans is part of Tas Group of Companies which also manages other bus companies, including San Agustin Transport, Bensan Trans, and Saint Anthony of Padua Transport Systems, Inc.

== History ==
In September 2013, TAS Trans, alongside its sister company Erjohn & Almark Transit and several other bus operators, filed a civil lawsuit against the City of Manila and its top officials, including then-Mayor Joseph Estrada. The petition sought to block a city-wide bus ban (Resolution No. 48) that prohibited provincial buses without terminals in Manila from entering the city. The operators argued that the ban violated national laws and was implemented without due process.

In August 2017, TAS Trans partnered with AF Payments Inc., the operator of the Beep card system under the consortium of Ayala Corporation and Metro Pacific Investments Corporation, to enable cashless payments on its point-to-point (P2P) buses serving Nuvali in Santa Rosa, Laguna to Makati City. The company also introduced a promotional fare in line with the launch of the new payment system.

In May 2020, during the implementation of the general community quarantine (GCQ) in Metro Manila due to the COVID-19 pandemic, point-to-point buses were among the limited modes of public transportation allowed to resume operations. TAS Trans was included in the list released by the Land Transportation Franchising and Regulatory Board (LTFRB) for routes operating between Santa Rosa, Laguna (Nuvali) and Makati. In 2021, the city government of Las Piñas deployed two TAS Trans buses to transport city hall employees to and from work. Mayor Imelda Aguilar stated that the buses supplemented the six electric jeepneys already serving city health workers.

In May 2025, TAS Trans, along with Parañaque Integrated Terminal Exchange, One Ayala Terminal, and other major transport operators, including Erjohn & Almark and Saulog Transit, joined the Drayberks: Ready 4 Safety campaign, an initiative aimed at promoting road safety awareness among commercial drivers traveling along the CALAX and Cavitex networks. Following this, the company's employees attended a road safety seminar entitled "Alerto Kada Kilometro".

== Routes ==
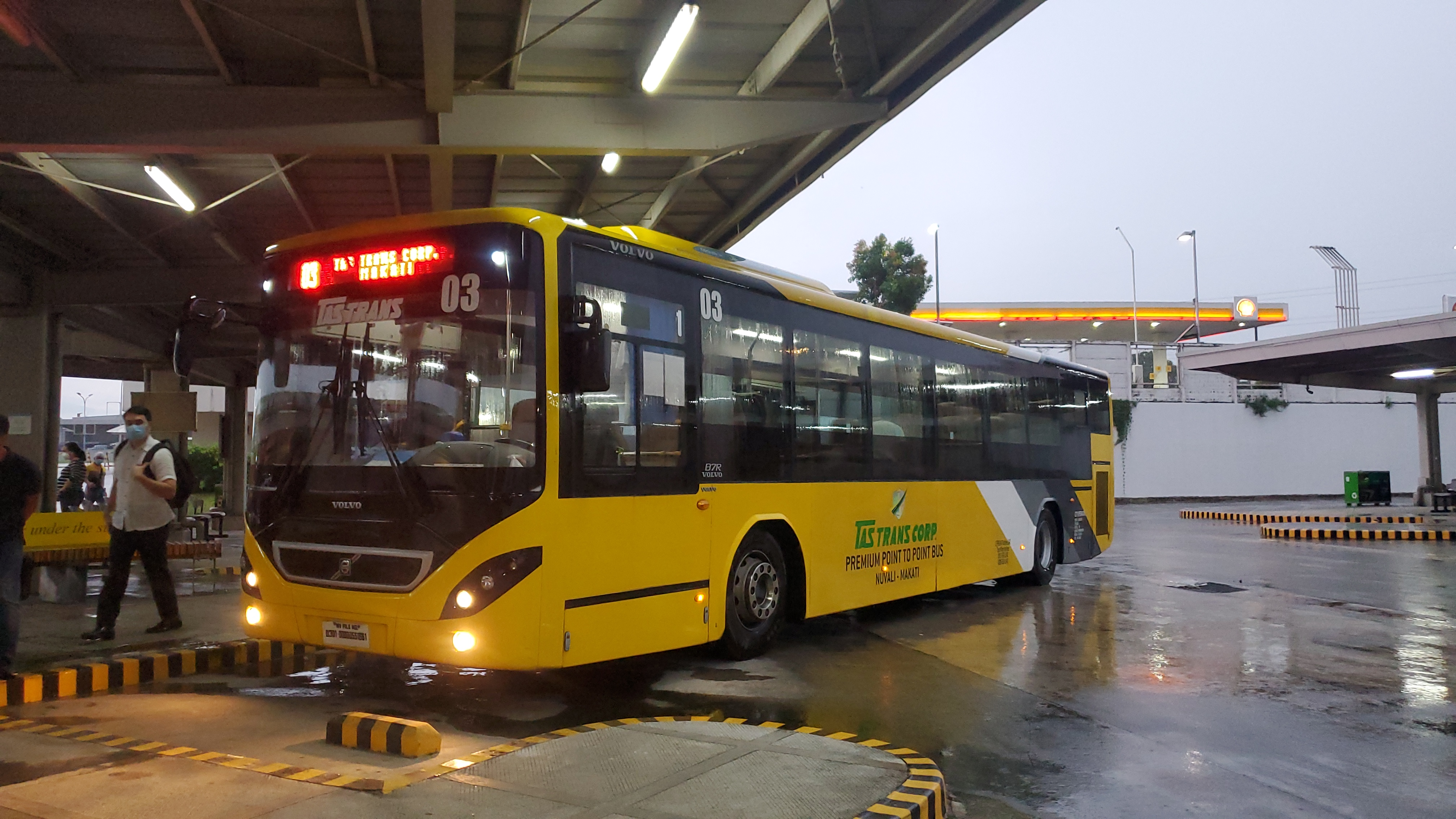
A Tas Trans' P2P bus parked at Nuvali Transport Terminal in Santa Rosa, Laguna

- Alabang in Muntinlupa City to Lawton in Manila City via Alabang–Zapote Road, Buendia
- Nuvali (Sta. Rosa), Laguna to Makati
- Alabang to PITX via Alabang–Zapote Road

=== Special routes ===
- Tagaytay, Nasugbu to PITX, Pasay

== See also ==
- List of bus companies of the Philippines
- Premium Point-to-Point Bus Service
- Tas Group of Companies
