= Erjohn & Almark =

Bus company in the Philippines

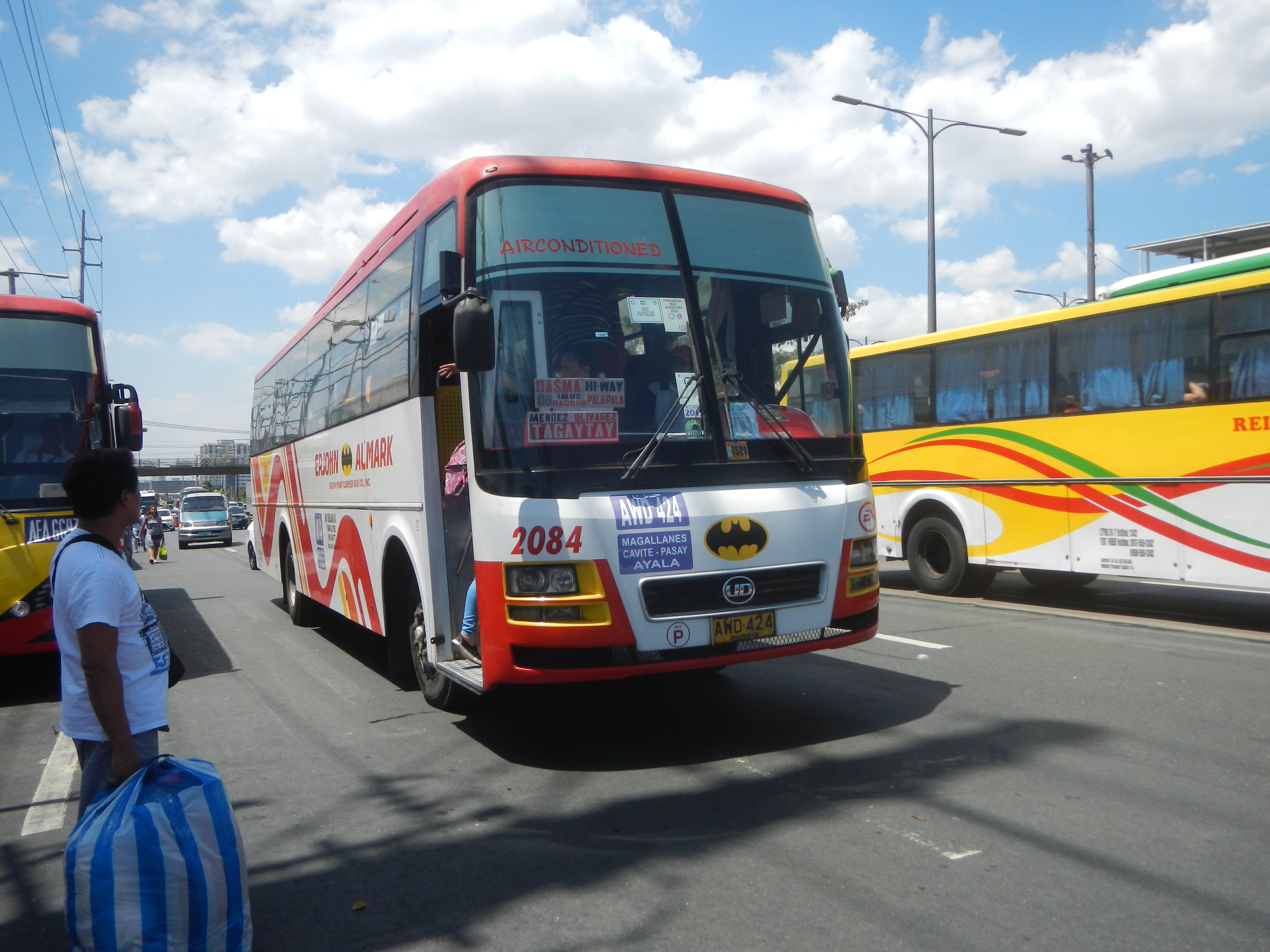
- Headquarters: Silang, Cavite
- Service area: Cavite • Batangas • Metro Manila
- Service type: Bus
- Alliance: Tas Group of Companies
- Routes: 13
- Hubs: Silang
- Depots: General Trias; Mendez; Nasugbu; Silang
- Operator: Erjohn & Almark Transit Corp.

Erjohn & Almark Transit Corporation (EA) is a Philippine provincial and city bus company based in Silang, Cavite.

== History ==
Erjohn & Almark Transit Corp. is part of the Tas Group of Companies and operates as a sister company to TAS Trans Corp., a bus company which mainly plies from Alabang in Muntinlupa City to Lawton in Manila City. Like its sister company, it started operation in Las Piñas City before having Cavite routes.

In the mid-2000s, Crow Transport Services, Inc., which operated routes in western Batangas and upland Cavite, was acquired by Genesis Transport Service, Inc. and renamed as South Luzon Crown Transport, Inc. The company later faced increasing competition from various Cavite-based operators, including Erjohn & Almark. Around 2008, Erjohn & Almark acquired the assets and operations of South Luzon Crown Transport, further expanding its presence in western Batangas and Cavite provincial routes.

In 2005, Isuzu Philippines Corporation released a fleet of Isuzu FTR33P 61-seater air-conditioned buses powered by 6HH1 diesel engines to Erjohn & Almark as part of a delivery program involving a total of 50 units for commuter bus operations. The units were assigned to several provincial and city routes, including Alabang–Lawton, Dasmariñas–Lawton, and Balayan–Lawton. The turnover of the buses was attended by representatives from Isuzu Philippines Corporation, Erjohn & Almark Transit Corp., and partner body manufacturers, including Erjohn & Almark President Lito Santiaguel, Erjohn Human Resources and General Services Manager Art Gavino, Isuzu Philippines Corporation bus sales manager Mario Ojales, Almazora Motors Corporation Vice President for Marketing Tony Litonjua, and IPC Technical Manager Engr. Ramil Mendoza.

In 2011, Erjohn & Almark established South Point Carrier Bus Company, Inc. after taking over a franchise for the Nasugbu–Lawton route, previously operated by Mindanao Express. The company operates provincial buses using units from the Erjohn & Almark fleet. In 2012, Erjohn & Almark launched EAS Traveller Shuttle Inc., a shuttle service in Laguna that uses retired buses from their main fleet.

In September 2013, Erjohn & Almark, alongside TAS Trans and several other operators, filed a civil lawsuit against the City of Manila and its top officials, including then-Mayor Joseph Estrada. The petition sought to block a city-wide bus ban (Resolution No. 48) that prevented provincial buses without terminals in Manila from entering the city, with the operators arguing that the ban violated national laws and lacked due process.

In 2019, Erjohn & Almark acquired Zhongtong LCK6125G Fashion low-entry bus as compliance to stricter government regulations.

In August 2022, Erjohn & Almark joined the EDSA Carousel operations, deploying five bus units that were previously assigned to the Dasmariñas–Ayala, Makati route via Coastal Road. The company also began operating Route 32 (General Mariano Alvarez–PITX) with 20 bus units. In 2024, however, the company withdrew from EDSA Carousel, ending the deployment of its five bus units on the route.

In 2024, Erjohn & Almark was among the participating sponsors of the Streetboys reunion concert, a talent showcase featuring several Philippine dance groups that rose to prominence in the 1990s. During media interviews promoting the event, Streetboys member Meynard Marcellano expressed gratitude for the support of Erjohn & Almark and the event's producers, stating that their support helped bring together various 1990s dance groups for the reunion performance.

In May 2025, Erjohn & Almark, along with Parañaque Integrated Terminal Exchange (PITX), One Ayala Terminal and other major transport operators, including Jasper Jean Services, and Saulog Transit joined the Drayberks: Ready 4 Safety campaign, an initiative aimed at promoting road safety awareness among commercial drivers traveling along the CALAX and CAVITEX networks.

== Subsidiaries ==
=== South Point Carrier ===
South Point Carrier Bus Co., Inc.

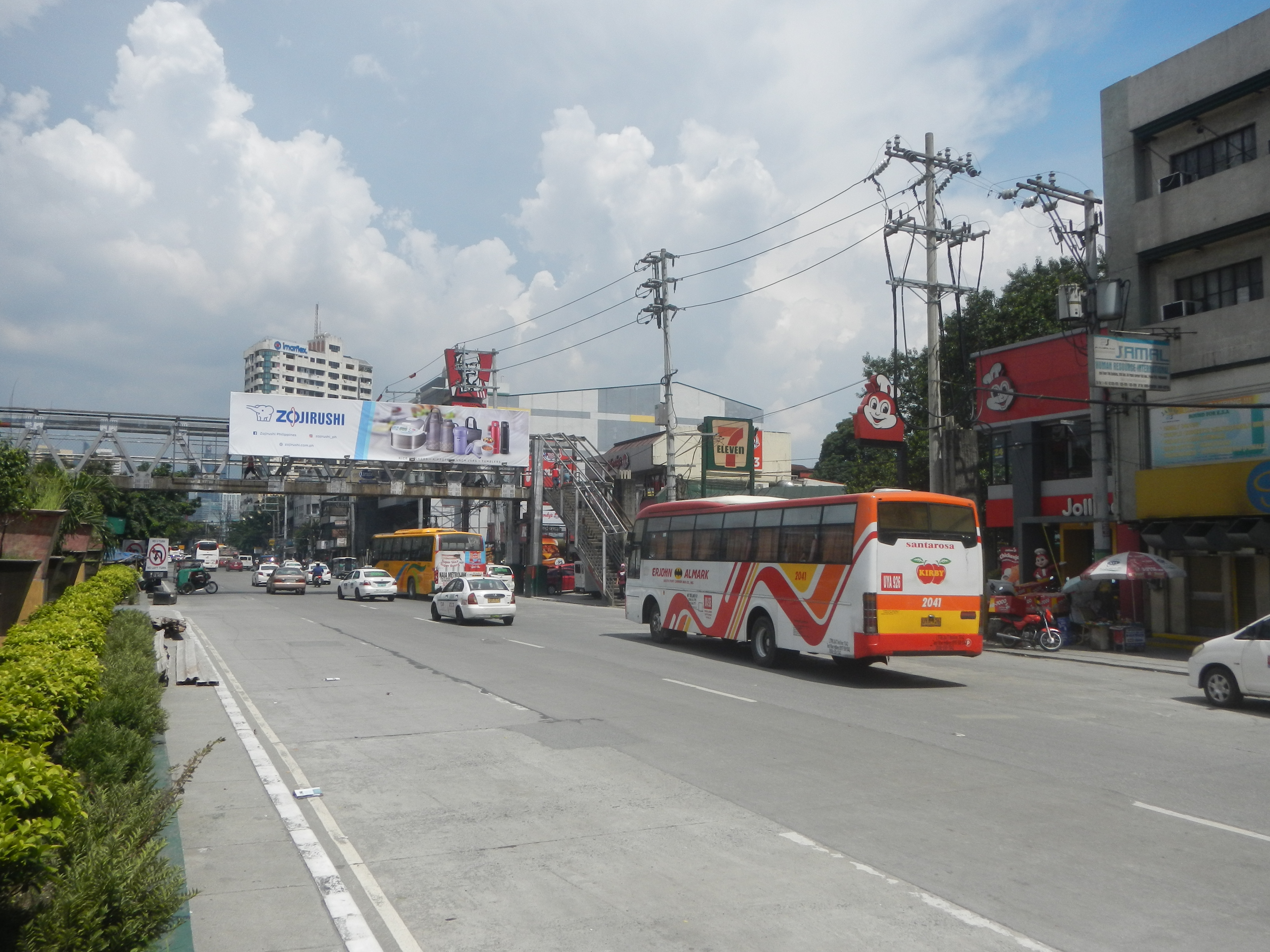
- South Point Carrier 2041 in Taft Avenue, Pasay, 2017
- Parent: Erjohn & Almark
- Founded: 2011
- Headquarters: Silang, Cavite
- Service area: Cavite • Batangas • Metro Manila
- Service type: Provincial bus
- Hubs: Silang
- Depots: General Trias; Mendez; Nasugbu; Silang
- Operator: South Point Carrier Bus Co., Inc.

South Point Carrier Bus Company, Inc. is a bus company established by Erjohn & Almark in 2011 after the company took over a franchise for the Nasugbu–Lawton route. The franchise operates several Hino RK buses previously operated by the former competitor Mindanao Express. The company operates provincial bus services using units from the Erjohn & Almark fleet, serving routes such as Nasugbu–Lawton, Silang–Divisoria via Lawton, and GMA–PITX.

The company once served now-defunct routes such as Magallanes to Pasay.

=== EAS Traveller ===
EAS Traveller Shuttle Inc.
- Founded: 2012
- Headquarters: Laguna
- Service area: Laguna • Metro Manila
- Service type: Bus
- Depots: Laguna
- Operator: EAS Traveller Shuttle Inc.

EAS Traveller Shuttle Inc. or EAS Traveller Shuttle Service is a shuttle service established by Erjohn & Almark in 2012 that mainly operates in Laguna. The company uses several retired buses from the Erjohn & Almark fleet for its shuttle operations.

== Issues and criticisms ==
In April 2014, the MTRCB summoned Erjohn & Almark along with Baes Express and Alfonso Liner after an inspection at the Southwest Integrated Provincial Transport terminal in Coastal Mall, Parañaque City found a bus unit exhibiting unrated videos. The agency confiscated the items and reminded the company that PUVs are restricted to showing only "G" or "PG" rated content, with violators facing fines of up to ₱5,000 or franchise cancellation.

The company has been involved in labor-related litigation concerning employee compensation and dismissal. In February 2021, the Supreme Court issued a final decision in Concordio v. Erjohn & Almark Transit Corp. (G.R. No. 250147), concluding a nearly two-decade labor dispute. The Court reversed a previous Court of Appeals ruling and ordered the company to immediately reinstate several drivers and conductors to their former positions. The dispute stemmed from the company's refusal to reinstate the employees despite a September 2010 decision of the National Labor Relations Commission (NLRC), which had become final and executory on December 24, 2010. The Supreme Court ruled that the company was bound to comply with the reinstatement order upon its finality and, having failed to do so, was liable for backwages reckoned from December 24, 2010 until actual or payroll reinstatement. The company was also ordered to pay legal interest on the monetary award, which was estimated at more than ₱2.4 million for the affected employees.

In July 2024, a traffic enforcer identified as Alfredo Datoon of the Dasmariñas Traffic Management Unit was killed after being struck and dragged by an Erjohn & Almark Transit bus along Aguinaldo Highway near Pala-Pala in Dasmariñas, Cavite. According to police reports, the enforcer had flagged down the bus for allegedly loading passengers in a no-loading zone before an altercation reportedly occurred between him and the driver, who was later taken into police custody as authorities investigated whether the incident was intentional.

On August 20, 2025, an Erjohn & Almark bus was involved in a collision along Aguinaldo Highway in Barangay Anabu 1-D, Imus City. According to police reports, the bus was struck from behind by a Don Aldrin bus, resulting in injuries to seven individuals, including the driver of the other vehicle.

== Routes ==
=== Interim provincial terminal system (2013–2017) ===
Pursuant to Administrative Order No. 40, dated July 16, 2013, which provides for the establishment of interim transport terminals in preparation for an integrated transport system under Executive Order No. 67 (s. 2012), Commonwealth Act No. 146 as amended, and Executive Order No. 202, the Board directed that all provincial public utility buses originating from south of Metro Manila entering via Coastal Road or the Manila–Cavite Expressway shall terminate their routes at the Southwest Interim Transport Terminal (SITT) located at Uniwide Coastal Mall in Parañaque. As a result, bus routes previously extending into inner Metro Manila areas were rerouted to terminate at the SITT, including services operated by Erjohn & Almark and sister company South Point Carrier.

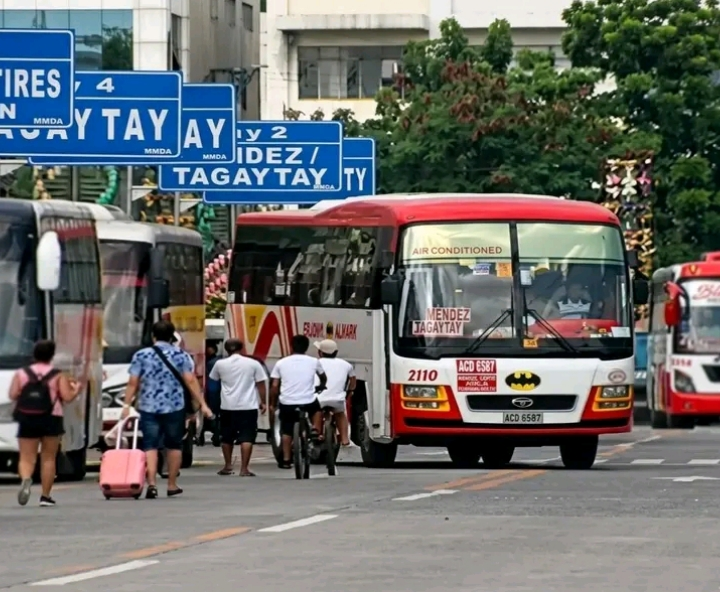
Erjohn & Almark 2110 at Southwest Integrated Provincial Terminal, May 2017

In 2017, operations serving Cavite and western Batangas were transferred from SITT at Coastal Mall to the newly opened Southwest Integrated Provincial Transport System (SWIPTS) terminal along Macapagal Boulevard in Pasay. Established by the Department of Transportation as part of its integrated transport terminal program to serve approximately 1,000 provincial buses from Cavite and western Batangas.

=== Parañaque Integrated Terminal Exchange (PITX) integration (2018–2019) ===
With the opening of the Parañaque Integrated Terminal Exchange (PITX) in November 2018, provincial buses entering Metro Manila from the southwest were generally required to terminate at the new terminal. However, under LTFRB Memorandum Circular No. 2018-022, certain routes within the Greater Manila Area were converted into city operations and exempted from mandatory termination at PITX. Among the areas covered were Dasmariñas and Silang in Cavite, which allows eligible Erjohn & Almark and South Point Carrier units operating within these routes to continue traversing Metro Manila while passing through PITX for passenger pick-up and drop-off. Long distance provincial routes, including routes from Western Batangas, will still terminate at PITX.

=== COVID-19 route rationalization (2020–2021) ===
During the COVID-19 pandemic, public transportation in Metro Manila and surrounding provinces was reorganized under the government's route rationalization. In June 2020, the LTFRB opened Route 28 (PITX–Dasmariñas), a city bus route. Erjohn & Almark and South Point Carrier became one of the operators participating in the route under the Mega Manila Consortium Corporation, resulting in their Dasmariñas and General Trias route terminating at PITX.

=== 2022–present ===
In August 2022, Erjohn & Almark joined the EDSA Carousel operations, deploying five bus units that were previously assigned to the Dasmariñas–Ayala, Makati route via Coastal Road. The company also began operating Route 32 (General Mariano Alvarez–PITX) (formerly Route 29) with 20 bus units. In 2024, however, the company withdrew from the EDSA Carousel, ending the deployment of its five bus units on the route.

In September 2022, the Land Transportation Franchising and Regulatory Board (LTFRB) issued a memorandum circular renumbering the pre-pandemic PITX–Dasmariñas route from Route 28 to Route 27.

In 2025, the company resumed operations on its Mendez / General Trias–Ayala corridor, serving the One Ayala Terminal in Makati. This marked the return of the company to Ayala-bound routes after the suspension or reduction of its operations on the route in the early 2020s.

=== Active routes ===
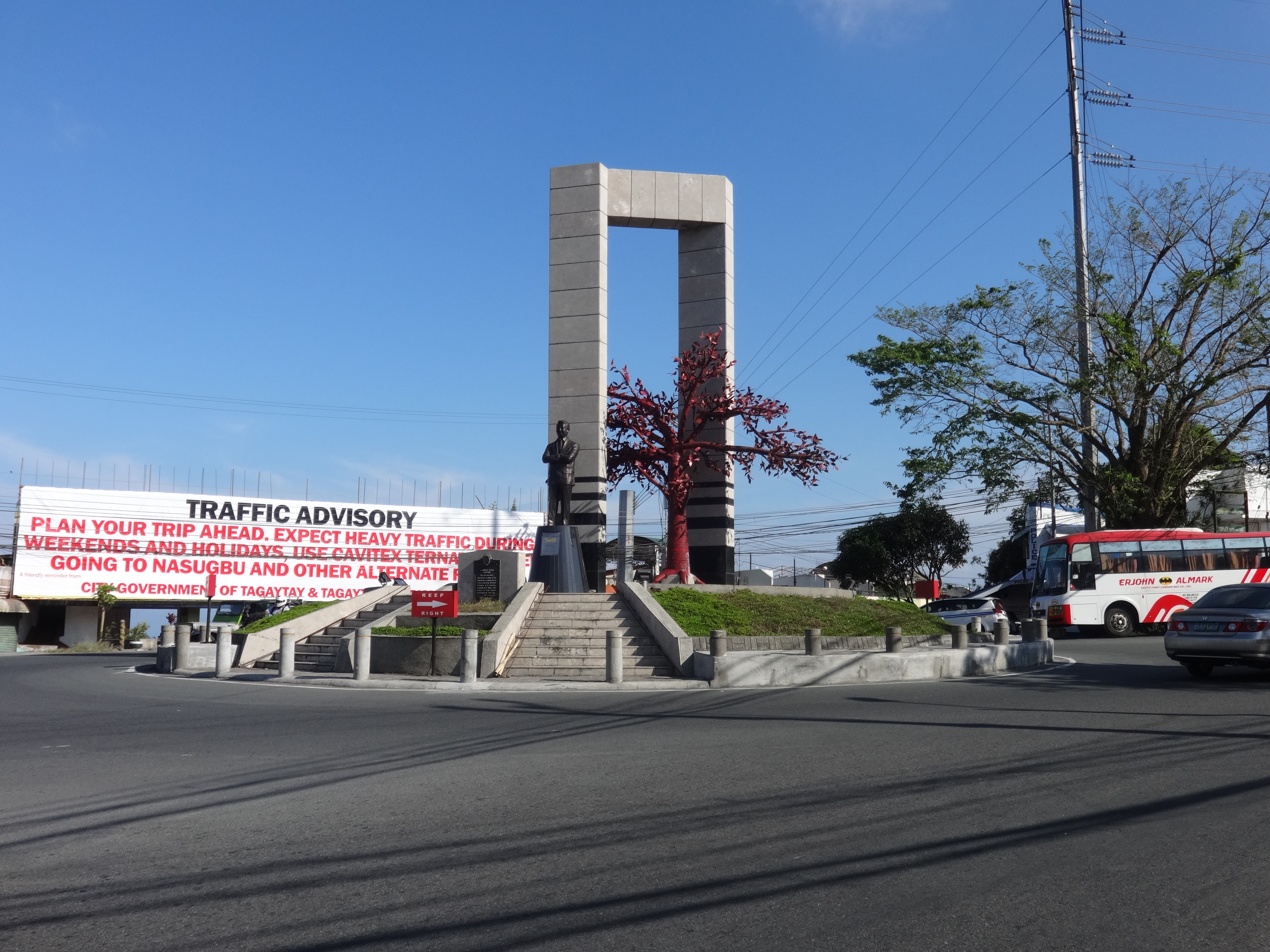
A South Point Carrier bus operated by Erjohn & Almark in Tagaytay Rotonda, 2017

- Bacoor/Imus
- Dasmariñas/General Trias – Ayala, Makati/PITX
- General Mariano Alvarez (GMA) – PITX
- Lian/Mendez/Nasugbu – Lawton, Manila/PITX
- Mendez/Silang/Tagaytay – Ayala via Buendia/PITX
- Silang/Tagaytay - Lawton/PITX

=== Inactive routes ===
- Alabang to Plaza Lawton (now under Saint Rose Transit)
- Indang to Baclaran via Quirino Avenue
- Mendez to Mandaluyong via EDSA
- PITX - Monumento as EDSA Carousel
- Ternate to Vito Cruz via Baclaran (now under Saint Anthony of Padua)

== See also ==
- List of bus companies of the Philippines
- San Agustin Transport
- Tas Group of Companies
- TAS Trans
