= 1.1 =

1.1 may refer to:

- 1.1.1.1, a Domain Name System service
- 1.1-inch/75-caliber gun
- Falcon 9 v1.1 orbital launch vehicle
- Trabant 1.1, an automobile
- A one-day Category 1 race in the UCI race classifications system
- A software version number, including:
  - HTTP 1.1, a version of the Hypertext Transfer Protocol first published in 1997
  - SAML 1.1, a version of Security Assertion Markup Language ratified in 2003

== See also ==
- 11 (disambiguation)
- 1:1 (disambiguation)
- 1+1 (disambiguation)
