= One-way =

One-way or one way may refer to:

- One-way traffic, a street either facilitating only one-way traffic, or designed to direct vehicles to move in one direction
- One-way travel, a trip that does not return to its origin

== Music ==
- One Way (American band), American R&B-funk band popular from late 1970s through the 1980s
- One Way (South Korean band), South Korean R&B/hip hop group managed by YJ Media

=== Albums ===
- One Way (Tamela Mann album), 2016
- One Way (Selwyn album), 2004
- One Way (Turbo album), 1992
- One Way of Life, the Best of the Levellers

=== Songs ===
- "One way" (Sid song), 2009
- "One Way", a song by Dierks Bentley from his 2018 album The Mountain
- "One Way", a single by The Levellers from their 1991 album Levelling the Land
- "One Way", a song by 6lack from his 2016 album Free 6lack
- "One Way", a song by Loona yyxy from their 2018 EP Beauty & the Beat
- "One Way", a song by Thelma Aoyama from her 2008 album Diary
- "One Way", a song by Twenty One Pilots from their 2025 album Breach

== Other uses ==
- One Way (2006 film), a film by Reto Salimbeni
- One Way (2022 American film), an American action thriller
- One Way (2022 Indian film), an Indian Tamil-language drama film
- One-Way (novel) (French Un aller simple), a 1994 novel by French writer Didier Van Cauwelaert
- One-way function, a function that is easy to compute on every input, but hard to invert given the image of a random input
- One-way encryption, in computer science
- One-way mirror, a glass through which one can see only from one side
- One Way Sport, a sportswear brand
- Check valve, also a one-way valve
- Single-use, or disposable products

== See also ==
- One Way or Another (disambiguation)
- One-to-one (disambiguation)
- One-to-many (disambiguation)
