= 1-1 =

1-1 is a mathematical expression that evaluates to:

- 0 (number) (in ordinary arithmetic)

The term 1-1 may refer to:

- New Year's Day, a public holiday in many countries, held annually on the first of January
- Schweizer SGP 1-1, an American glider design
- World 1-1, the first level of Nintendo's Super Mario Bros.

== See also ==
- 1:1 (disambiguation)
- 1+1 (disambiguation)
- One-to-one (disambiguation)
