= Don Aldrin Transport =

Bus company in the Philippines

Don Aldrin Transport Inc.

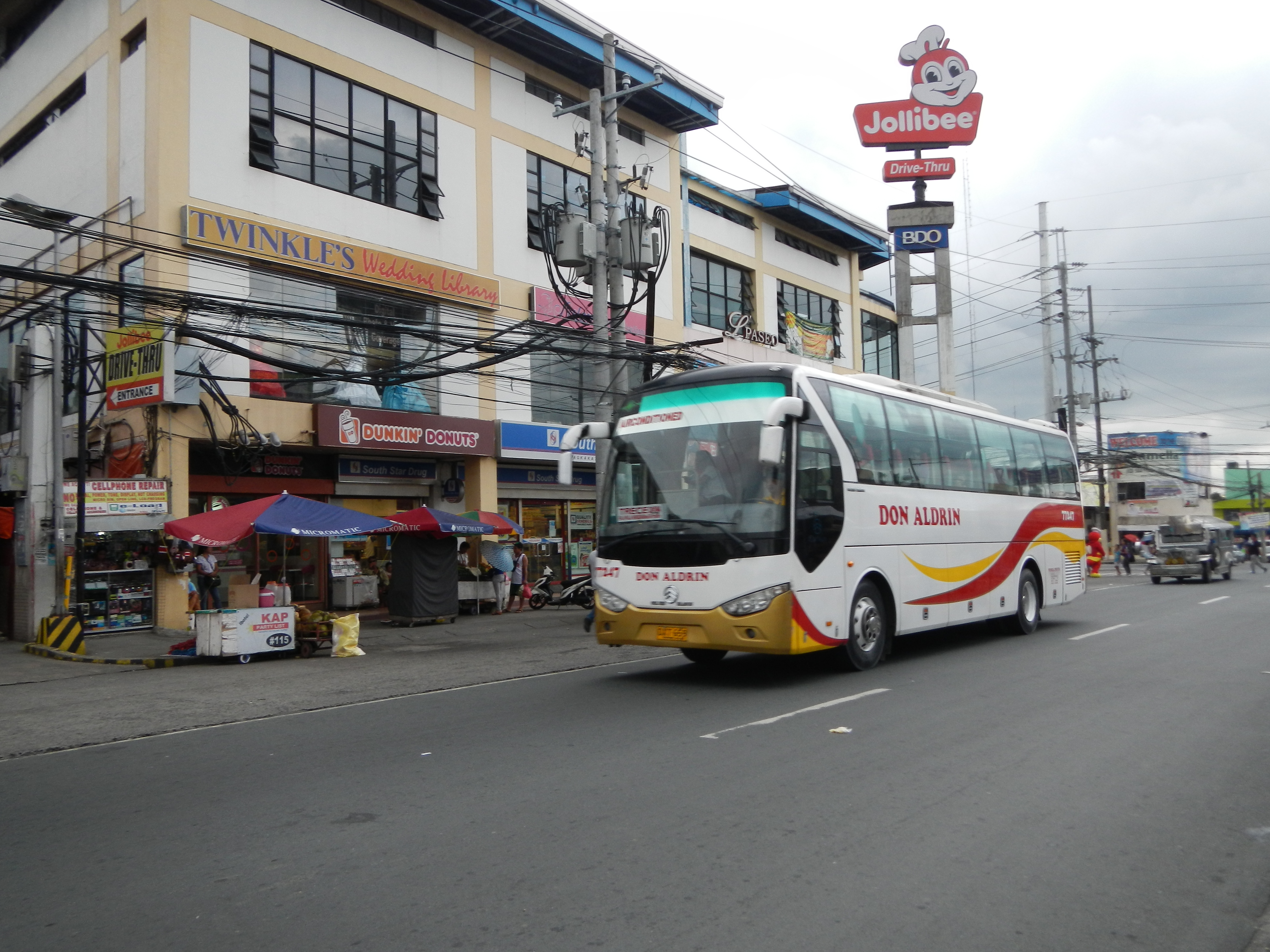
- Don Aldrin 77247, 2013
- Founded: 2008
- Headquarters: Indang, Cavite
- Service area: Cavite • Metro Manila
- Service type: Bus
- Routes: 4
- Destinations: Bacoor; Dasmariñas; Imus; Indang; Makati; Parañaque; Pasay; Trece Martires
- Hubs: Indang
- Depots: Indang; Pasay; Trece Martires
- Operator: Don Aldrin Transport Inc. Metro Coastal Transport Inc.
- Website: www.donaldrintransportinc.com

Don Aldrin Transport Inc. is a provincial bus company based in Indang, Cavite, Philippines.

Don Aldrin Transport is operated as part of Metro Coastal Transport Inc. (MCTI).

== History ==
Don Aldrin Transport's operations began in 2008 with four acquired units from Celyrosa Express, a bus line plies from Indang and Calatagan to Pasay.

In 2011, the ownership of the company was transferred from Don Aldrin Transport to Don Aldrin Transport, Inc., a family-owned corporation that later acquired Jethro Liner in 2012, thus adding Plaza Lawton, Manila as authorized route.

On August 6, 2013, all provincial buses from Cavite and Batangas including those operated by Don Aldrin Transport Inc. were restricted from entering beyond Parañaque City as part of the government’s integrated terminal scheme. The Southwest Integrated Transport Terminal (SITT) at Coastal Mall which became their designated end-points.

During the pandemic Don Aldrin applied and granted to have a Special Permit with Route 27: PITX–Trece Martires, which was later assigned to route 31 in 2024 and in 2025 as Trece Martires–One Ayala.

In May 2025, Don Aldrin, along with Parañaque Integrated Terminal Exchange or PITX, One Ayala Terminal and other major transport operators, including Erjohn & Almark, and Saulog Transit joined the "Drayberks: Ready 4 Safety" campaign, an initiative aimed at promoting road safety awareness among commercial drivers traveling along the CALAX and CAVITEX networks.

On August 20, 2025, seven people were injured in a road collision along Gen. Emilio Aguinaldo Highway in Barangay Anabu I-D, Imus City, Cavite, after a Don Aldrin bus rear-ended an Erjohn & Almark passenger bus at around 12:40 p.m., according to the Imus City police; among the injured was the driver of the Don Aldrin bus, and emergency responders from the Imus City Police Traffic Management Unit, the City Disaster Risk Reduction and Management Office, and barangay officials provided first aid before the victims were transported to the Ospital ng Imus and South Imus Specialist Hospital, with authorities continuing to investigate the cause of the crash.

== Issues and criticisms ==
In August 2017, the Metropolitan Manila Development Authority (MMDA) shut down two erring bus terminals in Pasay City and impounded nine out-of-line buses from Don Aldrin as part of its enforcement operations against unauthorized and traffic-obstructing transport activities. According to the report, one Don Aldrin bus bound for Cavite was already carrying passengers and was allowed to continue operating. The MMDA said operators would be fined ₱6,000 to reclaim their impounded buses.

== Routes ==
=== Active routes ===
- Trece Martires City and Indang to PITX, Pasay, Ayala, Makati

=== Inactive routes ===
- Trece Martires and Indang to Plaza Lawton
- General Mariano Alvarez to Ayala, Makati
- Naic to Baclaran/PITX

== See also ==
- List of bus companies of the Philippines
