= One Too Many =

One Too Many may refer to:

- One Too Many (1951 film)
- One Too Many (1916 film), starring Oliver Hardy
- One Too Many (2022 film), 2022 Nigerian film
- "One Too Many" (song), by Keith Urban and Pink
- One 2 Many, a Norwegian band
- "1, 2 Many", a song by Luke Combs from his album What You See Is What You Get

== See also ==
- One-to-many (disambiguation)
