= One-to-one =

One-to-one or one to one may refer to:

== Mathematics and communication ==
- One-to-one function, also called an injective function
- One-to-one correspondence, also called a bijective function
- One-to-one (communication), the act of an individual communicating with another
- One-to-one (data model), a relationship in a data model
- One to one computing (education), an initiative for a computer for every student
- One-to-one marketing or personalized marketing, an attempt to make a unique product offering for each customer

== Music ==
- One to One (band), a 1980s Canadian pop music group
- One to One (Carole King album), 1982
- One to One (Christine Fan album), 2005
- One to One (Howard Jones album), 1986
- One to One (Syreeta album), 1977
- One to One (Ed Bruce album), 1981
- "One to One" (Freeez song)
- "One to One" (Joe Jackson Band song)

== Other uses ==
- One to One (Apple), Apple's personal training service
- One 2 One, a defunct British mobile telecommunications company, which became T-Mobile UK
- One to One (TV series), an Irish TV series
- One to One: John & Yoko, a 2024 film about John Lennon and Yoko Ono

== See also ==
- 1:1 (disambiguation)
- 1-1 (disambiguation)
- One-to-many (disambiguation)
- Many-to-many
- One on One (disambiguation)
- One-way (disambiguation)
