= 1:1 =

1:1 may refer to:

- 1:1 aspect ratio (image), the square format
- 1:1 pixel mapping, a video display technique
- 1:1, a film by Richard Reeves (2001)
- Koenigsegg One:1, a model of the Koenigsegg Agera sports car

== Mathematics ==
- 1:1 Scale (ratio)
- 1:1 line in a 2-dimensional Cartesian coordinates is an identity line

== Religion ==
- Genesis 1:1
- John 1:1
- Matthew 1:1

== See also ==
- 1-1 (disambiguation)
- 1+1 (disambiguation)
- One-to-one (disambiguation)
