= One and One Is One =

One and One Is One may refer to:

- One and One Is One (song), a 1973 song by Medicine Head
- One and One Is One (album), a 1999 album by Joi
- One Plus One Is One, a 2004 album by Badly Drawn Boy

== See also ==
- 1+1 (disambiguation), i.e., one-and-one
