= Point-to-point =

Point-to-point, point to point, or port to port may refer to:

== Technology ==
- Point-to-point construction, an electronics assembly technique
- Point-to-Point Protocol (PPP), part of the Internet protocol suite
- Point-to-point (telecommunications), a telecommunications link connecting two nodes
- Fibre Channel point-to-point, a simple connection topology

== Transportation ==
- Point-to-point transit, a route structure common among low-fare airlines
- Premium Point-to-Point Bus Service, an express bus service in the Philippines

== Other uses ==
- Point-to-point (steeplechase), a form of horse racing over fences, practiced by hunting horses and amateur riders
- "Point to Point", a song by Animals as Leaders from their self-titled debut album, 2009

== See also ==
- Peer-to-peer
