= One Way or Another (disambiguation) =

"One Way or Another" is a song by Blondie, later covered by One Direction as "One Way or Another (Teenage Kicks)".

One Way or Another may also refer to:

- One Way...Or Another, Cactus album
- "One Way or Another" (Uriah Heep song)
- One Way or Another Productions, a New York based production company whose credits include Uptown
- One Way or Another (TV series), a Spanish television series (original title: Por H o por B)
- One Way or Another (film), a 1974 Cuban romantic drama film by Sara Gómez
