= Jasper Jean =

City bus company in the Philippines

Jasper Jean Bus Liner
- Headquarters: Dasmariñas
- Service area: Metro Manila; Cavite
- Service type: Bus
- Routes: 3
- Destinations: Bacoor; Caloocan; Dasmariñas; General Mariano Alvarez; Imus; Makati; Mandaluyong; Parañaque; Pasay; Quezon City
- Hubs: Dasmariñas
- Depots: Dasmariñas
- Operator: Jasper Jean Liner Inc. or Jasper Jean Services, Inc.

Jasper Jean Liner Inc. or Jasper Jean Services, Inc. (JJSI) is a Philippine bus company operating primarily in Cavite and Metro Manila, known for routes like Dasmariñas to PITX or Navotas via EDSA.

== History ==
Jasper Jean Services, Incorporated (JJSI) began operations with a single bus in early 2000s and initially relied on entrepreneurial management despite having limited experience in the transport industry. After two years of steady operations, additional capital from business partners enabled the company to expand its fleet to 18 units within a year. JJSI subsequently secured the necessary permits to extend its routes, including services from Dasmariñas, Cavite to Baclaran and Navotas via EDSA.

In March 2020, at the onset of the COVID-19 pandemic and the implementation of enhanced community quarantine measures, Jasper Jean Bus Liner was among the bus companies that provided free rides to stranded commuters and essential workers, an initiative later acknowledged by Malacañang as part of the "bayanihan" efforts of private transport operators.

In May 2020, Jasper Jean Liner Inc. and Jasper Jean Services Inc. became operators of the EDSA Carousel under the Mega Manila Consortium Corporation, deploying its low-entry bus units that were previously assigned to the Dasmariñas–Navotas route.

In June 2020, Jasper Jean Bus Liner have resumed daily trips after nearly three months of lockdown due to COVID-19, according to its president, Edwin Costes. The company operates on a limited scope as it has to follow a new route from Dasmariñas City in Cavite to the Parañaque Integrated Terminal Exchange. The new route is only half of its previous one that extended up to Navotas City in Metro Manila.

In 2021, the company continued its public service efforts during the pandemic by deploying buses for healthcare workers. According to the Department of Transportation (DOTr), over 2.1 million free rides were provided to medical frontliners through participating bus firms, including Jasper Jean.

In December 2021, Jasper Jean Liner Inc. supported the launch of the "Light the World with Love" Christmas campaign in the Philippines by assisting in the transport and display of campaign materials during the event's rollout in Manila.

In 2024, Jasper Jean Services was listed among the sponsors and partners associated with the Highlands Ladies Cup, a golf tournament held in the Philippines.

In May 2025, Jasper Jean Services, along with Parañaque Integrated Terminal Exchange, One Ayala Terminal and other major transport operators, including Erjohn & Almark, and Saulog Transit joined the "Drayberks: Ready 4 Safety" campaign, an initiative aimed at promoting road safety awareness among commercial drivers traveling along the CALAX and Cavitex networks.

== Issues and criticisms ==
In May 2015, a Jasper Jean Services bus was involved in a three-vehicle collision along the Manila–Cavite Expressway (CAVITEX) in Las Piñas involving a passenger jeepney and a Saulog Transit bus, leaving 28 people injured. According to traffic authorities, the incident began after the jeepney abruptly slowed down due to a rear tire blowout on the northbound lane, causing the Saulog bus behind it to collide with the vehicle. A Jasper Jean bus driven by Federico Gemone was also involved after attempting to avoid the accident scene by moving to another lane.

In July 2016, the driver and conductor of a Jasper Jean bus were suspended after a video circulated online showing a passenger falling from the vehicle and nearly being run over. According to the passenger, the conductor allegedly hurried him as he was alighting from the bus, which contributed to the incident.

In April 2017, an improvised explosive device was discovered inside a Manila-bound Jasper Jean bus in Cavite. Authorities safely removed the device, and no passengers were harmed. An investigation was launched to determine those responsible for the incident.

On May 30, 2024, two buses involving Jasper Jean and San Agustin Transport collided near PITX in Parañaque City. No one was reported injured.

== Routes ==
=== Cavite ===
- Bacoor
- Dasmariñas
- General Mariano Alvarez
- Imus
- Noveleta / Tanza / Lancaster New City
- Pasay
- PITX
- Silang

=== EDSA Carousel ===
- Mandaluyong
- MOA
- Monumento, Caloocan
- Pasay
- PITX
- Quezon City

=== Others ===
- Ayala to Alabang

== See also ==
- EDSA Carousel
- List of bus companies of the Philippines
