= Tambunting =

Filipino pawnshop

Tambunting Pawnshop
- Type: Private
- Industry: Pawnshop; Bills Payment; Loading Services
- Founded: 1906; 120 years ago
- Founder: Don Ildefonso Tan Bunting
- Headquarters: Makati, Philippines
- Number of locations: 1000+ (as of 2019)
- Area served: Philippines
- Parent: JPT Central Corporate Holding & Management Corporation
- Website: www.tambunting.ph

Tambunting Pawnshop is the oldest pawnshop in the Philippines, operating since 1906. Tambunting Pawnshop's core business is lending money against jewelry and personal property, such as gadgets and appliances, as well as real estate mortgages and stock pledges. Loans are generally granted for a maximum term of six months. After that, the collateral may be sold at auction or through the company’s other jewelry outlets. Tambunting Pawnshop reached its centennial in 2006 and celebrated its 110th anniversary in 2016.

== History ==
Tambunting Pawnshop was established by Don Ildefonso Tan Bunting in 1906.

After years of continuous expansion in his business, Don Ildefonso Tan Bunting tried the shipping business, and later started up the original pawnshop in the town of Santa Cruz, Manila with the name "Casa Agencia de Empeños de Ildefonso Tam Bunting".

By the time of World War II, his pawnshop had expanded to different locations inside and outside Metro Manila. By the 1990s, the newer generation of the Tambunting family already operated more than 300 branches nationwide. As of 2019, Tambunting Pawnshop already has more than 1000 branches nationwide and is still expanding.
