= One-to-many =

One-to-many may refer to:

- Fat link, a one-to-many link in hypertext
- Multivalued function, a one-to-many function in mathematics
- One-to-many (data model), a type of relationship and cardinality in systems analysis
- Point-to-multipoint communication, communication which has a one-to-many relationship
- A one to many relation, a relation such that at least one element of its domain is assigned to more than one elements of its codomain, and no element of its codomain is assigned to more than one element of its domain

== See also ==
- Cardinality (data modeling)
- Multicast
- One Too Many (data modeling)
- One-to-one (disambiguation)
- Point-to-point (disambiguation)
