= Beep (smart card) =

Contactless smart card used in the Philippines

beep™
- Location: Metro Manila
- Launched: July 20, 2015; 11 years ago
- Technology: MIFARE DESFire EV1; MIFARE Ultralight C; NFC
- Operator: AF Payments Inc.
- Manager: AF Payments Inc.
- Currency: PHP (₱10,000 maximum load)
- Credit expiry: 4 years
- Validity: Rail: LRT Line 1 LRT Line 2 MRT Line 3 Bus: BGC Bus Public transport bus systems in Metro Manila
- Retailed: Rail stations; Bus stations; Intermodal terminals; Convenience stores and kiosks
- Website: beep.com.ph

Regular Beep card (left) and concessionary card for senior citizens (right)

Beep (stylized in lowercase) is a reloadable contactless smart card created in 2015 to be a replacement for the magnetic card-based system in paying rail-based rapid transit transportation fares in and around Metro Manila. Beep is also used in lieu of cash in some convenience stores and other businesses. The Beep system is implemented and operated by AF Payments Incorporated, which is primarily owned by Ayala Corporation and Metro Pacific Investments Corporation.

== Overview ==
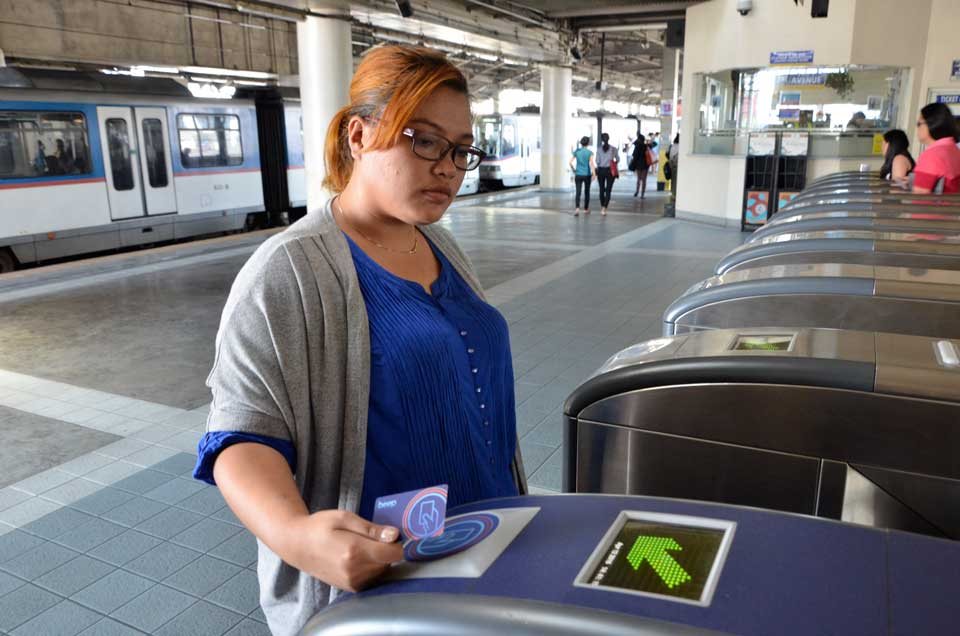
A woman uses a Beep card to exit the loading/unloading area of an MRT Line 3 station.

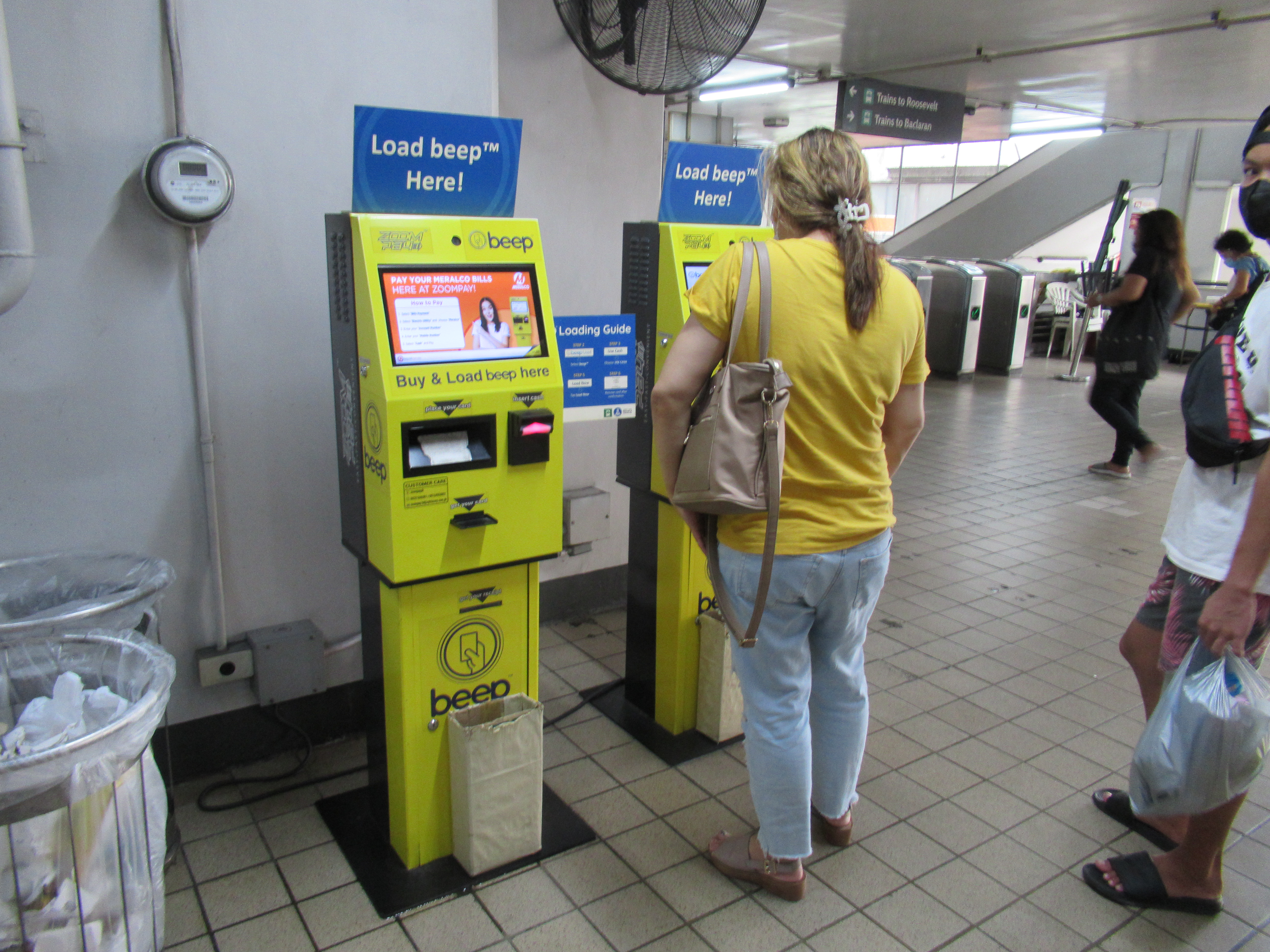
A Beep card loading machine at Carriedo station

The Beep payment system is implemented and operated by AF Payments Incorporated, which is a joint venture of Ayala Corporation and Metro Pacific Investments Corporation.

The system makes use of a reloadable contactless smart card of the same name. Each card can store a value of up to ₱10,000. Beep cards can be used to travel through the Manila railway lines such as the LRT Line 1, LRT Line 2, and MRT Line 3, select bus lines, and to pay for toll fees on the CAVITEX and NLEX roads. They can also be used as a mode of payment at FamilyMart stores through the tap-to-pay system. Aside from at FamilyMart outlets and MRT and LRT stations, Beep cards can be reloaded at Bayad Centers, SM Bills Payment Centers, Villarica Pawnshops, and Tambunting outlets, BPI Mobile app, and the Coins.ph app for NFC-enabled devices. Some third-party loading partners are charging convenience fee ranging from ₱5.00 to ₱20.00 per transaction.

== History ==
=== Background ===
The old automated fare collection system made the use of magnetic cards. Since 2006, plans to upgrade the fare system in the MRT Line 3 have been laid. It experimented RFID technology as an alternative ticketing system to the magnetic cards. However, it was phased out by 2009.

=== Development ===
In 2012, the Department of Transportation and Communications (DOTC), the predecessor to the Department of Transportation (DOTr), announced a plan to bid out a ten-year contract for a common ticketing system for Line 1, Line 2, and Line 3.

AF Payments was one of the bidders for the project, along with SM Investments. AF Payments was awarded the contract in January 2014, and the concession agreement was signed on March 31, 2014.

By August 5, 2015, all stations of Line 1 and Line 2 were already using beep cards. A unified ticketing system for all elevated rail lines in Metro Manila was completed when the beep card system became available to use in all stations of the MRT Line 3 line on October 3, 2015.

In June 2017, Bonifacio Global City (BGC) Bus and AF Payments Inc. rolled out the use of beep card system in bus operations. The new beep card for BGC Bus replaces the TapBGC stored value cards.

AF Payments and FamilyMart secured a partnership which allowed the reloading of beep cards in FamilyMart outlets starting December 7, 2016. It also allowed patrons of the convenient store to make purchases using the smart card. AF Payments also planned to secure similar deals with 7-Eleven and Uncle John's (formerly Ministop).

In partnership with GCash, it became the first QR code transport ticketing system in the country on October 15, 2019 with BGC Bus and Cebu's Topline Express Ferries being the first to adopt the system for passengers’ payment through the GCash mobile app.

== Reception ==
AF Payments Inc. announced in March 2017 that it has sold 3 million beep cards, mostly to riders of LRT and MRT since it began the system's operations in 2015. It claimed that about 60 percent of MRT and LRT riders used Beep cards to pay their train travel expenses while the rest used the standard single-journey tickets. As of November 2018, more than five million cards have been sold and the company expects user growth at 1% to 2% annually. It was able to monitor one billion transactions on the year 2018, and plans to boost further by rolling out more payment services mostly in the transportation sector.

== Plans ==
There are proposals to implement the system outside of Metro Manila and Cebu. The Southern Mindanao Bus Operators Association (SMBOA) is proposing the use of a Beep card at Davao City. SMBOA president Jerry Sy made the suggestion during their board meeting. He also urged them to introduce the technology to other bus companies.

A private firm is eyeing to partner with jeepney cooperatives in Bukidnon province and the cities of Iloilo for their jeepneys in support of the Public Utility Vehicle Modernization Program (PUVMP) in the country. Peter Maher, president and chief executive officer of AF Payments Inc., said the initiative is part of the expansion outside Metro Manila. The company is also looking to integrate the beep card system with the under-construction MRT Line 7, Metro Manila Subway, North–South Commuter Railway and the Philippine National Railways (PNR) Bicol projects.

== Controversy ==
- On October 1, 2020, the "No beep card, no ride" policy was implemented in the EDSA Busway to minimize physical contact between commuters and public transport personnel to reduce their risk of getting COVID-19 and to pave way for more seamless and faster transactions to trim down the queuing of passengers. The new policy drew flak from commuters due to the current price of the card and its immediate implementation. Within the first week of its implementation, the Department of Transportation (DOTr) suspended the mandatory use of beep cards after AF Payments Incorporated refused the government's request to waive the ₱80.00 costs of beep cards.
- In August 2022, the Department of Transportation warned of an impending supply shortage of beep cards, influenced by events such as the Russian invasion of Ukraine and COVID-19-related logistics issues. The agency is looking for solutions to the supply problem.

== See also ==
- RFID
- List of smart cards
