= 1+1 =

1+1 is a mathematical expression that evaluates to:

- 2 (number) (in ordinary arithmetic)
- 1 (number) (in Boolean algebra with a notation where '+' denotes a logical disjunction)
- 0 (number) (in Boolean algebra with a notation where '+' denotes 'exclusive or' operation, or in a quotient ring of numbers modulo 2)

The terms 1+1, One Plus One, or One and One may refer to:

== 1+1 ==
- 1 + 1 + 1 + 1 + ⋯, a mathematical divergent series
- 1+1 (TV channel), a Ukrainian TV channel
- 1+1 (Grin album), 1972
- 1+1 (Herbie Hancock and Wayne Shorter album), 1997
- "1+1" (Beyoncé song), 2011
- "1+1" (Sia song), 2021
- "1+1", a 2021 song by the South Korean group Pentagon from Love or Take

== One Plus One ==
- OnePlus One, an Android smartphone
- One Plus One, original title of Jean-Luc Godard's 1968 film Sympathy for the Devil
- One Plus One, 2002 graphic novel published by Oni Press
- One Plus One (TV programme), a weekly interview show aired by ABC in Australia

== One and One ==
- One and One (musical), an American 1970s off-Broadway musical comedy (also known as One & One)
- "One and One" (song), written by Billy Steinberg, Rick Nowels and Marie-Claire D'Ubaldo and notably covered by Robert Miles feat. Maria Nayler
- "One and One (Ain't I Good Enough)", a 1987 song by Wa Wa Nee
- One-and-one, a type of free throw in basketball
- Fish and chips, in Dublin slang

== Other ==
- 1&1 AG, a German telecom company
- 1 and 1 (SHINee album), a 2016 reissue of their album 1 of 1

== See also ==
- One and One Is One (disambiguation)
- One Plus One Is One, a 2004 album by Badly Drawn Boy
- One on One (disambiguation)
- One by One (disambiguation)
