= Premium Point-to-Point Bus Service =

Express road transit service in Metro Manila

Premium P2P Bus Service

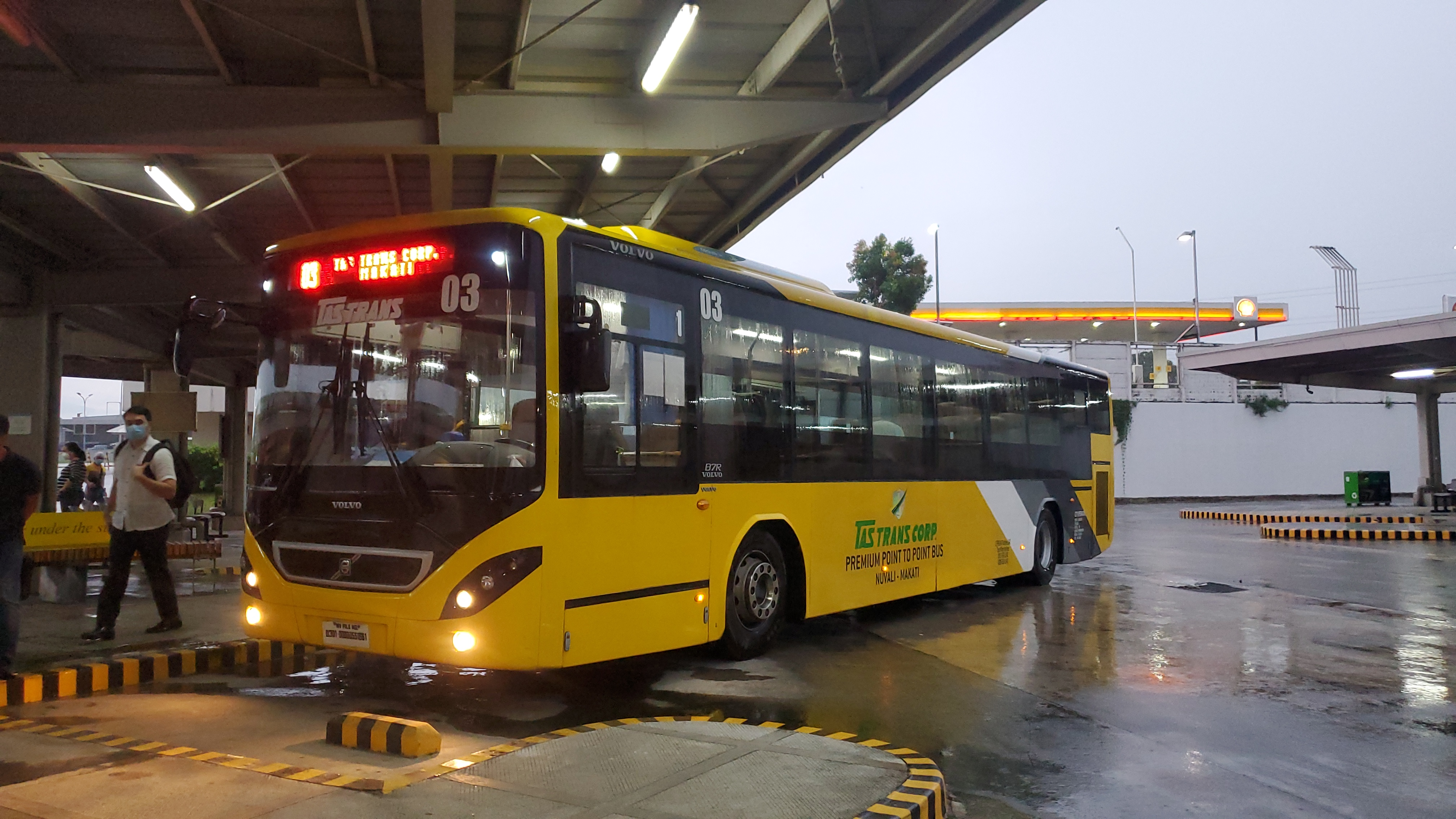
- A P2P bus parked at Nuvali Transport Terminal in Santa Rosa, Laguna

Overview
- Locale: Metro Manila; Metro Cebu; Iloilo City; Central Luzon; Baguio
- Transit type: Express bus
- Number of stations: 52
- Website: p2pbus.ph

Operation
- Began operation: March 2015
- Operators: Various private firms in partnership with the Land Transportation Franchising and Regulatory Board and, in Metro Manila, the Metropolitan Manila Development Authority

The Premium Point-to-Point (P2P) Bus Service, formerly known as Express Connect, is an express bus service in the Philippines administered by the Department of Transportation and operated by private bus companies in partnership with the Land Transportation Franchising and Regulatory Board.

Introduced in March 2015, the service was initially available in Metro Manila connecting the city's suburbs to the central business districts, including the Makati CBD, Ortigas Center and Bonifacio Global City. In February 2016, the express bus service to Ninoy Aquino International Airport was launched with the franchise awarded to Air Freight 2100 (UBE Express). The service runs 24 hours a day with scheduled stops at the SM Mall of Asia, Entertainment City and the Makati CBD. In September 2017, the land transportation board announced services to Clark International Airport in Pampanga with three new routes provided by Genesis Transport.

As of March 2019, the Department of Transportation's premium P2P bus service runs 31 routes across 52 stops in Metro Manila and nearby suburbs in the Greater Manila Area. Services also began operations in the Visayas and other areas in Luzon in the same year.

== Express bus routes ==
In March 2019, the Land Transportation Franchising and Regulatory Board announced the opening of 28 new routes, including new services in Metro Cebu, Iloilo City, and Central Luzon. These routes were launched during the nationwide simultaneous launch of the Public Utility Vehicle Modernization Program (PUVMP) dated July 11, 2019 by this government agency.

=== Baguio ===
Route	Terminals		via	Operator
	Baguio	Parañaque; Parañaque Integrated Terminal Exchange	JAC Liner Kamias Terminal (Northbound); Araneta City Bus Port (Southbound)	Pangasinan Solid North Transit, Inc.

=== Cebu metropolitan area ===
Route	Terminals		via	Operator
	Cebu City	Danao	Mandaue; Consolacion; Liloan; Compostela	Vallacar Transit, Inc.
	Cebu City	Lapu-Lapu	Mandaue	Vallacar Transit, Inc.
	Cebu City	Sibonga	Talisay; Minglanilla; Naga; San Fernando; Carcar	Vallacar Transit, Inc.

=== Central Luzon ===
Route	Terminals		via	Operator
	Clark International Airport	Diliman; Trinoma	Clark Freeport (SM City Clark, DOTR Main Office)	Genesis Transport Service, Inc.
	Clark International Airport	Ortigas Center; Robinsons Galleria	Clark Freeport (SM City Clark, DOTR Main Office)	Genesis Transport Services, Inc.
	Clark International Airport	Ninoy Aquino International Airport; Terminal 3		Genesis Transport Services, Inc
