= Liwasang Bonifacio =

Public square in Ermita, Manila, Philippines

- City square
- {{{other_names}}}
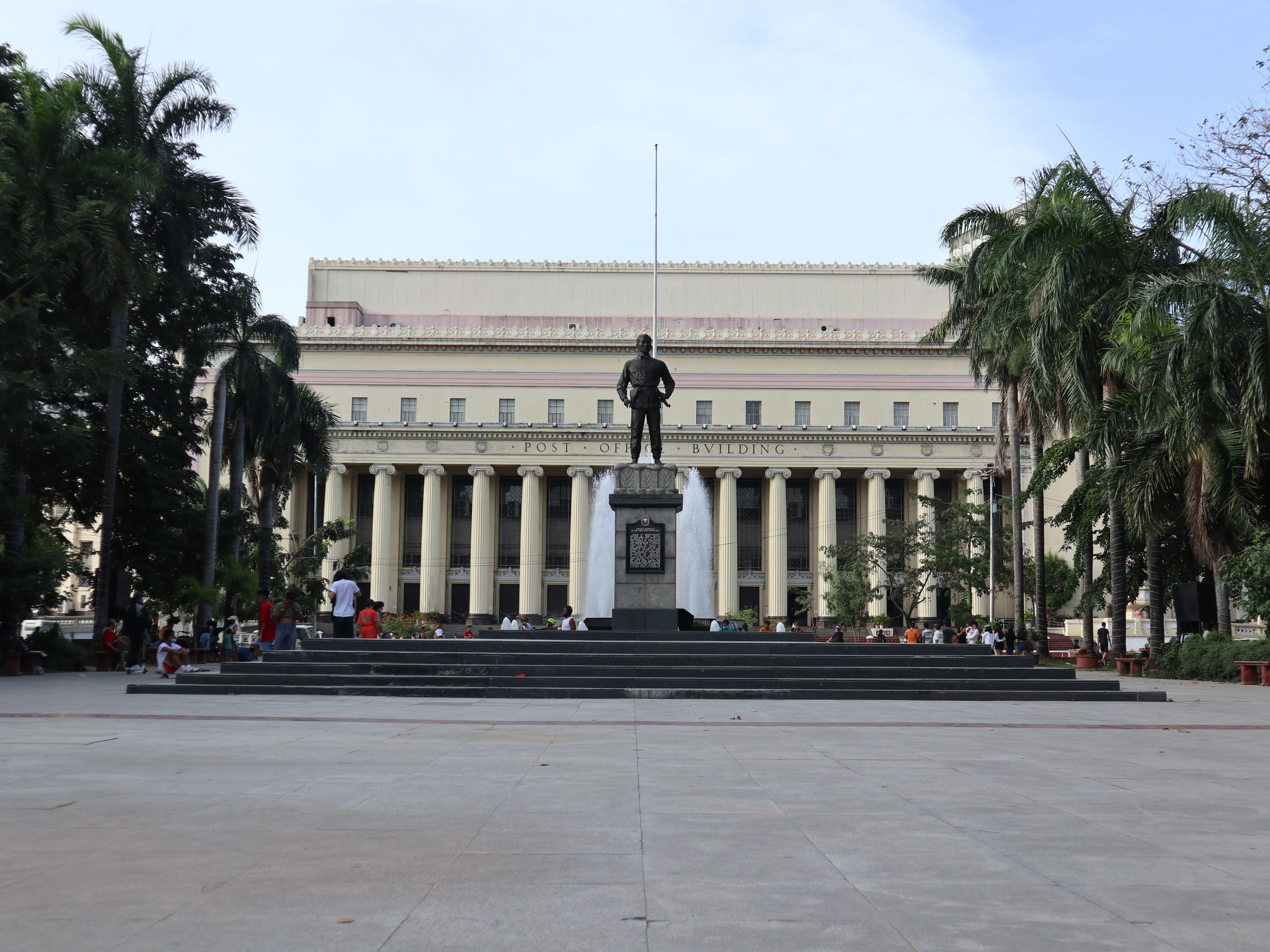
- Liwasang Bonifacio and the Manila Central Post Office. The centre of the plaza is dominated by a bronze statue of Andrés Bonifacio.
- Dedicated to: Andrés Bonifacio
- Owner: City of Manila
- Location: Padre Burgos Avenue and Magallanes Street, Ermita; Manila, Philippines
- Interactive map of Liwasang Bonifacio
- Coordinates: 14°35′40″N 120°58′44″E

The Liwasang Bonifacio (English: Bonifacio Square), formerly known as Plaza Lawton, is a city square and transport hub in front of the Manila Central Post Office in the Ermita district of Manila, Philippines. It is located at the southern end of Jones Bridge, MacArthur Bridge, and Quezon Bridge, which connect the northern districts of Binondo, Santa Cruz, and Quiapo to Ermita. The plaza straddles the boundary between Ermita and Intramuros and marks the eastern terminus of Padre Burgos Avenue, which continues toward Taft Avenue and Roxas Boulevard at Rizal Park.

Historically known as Plaza del Fortín, the plaza was given its current name in 1963 after the revolutionary leader Andrés Bonifacio, founder of the Katipunan independence movement during Spanish colonial rule. A monument in his honor stands at the center of the plaza. The plaza is a popular site for protests and demonstrations organized by several leftist groups. It is one of four designated freedom parks in the City of Manila, where protests and rallies may be held without requiring permission from local authorities.

== History ==
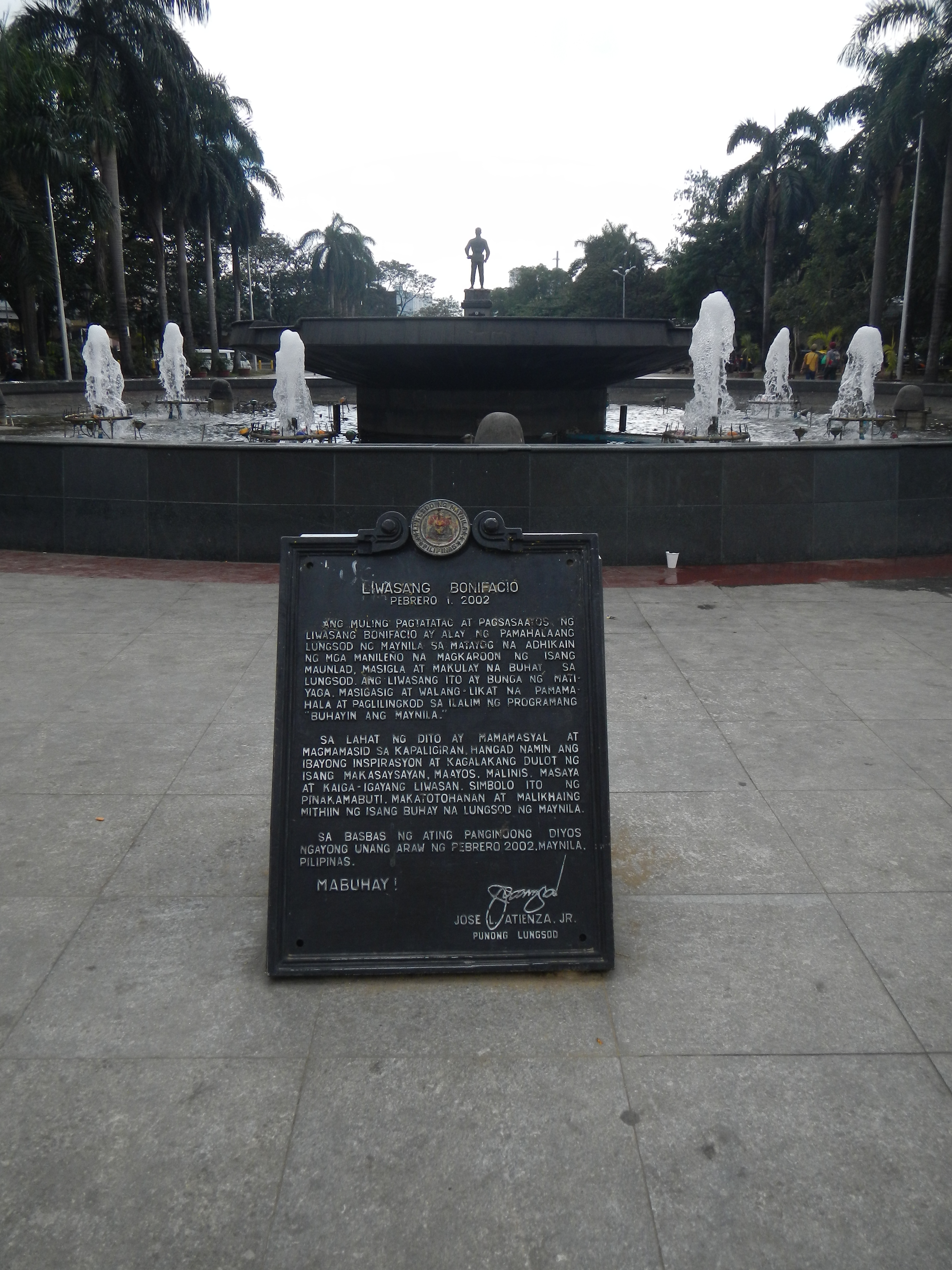
Marker

During the Spanish colonial period, the land currently comprising Liwasang Bonifacio and the Manila Central Post Office was the Cuartel del Fortín, a small fortress guarding the Pasig River east of Fort Santiago. It was located in the early Chinese trading village of Parián right outside the walls of Intramuros before it moved north of the Pasig River to Binondo and Santa Cruz in the late 18th century. El Fortín served as the quarters of a contingent of the Spanish infantry regiment where it is fronted by a small plaza surrounded by stone benches and trees. The Plaza del Fortín also doubled as a public recreation area at night where early residents would gather to hear musical performances. By the late 19th century, the fortress was acquired by the Compañía General de Tabacos de Filipinas and was converted into a factory called the Fabrica del Fortín. It was the largest tobacco factory in the Philippines at the time, employing more than 5,000 labourers. After the Spanish–American War, the factory became the head office of the Bureau of Post and was eventually replaced by the Manila Central Post Office building. The Manila tranvía had a terminal in the plaza, which was then renamed Plaza Lawton after Henry Ware Lawton, the American general killed during the Philippine–American War. A statue of Andres Bonifacio was erected here in 1963, designed by national artist Guillermo Tolentino to commemorate his birth centennial. It was also in 1963 when Plaza Lawton was renamed Liwasang Bonifacio in his memory.

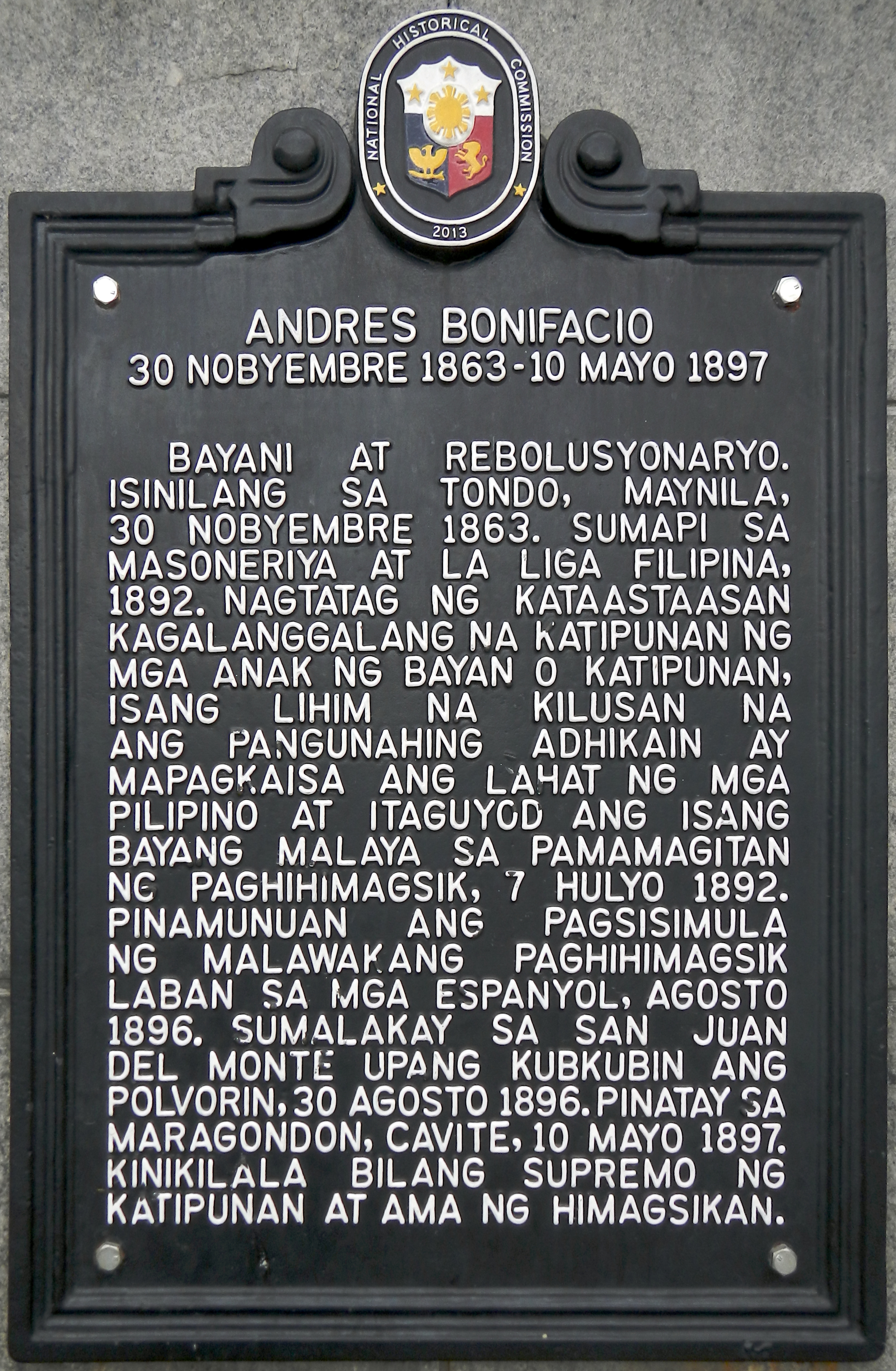
Andres Bonifacio NHCP historical marker in Filipino Language at Liwasang Bonifacio

== See also ==
- Andrés Bonifacio Monument
