= Land Transportation Franchising and Regulatory Board =

Philippine public land transportation government agency

- Lupon sa Prangkisa at Pamamahala ng Transportasyong Panlupa

Agency overview
- Formed: June 19, 1987; 39 years ago
- Jurisdiction: Republic of the Philippines
- Headquarters: East Avenue, Diliman, Quezon City
- Agency executive: Vigor D. Mendoza II, Chairman; Isagani M. Victorio, DPA; Board Member; RAdm. Loumer P. Bernabe, PN (Ret.); Executive Director
- Parent department: Department of Transportation
- Website: http://ltfrb.gov.ph

The Land Transportation Franchising and Regulatory Board (LTFRB; Filipino: Lupon sa Prangkisa at Pamamahala ng Transportasyong Panlupa) is an agency of the Republic of the Philippines under the Department of Transportation (DOTr). The LTFRB was established on June 19, 1987, during the former president Corazon Aquino’s administration.

The LTFRB is responsible for promulgating, administering, enforcing, and monitoring compliance of policies, laws, and regulations of public land transportation services. The agency is in charge of granting franchises or accreditations and regulating public vehicles such as Public Utility Buses (PUBs), Mini-buses, Public Utility Jeepneys (PUJs), Utility Vehicle (UV) Express Services, Filcab service, school services, taxies, Transportation Network Vehicle Services (TNVS), Tourist Transport Services, and For Hire Cargo vehicles except tricycles, pedicabs, and habal-habals.

== History ==
The regulatory land transportation dates back to the early 1900s. The LTFRB therefore, is a product of a series of transformations. The evolutionary progression runs as thus:

=== Coastwise Rate Commission ===
The first iteration of the LTFRB was established on November 17, 1902, through the passing of Act No. 520. The commission is in charge of classifying vessels, merchandise, and passengers in with reference to transportation under the coastwise trade, and fixing the maximum rates to be imposed on the vessels and merchandise of different classes, and people that are being moved from one point to another across the country.

=== Board of Public Utility Commissioners ===
On December 19, 1913, through Act No. 1507, the Supervising Railway Expert was created. The following year would see the creation of the Board of Rate Regulation before these three would be subsumed into the Board of Public Utility Commissioners. The Board of Public Utility Commissioners was patterned after the New Jersey Board of Public Utilities and regulated utilities such as electricity and water in addition to land and coastal transportation.

=== Public Service Commission ===
In 1926, with the implementation of the Public Service Act, the Board was replaced by the Public Service Commission. The commission was given jurisdiction over many forms of public utility and services, which was defined in the Act as any person for hire, any mode of transport, or anything else that fit into the remaining categories listed in the Act.

=== Specialized regulatory boards ===
In September 1972, then President Ferdinand Marcos implemented the Integrated Reorganization Plan through Presidential Decree No. 1. In the implementation of this plan, the Public Service Commission was abolished and its responsibilities distributed among multiple regulatory boards that each focused on a part of the PSC's regulatory function.

=== Land Transportation Commission ===
The Land Transportation Commission was formed in 1964, but it would be renamed in 1979 by former president, Ferdinand Marcos, to the Bureau of Land Transportation. In 1985, the Bureau was combined with the Board of Transportation because it was determined that a number of their functions were similar to the other's. The Board of Transportation was formed as a part of the Integrated Reorganization Plan. The Bureau worked closely with the Board by enforcing the regulations established by it.

From its inception, the Land Transportation Commission held the duty of classifying, registering, and regulating all forms of land-based vehicles. In addition to this, it issued licenses and enforced traffic rules.

=== Land Transportation Franchising and Regulatory Board ===
In 1987, then President Corazon Aquino abolished the LTC, and created two offices to replace it. The Land Transportation Office took on the functions of the Bureau of Land Transportation, and the Land Transportation Franchising and Regulatory Board took on the functions of the Board of Transportation.

== Organizational structure ==
=== Office of the Chairman and the board members ===
The Office of the Chairman and its board members has the capability perform the powers and functions as mandated in Executive Order 202 and Public Service Act. The Board shall have the following powers and functions:

- To prescribe and regulate routes of service, economically viable capacities and zones or areas of operation of public land transportation services provided by motorized vehicles in accordance with the public land transportation development plans and programs approved by the Department of Transportation
- To issue, amend, revise, suspend or cancel Certificates of Public Convenience or permits authorizing the operation of public land transportation services provided by motorized vehicles, and to prescribe the appropriate terms and conditions therefore;
- To determine, prescribe and approve and periodically review and adjust, reasonable fares, rates and other related charges, relative to the operation of public land transportation services provided by motorized vehicles;
- To issue preliminary or permanent injunction, whether prohibitory or mandatory, in all cases in which it has jurisdiction, and in which cases the pertinent provisions of the Rules of Court shall apply;
- To punish for contempt of the Board, both direct and indirect, in accordance with the pertinent provisions of, and the penalties prescribed by, the Rules of Court;
- To issue subpoena and subpoena duces tecum and summon witnesses to appear in any proceedings of the Board, to administer oaths and affirmations;
- To conduct investigations and hearings of complaints for violation of the public service laws on land transportation and of the Board's rules and regulations, orders, decisions and/or rulings and to impose fines and/or penalties for such violations;
- To review motu proprio the decisions/actions of the Regional Franchising and Regulatory Office herein created;
- To promulgate rules and regulations governing proceedings before the Board and the Regional Franchising and Regulatory Office: Provided, That except with respect to paragraphs d, e, f and g hereof, the rules of procedure and evidence prevailing in the courts of laws should not be controlling and it is the spirit and intention of said rules that the Board and the Regional Franchising and Regulatory Offices shall use every and all reasonable means to ascertain facts in its case speedily and objectively and without regard to technicalities of law and procedures, all in the interest of due process;
- To fix, impose and collect, and periodically review and adjust, reasonable fees and other related charges for services rendered;
- To formulate, promulgate, administer, implement and enforce rules and regulations on land transportation public utilities, standards of measurements and/or design, and rules and regulations requiring operators of any public land transportation service to equip, install and provide in their utilities and in their stations such devices, equipment facilities and operating procedures and techniques as may promote safety, protection, comfort and convenience to persons and property in their charges as well as the safety of persons and property within their areas of operations;
- To coordinate and cooperate with other government agencies and entities concerned with any aspect involving public land transportation services with the end in view of effecting continuing improvement of such services; and
- To perform such other functions and duties as may be provided by law, or as may be necessary, or proper or incidental to the purposes and objectives of this Executive Order.

=== Office of the Executive Director ===
The Office of the Executive Director assists the Chairman or the Board Members in the execution and implementation of all laws and policies pertaining to the regulations of land transportation public utilities.

They provide advisement services relative to the economical, efficient, and effective administration of personnel and other resources of the LTFRB.

=== Key officials ===
LTFRB key officials as of June 2026

CHAIRPERSON, BOARD MEMBERS AND EXECUTIVE DIRECTOR
Name	Function
Atty. Vigor D. Mendoza II,	Chairperson
Isagani M. Victorio, DPA	Board Member
Atty. Greg G. Pua Jr.	Board Member
Atty. John Paul Allen M. Victa	Office of the Executive Director

=== Divisions ===
DIVISIONS HEADS
Name	Function	Division
Marissa Paula E. Mamauag	N/A	Information Systems Management Division
Atty. Ralph Aidrin E. Baguio	Officer-In-Charge	Legal Division
Joel J. Bolano	Chief	Technical Division
Nivette Amber M. Pastorite	Chief	Administrative Division
Ma. Angelina Goldamier M. Tamayo, CPA	Chief	Financial and Management Division
Atty. Sherwin D. Vizconde	Chief	Franchise Planning and Monitoring Division

==== Administrative Division ====
- Personal management and development
- General services and other auxiliary services
- Equipment and supplies management
- Administrative records management
- Receipt custody collection and disburse of funds
- Automotive and mechanical services

==== Financial and Management Division ====
- Budget and financial management
- Accounting services
- Audit services

==== Technical Division ====
- Development of financial and economic standards for franchise application
- Assessment of fees, services, and charges
- Issuance of special permit
- Receipt, Evaluation, and Processing of all Franchise applications/petitions
- Enforcement relative to Franchise applications
- Supervision of periodical inspection of units, terminals, and garages

==== Information Systems Management Division ====
- Records management
- Computer services
- Confirmation services
- Planning development
- Data gathering and reporting services
- Issuance of diploma type CPC and sticker services

==== Legal Division ====
- Hearing of application cases
- Legal researchers
- Administrative legal researches
- Adjudication and litigation of violations

==== Regional Franchising and Regulatory Offices ====
- Implement approved policies, plans and programs, rules and regulations of the Board at the regional level
- Hear and decide uncontested applications/petitions for routes, within their respective region
- Coordinate and cooperates with the government agencies and entities concerned with any aspect involving land transportation within the region
- Perform other related functions

== Initiative and projects ==
=== Fare rates ===
The LTFRB is in charge of regulating fares of public vehicles.

In 2003, LTFRB granted fare discounts to senior citizens, persons with disabilities (PWD) and students. The discount is equivalent to 20% of the regular or normal fare. According to the memorandum they issued, this is to give their needs the utmost priority.

=== Anti-colorum campaign ===
The word colorum was first used in an official capacity in 1973 to refer to unauthorized public utility vehicles, when then-president Ferdinand Marcos issued Presidential Decree No. 101, which modified the definitions of public utility vehicles and prescribed the manner in which these should be operated.

The colorum violation was established and prescribed by the Department of Transportation and Communications under the Violations in Connection with Franchise of the Joint Administrative Order No. 2014–01 in 1992. This penalizes motor vehicles operating as colorum, and they are considered as such under the following circumstances:

- A private motor vehicle operating as a PUV but without proper authority from the LTFRB
- A PUV operating outside of its approved route or area without a prior permit from the Board or outside the exceptions provided under existing memorandum
- A PUV operating differently from its authorized denomination (e.g. those approved as school service but operating as UV express, or those approved as tourist bus transport but operating as city or provincial bus); and
- A PUV with suspended or cancelled CPC and the Decision/Order of suspension or cancellation is executory; and
- A PUV with expired CPC and without a pending application for extension of validity timely filed before the Board.

This practice is outlawed on the bases that it unfairly puts up competition to legal public utility vehicles and therefore costs the government fees and taxes. Working against colorum, the LTFRB is authorized to arrest drivers of colorum vehicles and seize their vehicles. The board also has the capacity to shut down the operations of Transport Network Vehicle Services such as Uber, bus operators, and taxis.

In March 2018, the Task Force Kamao, an inter-agency task force, was launched to combat colorum vehicles in the country. Headed by the Transportation Undersecretary and the LTFRB chairman, the campaign aims to conduct anti-colorum operations more effectively by increasing the presence of intelligence in communities. The public may engage in the efforts by reporting colorum vehicles on the Inter-Agency Council for Traffic Facebook page.

=== Public Utility Drivers' Academy Program ===
The LTFRB organized the Public Utility Drivers Academy Program which is a free seminar that aims to inform drivers of basic road safety, driving courtesy, and traffic regulations and regulations. The seminar is composed of four core modules namely anger management, road courtesy, traffic rules, and terms and conditions of a franchise. The program was designed by the LTFRB, LTO, University of the Philippines, and De La Salle University.

=== Regulation of TNVS ===
In October 2014, LTFRB launched a sting operation against Uber for operating as a public vehicle with the lack of a franchise. A few days later, DOTr, then DOTC, urged LTFRB to meet with Uber Executives to discuss terms as they see potential in Uber as a service.

In May 2015, the Philippines became the first country to have regulations on ride sharing.

DOTr gave the duty of regulating fares of TNVS to LTFRB. The TNCS and TNVS are subject to the full regulation and supervision by LTFRB, including but not limited to application and approval/denial of franchise, setting of fares, routes, operating conditions, and imposition of fines, suspension and cancellation of franchise. Uber and Grab was accredited as TNCS in July and August 2015 respectively. The TNCs must screen and accredit their drivers and register them with the LTFRB. Meanwhile, the agency is responsible for the issuance of permits to TNVS drivers - namely the provisional authority (PA), or a temporary permit valid for 45 days, and the Certificate of Public Convenience (CPC) franchise, which is valid for a year.

In July 2016, LTFRB suspended accepting and processing applications of the TNVS of the companies Uber and Grab. This was done in light of the increasing number of applications and after the review done by the agency of the fare scheme being implemented. Both companies continued to accept applications for partner drivers despite the memorandum.

A year later, LTFRB also ordered that the two companies should deactivate drivers who registered in their systems after June 30, 2017 and to also provide them a masterlist of all the drivers that are with them as of the said date. Despite this, Grab and Uber allowed their drivers to operate that still have no licenses or with expired permits. Both companies revealed that they accepted driver's applications to meet the consumer demand. They also said that around 80% of their drivers to not have the required documents that LTFRB insisted on having. This led to LTFRB fining them a penalty of Php 5 million. Grab complied to the order but Uber did not, leading to a suspension of its operation for a month as a penalty. Uber was able to resume its operations after it paid a fine of PHP 190M in exchange of the penalty.

As of July 2018, the TNCs that are given accreditation are Grab, Hirna Mobility Solutions, Hype Transport Systems, Go Lag Incorporated, Micab Systems Corporation, and iPARA Technologies, and Solutions, Inc (the owner of Owto).

=== PUV modernization ===
In June 2017, the Department of Transportation (DOTr) issued the Public Utility Vehicle Modernization Program (PUVMP) or Omnibus Guidelines on the Planning and Identification of Public Road Transportation Services and Franchise Insurance under the Department Order No. 2017-011. The PUVMP is a hallmark program under President Rodrigo Duterte's administration. It aims to restructure, modernize, and employ a well-managed and environmentally sustainable transport sector while ensuring that drivers and operators have stable and sufficient livelihood and that commuters get to commute swiftly, safely, and comfortably.

The basic policy states that the DOTr shall lessen the reliance on the use of private vehicles and transition toward the promotion of mobility solutions and high-quality transportation systems that are environmentally sound. This program shall prioritize the movement of people and goods over vehicles. The department is tasked to disseminate, administer, and oversee the compliance of public land transportation policies, laws, and regulations which promote the basic human need for mobility. LTFRB is assigned to implement this Department Order, to support and reinforce the operators and establish a bigger and coordinate fleet of PUVs. The LTFRB has also the power to incentivize or prioritize the operators with larger fleets of PUVs with higher passenger capacity.

A special loan program with coordination with Land Bank and the Development Bank of the Philippines (DBP) is being proposed to help soften the impact and accommodate the small operators who will be affected by the PUVMP. Various training and social programs shall be given under this program.

A pilot implementation will be conducted by the DOTr, LTFRB, LTO, OTC, and other concerned agencies to review and assess the efficacy and effects of the program's intended outcomes. The program is considered to be revolutionary in terms of road-based public land transportation and that it will steer the country to have an improved riding experience that will be benefited by generations of Filipino passengers.

== LTA proposal ==
House Bill No. 6776 known as Land Transport Act of 2017 was passed to the Congress that proposes the merging of two major transport regulators, namely LTFRB and LTO, into one agency that is the Land Transport Authority. The former was created through E.O. 202 which is meant for regulating public transport vehicles while the latter was created through E.O. 125 and 226 is meant for licensing of drivers and registration of all motor vehicles.

This was passed by House Speaker Pantaleon Alvarez, Cesar V. Sarmiento, Juan Pablo P. Bondoc, Bayani F. Fernando, Anna Katrina M. Enverga, Renato Unico, Winston Castelo, Emi Calixto Rubiano, and Alfred D. Vargas. The reason for this proposal is “create a central agency that will consolidate the functions of the LTO and LTFRB in order to avoid confusion as to which agency is tasked to maintain land transportation law and order in the Philippines.” The proposal of the LTO also seeks to address the need for a more comprehensive transportation policy that considers the “varied and complex areas in the land transportation industry”. Moreover, the explanatory notes states that some existing policies are inadequate, ineffective and already obsolete.

The board of directors of the proposed LTA are composed of the following:

- Chairman with the same rank salary, and privileges of an Undersecretary
- One member of the Board who is a lawyer that has been practicing law for five years in the country
- One with a degree in Public Transportation Planning
- One with a degree in engineering
- One with a degree in management

== See also ==
- Department of Transportation
