= General Mariano Alvarez =

Municipality in Cavite, Philippines

- Municipality
- Municipality of General Mariano Alvarez
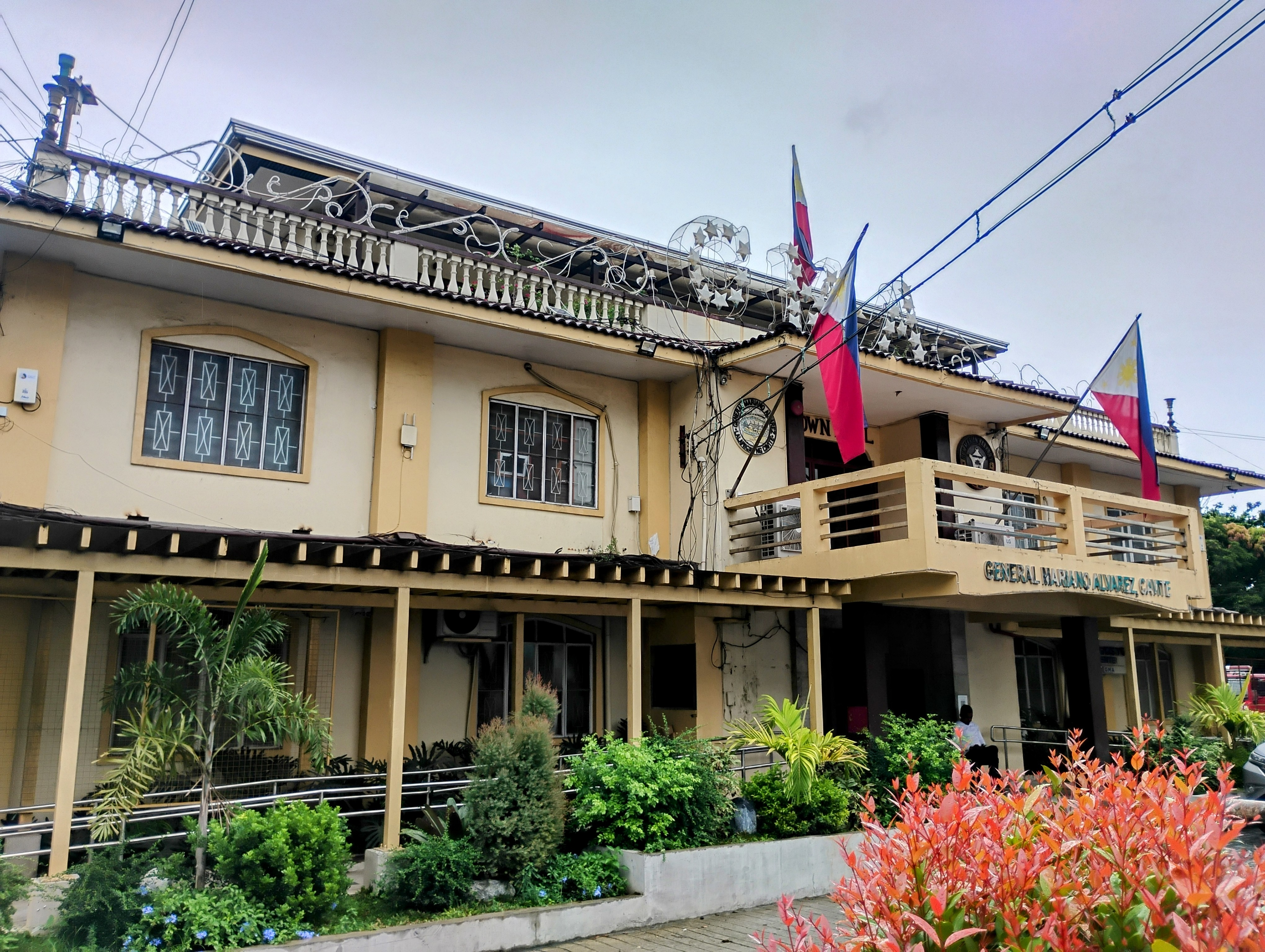
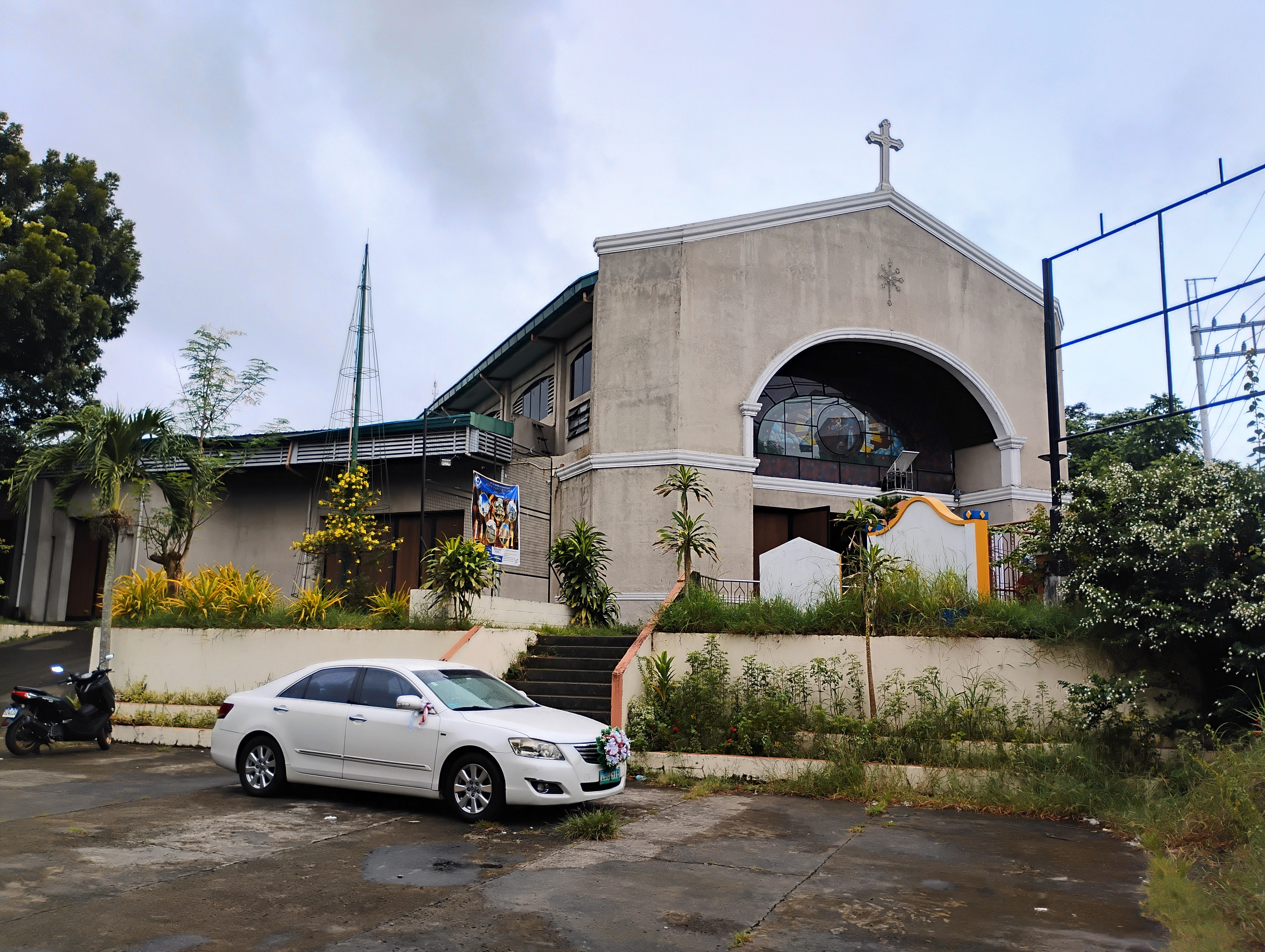
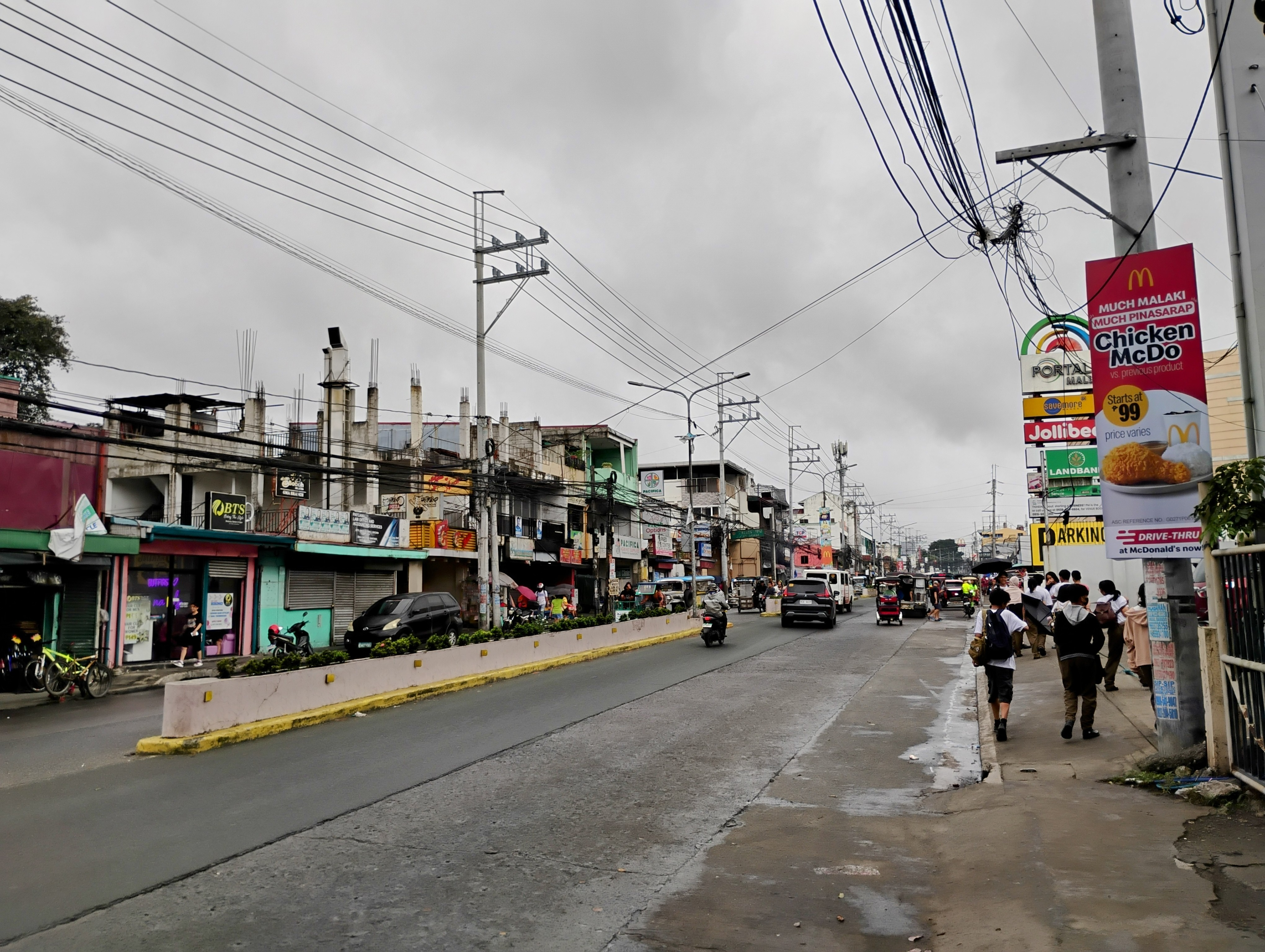
- GMA Municipal Hall The Holy Family Parish Church GMA Town Proper

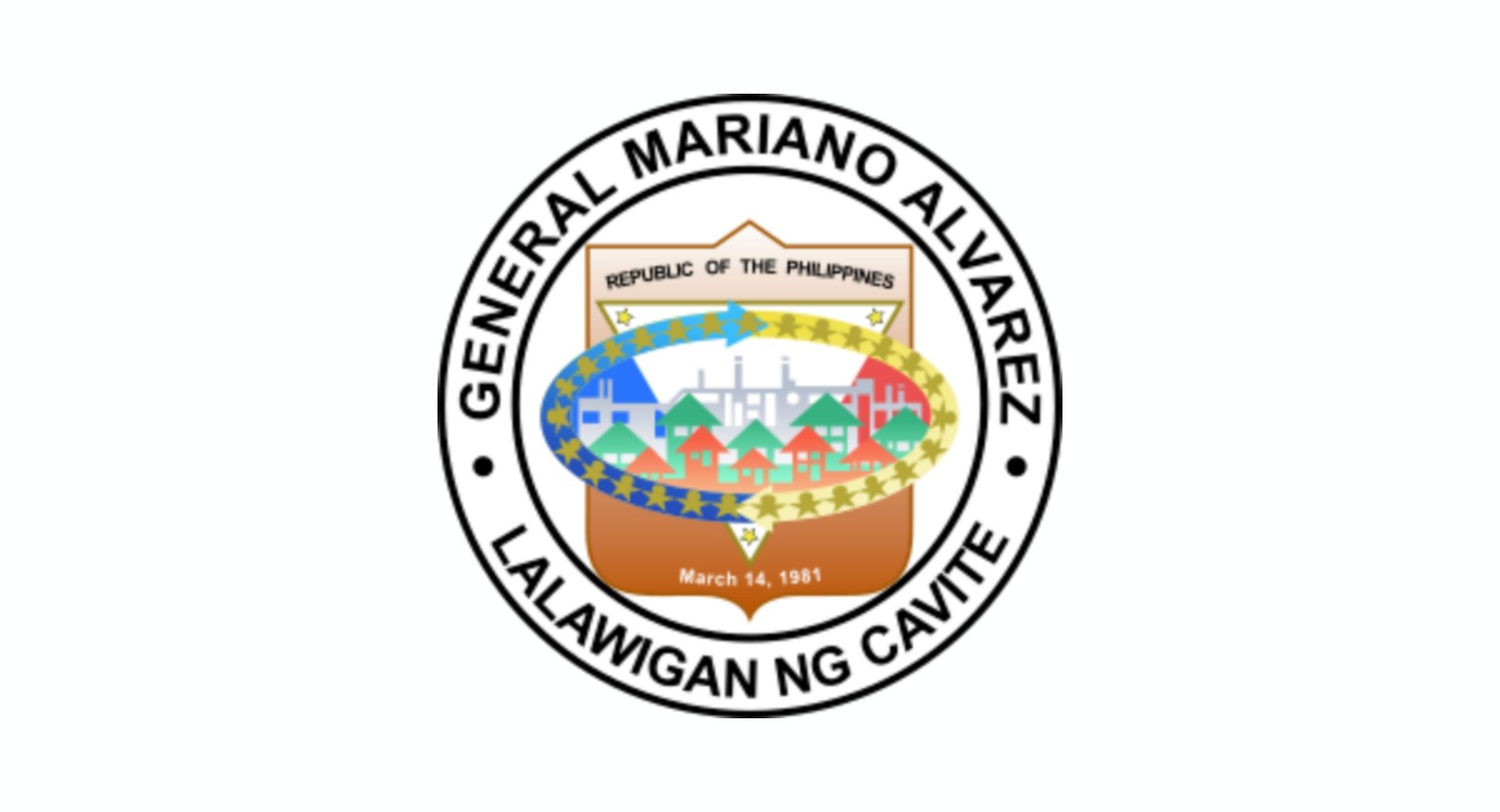
- Flag Seal
- Nicknames: Mushroom Capital of the Philippines
- Motto(s): Bukas na Pamahalaan, Serbisyong Pambayan (Open Government, Service to the People)
- Anthem: General Mariano Alvarez Hymn
- Map of Cavite with General Mariano Alvarez highlighted
- Interactive map of General Mariano Alvarez
- Location within the Philippines
- Coordinates: 14°18′N 121°00′E
- Country: Philippines
- Region: Calabarzon
- Province: Cavite
- District: 5th district
- Founded: March 14, 1981
- Named for: Mariano Álvarez
- Barangays: 27 (see Barangays)

Government
  - Type: Sangguniang Bayan
  - Mayor: Medardo G. Custodio
  - Vice Mayor: Percival C. Cabuhat
  - Representative: Roy M. Loyola
  - Municipal Council: Members: Angelica C. Abueg; Angelina Lenin E. Paycana; Phlonel Aisa C. Gutierrez; Bongbong A. Sevilla; Leonisa Joana B. Virata; Artemio B. Sambrano; Richard D. Lara; Narita B. Libunao
  - Electorate: 91,724 voters (2025)

Area
  - Total: 9.40 km^{2} (3.63 sq mi)
- Elevation: 107 m (351 ft)
- Highest elevation: 243 m (797 ft)
- Lowest elevation: 11 m (36 ft)

Population (2024 census)
  - Total: 176,927
  - Rank: 12 out of 1,489 Municipalities
  - Density: 18,800/km^{2} (48,700/sq mi)
  - Households: 41,233
- Demonym: GMAnian

Economy
  - Income class: 1st municipal income class
  - Poverty incidence: 12.5% (2023)
  - Revenue: ₱ 601.6 million (2024)
  - Assets: ₱ 1,071 million (2024)
  - Expenditure: ₱ 541.7 million (2024)
  - Liabilities: ₱ 254.4 million (2024)

Service provider
  - Electricity: Manila Electric Company (Meralco)
- Time zone: UTC+8 (PST)
- ZIP code: 4117
- PSGC: 0402123000
- IDD : area code: +63 (0)46
- Native languages: Tagalog
- Catholic diocese: Roman Catholic Diocese of Imus
- Patron saint: St. Joseph the Worker
- Website: genmarianoalvarez.gov.ph

General Mariano Alvarez, officially the Municipality of General Mariano Alvarez (Tagalog: Bayan ng Heneral Mariano Alvarez) and often shortened as GMA, is a municipality in the province of Cavite, Philippines. According to the 2024 census, it has a population of 176,927 people.

== Etymology ==
The municipality was named after General Mariano Álvarez, a native of the town of Noveleta, Cavite.

== History ==
General Mariano Alvarez was formerly a part of Carmona. The province's third planned community was previously called Carmona Resettlement Project and was under the direct management of the People's Homesite and Housing Corporation (PHHC). The project started in March 1968 because of the need to clear the Quezon Memorial Circle in Quezon City of different shanties and other illegal constructions built on it. By 1974, the project lots became part of the full-fledged communities of poor and middle-class residents coming from Quezon City, Manila, Makati and Parañaque.

Due to the popular clamor of the residents of the aforementioned resettlement areas towards the conversion of their locality into an independent municipality, the ten (10) Barangay Councils of barangays San Gabriel and San Jose submitted resolution expressing their desire to the Sangguniang Bayan of Carmona which in turn favorably endorsed the idea through Resolutions No. 56-S-1978.

By 1979, the idea soon began to speed up as the provincial deputy to the Interim Batasang Pambansa, Helena Benitez, and MP for Eastern Visayas and concurrent Minister of Local Government, Jose Roño, pursued the separation of the growing communities, whose several of their residents were now working in the growing industrial factories in Carmona and in other parts of the province, as well as in agriculture and small enterprises.

The municipality was chartered through Batas Pambansa Blg. 75, on June 13, 1980. Proclamation No. 2033, signed on November 11, 1980, set the plebiscite on January 10, 1981. The ratification by the majority votes cast in a plebiscite at Carmona and its duly constituted barangays and President Ferdinand Marcos appointed the first set of local officials of General Mariano Alvarez. Its proportional share in the obligation of funds, assets and other properties of Carmona was transferred to the newly created municipality upon the recommendation of the Commission of Audit, which was approved on June 30, 1980. The new municipality's first officials were officially inaugurated on March 14, 1981.

The new town, for the next few years, was composed of the Resettlement areas of Barangays San Jose, San Gabriel and a portion of Cabilang Baybay. Barangay San Jose consisted of areas A and B, while Barangay San Gabriel consisted of Areas C, D, E, F, G, H, I, J, and K.

In 2006, the municipality celebrated its 25th anniversary with a line-up of activities participated in by the municipality's residents. General Mariano Alvarez also takes pride in being known as the “Mushroom Capital of Cavite” because of the mushroom culture facilities in the town. Mushrooms have become the town's main product in line with the “One Town, One Product” program of the Philippine national government.

== Geography ==
General Mariano Alvarez lies at the north-eastern boundaries of Cavite with Laguna. It is bounded to the north by San Pedro, Laguna, to the east by Carmona, to the west by Dasmariñas and to the south by Silang. General Mariano Alvarez is approximately 42 kilometres (26 mi) south of the City of Manila and 17 kilometres (11 mi) east of Trece Martires City, the capital of the province.

With an area of just 11.40 square kilometres (4.40 sq mi), it is the second most densely populated municipality in Cavite after Rosario.

=== Land area ===
General Mariano Alvarez has a total land area of 938.0137 hectares (2,317.882 acres) more or less as per Batasang Pambansa Bilang 76. These areas are currently occupied by 27 barangays of which five are considered Poblacion barangays and 22 others are regular barangays.

=== Topography ===
The municipality has elongated shape with a north, north-eastern orientation. It has a total length of about 7,040 meters (23,100 ft) and a width of about 780 meters (2,560 ft) at its smallest and 1,720 meters (5,640 ft) at its widest. The terrain is relatively flat plain from the south starting at the Governor's Drive running north covering about one third of the municipality's length at Poblacion 5. From this point the terrain gradually begin to gently slope in one direction in the middle portion of the municipality, undulating and rolling to more than one direction towards the north-eastern barangay of Epifanio Malia, portion of Francisco de Castro, Francisco Reyes and San Jose.

Inland water bodies serve as natural boundaries with neighboring municipalities and drain its surface waters towards Manila Bay and Laguna Bay. These are Embarcadero River on the western boundaries with Dasmariñas and San Gabriel River on the eastern boundaries with Carmona. A major tributary, of San Gabriel River traverse the inner areas of the municipality from Francisco de Castro and Southwoods to Jacinto Lumbreras.

The same tributary branches out at Inocencio Salud to serve as boundaries between the barangays of Col. J.P Elises and Aldiano Olaes, on the eastern side. Small streams crisscross the landscape forming natural drainage where waste drains from Manila Bay and Laguna de Bay. These water bodies run and form deep gullies which gave the land a mass ridge-like formation. Considering the height and mass of the water bodies, the ridge-like formation are highly elevated. Thus, the terrain as described above.

Man-made physical changes, includes the presence of the Congressional Road which stretcher on full length of the municipality from the Governor's Drive or the national highway in the south to Francisco de Castro on the north. It runs parallel to the water bodies mentioned above on the eastern side of the municipality. Structures such as houses, schools, commercial establishments, institutional buildings and industrial firms are located among this road, on gully sides of water bodies and the top flat plain areas of the ridge. Open grasslands and agricultural areas can be found on the western near central portion of the municipality.

=== Slope ===
The slope of the municipality ranges from 0-3% to 3-8% broad to level nearly level are classified under 0-3% slope. These are generally the flat plain level lands on the southern portion from the Governor's Drive extending inwards covering all Poblacion barangays, Gavino Maderan, Jacinto Lumbreras, Ramon Cruz, San Gabriel and Severino delas Alas, 3-5% slope are gently sloping areas with land sloping in one general direction. These areas compress the central portion of the municipality from Barangay Kapitan Kua, Pantaleon Granados and Marcelino Mimeje to Aldiano Olaes, Col. Jose P. Elises and portion of Foerillo Calimag, Macario Dacon and Benjamin Tirona. These also include Inocencio Salud and Bernardo Pulido.

Areas on the north and north-eastern side have slope of 5-8%. These are gently undulating and rolling lands sloping in more than one general direction. Portion of Baranay Feorillo Calimag, Macario Dacon and Benjamin Tirona and barangay of Francisco de Castro, Francisco Reyes, Epifanio Malia, Tiniente Tiago, Nicolasa Virata, Gregoria de Jesus and San Jose.

=== Climate ===
Climate data for General Mariano Alvarez, Cavite
Month	Jan	Feb	Mar	Apr	May	Jun	Jul	Aug	Sep	Oct	Nov	Dec	Year
Mean daily maximum °C (°F)	28 (82)	29 (84)	31 (88)	32 (90)	31 (88)	29 (84)	28 (82)	28 (82)	28 (82)	28 (82)	28 (82)	28 (82)	29 (84)
Mean daily minimum °C (°F)	19 (66)	19 (66)	20 (68)	21 (70)	23 (73)	23 (73)	23 (73)	23 (73)	23 (73)	22 (72)	21 (70)	20 (68)	21 (70)
Average precipitation mm (inches)	10 (0.4)	10 (0.4)	12 (0.5)	27 (1.1)	94 (3.7)	153 (6.0)	206 (8.1)	190 (7.5)	179 (7.0)	120 (4.7)	54 (2.1)	39 (1.5)	1,094 (43)
Average rainy days	5.2	4.5	6.4	9.2	19.7	24.3	26.9	25.7	24.4	21.0	12.9	9.1	189.3
Source: Meteoblue

=== Barangays ===
General Mariano Alvarez is politically subdivided into 27 barangays, as indicated in the matrix below and the image herein. Each barangay consists of puroks and some have sitios. All barangays are classified as urban.

Upon formation in 1981, General Mariano Alvarez consisted of resettlement areas of barangays San Jose (A and B) and San Gabriel (C, D, E, F, G, H, I, J and K). In 1985, most of these areas were further subdivided to comprise the current 27 barangays. Except for San Jose, San Gabriel and the poblacion barangays, they are named after the first area captains and people associated with the life and work of Mariano Álvarez.

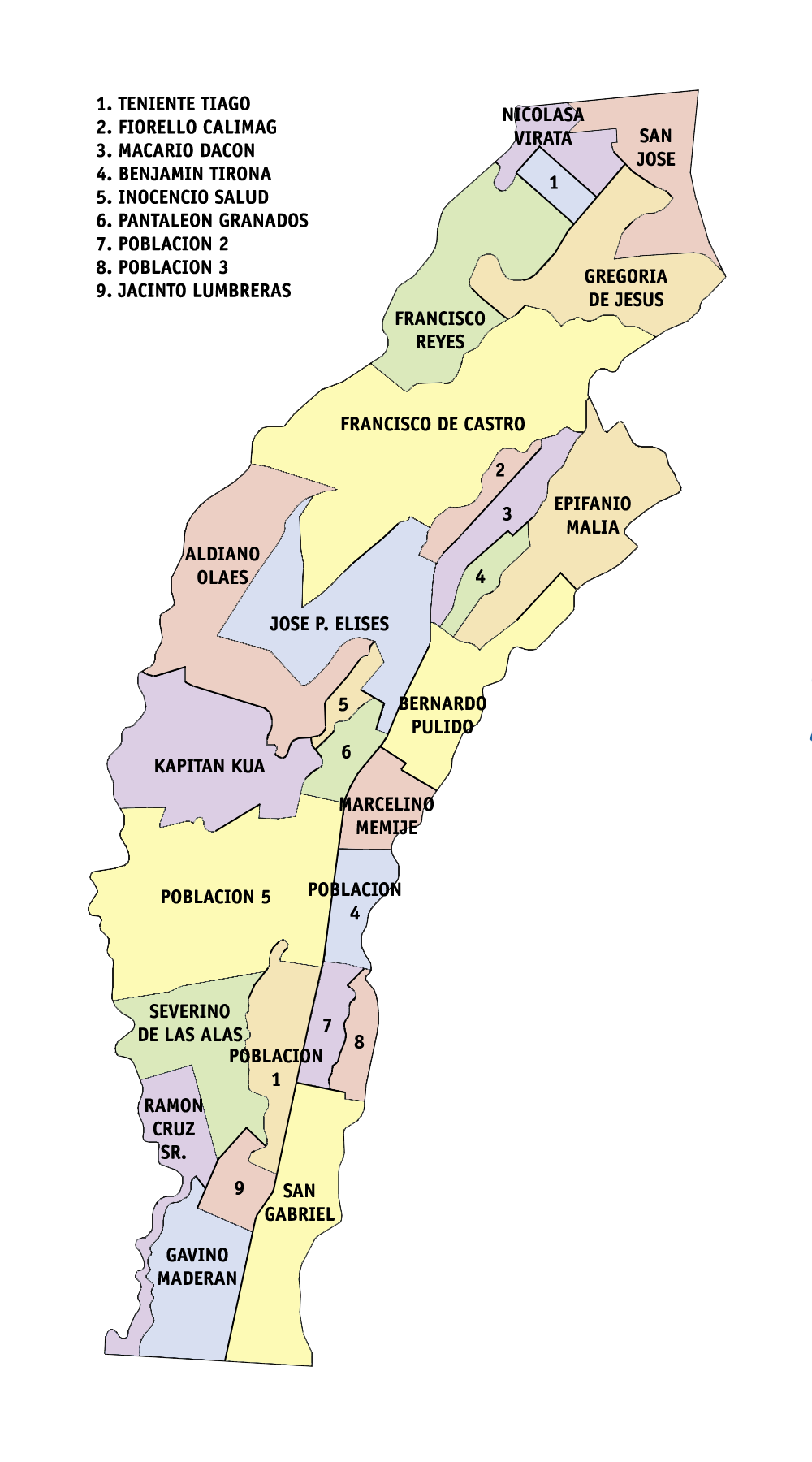
Barangay map of General Mariano Alvarez.

Barangay	Population		Created from
Barangay	2020	2010	Created from
Aldiano Olaes	9,554	3,457	Area F
Benjamin Tirona	2,924	2,566	Area D
Bernardo Pulido	14,358	12,461	Area H
Epifanio Malia	4,150	3,095	Area D
Francisco de Castro	10,067	8,666	Area B
Francisco Reyes	7,930	4,293	Area A
Fiorello Calimag	2,618	2,460	Area C
Gavino Maderan	8,599	6,150	Area J
Gregoria de Jesus	11,213	9,423	Area A
Inocencio Salud	2,567	2,300	Area F
Jacinto Lumbreras	4,272	4,052	Area J
Kapitan Kua	3,415	2,851	Area F
Koronel Jose P. Elises	4,509	3,606	Area E
Macario Dacon	5,181	4,638	Area D
Marcelino Memije	4,952	4,384	Area H
Nicolasa Virata	6,277	5,828	Area A
Pantaleon Granados	3,468	3,282	Area G
Poblacion 1	6,567	5,282	Area I
Poblacion 2	4,163	4,270	Area I
Poblacion 3	2,459	2,129	Area I
Poblacion 4	4,742	4,256	Area I
Poblacion 5	17,020	12,699	Area G
Ramon Cruz Sr.	7,678	7,225	Area J
San Gabriel	8,709	6,877	Area K
San Jose	4,330	3,684	Area A
Severino de las Alas	7,599	5,481	Area J
Teniente Tiago	3,112	3,125	Area A

== Demographics ==
Population census of General Mariano Alvarez
Year	Pop.	±% p.a.
1990	65,977	—
1995	86,824	+5.28%
2000	112,446	+5.70%
2007	136,613	+2.72%
2010	138,540	+0.51%
2015	155,143	+2.18%
2020	172,433	+2.25%
2024	176,927	+0.62%
Source: Philippine Statistics Authority

In the 2024 census, the population of General Mariano Alvarez was 176,927 people, with a density of 16,000 inhabitants per square kilometre or 41,000 inhabitants per square mile.

=== Religion ===
The majority of the inhabitants are Roman Catholics and Protestants. There are some such as: Iglesia Ni Cristo, United Pentecostal Church Int'l., Apostolic Church of Jesus Christ Phils. Inc., Family Tabernacle of Jesus Christ Int'l., Members Church of God International, Seventh Day Adventist and many others.

== Economy ==
Portal Mall

Poverty incidence of General Mariano Alvarez (%)

Source: Philippine Statistics Authority

== Healthcare ==
General Mariano Alvarez has two hospitals: San Jose Hospital & Trauma Center and GMA Medicare Hospital.

== Government ==
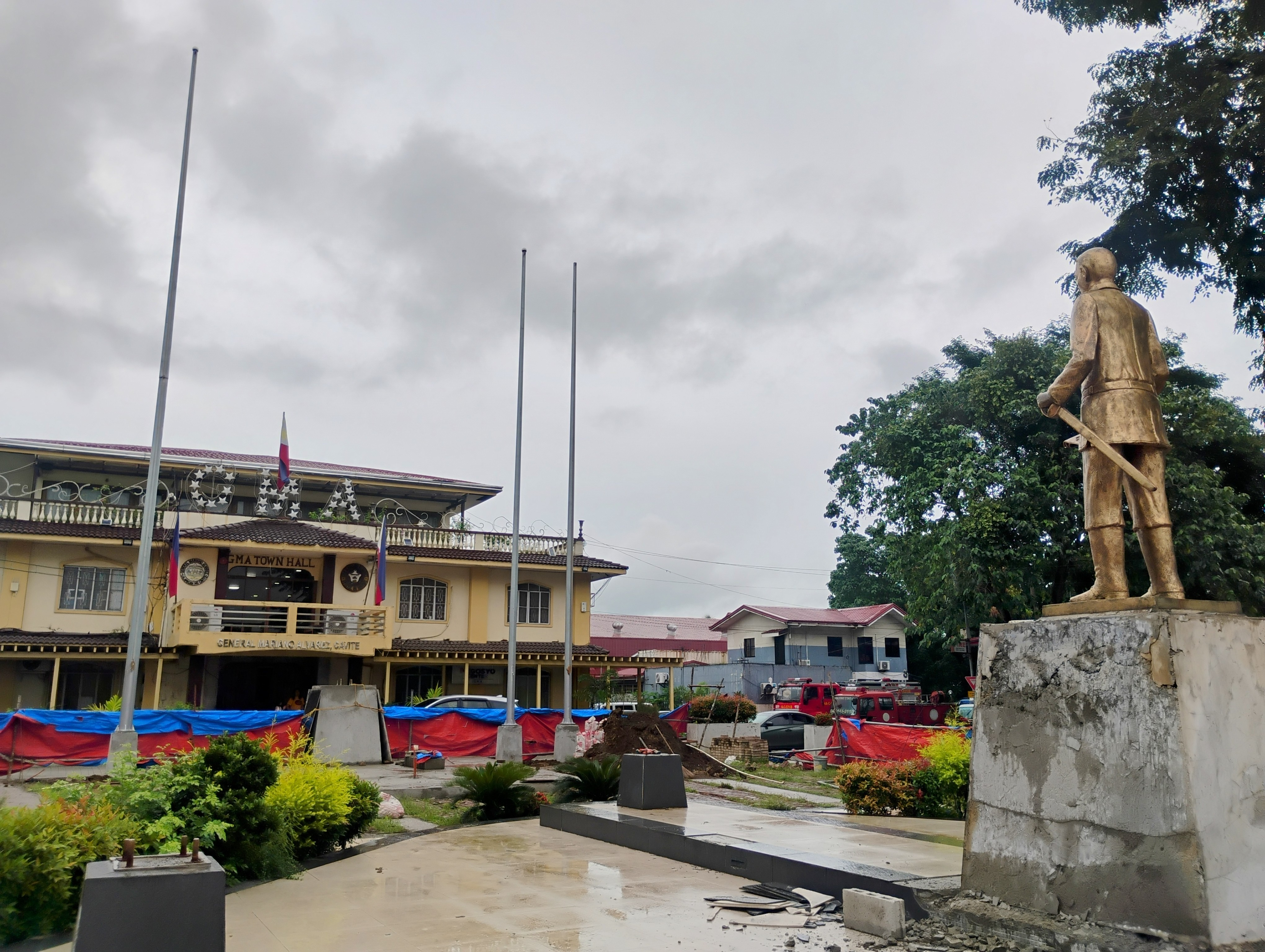
GMA Municipal Hall & Plaza

=== List of local chief executives ===
- Leoniso G. Virata (1981–1986; 1988–1998)
- Tomas E. Abueg (officer-in-charge, 1986–1987)
- Severino P. Tamala (officer-in-charge, 1987–1988)
- Antonio G. Virata (1998–2001)
- Walter D. Echevarria, Jr. (2001–2010; 2013–2021)
- Leonisa Joana B. Virata (2010–2013)
- Maricel E. Torres (officer-in-charge, 2020–2021), (assumed office, August 3, 2021–June 28, 2025)
- Medardo "Ed" G. Custodio (assumed office, June 28, 2025 - present)

=== Local court ===
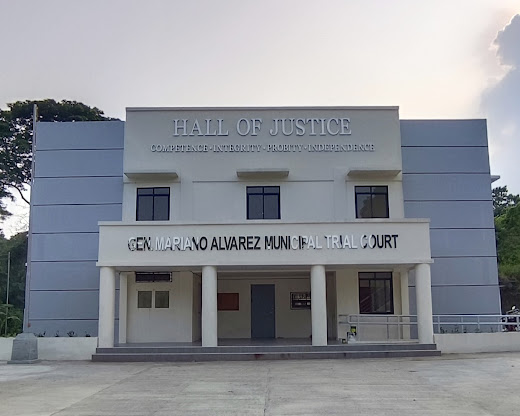
General Mariano Alvarez Municipal Trial Court

The GMA Municipal Trial Court is an official court of the said municipality, inaugurated on May 20, 2024, to provide more comfortable services and judicial process within the area. Its current judge is Hon. Wendy S. Reyes-Garcia.

Mayor of the Municipality of General Mariano Alvarez

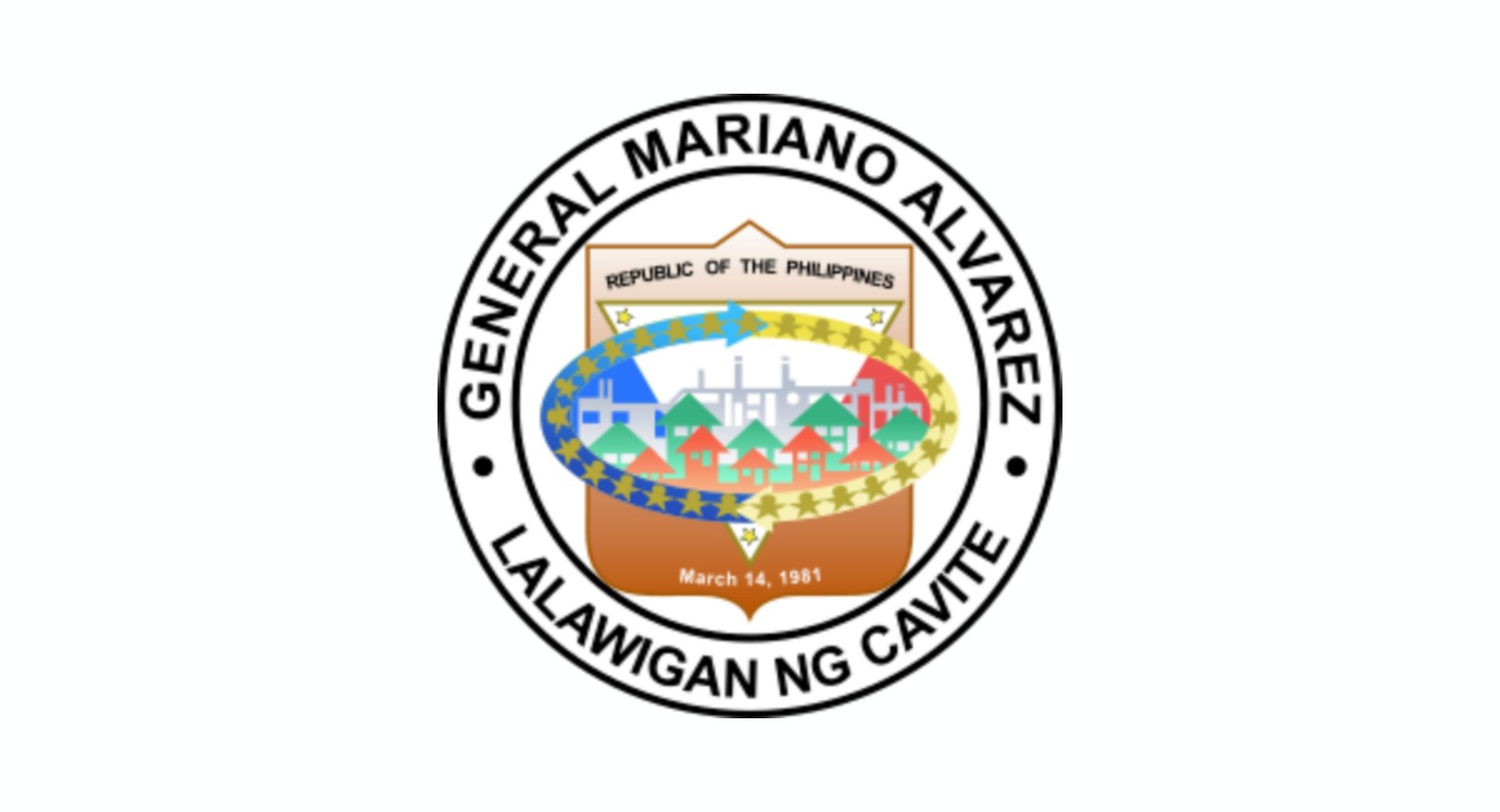

- Incumbent; Medardo G. Custodio since July 14, 2025
- Style: The Honorable
- Appointer: Elected via popular vote
- Term length: 3 years, may be reelected again for a maximum of 3 terms
- Constituting instrument: Republic Act No. 7160 (Local Government Code); Batas Pambansa No. 75 (Municipality of General Mariano Alvarez Act)
- Inaugural holder: Leoniso G. Virata, Municipal Mayor
- Formation: 1981
- Website: genmarianoalvarez.gov.ph

=== Municipal seal ===
Official seal used in 2006.

The seal of General Mariano Alvarez was officially adopted in 2006, by local resident Dr. Elias A. Alicaya, Jr. in 2006 to celebrate the 25th inauguration anniversary of the creation of the municipality.

== Education ==
The General Mariano Alvarez Schools District Office governs all educational institutions within the municipality. It oversees the management and operations of all private and public, from primary to secondary schools.

=== Primary and elementary schools ===
- Alta Tierra Integrated School
- Archangel Barachiel Center for Development
- Area J Elementary School
- Aquarius Learning Center
- Aquino School Foundation
- Biyaya Polytechnic Academy
- Bulihan Elementary School
- Campbell Christian Academy
- Christian Grace School
- Evangelical Christian School Foundation
- Francisco De Castro Elementary School
- Family Village Resources Elementary School
- Gen. Mariano Alvarez Technology High School
- Grace Baptist Christian School
- Grace of Christ Christian School
- Hillside Academy
- Holy Family Academy
- Jesus Christ is Lord Christian Learning Center
- Karunungan Village Academy
- Legion of Mary Learning Institute
- Maranatha Christian Academy
- Monte Cristo Research & Educational Institute
- My Messiah School (Pasong Saguing De Las Alas)
- My Messiah School (Poblacion 1)
- Nazarene Christian Academy
- Neville Learning School
- Our Lady of Grace Academy
- Our Lady of Peace and Good Voyage Learning Center
- Padre Pio Child Development Center
- San Gabriel I Elementary School
- San Gabriel II Elementary School
- San Gabriel III Elementary School
- San Jose Community High School
- San Jose Elementary School
- Shekinah Learning School
- St. Jonah Grace School
- Upon This Rock Christian Academy
- Vessel of Wisdom Christian School
- Victorious Christian Montessori School Foundation
- Vox Dei Academy
- Youth Circle School

=== Secondary schools ===
- Charity Learning Institute
- General Mariano Alvarez National High School

=== Higher educational institution ===
- Asian Institute of Computer Studies
- Philippine Technological Institute of Science, Arts and Trade
- University of Perpetual Help System

== Notable people ==
- Bugoy Cariño - actor
