= San Jose Hospital & Trauma Center =

San Jose Hospital and Trauma Center

Geography
- Location: Governor's Drive, Brgy. Maderan, General Mariano Alvarez, Cavite, southern Luzon, Cavite, Philippines
- Coordinates: 14°17′05″N 120°59′47″E

Organization
- Type: privately owned community hospital

Services
- Beds: 25 inpatient beds

San Jose Hospital & Trauma Center is located in the Philippine province of Cavite on Governor's Drive, which is the main highway between Cavite City and Tagaytay. The hospital, five stories high, is listed as a level 2 hospital by the Philippine Department of Health. It is one of two hospitals in the city of General Mariano Alvarez; the other hospital, GMA Medicare Hospital, has only ten beds as compared to San Jose's twenty-five beds.

== See also ==
- Nursing in the Philippines
