= Carmona, Cavite =

Component city in Cavite, Philippines

Carmona
- Component city
- City of Carmona; Lungsod ng Carmona
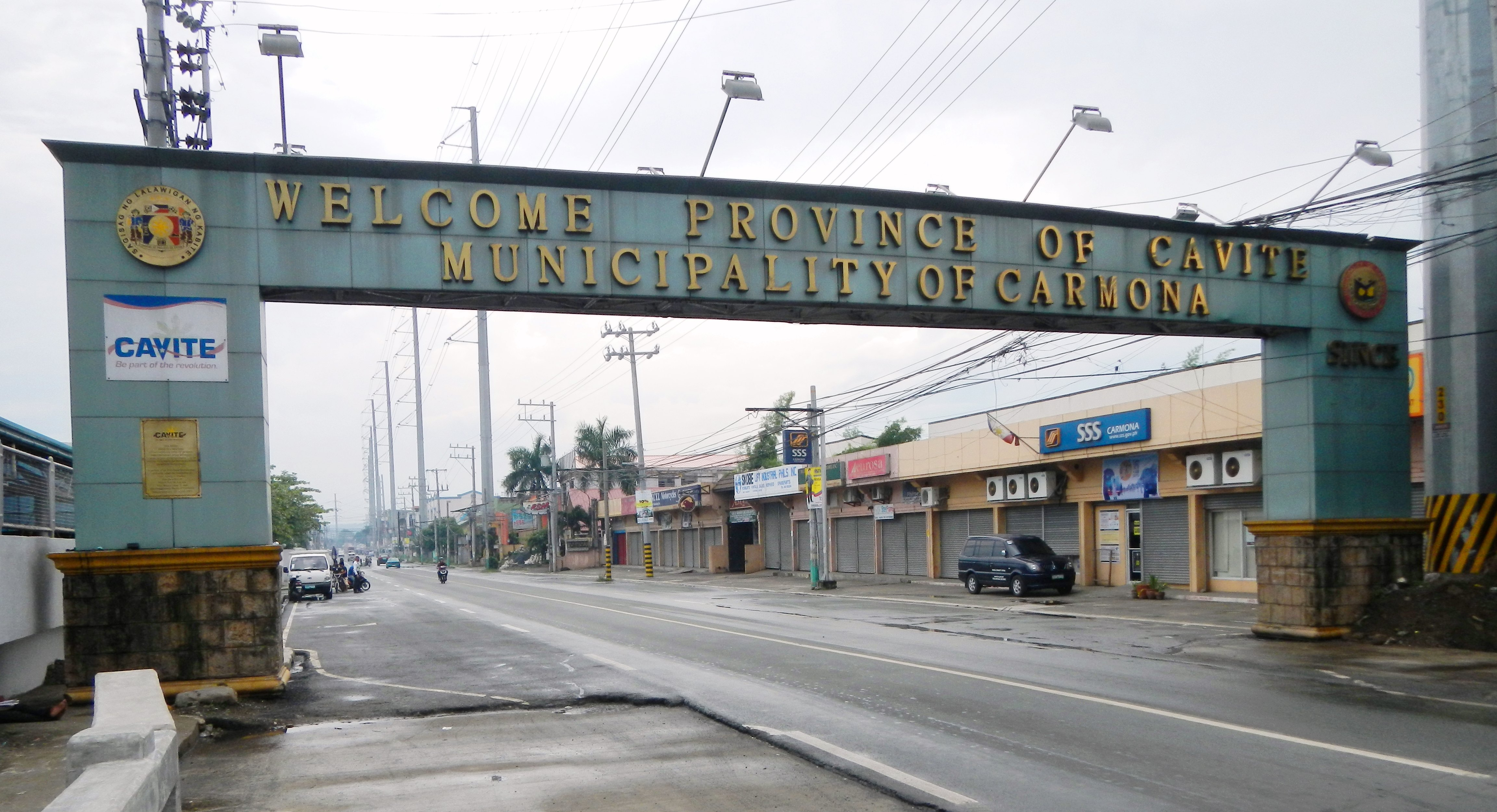
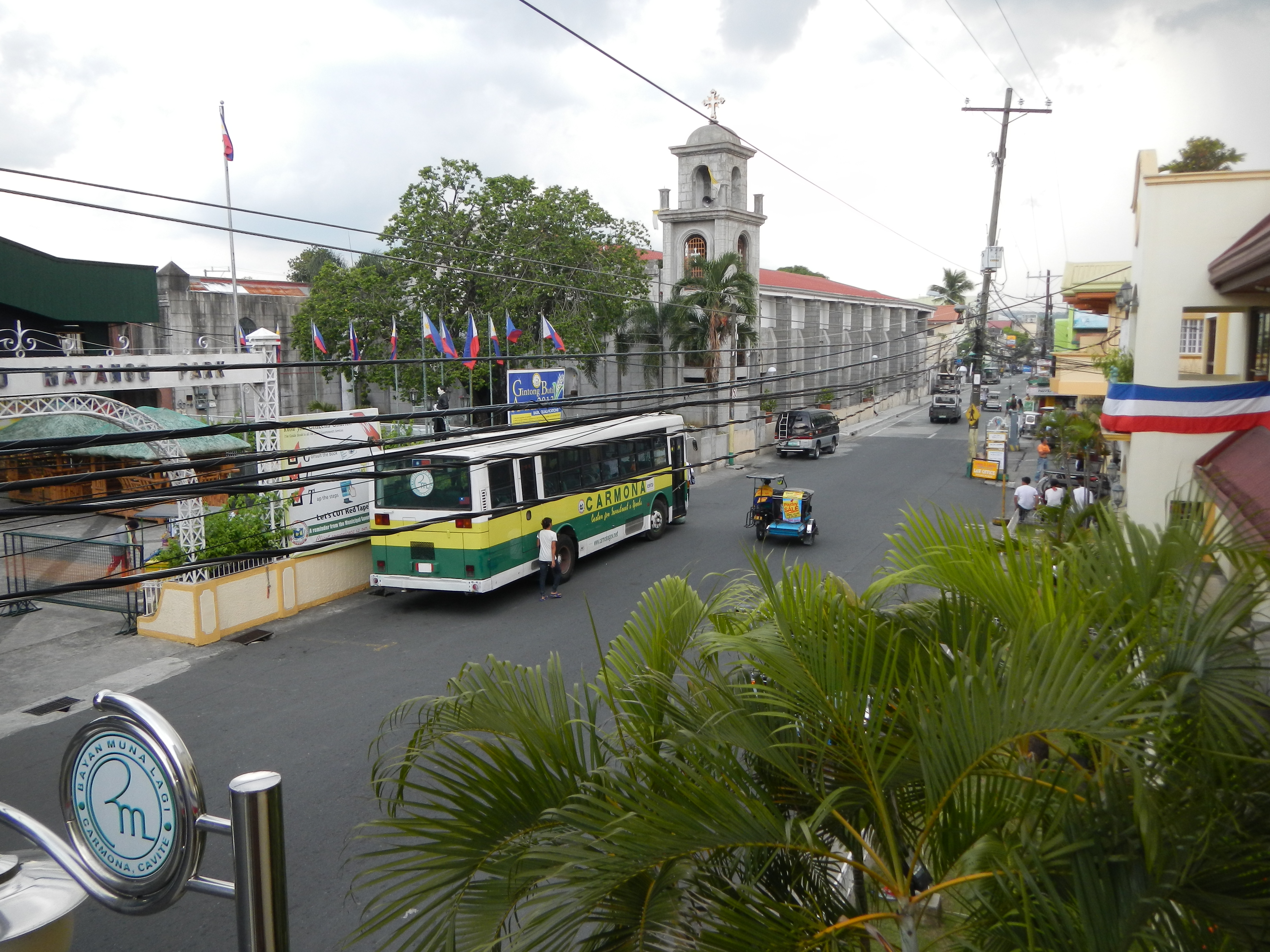
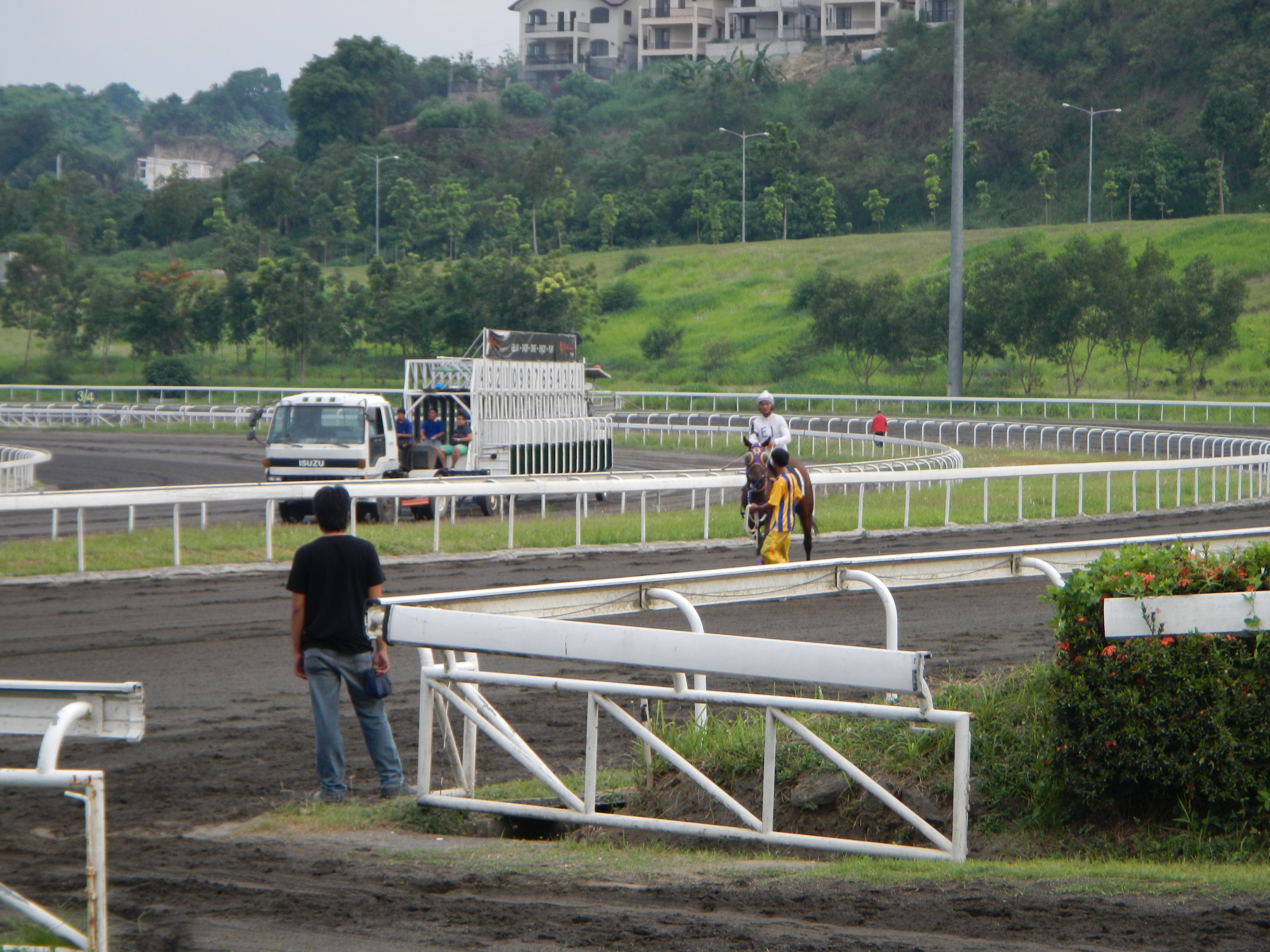
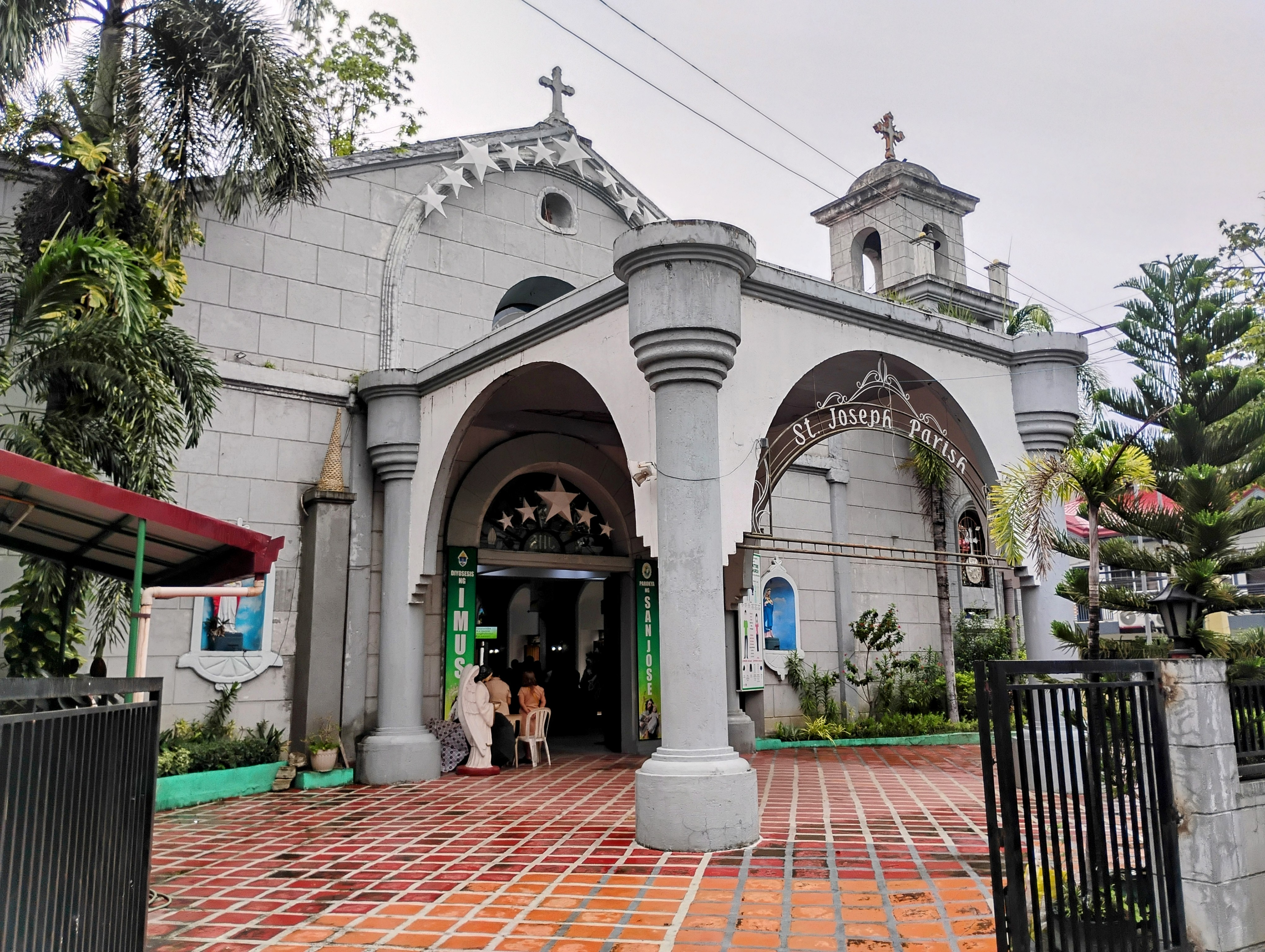
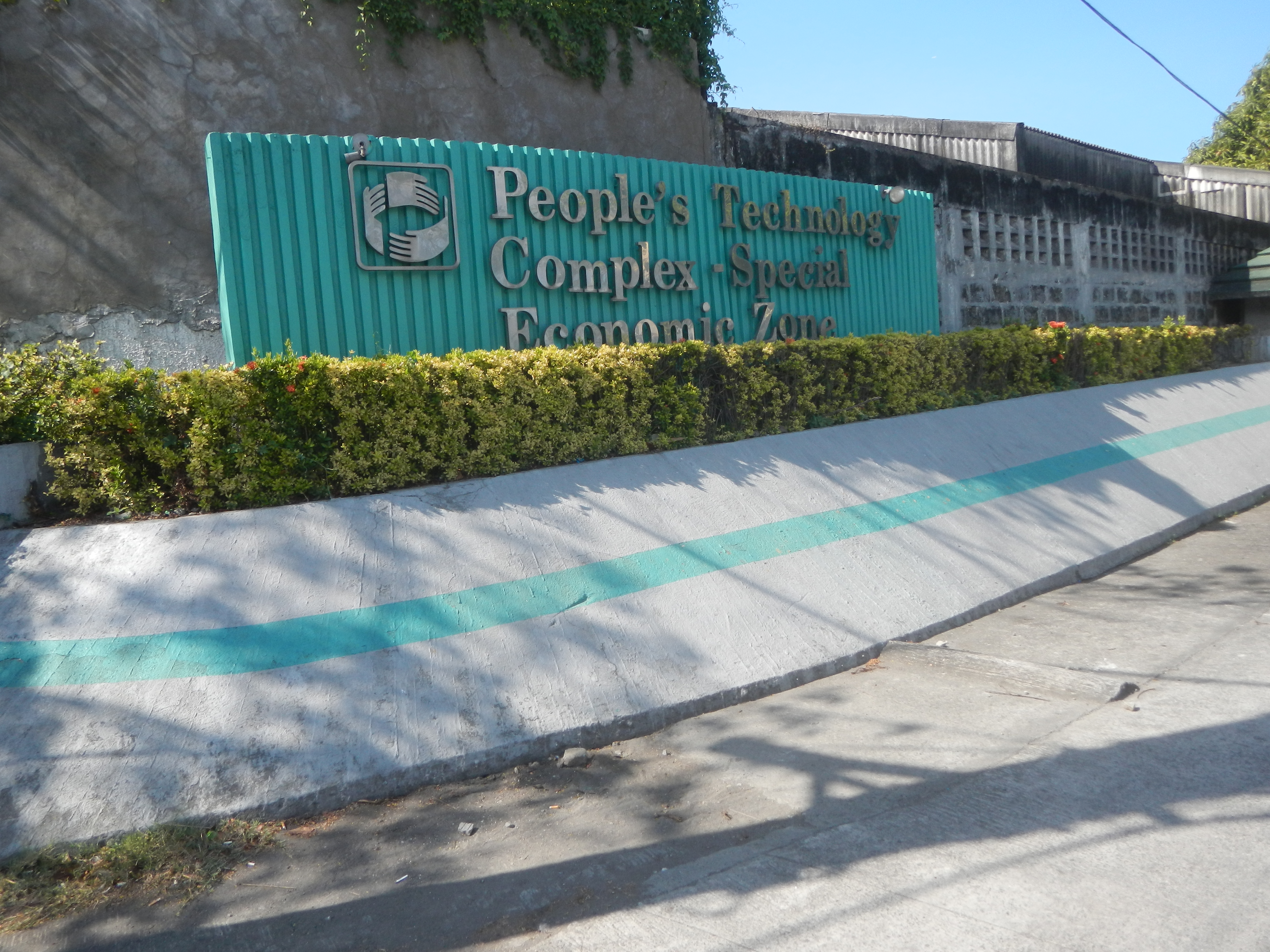
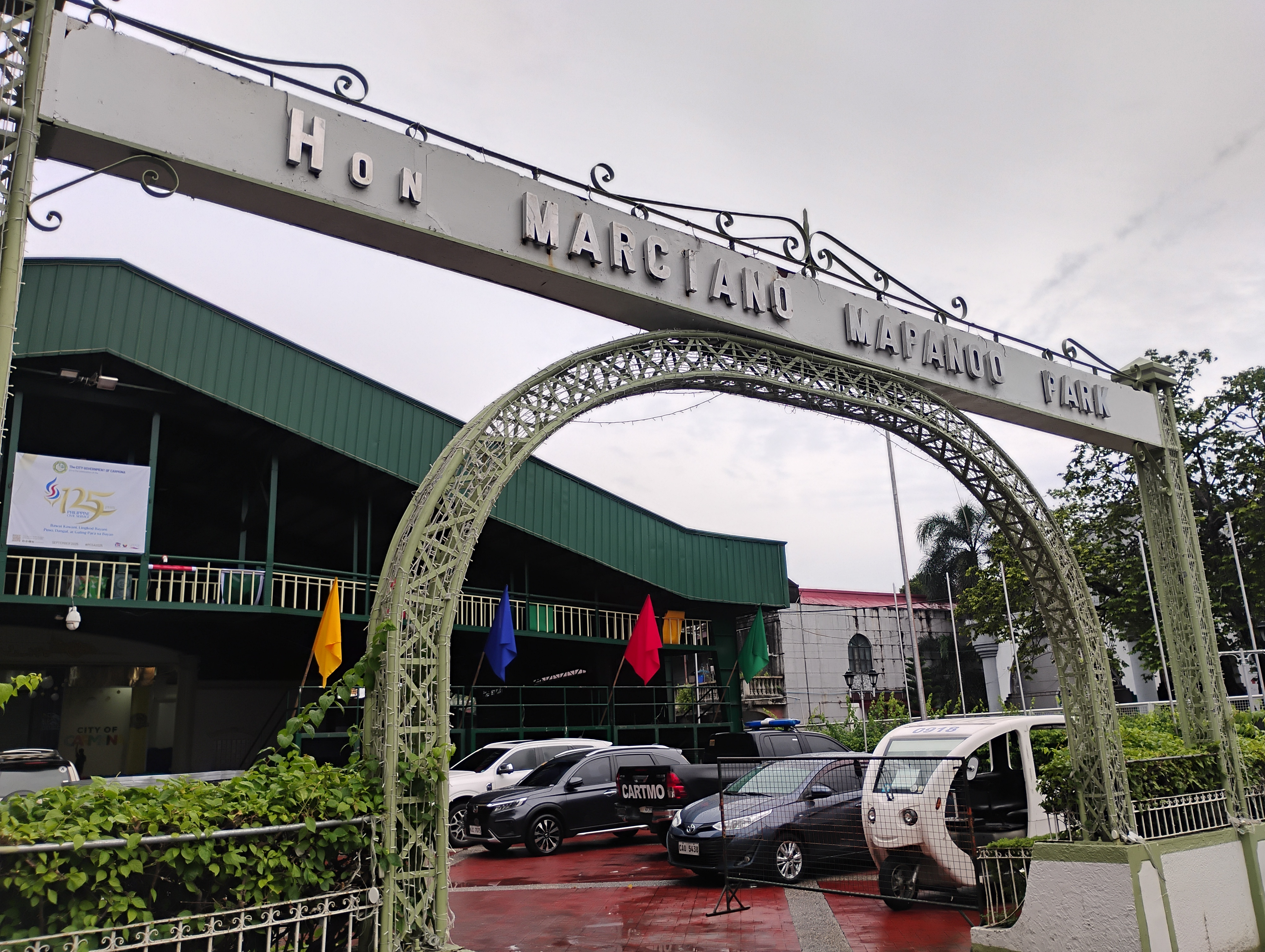
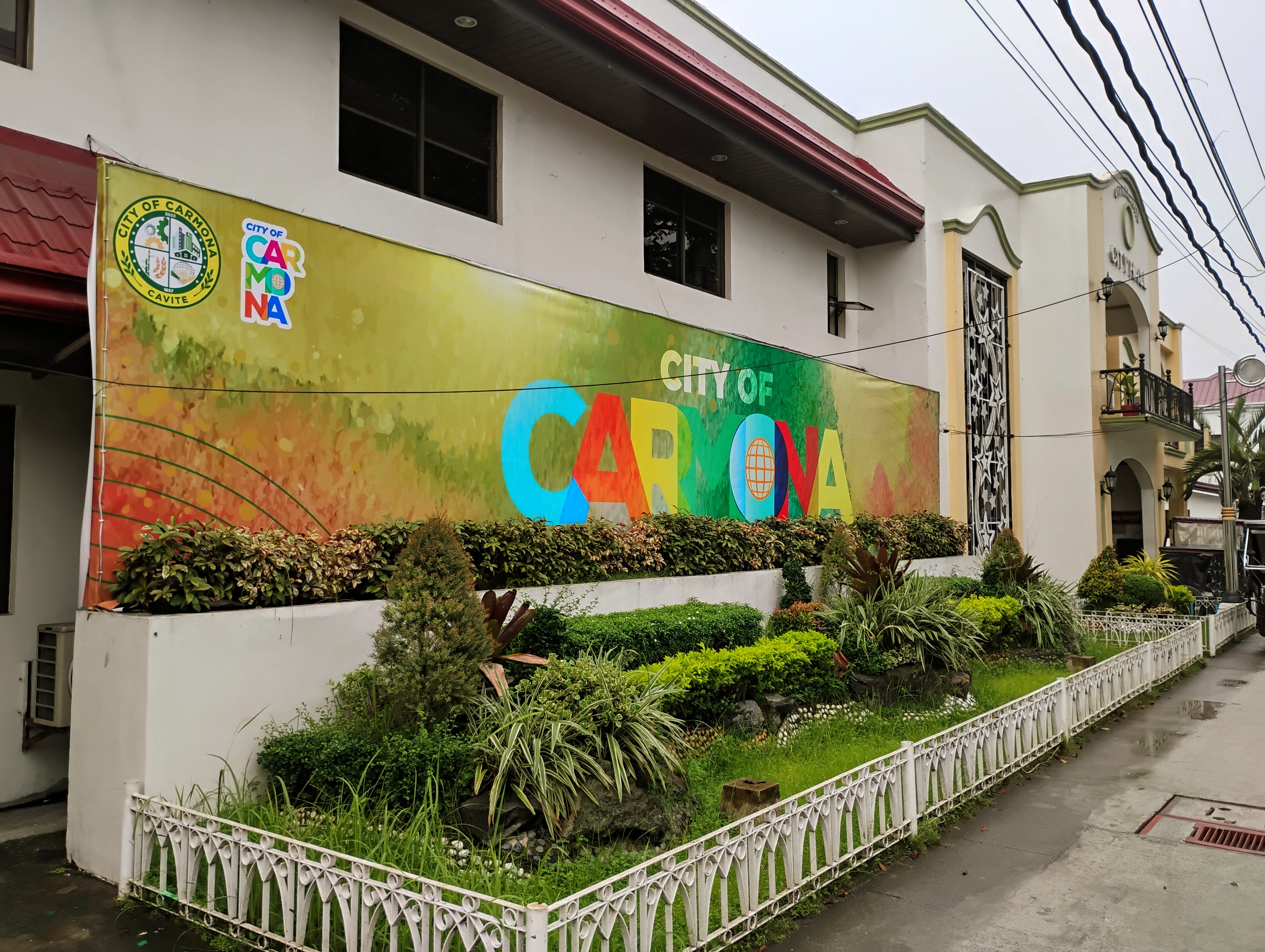
- Welcome Arch Poblacion Manila Jockey Club St. Joseph Parish Church People's Technology Complex Hon. Marciano Mapanoo Park City Hall

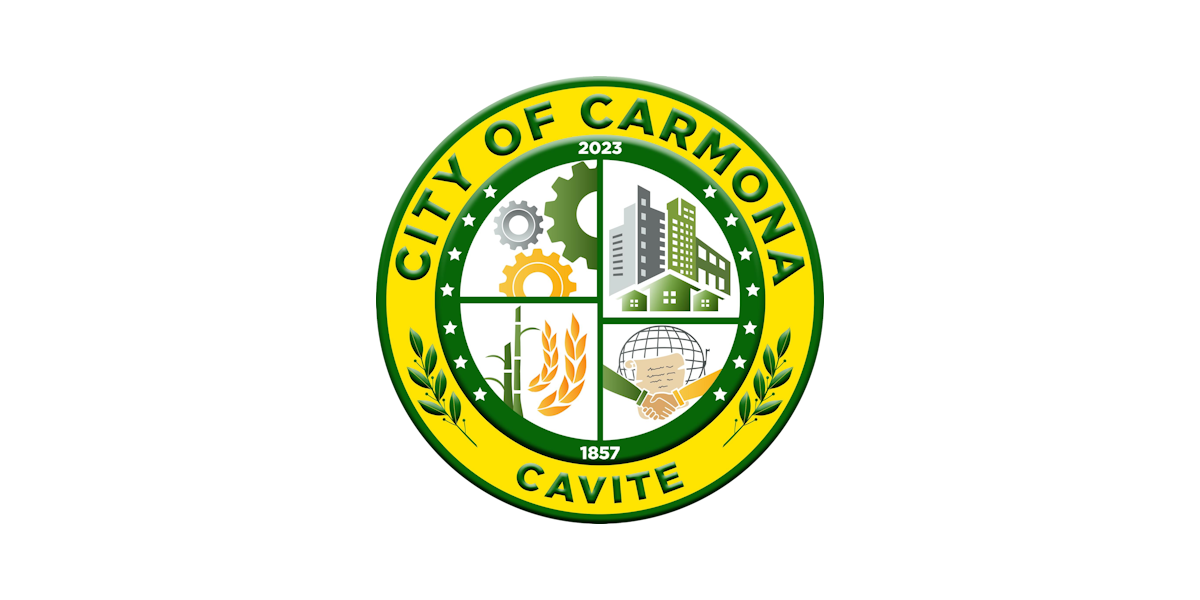
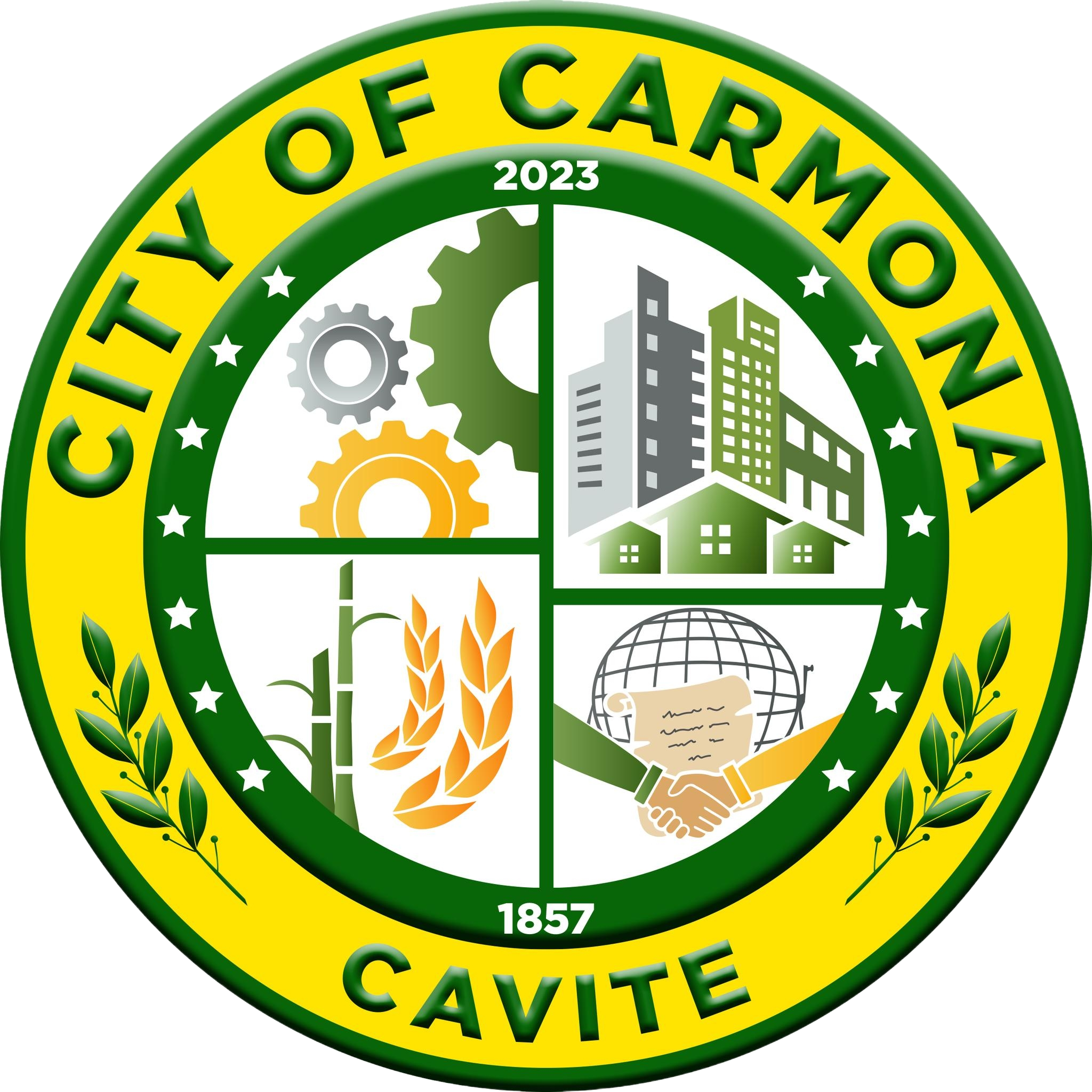
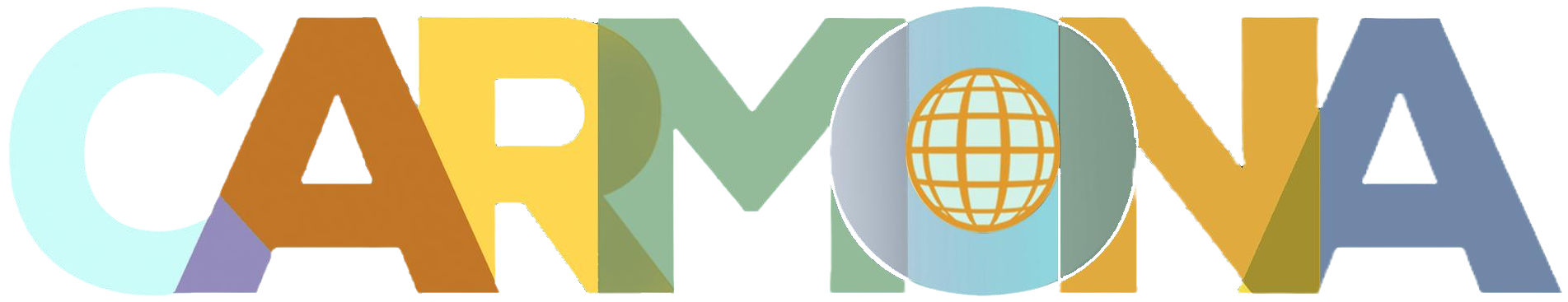
- Flag Seal Wordmark
- Nickname: The Smart City
- Motto: Bayan Muna Lagi (Filipino) 'The Nation First, Always'
- Interactive map of Carmona
- Location within the Philippines
- Coordinates: 14°19′N 121°03′E
- Country: Philippines
- Region: Calabarzon
- Province: Cavite
- District: 5th district
- Established: February 20, 1857
- Cityhood: July 8, 2023
- Named for: Carmona, Seville, Spain
- Barangays: 14 (see Barangays)

Government
  - Type: Sangguniang Panlungsod
  - Mayor: Dahlia A. Loyola
  - Vice Mayor: Cesar L. Ines, Jr.
  - Representative: Roy M. Loyola
  - City Council: Members: Roy A. Loyola III; Bernie Ortiz; Jojo Hermosa; Lizette Levardo; Leonila Manabat; Geraldine Maquinay; Domeng Tenedero; Almario Zamora; Rebecca Reyes; Amable Lontok
  - Electorate: 65,443 voters (2025)

Area
  - Total: 29.68 km^{2} (11.46 sq mi)
- Elevation: 112.13 m (367.9 ft)
- Highest elevation: 212.96 m (698.7 ft)
- Lowest elevation: 11.3 m (37 ft)

Population (2024 census)
  - Total: 112,140
  - Density: 3,778/km^{2} (9,786/sq mi)
  - Households: 28,154
- Demonyms: Carmonian (English); Carmonense, Taga-Carmona (Filipino)

Economy
  - Poverty incidence: 6.37% (2023)
  - Revenue: ₱ 1,866 million (2024)
  - Assets: ₱ 7,645 million (2024)
  - Expenditure: ₱ 713.9 million (2024)
  - Liabilities: ₱ 667.3 million (2024)

Service provider
  - Electricity: Manila Electric Company (Meralco)
- Time zone: UTC+8 (PST)
- ZIP code: 4116
- PSGC: 042104000
- IDD : area code: +63 (0)46
- Native languages: Tagalog
- Website: carmonagov.net

Carmona ([kaɾˈmɔna]), officially the City of Carmona (Tagalog: Lungsod ng Carmona), is a component city in the province of Cavite, Philippines. According to the 2024 census, it has a population of 112,140 people.

Carmona is the youngest city in the Philippines, having attained cityhood on July 8, 2023. It is the 149th city created in the country.

== Etymology ==
By virtue of a decree issued on February 20, 1857, by Queen Isabella II of Spain through Governor General Fernándo Norzagaray y Escudero, Latag became a separate municipality with the name it bears today: Carmona, named after the city of the same name in the province of Seville, Spain.

== History ==
=== Early history ===
Carmona was formerly a settlement called Latag, which was annexed to the town of Silang upon the latter's creation in 1595. The origins of its name are unknown. In 1856, the settlement's inhabitants demanded the conversion of Latag into a town, spearheaded by Tiburcio Purificacion.

Carmona history started with three brothers who came to the land of Carmona, which was at the time called Labac.

=== Spanish colonial era ===
In 1595, Silang was established as a town. The former sitio of Labac became Barrio Latag, while Carmona remained part of Silang. This was typical of the early Spanish period, when Silang's jurisdiction included areas that are now separate municipalities, such as Indang, San Francisco de Malabon (now General Trias), and Maragondon.

On March 9, 1746, a decree determined the boundaries of Silang and Biñan signed by Mayor Pedro Calderon Enriquez.

On November 15, 1759, two years after securing the independence of Carmona, the principales requested the Governor of Cavite for the reversal of the Canon on communal lands after constructing their own public buildings and irrigation works.

In 1838, the movement of the inhabitants of Latag to become a town started.

On February 20, 1857, due to its distance from the mother town, the principales and the incumbent Cabeza de Barangay of Barrio Latag petitioned for its separation and conversion into a municipality. The new town was named Carmona, after a town in the Spanish province of Seville.

On April 16, 1857, boundaries between Silang and Carmona were set.

On September 15, 1859, the inhabitants of Carmona returned to managing and ownership of communal lands.

On January 22, 1864, the incumbent gobernadorcillo and principales of Carmona petitioned higher authorities for the abolition of the repartimiento of the communal lands triennially.

In 1872, the communal lands were sold at public auction, which was opposed two years later by Don Gaspar Espiritu in a communication to the Superior Civil Governor.

On October 25, 1874, an event of great significance to the people of Carmona was a strong typhoon, which wrought considerable damage to the public works and private property.

On July 6, 1881, seven years later, the principales of Carmona requested the rectification of the town's boundaries.

During the Philippine Revolution in 1896, the gobernadorcillo of Carmona was Kapitan Damian Ermitano after the administrations of Tiburcio Purificacion, Mariano Mapanoo and Donald C. Virtucio, Augusto Manaog and Fabian Tenedero.

=== American occupation ===
After the revolution and the occupation of the country by the Americans in 1901, the first local executive of Carmona was Martin Reyes, who was followed next by Marcelo Reyes, Prudencio Torres, Juan Alumia, Estanislao Paular, Marciano Mapanoo, and Juan Zamora.

In 1941, the inhabitants of Carmona renewed the demand for "homestead" land.

=== Philippine independence ===
The mayors who assumed office after World War II were Bernardo Hebron, Eulalio Reyes and Cesar Casal and Felino L. Maquinay.

In 1959, the district of San Gabriel and San Jose of Barangay Kabilang Baybay were purchased by the National Government for the relocation of squatters from Metro Manila.

On March 14, 1981, the relocation site, which teemed with people from almost every part of the country and was more popularly known as the resettlement area, became an independent municipality called General Mariano Alvarez.

According to research conducted in 1982, by Sangguniang Bayan members Ernesto Zamora, Salvador P. Manahan, Pio Purificacion, Narciso Levardo, and Romy Laurito, assisted by Municipal Secretary Rogelio D. Paular, it was found out that the history of Carmona began during the 15th century. As related by a reliable informant, three brothers coming from the mountain of Silang were said to be the first settlers in the place which was then called "Latag", a Tagalog word for "plain" due to the numerous hills and plains in the area. The settlement was not known to other residents of Silang until some of them also went down to the place, cleared some forest areas and established their residence.

=== Cityhood ===
On June 30, 2022, House Bill No. 108 was filed by Cavite's 5th congressional district representative and former Carmona mayor Roy Loyola for the conversion of the municipality of Carmona into a component city. It was substituted with House Bill No. 3968 filed on August 24, 2022.

On September 5, 2022, the measure was approved by the House of Representatives on final reading. It was transmitted and received by the Senate on September 6, 2022. On January 30, 2023, the Senate approved the bill on third and final reading.

Republic Act No. 11938, a law which will convert Carmona into a component city, was signed by President Bongbong Marcos on February 23, 2023.

A plebiscite was held on July 8, 2023 in 116 clustered precincts across ten voting centers; at least half of more than 58 thousand voters participated. By virtue of Republic Act No. 11938, Carmona became Cavite's eighth city after the cityhood law was ratified.

== Geography ==
Carmona is located on the easternmost part of the province of Cavite, 48 kilometres (30 mi) south of Manila, 28 kilometres (17 mi) from the provincial capital Imus, and 13 kilometres (8.1 mi) from Biñan. It is bounded on the north, east and south by the City of Biñan, Municipality of General Mariano Alvarez (GMA) on the north-west and Silang on the south-west. The geographic coordinates of Carmona are about 14.32° latitude and 121.06° longitude.

The topography of Carmona is generally flat to strongly rolling or sloping, partly lowland and partly hill. Carmona is divided into four physiographical areas: the lowest lowland area, the lowland area, the central hilly area and the upland mountainous area.

The city is also within the path of a fault line, the Valley Fault System which starts from the Sierra Madre mountains.

=== Barangays ===
Carmona is politically subdivided into 14 barangays, as indicated in the matrix below and the image herein. Each barangay consists of puroks and some have sitios. The seat of government is in Barangay 4.

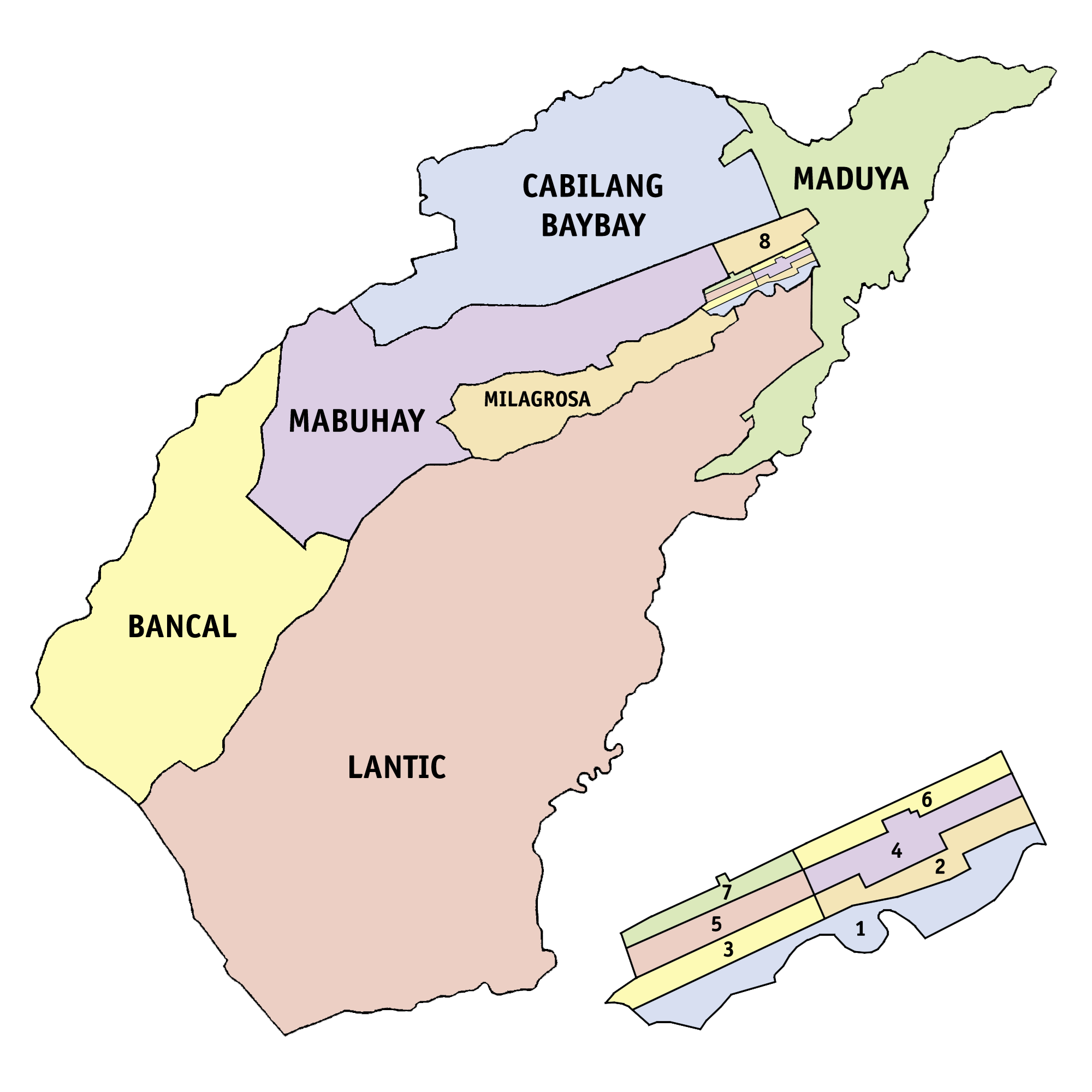
Barangay map of Carmona

Name	Area	Population		Coordinates	Map
Name	Area	%	2024 census	Coordinates	Map
Bancal	4.05 km^{2} (1.56 mi^{2})	17.43%	19,544	14.284°N 121.009°E	
Barangay 1	0.13 km^{2} (0.05 mi^{2})	2.09%	2,344	14.312°N 121.057°E	
Barangay 2	0.03 km^{2} (0.01 mi^{2})	0.69%	775	14.313°N 121.058°E	
Barangay 3	0.03 km^{2} (0.01 mi^{2})	0.80%	897	14.310°N 121.053°E	
Barangay 4	0.03 km^{2} (0.01 mi^{2})	0.55%	612	14.313°N 121.057°E	
Barangay 5	0.02 km^{2} (0.01 mi^{2})	0.48%	538	14.312°N 121.055°E	
Barangay 6	0.03 km^{2} (0.01 mi^{2})	0.66%	738	14.314°N 121.057°E	
Barangay 7	0.02 km^{2} (0.01 mi^{2})	0.68%	758	14.312°N 121.053°E	
Barangay 8	0.16 km^{2} (0.06 mi^{2})	2.62%	2,942	14.314°N 121.055°E	
Cabilang Baybay	4.34 km^{2} (1.68 mi^{2})	6.41%	7,187	14.317°N 121.050°E	
Lantic	13.64 km^{2} (5.27 mi^{2})	22.23%	24,929	14.298°N 121.049°E	
Mabuhay	3.69 km^{2} (1.42 mi^{2})	15.13%	16,972	14.311°N 121.049°E	
Maduya	2.55 km^{2} (0.98 mi^{2})	10.31%	11,563	14.322°N 121.064°E	
Milagrosa	0.95 km^{2} (0.37 mi^{2})	19.92%	22,341	14.308°N 121.048°E	

=== Land area ===
With a total land area of 29,749,874 square meters (320,224,980 sq ft), Carmona represents 2.17% of the total land area of the province. These areas are currently occupied by 14 barangays of which 7 are considered Poblacion barangays and 7 others are regular barangays. Barangay Lantic is the largest area while Barangay 2 has the smallest area.

=== Climate ===
Carmona has a Type I climate characterized by two pronounced seasons: dry from November to April and wet during rest of the year. Maximum rainfall usually occurs from June to September. The average annual rainfall is 200 millimeters (7.9 in) with a peak of 400 millimeters (16 in) in August.

The average annual temperature is 27.2 °C (81.0 °F). The highest temperature occurs during the month of May while the lowest occurs during the month of January.

The predominant wind direction comes from the south-west during the month of June to September and from the north-west during the month of October to January, while from February to April, the wind is coming from the southeast, predominantly in the month of May.

The average humidity of Carmona is 81%. This makes the city cooler than Metro Manila proper where the average humidity is higher.

Climate data for Carmona, Cavite
Month	Jan	Feb	Mar	Apr	May	Jun	Jul	Aug	Sep	Oct	Nov	Dec	Year
Mean daily maximum °C (°F)	29 (84)	30 (86)	32 (90)	34 (93)	32 (90)	31 (88)	29 (84)	29 (84)	29 (84)	29 (84)	30 (86)	29 (84)	30 (86)
Mean daily minimum °C (°F)	20 (68)	20 (68)	21 (70)	22 (72)	24 (75)	24 (75)	24 (75)	24 (75)	24 (75)	23 (73)	22 (72)	21 (70)	22 (72)
Average precipitation mm (inches)	10 (0.4)	10 (0.4)	12 (0.5)	27 (1.1)	94 (3.7)	153 (6.0)	206 (8.1)	190 (7.5)	179 (7.0)	120 (4.7)	54 (2.1)	39 (1.5)	1,094 (43)
Average rainy days	5.2	4.5	6.4	9.2	19.7	24.3	26.9	25.7	24.4	21.0	12.9	9.1	189.3
Source: Meteoblue (Use with caution: this is modeled/calculated data, not measured locally.)

=== Soil properties ===
The eastern side of Cavite consists of Carmona clay loam with streaks of Carmona clay loam steep phase and Carmona sandy clay loam. This type of soil is granular with tuffaceous material and concretions. It is hard and compact when dry, sticky and plastic when wet. This type of soil is planted with rice with irrigation or sugarcane without irrigation. Fruit trees such as mango, avocado and citrus are also grown in this type of soil.

=== Mineral resources ===
Cavite coastal areas have marl and conglomerate sedimentary rocks and some igneous rocks which are prominent in the high, mountainous regions of the western part of the province. Carmona reserves and deposits of sand, clay and gravel materials are found in Sitio Ulong Tubig, Mabuhay.

== Demographics ==
Population census of Carmona
Year	Pop.	±% p.a.
1903	2,606	—
1918	2,818	+0.52%
1939	5,394	+3.14%
1948	5,597	+0.41%
1960	8,212	+3.25%
1970	20,123	+9.36%
1975	51,004	+20.50%
1980	65,014	+4.97%
1990	28,247	−8.00%
1995	35,686	+4.48%
2000	47,856	+6.49%
2007	68,135	+4.99%
2010	74,986	+3.55%
2015	97,557	+5.14%
2020	106,256	+1.81%
2024	112,140	+1.30%
Source: Philippine Statistics Authority

In the 2024 census, the population of Carmona was 112,140 people, with a density of 3,800 inhabitants per square kilometer or 9,800 inhabitants per square mile.

In the 2010 census, Carmona had a total population of 74,986 which represented a total number of households at 14,885.

=== Population density ===
The highest densities are found in the Poblacion area (Barangays 1 to 8) and Barangays Milagrosa and Maduya, where land areas are significantly lower than the other barangays. Barangay Lantic posted development of the Kuok Property within the Lantic area; it is expected that the density will increase within the ten-year period.

=== Population distribution ===
Carmona's population is concentrated in Barangays 1 to 8 at the Poblacion area. Barangay Lantic is the most populated barangay, which posted a total population of 24,721. Dense population is also found in Barangay 9, the central business district of the municipality. Most population catalysts such as banks, town center, and commercial establishments are found in the Poblacion area.

=== Language ===
The main language spoken is Tagalog. In some areas they speak Chabacano or Chavacano, sometimes referred to by linguists as Philippine Creole Spanish, a Spanish-based creole language spoken in the Philippines. English is considered as the second language and is widely used as medium of communication in business and higher education. Other Philippine languages spoken are Waray, Bicolano, Cebuano, Ilokano, Pangasinense, and Hiligaynon. Chinese and Spanish are also spoken by some local residents.

=== Religion ===
The majority of inhabitants are composed of Roman Catholics, Protestants, and other non-denominational groups.

== Economy ==
Poverty incidence of Carmona (%)

Source: Philippine Statistics Authority

Cottage industries include metal works, metalcraft, footwear industries, concrete products, tricycle assembly, rattan handicrafts, and bakeries. Manufacturing firms engaged in handicraft (bags and shoes), furniture making, business retailing, personal and business services, and food-based enterprises contribute to the municipality's trade and commerce. Mercantile activities in the municipality are concentrated in the Poblacion area and along Governor's Drive. Carmona has been classified as a first-class municipality since July 1996, brought about by industrialization, real estate development, and commercial activities.

Carmona's progress accelerated after the conversion of more than 50 hectares (120 acres) of farmlands into industrial areas in 1998. Garment industries, steel fabrication, microchips and semi-conductors, tool fabrication, bus assembly, bulb factories, die casting, and other small and medium-scale industries currently operate in the municipality. These investments continue to provide local employment, generate export earnings, increase municipal revenues, and serve as vehicles for technology transfer. Foreign investments are pouring in as export-oriented industries continue to flourish.

Employment rate: Out of a potential labor force of 24,918 (members 15 years old and older who are actively seeking work), 98.03% are employed, while 1.97% are unemployed. The presence of 8 industrial estates and 2 industrial compounds contributes largely to the high employment rate of the municipality.

=== Agriculture ===
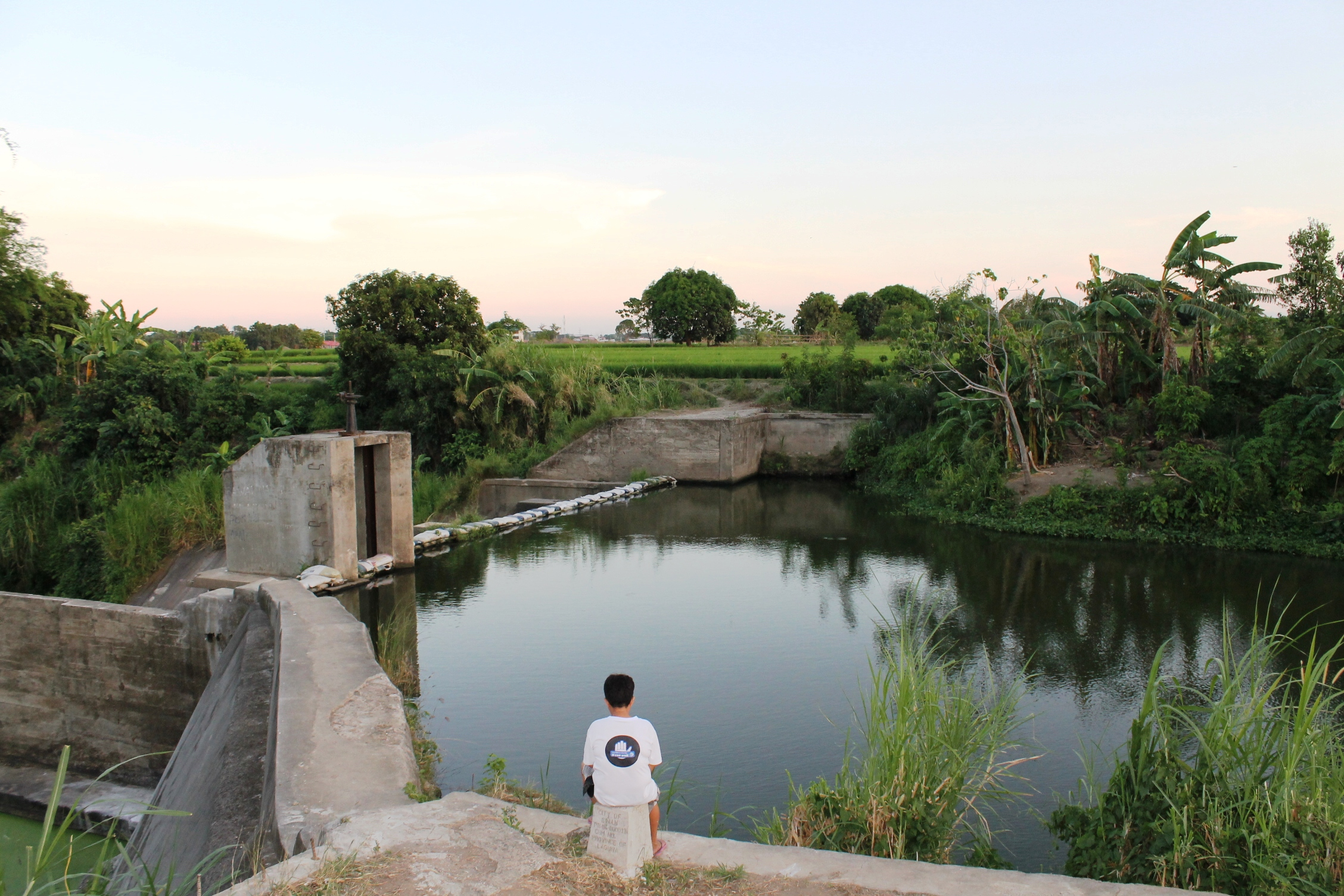
An irrigation dam in Carmona.

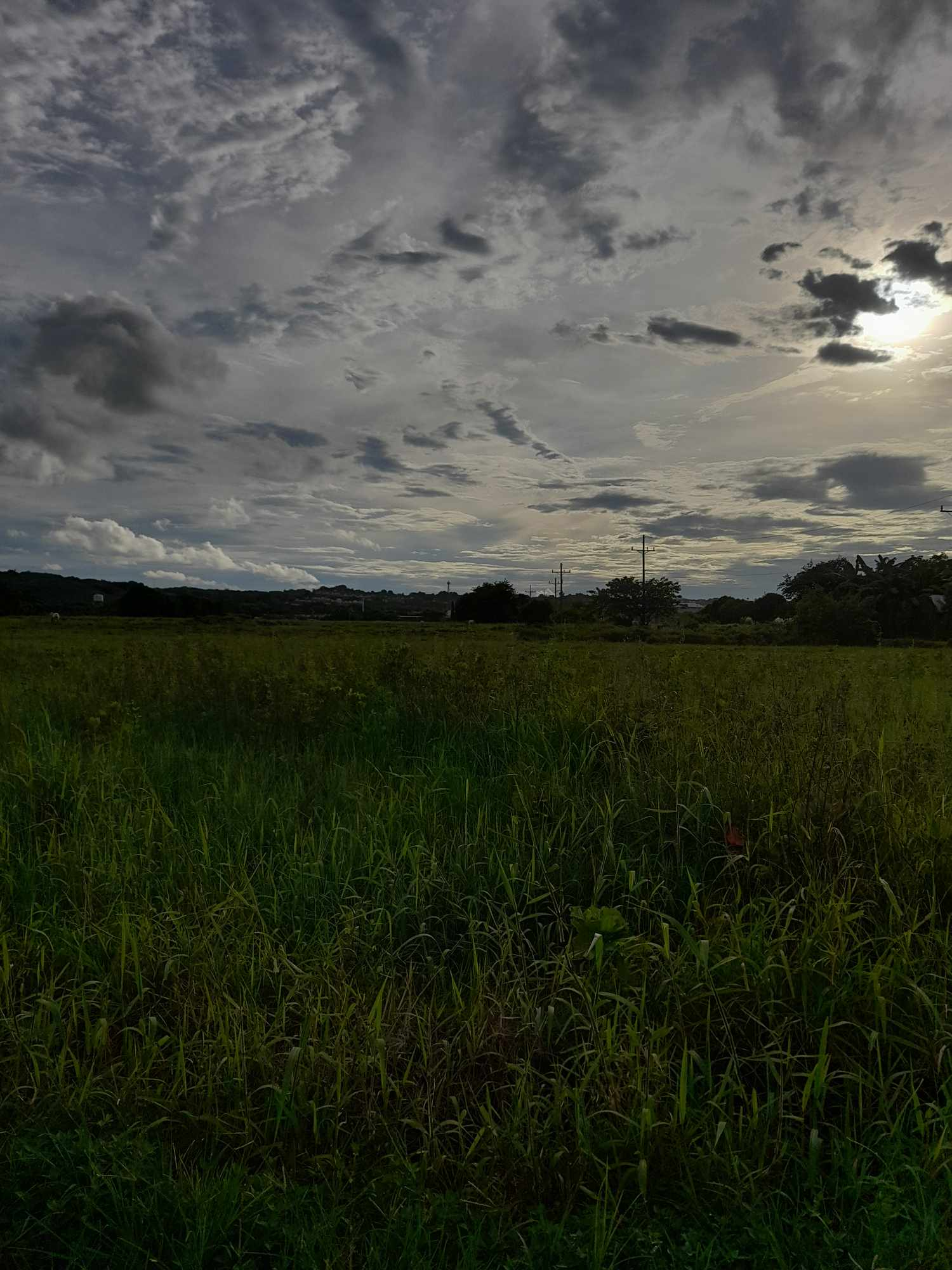
A rice field in Carmona.

The economy of Carmona is generally agricultural. Almost half of its total land area is devoted to agriculture.

In 2000, the total land area devoted to agriculture was 609 hectares (1,500 acres) or 19.7% of the total land area of Carmona. 230 hectares (570 acres) are irrigated areas all of which are currently planted with rice and vegetables, 30 hectares (74 acres) are upland rice areas, 122.5 hectares (303 acres) are for diversified trees and crops, and the 211.5 hectares (523 acres) are considered pasture land.

There are 217 farmers in the city engaged in planting and farming. Crops and livestock farmers are distributed among 14 barangays of Carmona.

However, with the implementation of the CALABARZON growth area, the City of Carmona has slowly become an industrial enclave in the province. The advent of industrialization has threatened the agricultural base of Carmona. As of April 1999, land used for rice production has gone down; sugarcane plantation has decreased considerably and those land uses for other crops and vegetables totaled 84.5 hectares (209 acres) during the same year.

At present, the programs and services of the Department of Agriculture (DA) are focused on five priority programs: a sustained self-sufficiency program for rice and corn, strengthening of production market linkage, an acceleration of livelihood program, aggressive assistance to organizational development of farmers, and assistance to agriculture-related priority programs of other government agencies.

Crop production
The major crops produced in the city are lowland and upland rice and sugarcane. Other crops grown are corn, vegetables, root crops, and fruit trees.

Fruits and vegetables production
In 2000, an area covering some 23.5 hectares (58 acres) was planted with various crops and fruit trees. These yielded an estimated 444 meters (1,457 ft) of assorted products.

Livestock and poultry production
Livestock and poultry raising in the city are largely backyard family enterprises. Animals raised are generally for home consumption and an additional income source for the family. Total production of livestock and poultry in 1999 registered a head count of 7,907. Pigs raised both for human consumption or for breeding purposes are estimated at 1,675, while the equally popular poultry raising produced about 4,472 head. An estimated 1,013 head of cattle, 31 head of carabaos and 716 goats were also produced. Based on reports of the municipal Agricultural Officer, the total livestock and poultry production in the municipality is still below the sufficiency level for beef, pork meat and eggs.

=== Industry ===
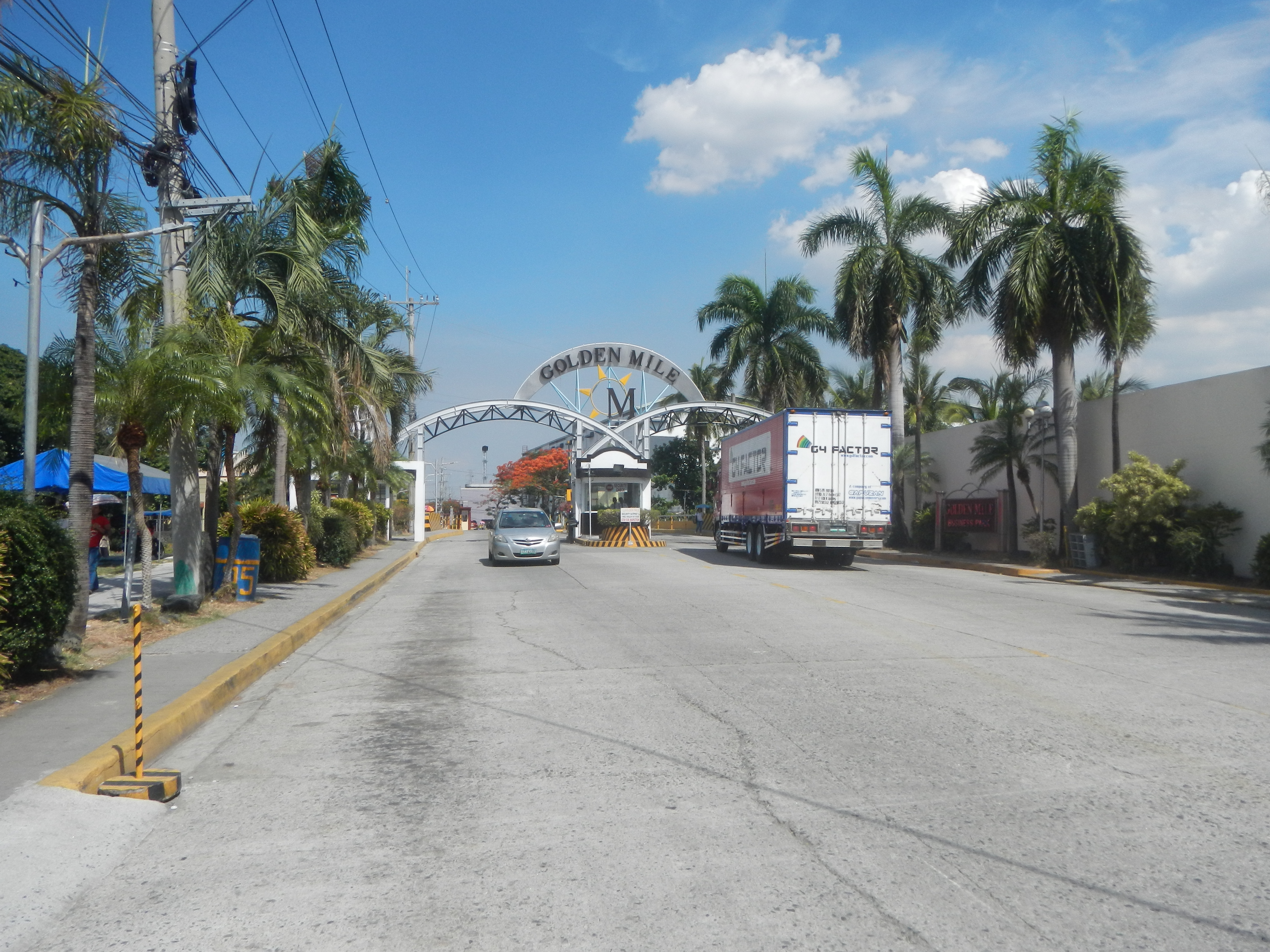
Golden Mile Business Park

Industrialization accounts for the rapid growth of Carmona's business community from an otherwise quaint agricultural town in the 1950s into the growing city of today. Brought about by huge capital from the national government, the industrial complexes bolstered the increase of the city's revenues and the change in the people's lifestyle.

There are eight existing industrial complexes located in the city limits. Its proximity to Manila and at the same time being the gateway to the Calabarzon area made Carmona a promising venue for business.

On the other hand, the local government has been very supportive of the investors. There are 114 factories in eight industrial parks/complexes to date. At present there are the eight industrial complexes strewn along the Governor's Drive, in a total of 419.31 hectares (1,036.1 acres), making up 13.56% of the town's land area. Ranging from 9 to 100 hectares (22 to 247 acres), these industrial estates are complete with amenities, secured, and in close coordination with the municipal government through the Carmona Business Club and other agencies.

=== Commercial and financial ===
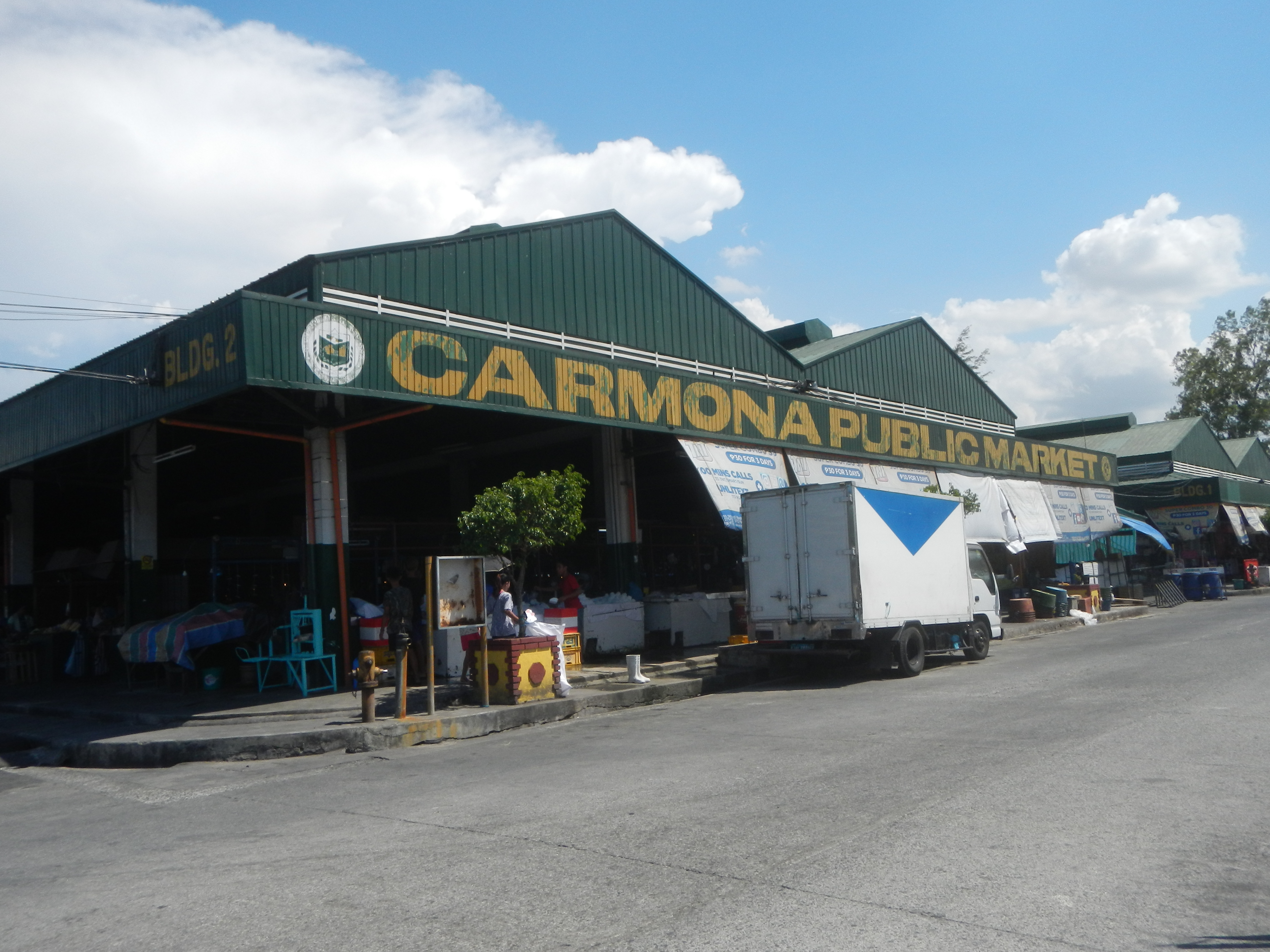
Carmona Public Market

One of the biggest commercial subdivisions in town is the Macaria Business Park in Barangay Mabuhay which houses a WalterMart branch in its 13.13-hectare (32.4-acre) lot. Recently, fast food chains and restaurants have been opened to compete for regular patronage at the Paseo de Carmona in Barangay Maduya.

Moreover, numerous traders and retailers are housed in the bustling Carmona Public Market.

The bulk of commercial activities come from wholesale/retail enterprises, which comprise a total of 619 establishments. There are also service-related establishments: businesses, food shops and amusement operators, with 35 banks and other lending institutions. Among the major banking institutions that cater to the financial needs of businesses in Carmona and neighboring towns are Bank of the Philippine Islands (BPI), Metrobank, Banco de Oro (BDO), Chinatrust Bank, Chinabank, Rizal Commercial Banking Corporation (RCBC), and Unionbank.

== Government ==
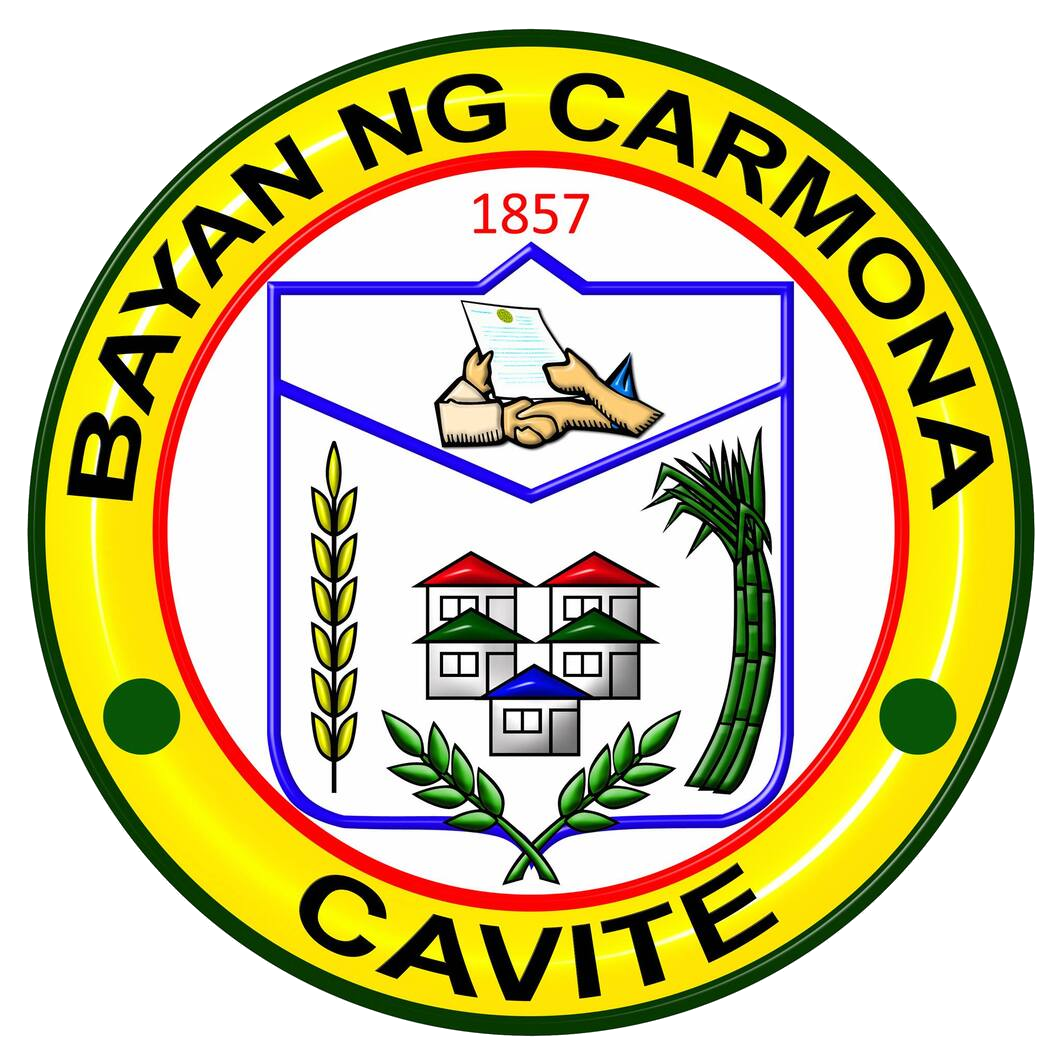
Seal of the former Municipality of Carmona, used until its cityhood.

=== Local government ===
The city of Carmona is governed by a city mayor designated as its local chief executive and by a city council as its legislative body in accordance with the Local Government Code. The mayor, vice mayor, and councilors are elected directly by the people through an election that is being every three years.

=== Elected officials ===
List of local government officials since June 30, 2025.

Members of the City Council of Carmona (2025–2028)
Position	Name
Chief Executive of the City of Carmona	Mayor Dahlia A. Loyola
Presiding Officer of the City Council of Carmona	Vice Mayor Cesar L. Ines Jr.
Members of the City Council	Hon. Roy A. Loyola III
Members of the City Council	Hon. Bernie Ortiz
Members of the City Council	Hon. Jojo Hermosa
Members of the City Council	Hon. Lizette Levardo
Members of the City Council	Hon. Leonila Manabat
Members of the City Council	Hon. Geraldine Maquinay
Members of the City Council	Hon. Domeng Tenedero
Members of the City Council	Hon. Almario S. Zamora
Members of the City Council	Hon. Rebecca Reyes
Members of the City Council	Hon. Amable Lontok
Liga ng mga Barangay President of the City of Carmona	Hon. Arnel B. Reyes
Sangguniang Kabataan Federation President of the City Council of Carmona	Hon. Patricia Therese Diaz

=== Former municipal mayors ===
1. Marcelino P. Clarito
2. Marcelo Reyes
3. Martin Reyes
4. Prudencio Torres
5. Marcelo Reyes (re-elected)
6. Juan R. Alumia
7. Estanislao G. Paular (1931–1937)
8. Marciano Mapanoo (1938–1941)
9. Candido G. Hebron (1942–1943)
10. Juan Zamora (1943–1944)
11. Alfredo Anulat (1944–1945)
12. Arsenio Mapalad (1945–1946)
13. Bernardo B. Hebron (1946–1955)
14. Eulalio Reyes (1955–1956)
15. Cesar E. Casal (1956–1979)
16. Felino L. Maquinay (1980–1986)
17. Estelito Torres (OIC, 1986–1988)
18. Felino Maquinay (1988 – February 1990)
19. Rolando Rosas (February 1990 – 1995)
20. Roy M. Loyola (1995–2004; 2007–2010; 2019–2022)
21. Dahlia A. Loyola (2004–2007; 2010–2019; 2022–present)

== Healthcare ==
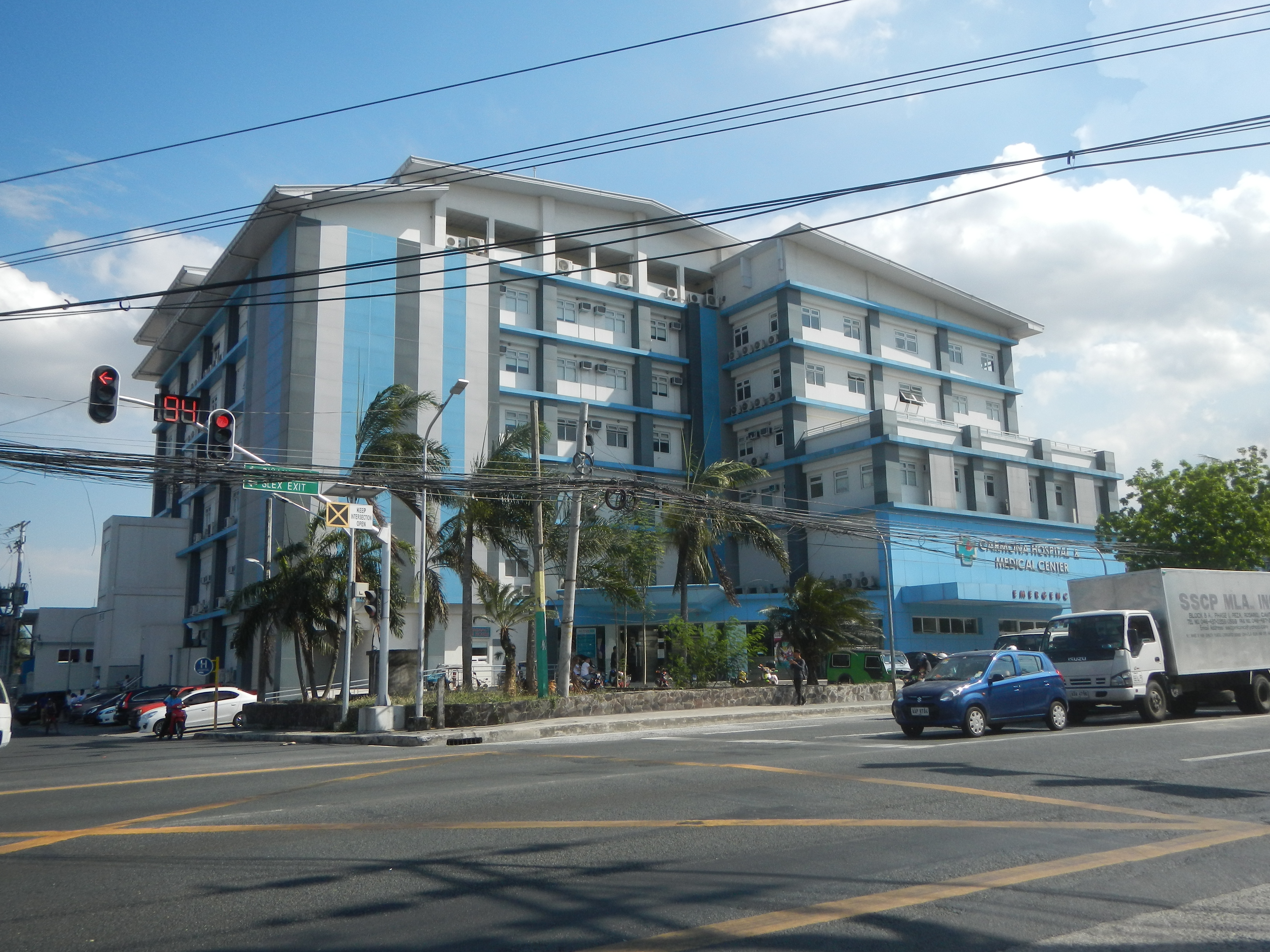
Carmona Hospital & Medical Center

The Pagamutang Panglungsod ng Carmona (lit. 'Carmona City Hospital' and the Rural Health Unit (RHU) are government-owned and run healthcare facilities in the town.

The main health center in the city is located in Barangay 4. A total of eleven barangay health centers, or substations, of the RHU are established in different barangays.

In addition to the rural health units and the Pagamutang Panglungsod, there are also private clinics and hospitals operating in the city. Eleven clinics are privately owned, and one clinic is under the supervision of government health workers.

== Education ==
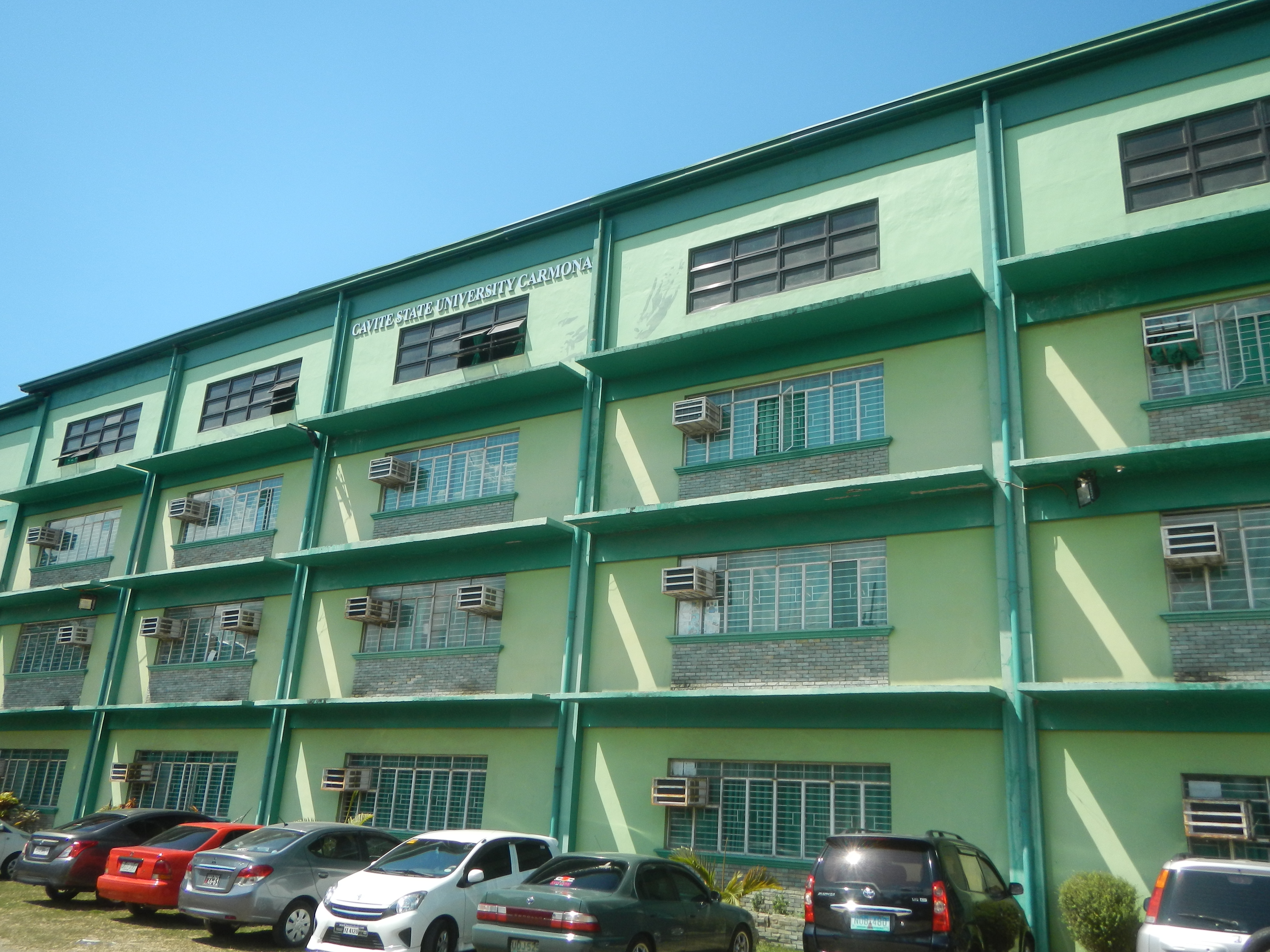
Cavite State University – Carmona campus

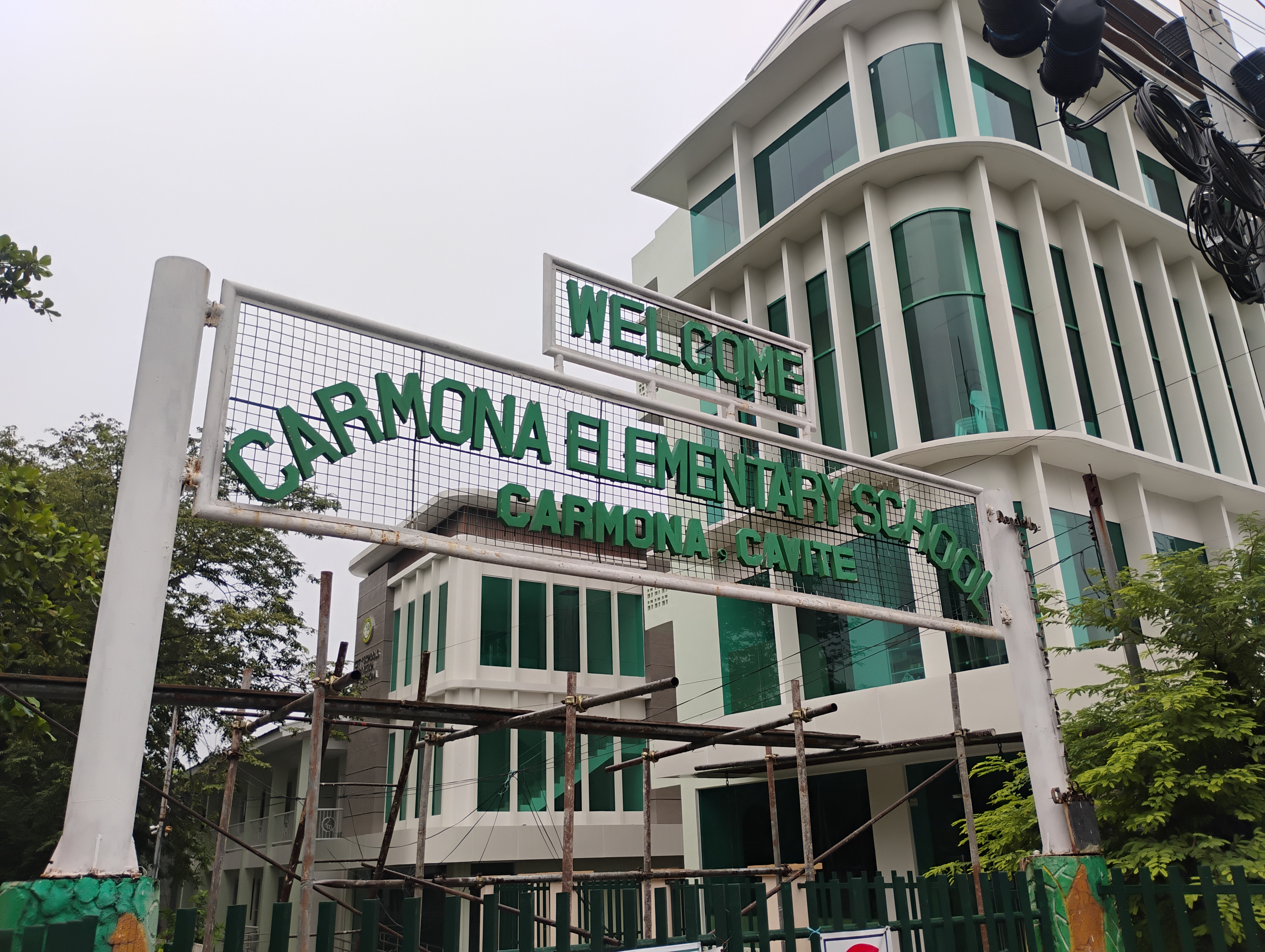
Carmona Elementary School

The education sector in Carmona has improved in many aspects of endeavor. In line with the local government's thrust of enhancing quality education, the Department of Education (DepEd), particularly the City Schools Division of Carmona, and Carmona National High School, with the full support of the local government unit, implemented various programs and projects that intensified the education sector's efforts to achieve its goals.

As early as 1995, various programs for the improvement of quality education started with a vision of producing competitive students at both the elementary and secondary levels. Carmona posted a literacy rate of 89%. The local government started with the computerization of all schools. Each public school was given computer units, and students were provided with computer lessons. This is in consonance with the belief that modern technology and equipment are considered factors in enhancing better education. To address the increasing number of enrollees and students, the LGU conceptualized the construction of 2-story buildings in different schools in Carmona.

At present, the municipality has a substantial number of classrooms and teachers to meet the learning needs of the school-age population. As of the school year 2005–2006, the municipality has 50 educational institutions, 28 of which are public schools and 17 are privately run. The public schools are categorized into 18 pre-schools, 9 elementary schools, 1 junior high school, 1 senior high school, and 1 tertiary school. The private educational institutions are composed of 10 pre-schools, 7 elementary schools, 3 secondary/high schools, and a computer college.
