= Cavite's 5th congressional district =

House of Representatives of the Philippines legislative district

- Constituency for the House of Representatives of the Philippines
- Interactive map of district boundaries
- Location of Cavite within the Philippines
- Province: Cavite
- Region: Calabarzon
- Population: 574,333 (2020)
- Electorate: 298,625 (2022)
- Major settlements: 3 LGUs: City; Carmona; Municipalities; General Mariano Alvarez; Silang
- Area: 251.75 km^{2} (97.20 sq mi)

Current constituency
- Created: 2009
- Representative: Roy M. Loyola
- Political party: NPC; Partido Magdalo
- Congressional bloc: Majority

Cavite's 5th congressional district is one of the eight congressional districts of the Philippines in the province of Cavite. It has been represented in the House of Representatives of the Philippines since 2010. The district consists of the city of Carmona and the adjacent eastern Cavite municipalities of Silang and General Mariano Alvarez, collectively known as Carsigma. It is currently represented in the 20th Congress by Roy M. Loyola of the Nationalist People's Coalition and Partido Magdalo.

== Representation history ==
#	Image	Member	Term of office		Congress	Party	Electoral history	Constituent LGUs
#	Image	Member	Start	End	Congress	Party	Electoral history	Constituent LGUs
=== Cavite's 5th district for the House of Representatives of the Philippines ===
District created July 27, 2009.
1		Roy M. Loyola	June 30, 2010	June 30, 2019	15th	Liberal (Magdalo)	Elected in 2010.	2010–present Carmona, General Mariano Alvarez, Silang
1		Roy M. Loyola	June 30, 2010	June 30, 2019	16th	Liberal (Magdalo)	Re-elected in 2013.	2010–present Carmona, General Mariano Alvarez, Silang
1		Roy M. Loyola	June 30, 2010	June 30, 2019	17th	PDP–Laban (Magdalo)	Re-elected in 2016.	2010–present Carmona, General Mariano Alvarez, Silang
1		Roy M. Loyola	June 30, 2010	June 30, 2019	17th	NPC (Magdalo)	Re-elected in 2016.	2010–present Carmona, General Mariano Alvarez, Silang
2		Dahlia A. Loyola	June 30, 2019	June 30, 2022	18th	NPC (Magdalo)	Elected in 2019.	2010–present Carmona, General Mariano Alvarez, Silang
(1)		Roy M. Loyola	June 30, 2022	Incumbent	19th	NPC (Magdalo)	Elected in 2022.	2010–present Carmona, General Mariano Alvarez, Silang
(1)		Roy M. Loyola	June 30, 2022	Incumbent	20th	NPC (Magdalo)	Re-elected in 2025.	2010–present Carmona, General Mariano Alvarez, Silang

== Election results ==
=== 2025 ===
2025 Philippine House of Representatives election in Cavite's 5th congressional district
Party	Candidate	Votes	%
NPC	Roy Loyola	149,622	61.00
Independent	Julie Tolentino	95,646	39.00
Total votes		245,268	100
NPC hold			

=== 2022 ===
2022 Philippine House of Representatives elections
Party	Candidate	Votes	%
NPC	Roy Loyola	201,418	91.57
PFP	Rhenan de Castro	18,540	8.43
Total votes		219,958	100%
NPC hold			

=== 2019 ===
2019 Philippine House of Representatives elections
Party	Candidate	Votes	%
NPC	Dahlia A. Loyola	161,772	94.89%
PDP–Laban	Jose Carpio	8,716	5.11%
Total votes		170,488	100%
NPC hold			

=== 2016 ===
2016 Philippine House of Representatives elections
Party	Candidate	Votes	%
Liberal	Roy Loyola	134,316	73.22%
Nacionalista	Ruben Madlansacay	49,113	26.77%
Total votes		183,429	100%
Liberal hold			

=== 2013 ===
2013 Philippine House of Representatives elections
Party	Candidate	Votes	%
Liberal	Roy Loyola	105,253	100%
Total votes		105,253	100%
Liberal hold			

=== 2010 ===
2010 Philippine House of Representatives elections
Party	Candidate	Votes	%
Liberal	Roy Loyola	83,813	53.31%
Lakas–Kampi	Armando de Castro	73,404	46.69%
Invalid or blank votes		4,310	2.67%
Total votes		161,527	100%
Liberal win (new seat)			

== See also ==
- Legislative districts of Cavite
