= Roy Loyola =

Filipino lawyer and politician (born 1962)

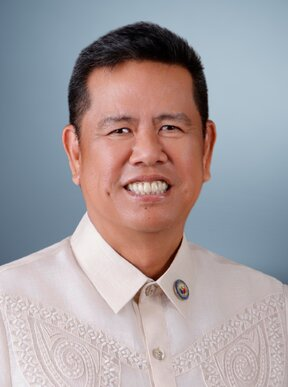
- Portrait of Loyola as member of the Philippine Commission on Appointments

Member of the Philippine House of Representatives from Cavite's 5th district
- Incumbent
- Assumed office June 30, 2022
- Preceded by: Dahlia Loyola
- In office June 30, 2010 – June 30, 2019
- Preceded by: District created
- Succeeded by: Dahlia Loyola

Mayor of Carmona, Cavite
- In office June 30, 2019 – June 30, 2022
- Preceded by: Dahlia Loyola
- Succeeded by: Dahlia Loyola
- In office June 30, 1995 – June 30, 2004
- Succeeded by: Dahlia Loyola
- In office June 30, 2007 – June 30, 2010
- Preceded by: Dahlia Loyola
- Succeeded by: Dahlia Loyola

Personal details
- Born: Roy Maulanin Loyola; February 17, 1962 (age 64) Philippines
- Party: NPC (2018–present); Magdalo (local party; 1995–present)
- Other political affiliations: PDP–Laban (2016–2018); Liberal (2009–2016); Lakas (2001–2009)
- Spouse: Dahlia Loyola
- Profession: Lawyer, politician

Roy Maulanin Loyola (born February 17, 1962) is a Filipino lawyer and politician serving as the representative of Cavite's 5th congressional district since 2022. He previously held the same position from 2010 to 2019, becoming the district's first representative following its creation in 2009. He also served multiple terms as mayor of Carmona, Cavite, both when it was still a municipality and during its transition into a city in 2023.

== Personal life ==
Loyola is married to Dahlia Loyola, who has also served as mayor and representative of Carmona and Cavite’s 5th District. He is related to Ara Loyola-Amores, who is the niece of his wife and an incumbent Councilor of the Municipality of Silang, Cavite.

== Political career ==
Member of the Commission on Appointments

Loyola served as a member of the Commission on Appointments, which administrates appointments made by the President. He was elected by the House of Representatives on the 20th Congress on February 12, 2024. He was officially replaced as a member of CA on June 18, 2026, during a special session, but was elected again on August 13, 2026.

=== Mayor of Carmona ===
Loyola was elected mayor of Carmona in 1995 and served until 2004. He returned to the post from 2007 to 2010 and again from 2019 to 2022. It was during his mayoralty in 1999 when Carmona was reapportioned from Cavite's 2nd District to form the new 5th District.

Several complaints were filed against him during his tenure, but these were dismissed by the Office of the Ombudsman in 2002. A separate legal challenge questioning the validity of his appointments was rejected by the Supreme Court in 2011.

=== House of Representatives ===
In 2010, Loyola was elected as the first representative of Cavite’s newly created 5th District. He served three consecutive terms until 2019. He returned to Congress in 2022 after his wife, Dahlia Loyola, completed her term.

In Congress, Loyola pushed for the conversion of Carmona into a component city, which was achieved in 2023.

He was among the 39 members of the House Committee on Justice who voted in favor of the impeachment complaints against Ombudsman Merceditas Gutierrez in 2011. He also voted in favor of the death penalty bill in 2017, the absolute divorce bill in 2024, and the revocation of the franchise renewal of Sonshine Media Network International in 2024.
