= Dagupan Bus Company =

Bus company in the Philippines

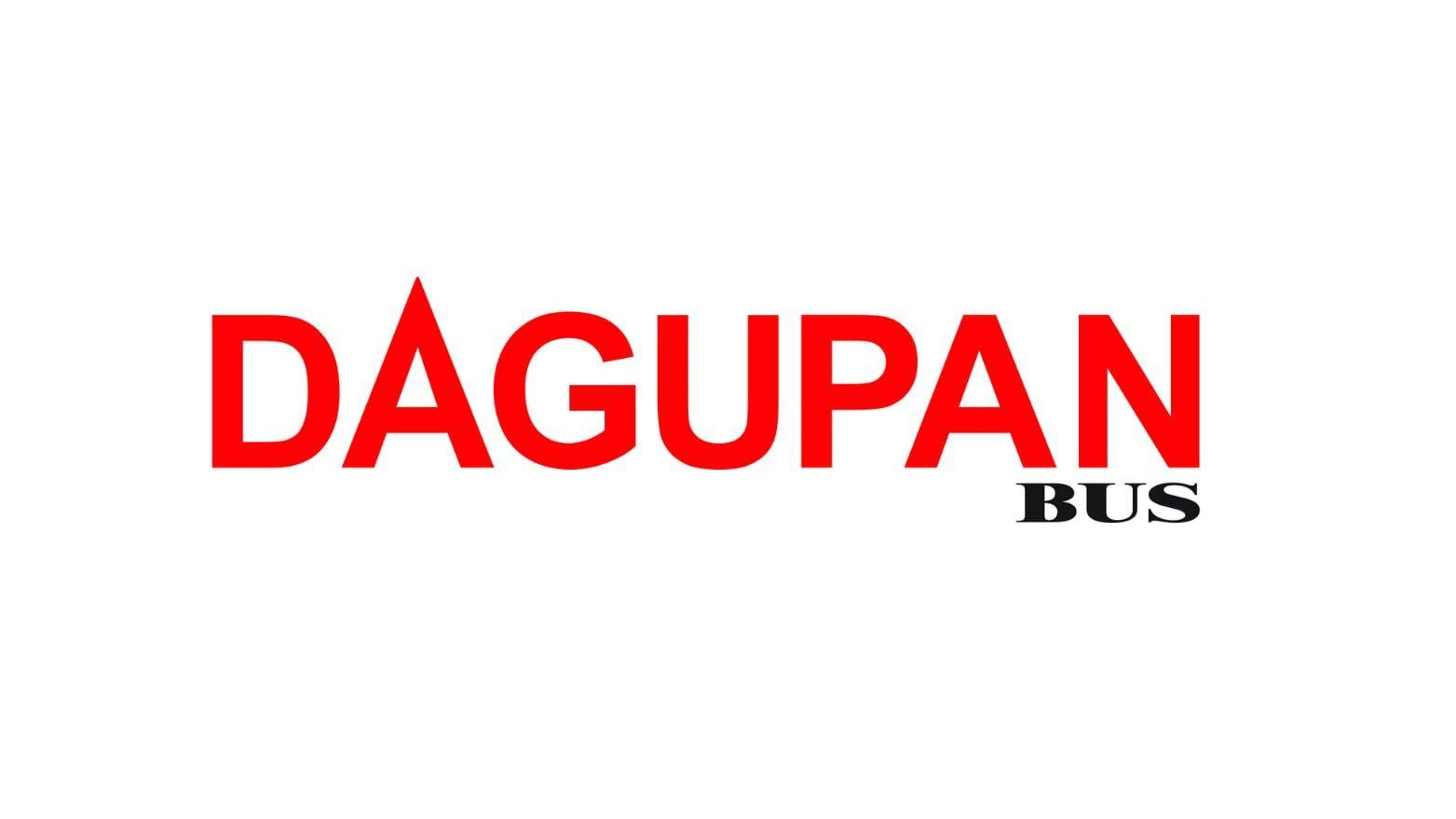

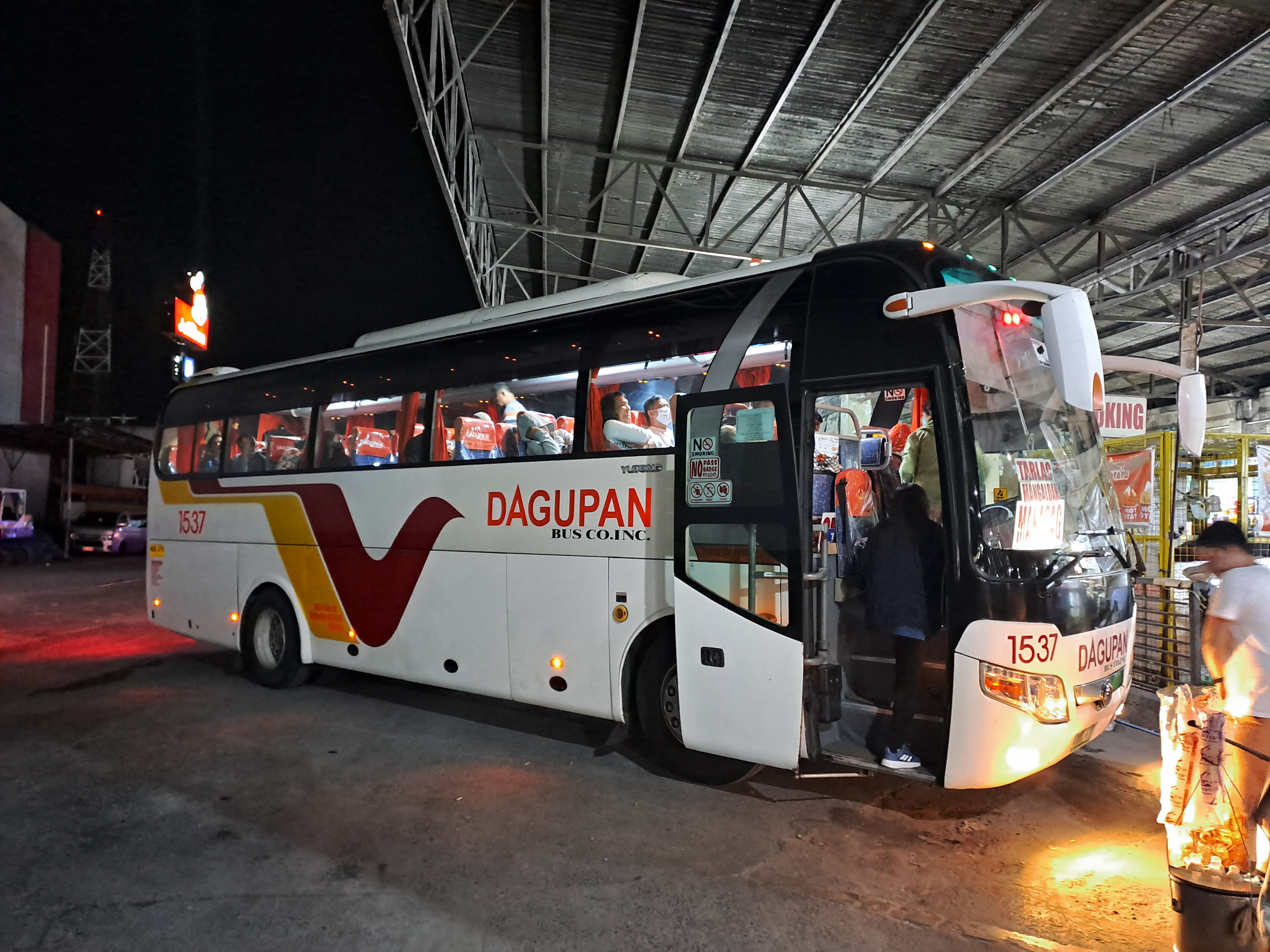
- A regular aircon bus of Dagupan Bus Company at Dau Bus Terminal, Mabalacat, Pampanga
- Founded: 1974; 52 years ago
- Successor: North Genesis (Metro Manila–Baguio)
- Headquarters: EDSA cor. New York St., Cubao, Quezon City, Philippines
- Area served: Pangasinan; Central Luzon; Metro Manila
- Parent: JAC Liner (since 2015)
- Subsidiaries: Saulog Transit (until 2015)

Dagupan Bus Company is a provincial bus company in the Philippines. Its name was derived from the city of Dagupan in Pangasinan. It is now a subsidiary of JAC Liner following Dagupan Bus' sellout in 2015.

== History ==
Dagupan Bus Co., Inc. started its operation in 1974 when they acquired the franchise of Villarey Transit, also a provincial bus company with only six Mitsubishi Fuso buses, through Saulog Transit Inc. to be able to expand its operation to Northern Luzon.

=== Issues and Controversies ===
In 1996, The Quezon City Regional Trial Court issued the writ of preliminary injunction against the Saulog group of companies who attempted to sell their stocks to other bus companies.

Another controversy regarding Saulog Transit Inc. and Dagupan Bus Co., Inc. was a conflict which sparked between the Saulog stakeholders after the assassinations of their ancestors. Eliseo Saulog, the founder of Saulog Transit Inc. and father of the Saulog children, Ignacio Saulog, Luciano Saulog, Teodoro Saulog, Virginia Saulog, Dr. Melquiades Saulog, Maura Saulog-Aguinaldo, Lilia Saulog-Venturina, and Dr. Marietta Saulog-Vergara, was shot and killed in 1960 by an unidentified gunman, while the family patriarch, Ruben Saulog, father of the current chief executive and one of the eight children of the founder, was also assassinated in 1990. Until then, the case of such killings were still uncertain and unresolved. The attempts to sell the two companies were assured by the lawyer Bernard Saulog, who got 75% of the total ₱1.4 B assets, while the remaining 25% were given to the rest of the clan members. Unfortunately, Teodoro Saulog and his clan members refused to give up Saulog Transit Inc. and Dagupan Bus Co., Inc.

In 2014, Dagupan Bus Co., Inc together with Mt. Province Cable Tours sold their franchises to G.V. Florida Transport for their routes in Baguio to areas within Benguet and Mountain Province. A "private transaction" was entered into by the said companies, and the franchise rights were failed to be transferred from Dagupan Bus and Mt. Province Cable Tours to G.V. Florida. The said "private transaction" was not honored by the Land Transportation Franchising and Regulatory Board (LTFRB), and was never known of, until February 2013, where one of their units fell into a ravine, killing 15 of its passengers. It resulted to them being suspended for 30 days and paying for damages.

=== Sellout to JAC Liner and Genesis Transport ===
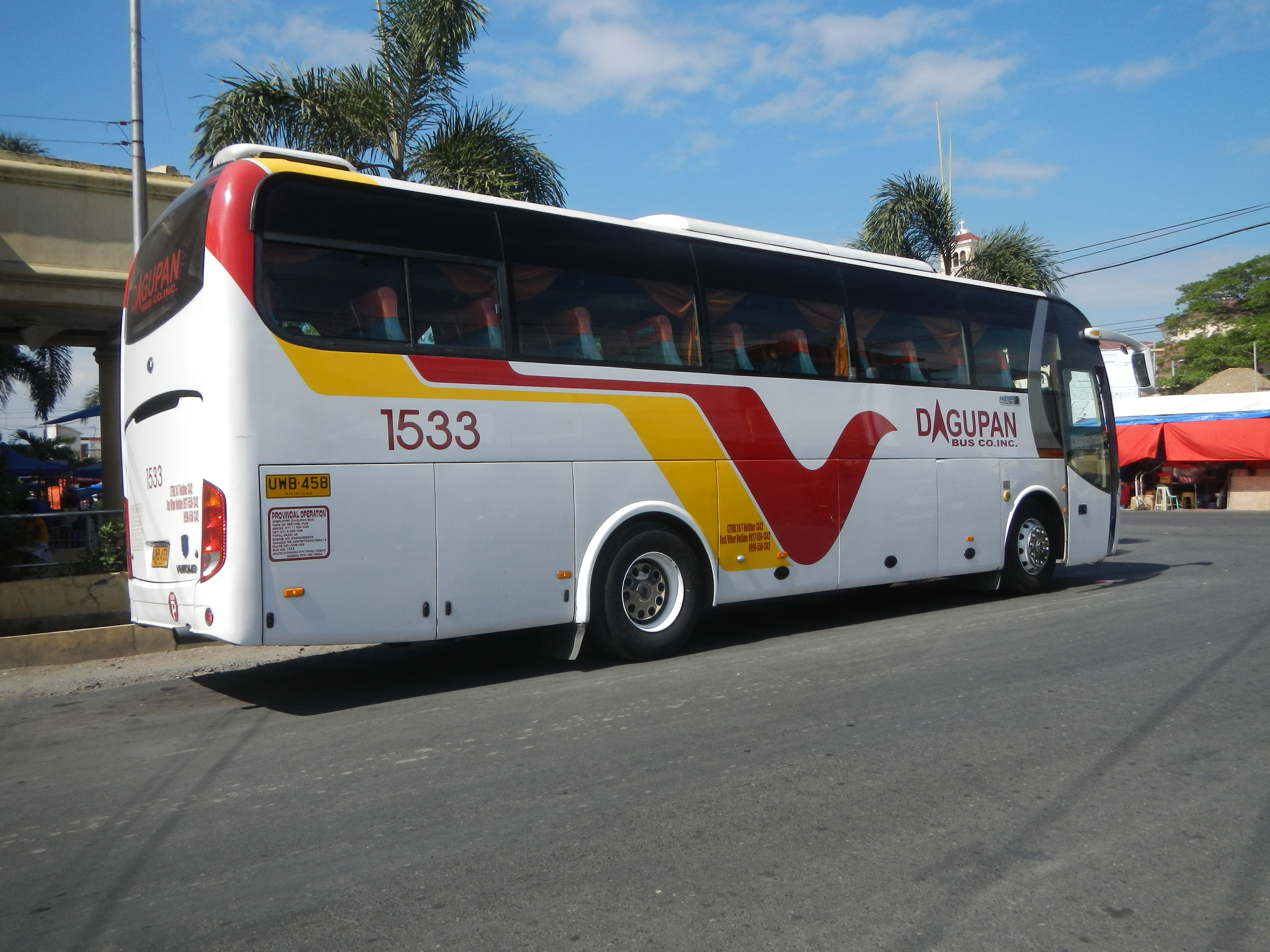
A Dagupan Bus painted with JAC Liner's livery, a result to Dagupan Bus Co, Inc. 1533 soldout in 2015.

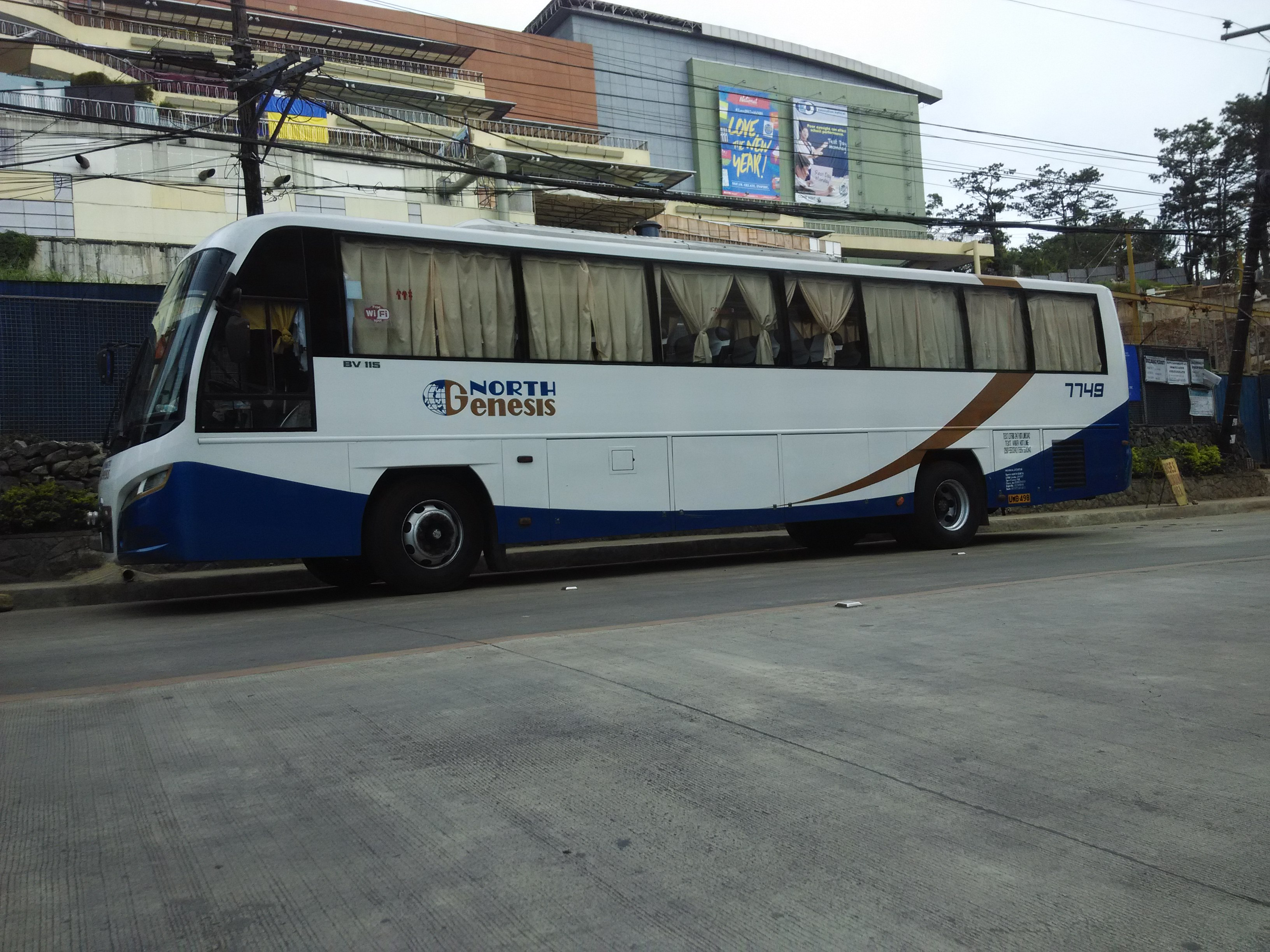
North Genesis 7749 at SM City Baguio, a former bus unit of Dagupan Bus.

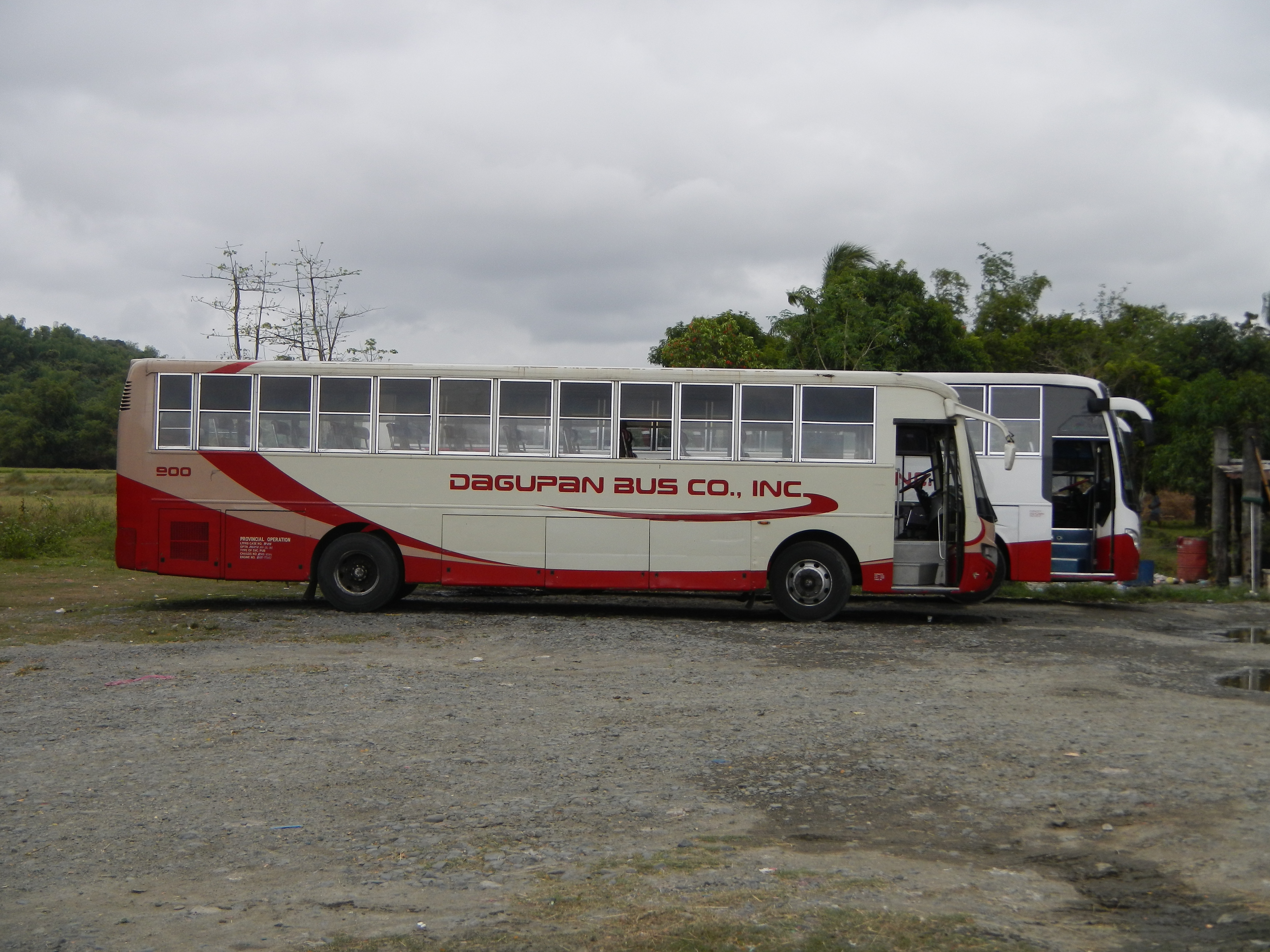
A Hino RK1J bus of Dagupan Bus with the company's final livery before the sold-out in 2015.

On December 1, 2010 Genesis Transport Service acquired Saulog Transit where they both signed a memorandum of agreement for the long-time cooperation and allocation of the franchise of the former. Genesis Transport answered all of the assets of Saulog Transit when it was found out that the Saulog clan was unable to shoulder all of the annual employees' contributions to the Social Security System, Home Development Mutual Fund (Pag-Ibig), and PhilHealth. Hence, Saulog Transit and Dagupan Bus Co., Inc. acquired new bus units.

In 2015, JAC Liner Inc. and Genesis Transport took over the management of Dagupan Bus. The Pangasinan routes of Dagupan Bus were acquired by JAC Liner but retained the "Dagupan Bus" name, while Genesis Transport took over their Baguio route under the name North Genesis.

In May 2025, JAC Liner subsidiary Pangasinan Solid North Transit had its operations suspended for a month after one of its buses namely PSNTI bus no. 1513, a Dagupan Bus Co. unit operating under PSNTI caused a multiple-vehicle collision at the SCTEX toll plaza in Tarlac City, killing 10 people and injuring 37 others, with initial investigations suggesting the bus driver fell asleep. The Land Transportation Franchising and Regulatory Board (LTFRB) initially issued a 30-day suspension for 15 specific units of Dagupan Bus Co., which was quickly followed by a Department of Transportation (DOTr) order suspending the entire fleet of Pangasinan Solid North Transit, encompassing nearly 300 buses.

On October 6, 2025, it was announced that Dagupan Bus would resume their trips between Cubao and Manaoag.

== Fleet ==
After their sell-out in 2015, Dagupan Bus has these units:

- Yutong ZK6122HD9
- Yutong ZK6119H2
- Yutong ZK6119HA
- Yutong ZK6107HA
- DMMC DM 12 Hino RM2PSS
- Daewoo BV115
- Daewoo BS106
- Golden Dragon XML6103
- Golden Dragon XML6127
- Hyundai Universe Space Luxury Premium

Before their sold-out in 2015, Dagupan Bus used to have these units:

- Hino RK1JST
- Hino RF821
- Santarosa NV Nissan Diesel (Ordinary Fare unit)
- Nissan Diesel Euro RB46S

== Terminals ==
These are the combined terminals of Dagupan Bus and Pangasinan Solid North Transit

=== Metro Manila ===
- Dagupan Bus Terminal, EDSA Cubao, Pinagkaisahan, Quezon City
- Solid North Terminal, EDSA Cubao, Immaculate Concepcion, Quezon City

=== Provincial ===
- Solid North Terminal, Perez Boulevard, Downtown District, Dagupan, Pangasinan
- Solid North Terminal, Perez Boulevard, Poblacion, San Carlos, Pangasinan
- Solid North Terminal, N. Garcia Road, Poblacion, Manaoag, Pangasinan

== Destinations ==
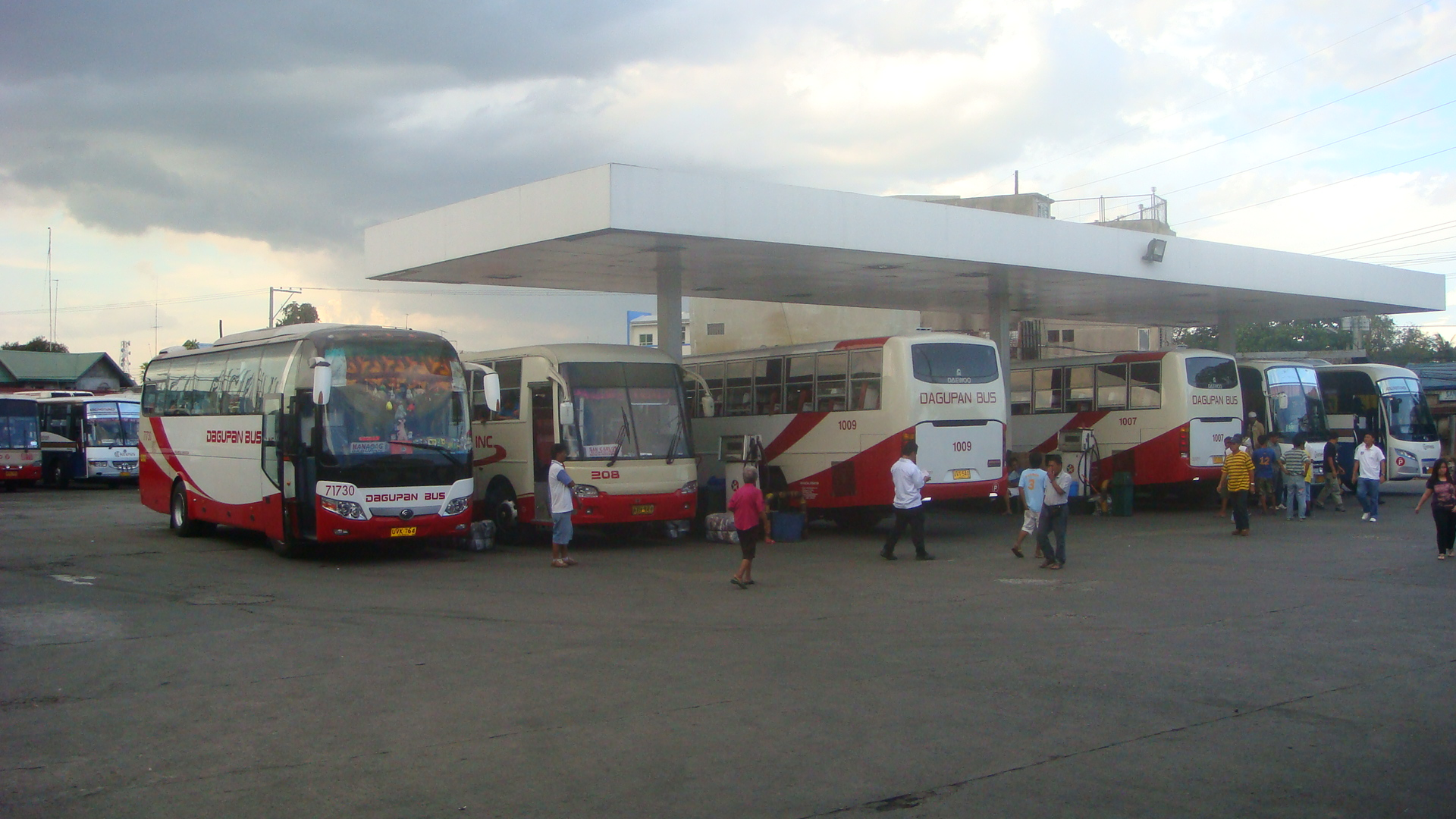
Dagupan Buses in Tarlac City, Tarlac

Metro Manila

- Cubao, Quezon City
- Avenida, Santa Cruz, Manila

Provincial

- Mabalacat, Pampanga (Dau Bus Terminal)
- Tarlac City, Tarlac
- Dagupan City, Pangasinan
- San Carlos City, Pangasinan
- Manaoag, Pangasinan

== Former destinations ==
- Tuao, Cagayan
- Piat, Cagayan
- Tuguegarao, Cagayan
- Roxas, Isabela
- Ilagan, Isabela
- Santiago, Isabela
- Maddela, Quirino
- Solano, Nueva Vizcaya
- Baguio, Benguet
- San Fabian, Pangasinan
- San Nicolas, Pangasinan
- Natividad, Pangasinan
- San Quintin, Pangasinan
- Agno, Pangasinan
- Anda, Pangasinan (inactive since 2015)
- Bolinao, Pangasinan
- Alaminos, Pangasinan
- Lingayen, Pangasinan
- Araneta City Bus Port, Cubao, Quezon City
- Pasay

== See also ==
- List of bus companies of the Philippines
