= Saulog =

Saulog may refer to:

- Irene Gay Saulog
- Saulog Transit

== See also ==
- Saul og David
