= Saulog Transit =

Bus company in the Philippines

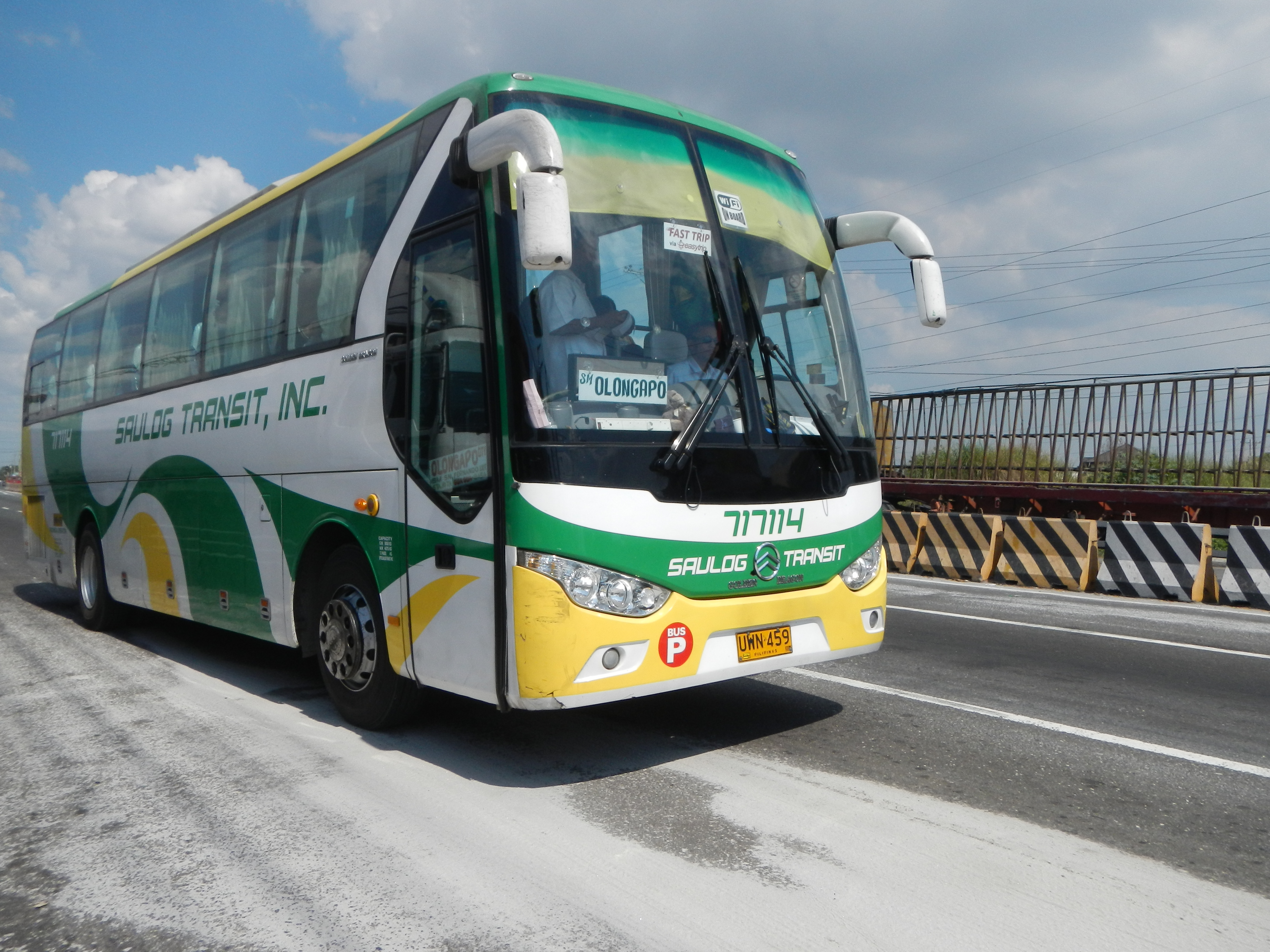
- Parent: Genesis Transport (December 1, 2010–present)
- Founded: 1946; 80 years ago
- Headquarters: 1377 Quirino Avenue, San Dionisio, Parañaque
- Locale: Luzon
- Service area: Metro Manila; Central Luzon; Cavite
- Service type: Provincial & City Operation
- Stations: Avenida; Cavite City; Naic; Ternate; Cubao; Olongapo
- Fleet: 200+
- Operator: Saulog Transit, Inc.

Saulog Transit Inc. is a bus company operating in the Philippines. It is owned by Genesis Transport, servicing provincial routes between Metro Manila, Cavite and Central Luzon.

== Etymology ==
Saulog Transit was named after its founder, the late Eliseo Basa Saulog. Eliseo was called Sayong by those close to him and Don Eliseo to everyone else. His wife was the pride of Malagasang 1st, Imus, Cavite, Philippines no other than Nieves Arguelles. They had nine children as follows: Ignacio, Luciano, Teodoro, Virginia, Dr. Melquiades, Ruben, Maura Saulog-Aguinaldo, Lilia Saulog-Venturina and Dr. Marietta Saulog-Vergara.

== History ==
The company started operation in 1946 with orange yellow, silver, and dark green bus paint designs. In 1974, Saulog Transit Inc. acquired the franchise of Villarey Transit, which it used to operate its sister company, Dagupan Bus Company initially with only six Mitsubishi Fuso buses as part of its expansion in Northern Luzon.

=== Issues and controversies ===
Due to some complaints made by some Manilan commuters regarding the entering of provincial buses from Cavite, Laguna, Batangas, and Quezon provinces, Manila Mayor Alfredo Lim issued a memorandum known as Executive Order 13, prohibiting all provincial buses from Southern Tagalog region to enter Manila except for some cases like those coming from Northern Luzon, Bicol Region or Visayas. Another scenario also happened for the second time during Lim's second term as mayor, just to decongest traffic along Taft Avenue. The company also has been accused of breaking municipal rules by picking up passengers at stops other than its designated terminals.

The Quezon City Regional Trial Court issued the writ of preliminary injunction against the Saulog group of companies who attempted to sell their stocks to other bus companies.

Another controversy regarding Saulog Transit and Dagupan Bus Company was that a conflict sparked between the Saulog stakeholders after the assassinations of their ancestors. Eliseo Saulog, the founder of Saulog Transit, was shot and killed in 1960 by an unidentified gunman, while the family patriarch, Ruben Saulog, father of the current chief executive and one of the eight children of the founder, was also assassinated in 1990. Until then, the case of such killings are still uncertain and unresolved. The attempts to sell the two companies were assured by the lawyer Bernard Saulog, who got 75% of the total P1.4 B assets, while 25% of the remaining assets were given to the rest of the clan members. Teodoro Saulog and his clan members refused to give up Saulog Transit and Dagupan Bus Company.

On December 1, 2010, Genesis Transport acquired Saulog Transit where they both signed a memorandum of agreement for the long-time cooperation and allocation of the franchise of the former. Genesis Transport answered all of its assets of Saulog Transit when it was found out that the Saulog clan was unable to shoulder all of the annual contributions to SSS, Pag-ibig and PhilHealth. Hence, Saulog Transit and Dagupan Bus Company acquired new bus units.

== Fleet ==
Saulog Transit Inc., like other major bus companies, has modernized its fleet. Some of its buses are equipped with automatic transmission (GM Allison Automatic Transmission), particularly their engine-powered buses. As of now, the company is now utilizing the following:

- Yutong ZK6107HA (inactive in service)
- Yutong ZK6119HA (inactive in service)
- Zhongtong LCK6118H "Elegance"
- Zhongtong LCK6116H "Legend"
- Zhongtong LCK6125G (Low Entry) "Fashion"
- Zhongtong LCK6119H "H11"
- Golden Dragon XML6127 (Marcopolo)
- Golden Dragon XML6102 "Splendor"
- Golden Dragon XML6103
- Golden Dragon XML6122J18 "Triumph"
- Golden Dragon XML6122J15 "Tourism Coach & Intercity" (Triumph Series)
- DMMW DM16S2 Volvo B7R

== Fleet numbering ==
The fleet numbers use 5 or 6 digits and their first 3 digits use 717 in all buses (e.g., 717** & 717***).

== Destinations ==
=== Metro Manila ===
- Cubao, Quezon City
- EDSA, Pasay
- Avenida, Manila*
- Parañaque Integrated Terminal Exchange, Parañaque*
- Balintawak, Quezon City

=== Provincial destinations ===
- Olongapo*
- Guagua, Pampanga*
- Lubao, Pampanga*
- San Fernando, Pampanga*
- Cavite City, Cavite
- Naic, Cavite
- Ternate, Cavite

(*) denotes routes had trips from Cavite City

== Former destinations ==
- Baguio
- Tarlac City, Tarlac
- Mabalacat, Pampanga (Dau Bus Terminal)
- Dagupan, Pangasinan
- Manaoag, Pangasinan
- San Carlos, Pangasinan
- Plaza Lawton, Manila
- Iba, Zambales
- Santa Cruz, Zambales
- Cabanatuan
- San Jose, Nueva Ecija
- Bacoor
- Mendez, Cavite
- Tagaytay, Cavite

== See also ==
- List of bus companies of the Philippines
