= San Carlos, Pangasinan =

Component city in Pangasinan, Philippines

San Carlos
- Component city
- City of San Carlos
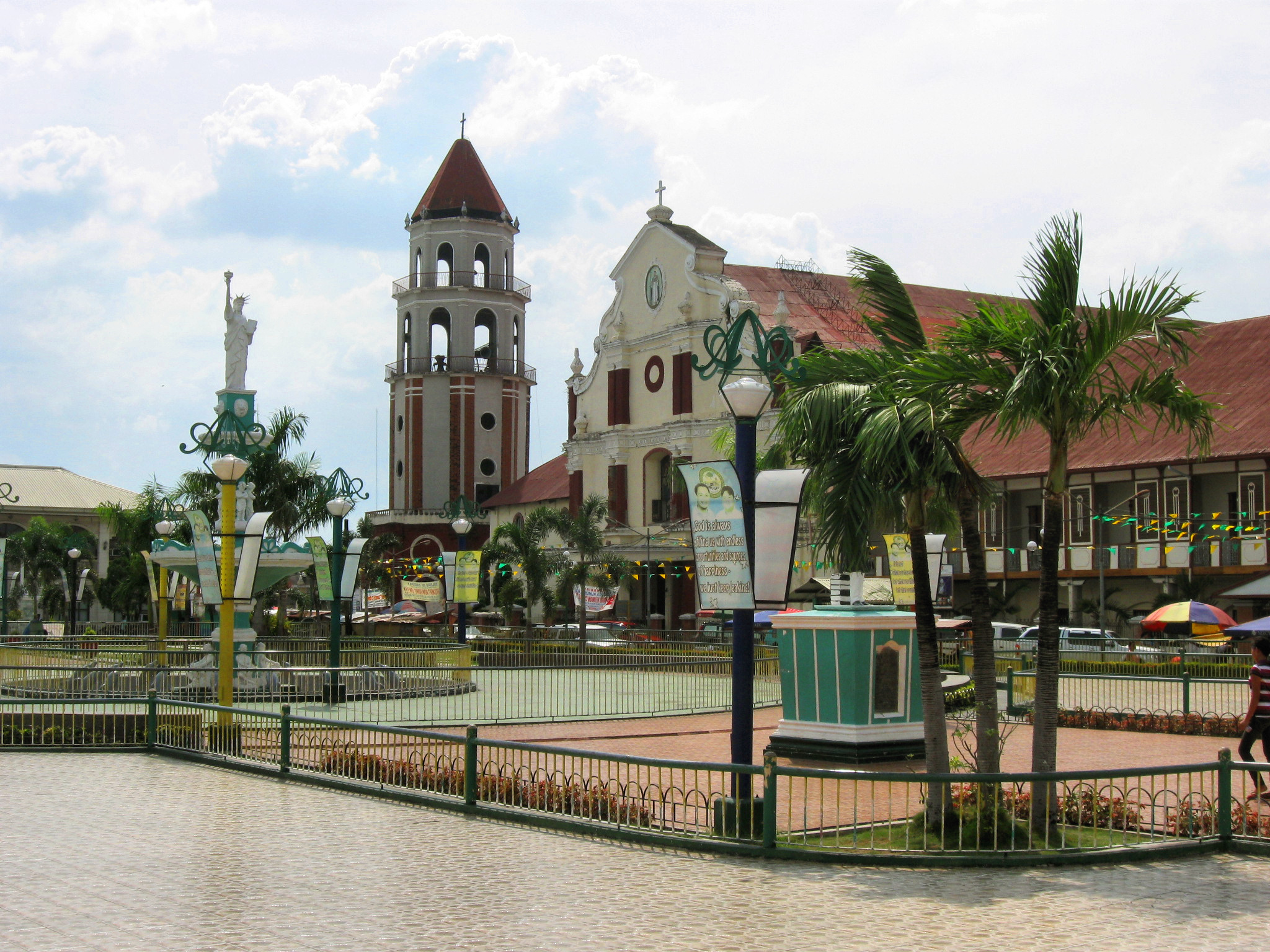
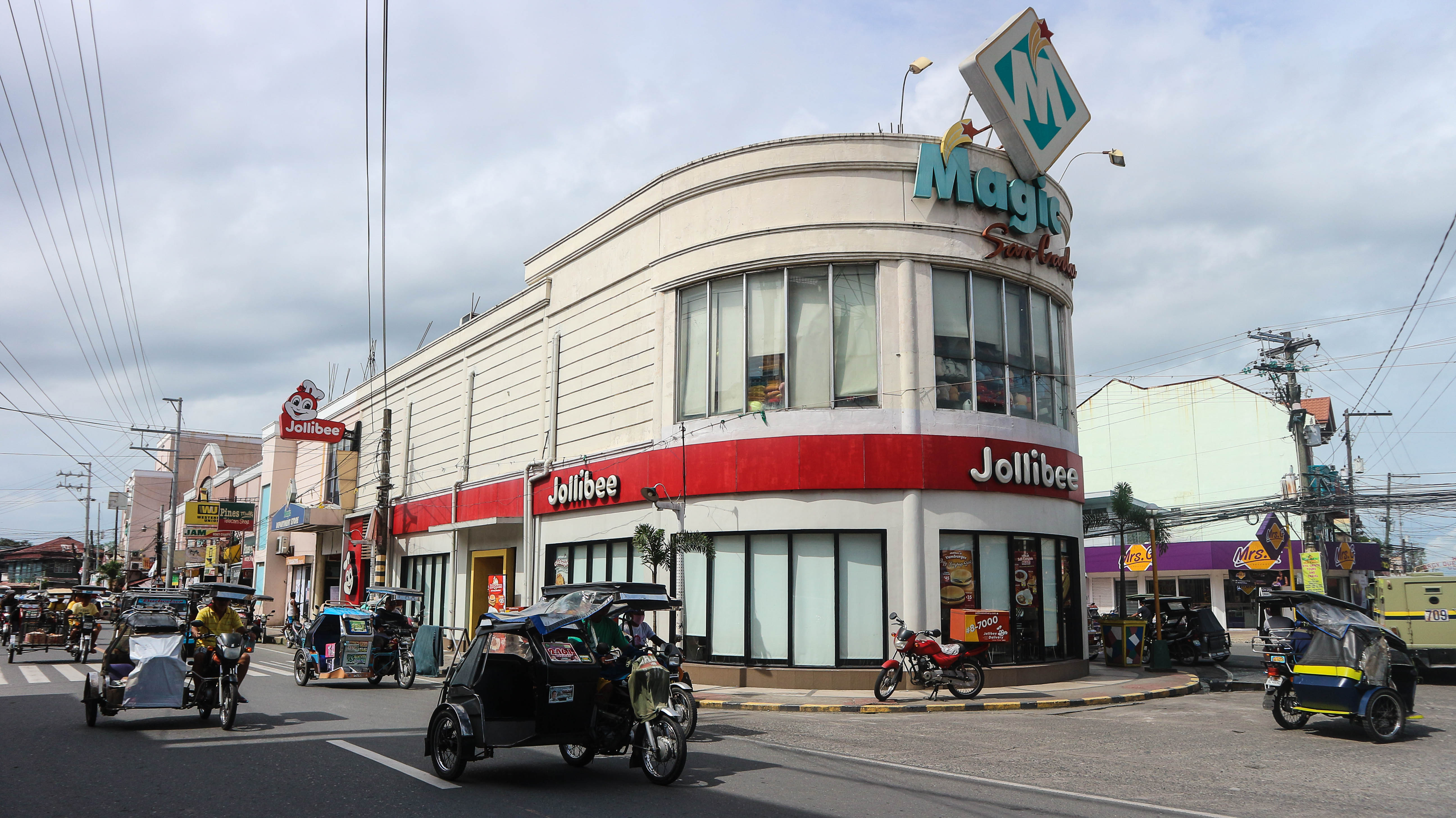
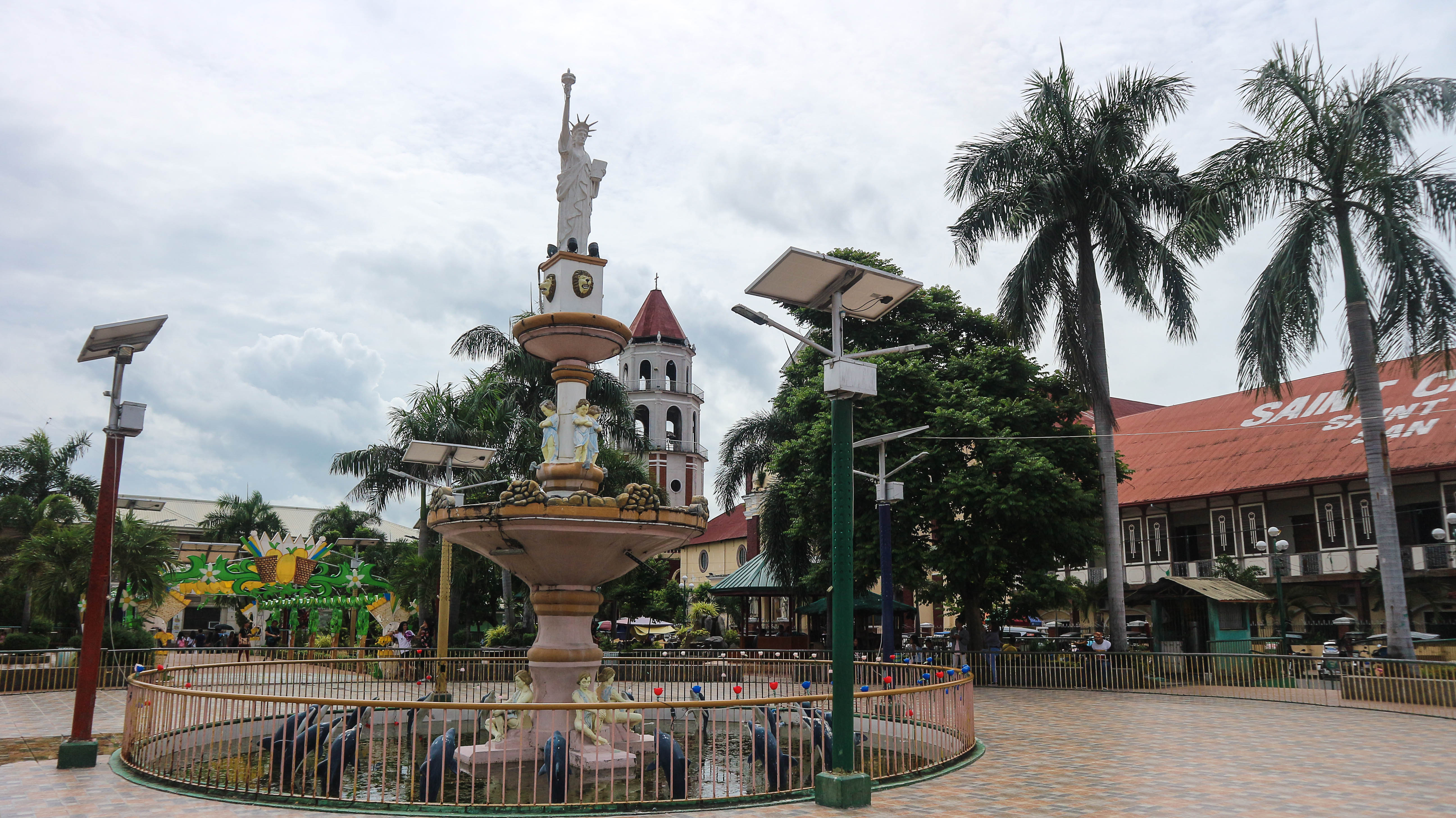
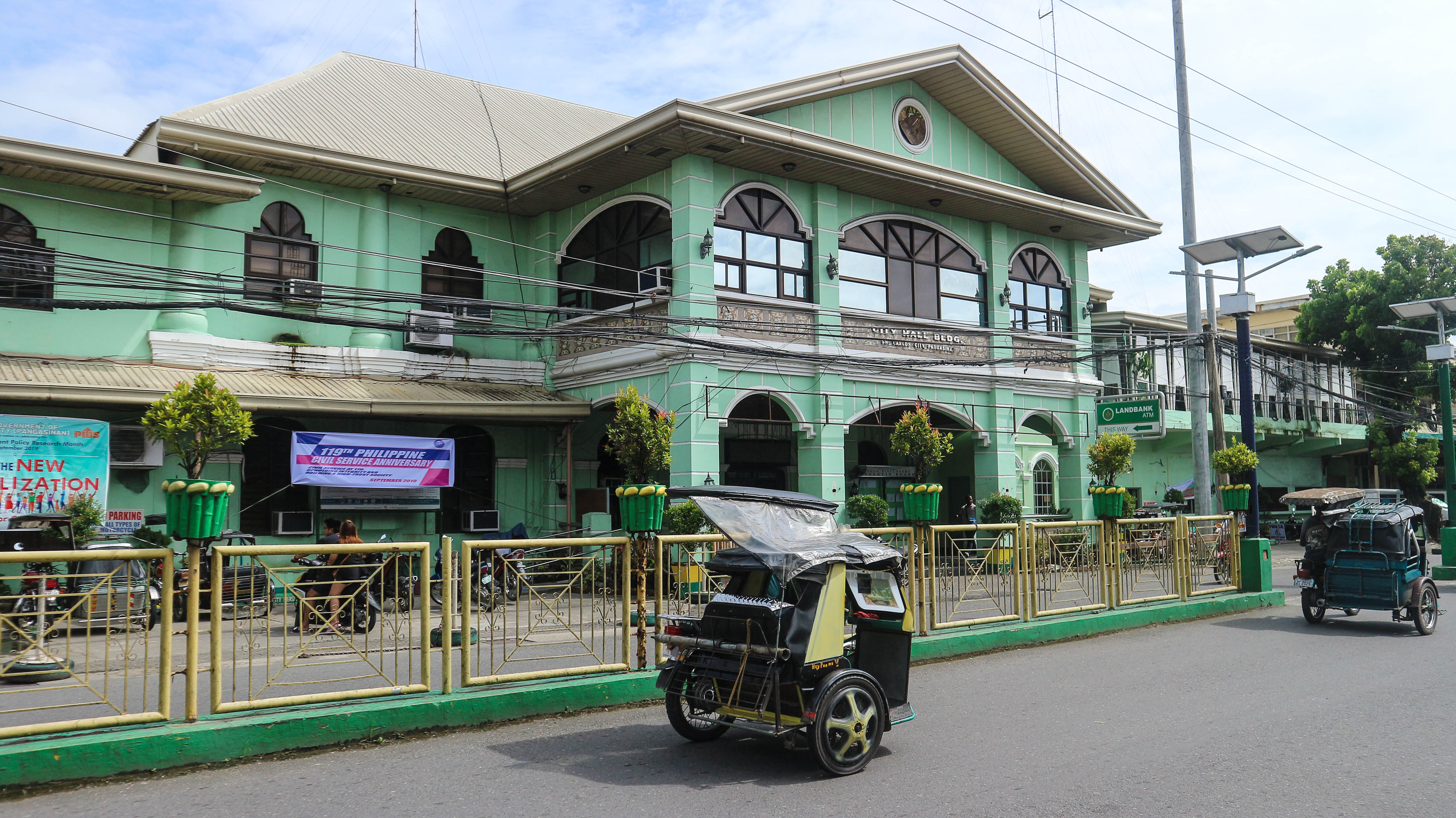
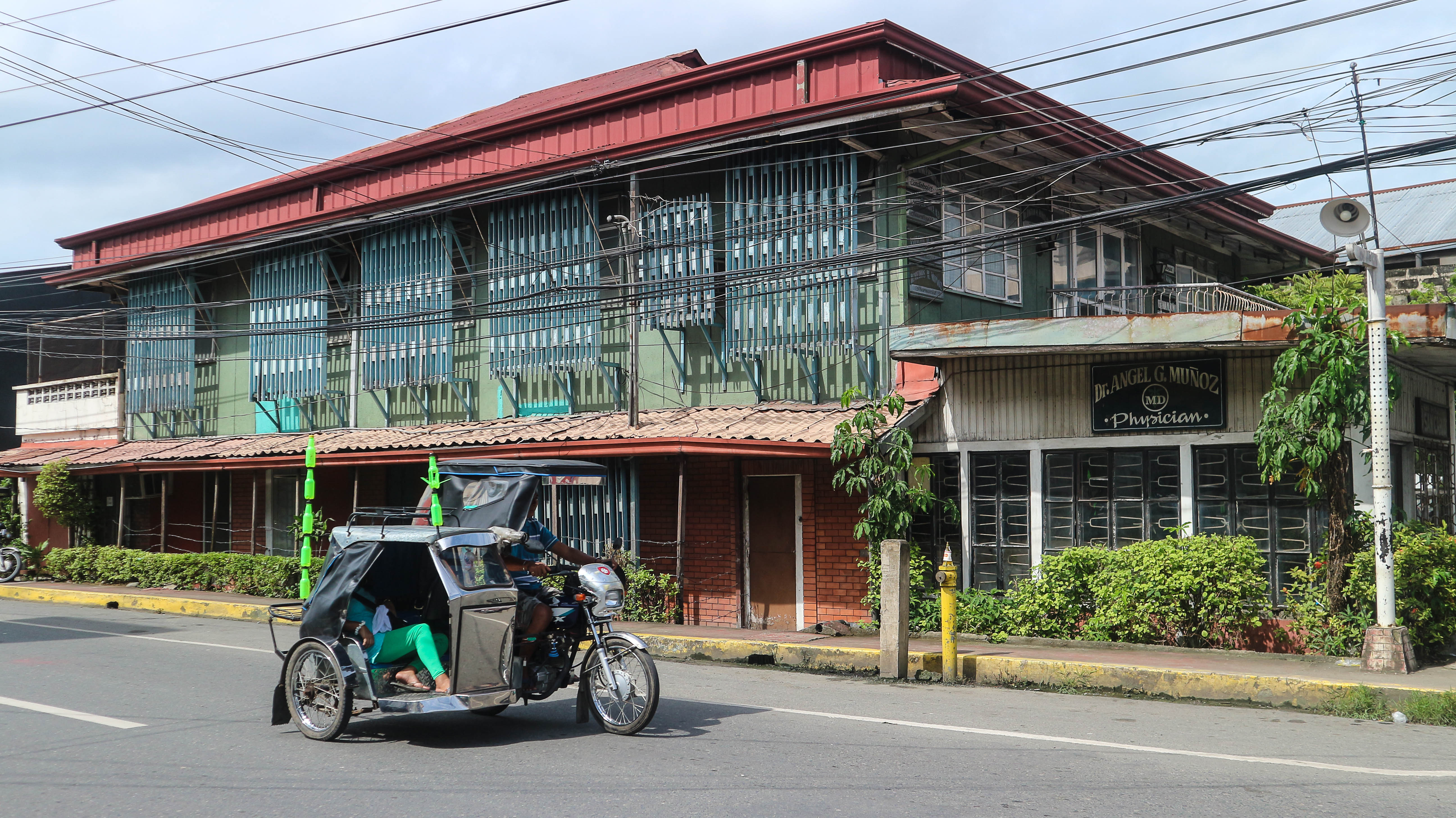
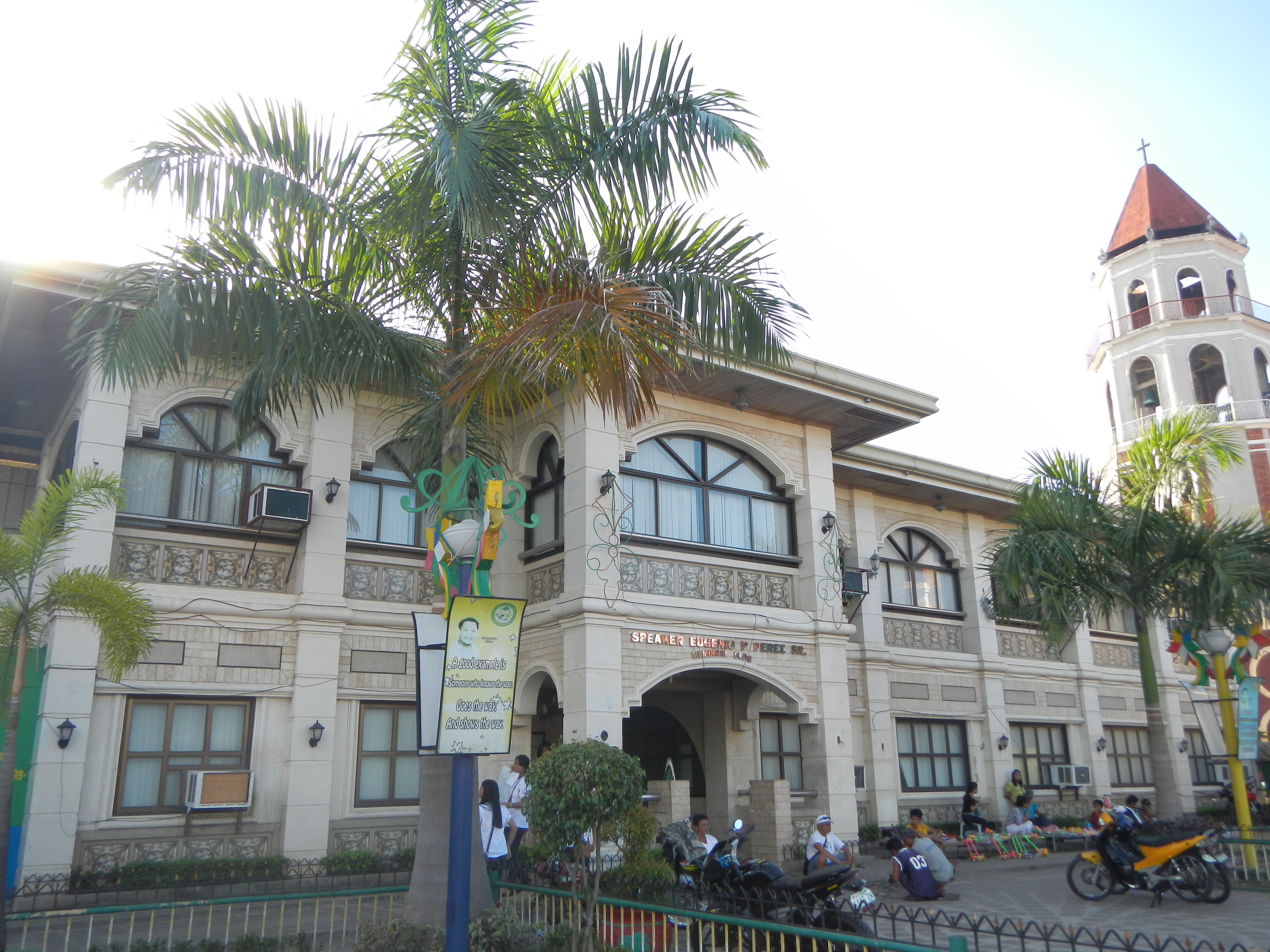
- Clockwise from top: San Carlos Basilica, San Carlos City Park, Ancestral house in San Carlos City, Speaker Eugenio P. Perez Sr. Memorial Building, San Carlos City Hall, and Downtown Area

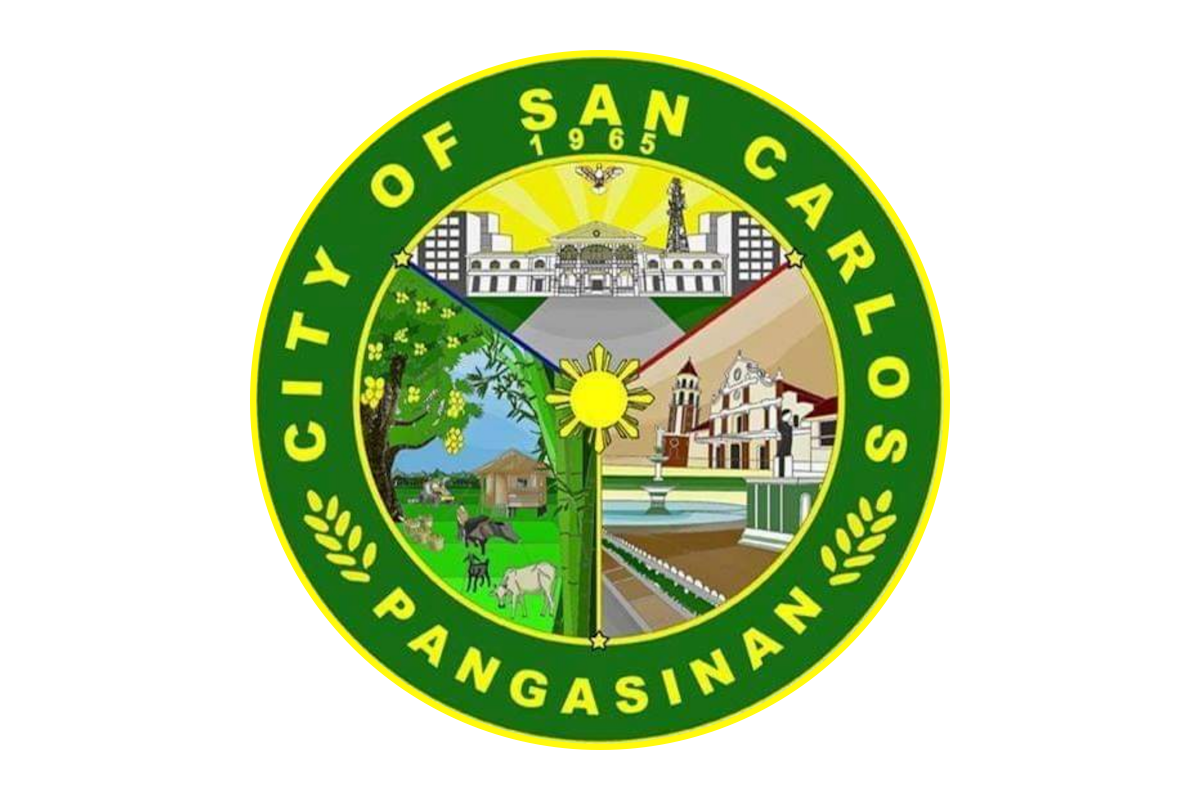
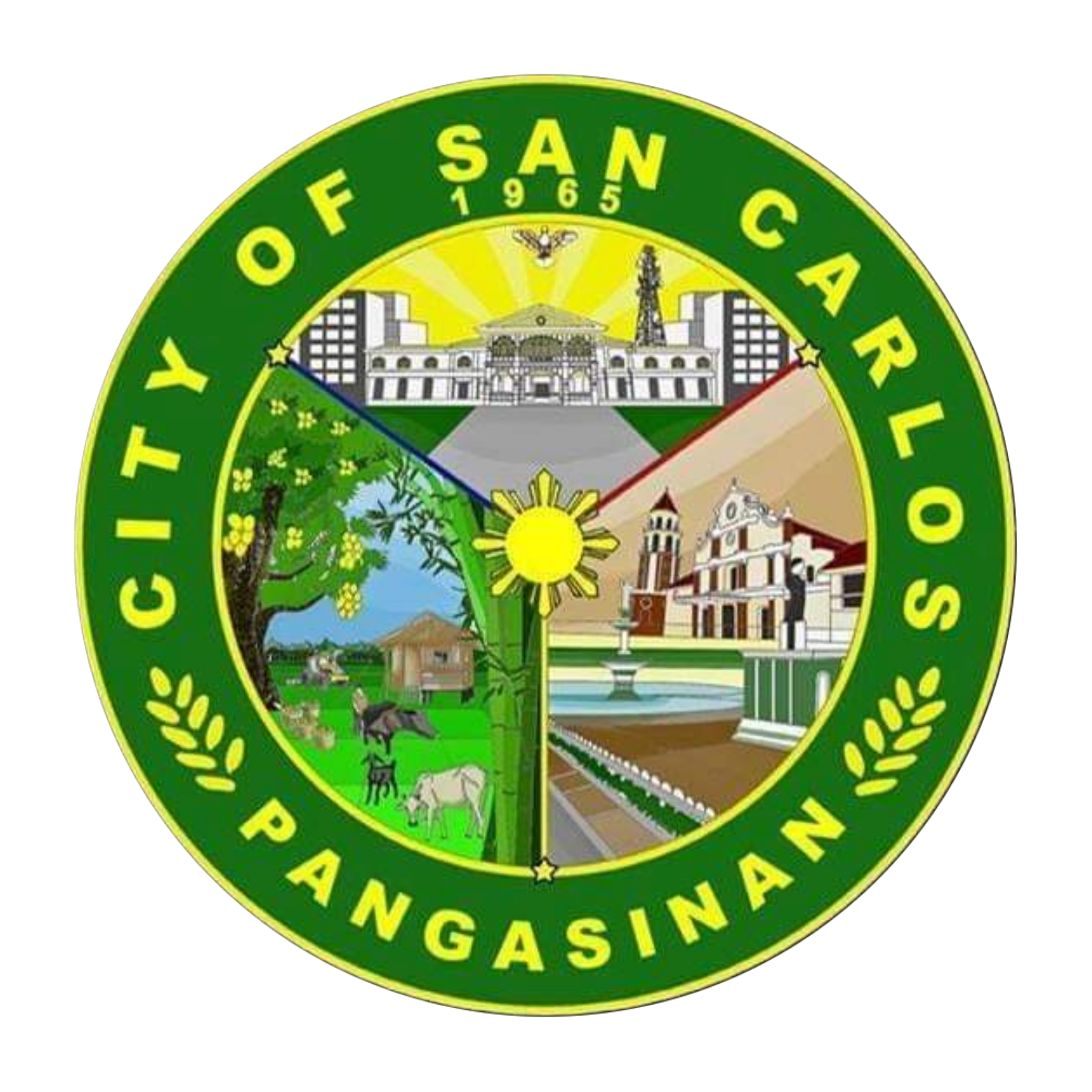
- Flag Seal
- Nicknames: Heart of Pangasinan; Linguistical center of the Pangasinan language
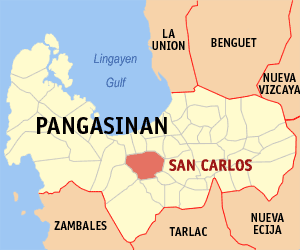
- Map of Pangasinan with San Carlos highlighted
- Interactive map of San Carlos
- Location within the Philippines
- Coordinates: 15°55′41″N 120°20′56″E
- Country: Philippines
- Region: Ilocos Region
- Province: Pangasinan
- District: 3rd district
- Founded: 1578
- Cityhood: January 1, 1966
- Named for: Charles III of Spain
- Barangays: 86 (see Barangays)

Government
  - Type: Sangguniang Panlungsod
  - Mayor: Julier C. Resuello
  - Vice Mayor: Joseres S. Resuello
  - Representative: Maria Rachel J. Arenas
  - City Council: Members: Elpidio R. Fermin Jr.; Joshua G. Resuello; Ruby D. Ballesteros; Eduardo R. Garcia; Jack Lester P. Soriano; Carmina D. Paningbatan; Alberto S. Castro; Generoso D. Tulagan Jr.; Christian Carlo A. Cancino; Samuel C. Millora
  - Electorate: 126,193 voters (2025)

Area
  - Total: 169.03 km^{2} (65.26 sq mi)
- Elevation: 12 m (39 ft)
- Highest elevation: 172 m (564 ft)
- Lowest elevation: 0 m (0 ft)

Population (2024 census)
  - Total: 208,330
  - Density: 1,232.5/km^{2} (3,192.2/sq mi)
  - Households: 47,785

Economy
  - Income class: 2nd city income class
  - Poverty incidence: 14.87% (2023)
  - Revenue: ₱ 1,286 million (2024)
  - Assets: ₱ 4,352 million (2024)
  - Expenditure: ₱ 1,037 million (2024)
  - Liabilities: ₱ 959.5 million (2024)

Service provider
  - Electricity: Central Pangasinan Electric Cooperative (CENPELCO)
- Time zone: UTC+8 (PST)
- ZIP code: 2420
- PSGC: 0105532000
- IDD : area code: +63 (0)75
- Native languages: Pangasinan; Ilocano; Tagalog
- Website: sancarloscitypangasinan.gov.ph

San Carlos, officially the City of San Carlos (Pangasinan: Siyudad na San Carlos; Ilocano: Siudad ti San Carlos; Filipino: Lungsod ng San Carlos), is a component city in the province of Pangasinan, Philippines. According to the 2024 census, it has a population of 208,330 people. It is the most populated city in Pangasinan and the entire Ilocos Region.

== Etymology ==
San Carlos, formerly known as Binalatongan, experienced significant historical events that influenced its name change. In 1660, a revolt led by Andres Malong, and later another insurrection in 1762 headed by Juan dela Cruz Palaris, culminated in humiliating defeats for the Spanish colonial forces. These uprisings prompted King Carlos III of Spain to order the destruction of Binalatongan. Following this directive, the town was razed and subsequently renamed San Carlos, which remains to be its name today. The renaming served both as a punitive measure and as a means to establish a new order in the aftermath of the rebellions.

== History ==
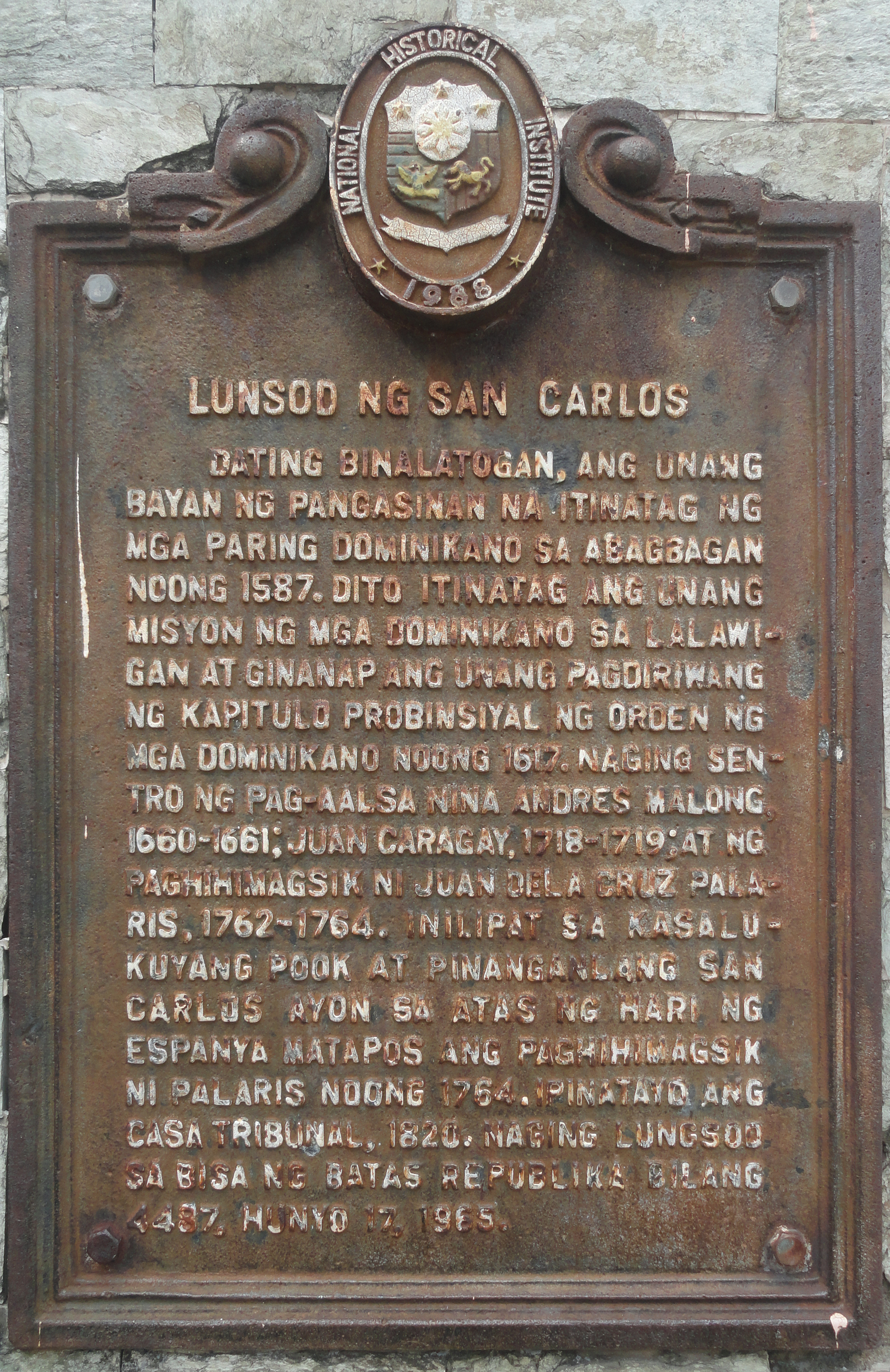
National historical marker installed at the city plaza in 1988

=== Spanish colonial era ===
==== Origins ====
San Carlos, originally known as Binalatongan, was inhabited by the San Carlenians. They spoke Cabuloan, the original Pangasinan dialect. The San Carlenians were known for their staunch adherence to their beliefs and practices, leading to frequent conflicts with the Augustinian friars. These clashes ultimately forced the Augustinians to abandon the area. However, the Dominicans later succeeded where the Augustinians had failed, establishing San Carlos as a Christian community.

The town's history is marked by significant uprisings led by prominent local figures. Andrés Malong and Juan de la Cruz Palaris are two of the most notable leaders. Palaris, whose real name was Pantaleon Perez, earned his moniker due to his agility and skill in native fencing, known as esgrima de mano. He spearheaded a revolt against the Spanish authorities in 1762, which lasted for two years and spread across Pangasinan. His resistance against excessive tribute and forced labor led to the establishment of an independent government based in Binalatongan.

==== Revolts ====
The first significant revolt in the area occurred in 1660, led by Andrés Malong. In 1718, during a minor uprising led by Juan Caragay, the church and its convent were set on fire, prompting the relocation of the Población east of the San Juan River. This transfer occurred on November 4, 1718, coinciding with the feast of Saint Charles Borromeo, leading to the settlement being renamed San Carlos Binalatongan.

==== Royal Decree and Final Renaming ====
In 1763, during another revolt led by Juan dela Cruz Palaris, the convent and the church of Saint Dominic were once again set ablaze. This event led King Charles III of Spain to issue a decree relocating the site to a place then known as "Lucban." The town's major involvement in these uprisings resulted in a royal mandate to rename the town after the Spanish monarch, thus the name San Carlos as the official title became by now definite, with Binalatongan now dropped from its title.

From its foundation until 1764, the poblacion and the church were relocated several times within the town's present boundaries. The initial site was on the western bank of the Agno River near the Zambales Mountains, likely within the town of Aguilar. It was later moved to the eastern side of the river, within the present barangay Mabalbalino, where it remained through the second half of the 18th century.

The town's history includes its name change from Binalatongan to San Carlos, reflecting its development and role in the region's history.

=== Philippine independence ===
During the 1960s, the Municipality of San Carlos was divided into two precincts. In 1965, the smaller precinct became legally incorporated as the Municipality of Basista by virtue of Republic Act No. 4866.

=== Cityhood ===
In 1966, the larger precinct became legally incorporated as San Carlos City by virtue of Republic Act No. 4487.

=== Contemporary ===
On April 28, 2007, San Carlos City's former mayor, Julian V. Resuello, was assassinated during an event at the city's plaza. His own family was accused of being behind his assassination. He died two days later.

== Geography ==
San Carlos is situated 20.22 kilometres (12.56 mi) from the provincial capital Lingayen, and 203.47 kilometres (126.43 mi) from the country's capital city of Manila.

=== Barangays ===
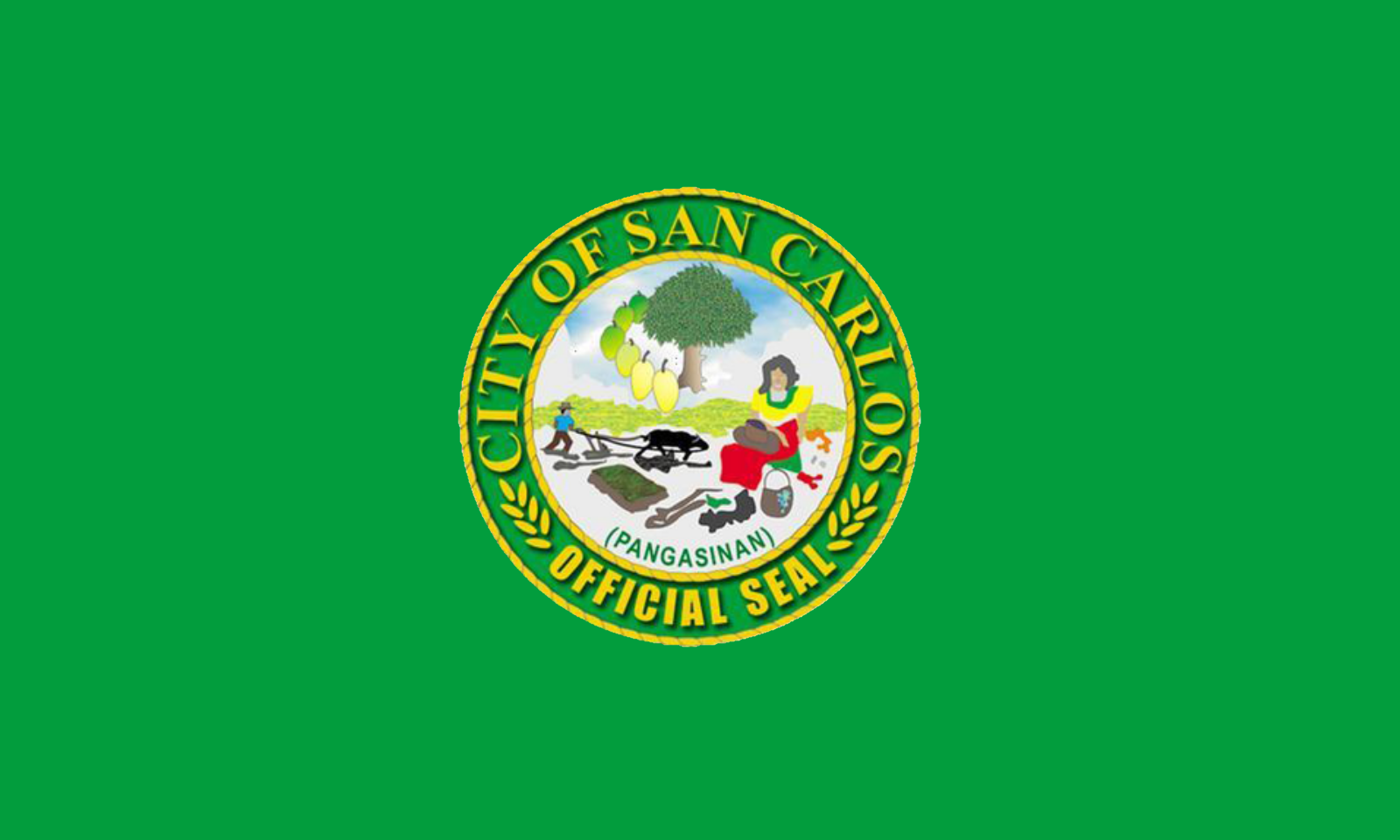
Former flag of San Carlos

Former seal of San Carlos

San Carlos is politically subdivided into 87 barangays. Each barangay consists of puroks and some have sitios.

- Abanon
- M.Soriano St. (Poblacion)
- Agdao
- Anando
- Antipangol
- Aponit
- Bacnar
- Balaya
- Balayong
- Baldog
- Balite Sur
- Balococ
- Bani
- Bega
- Bocboc
- Bugallon-Posadas Street (Poblacion)
- Bogaoan
- Bolingit
- Bolosan
- Bonifacio (Poblacion)
- Buenglat
- Burgos-Padlan (Poblacion)
- Cacaritan
- Caingal
- Calobaoan
- Calomboyan
- Capataan
- Caoayan-Kiling
- Cobol
- Coliling
- Cruz
- Doyong
- Gamata
- Guelew
- Ilang
- Inerangan
- Isla
- Libas
- Lilimasan
- Longos
- Lucban (Poblacion)
- Mabalbalino
- Mabini (Poblacion)
- Magtaking
- Malacañang
- Maliwara
- Mamarlao
- Manzon
- Matagdem
- Mestizo Norte
- Naguilayan
- Nelintap
- Padilla-Gomez (Poblacion)
- Pagal
- Palaming
- Palaris (Poblacion)
- Palospos
- Pangalangan
- Pangoloan
- Pangpang
- Paitan-Panoypoy
- Parayao
- Payapa
- Payar
- Perez Boulevard (Poblacion)
- PNR Site (Poblacion)
- Polo
- Quezon Boulevard (Poblacion)
- Quintong
- Rizal Avenue (Poblacion)
- Roxas Boulevard (Poblacion)
- Salinap
- San Juan
- San Pedro (Poblacion)
- Sapinit
- Supo
- Talang
- Taloy (Poblacion)
- Tamayo
- Tandoc
- Tarece
- Tarectec
- Tayambani
- Tebag
- Turac
- Ano
- Tandang Sora (Poblacion)

=== Climate ===
Climate data for San Carlos
Month	Jan	Feb	Mar	Apr	May	Jun	Jul	Aug	Sep	Oct	Nov	Dec	Year
Mean daily maximum °C (°F)	31 (88)	31 (88)	31 (88)	33 (91)	32 (90)	32 (90)	30 (86)	30 (86)	30 (86)	31 (88)	31 (88)	31 (88)	31 (88)
Mean daily minimum °C (°F)	21 (70)	21 (70)	22 (72)	24 (75)	24 (75)	24 (75)	23 (73)	23 (73)	23 (73)	23 (73)	23 (73)	22 (72)	23 (73)
Average precipitation mm (inches)	5.1 (0.20)	11.6 (0.46)	21.1 (0.83)	27.7 (1.09)	232.9 (9.17)	350.8 (13.81)	679.8 (26.76)	733.1 (28.86)	505 (19.9)	176.6 (6.95)	67.2 (2.65)	17.7 (0.70)	2,828.6 (111.38)
Average rainy days	3	3	3	4	14	18	23	25	22	15	8	4	142
Source: World Weather Online

== Demographics ==
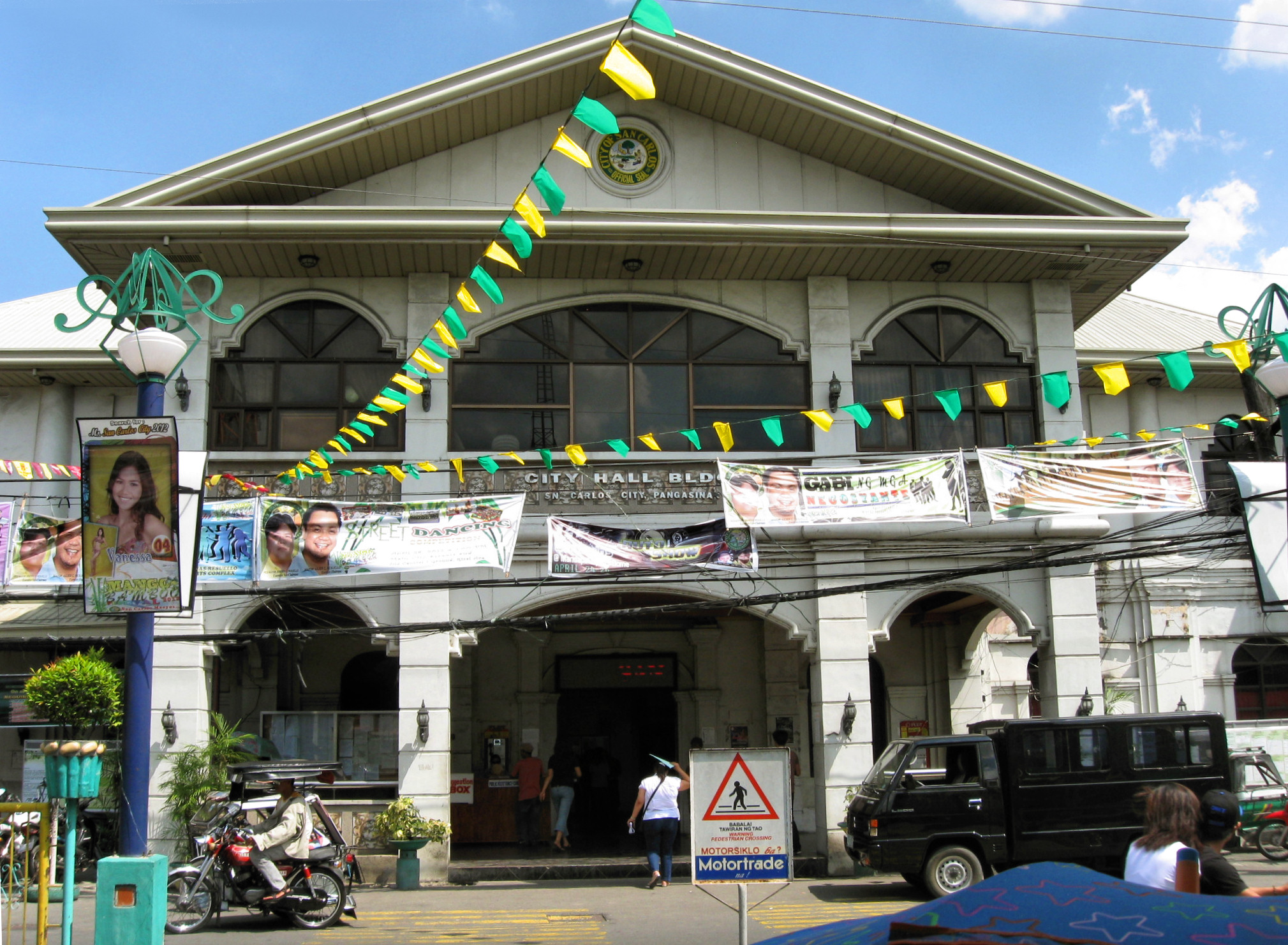
City Hall

Population census of San Carlos
Year	Pop.	±% p.a.
1903	27,166	—
1918	35,780	+1.85%
1939	47,334	+1.34%
1948	61,671	+2.98%
1960	73,900	+1.52%
1970	84,333	+1.33%
1975	90,882	+1.51%
1980	101,243	+2.18%
1990	124,529	+2.09%
1995	134,039	+1.39%
2000	154,264	+3.06%
2007	161,884	+0.67%
2010	175,103	+2.90%
2015	188,571	+1.42%
2020	205,424	+1.82%
2024	208,330	+0.34%
Source: Philippine Statistics Authority

=== Languages ===
Pangasinan is the main language of San Carlos.

== Economy ==
Poverty incidence of San Carlos (%)

Source: Philippine Statistics Authority

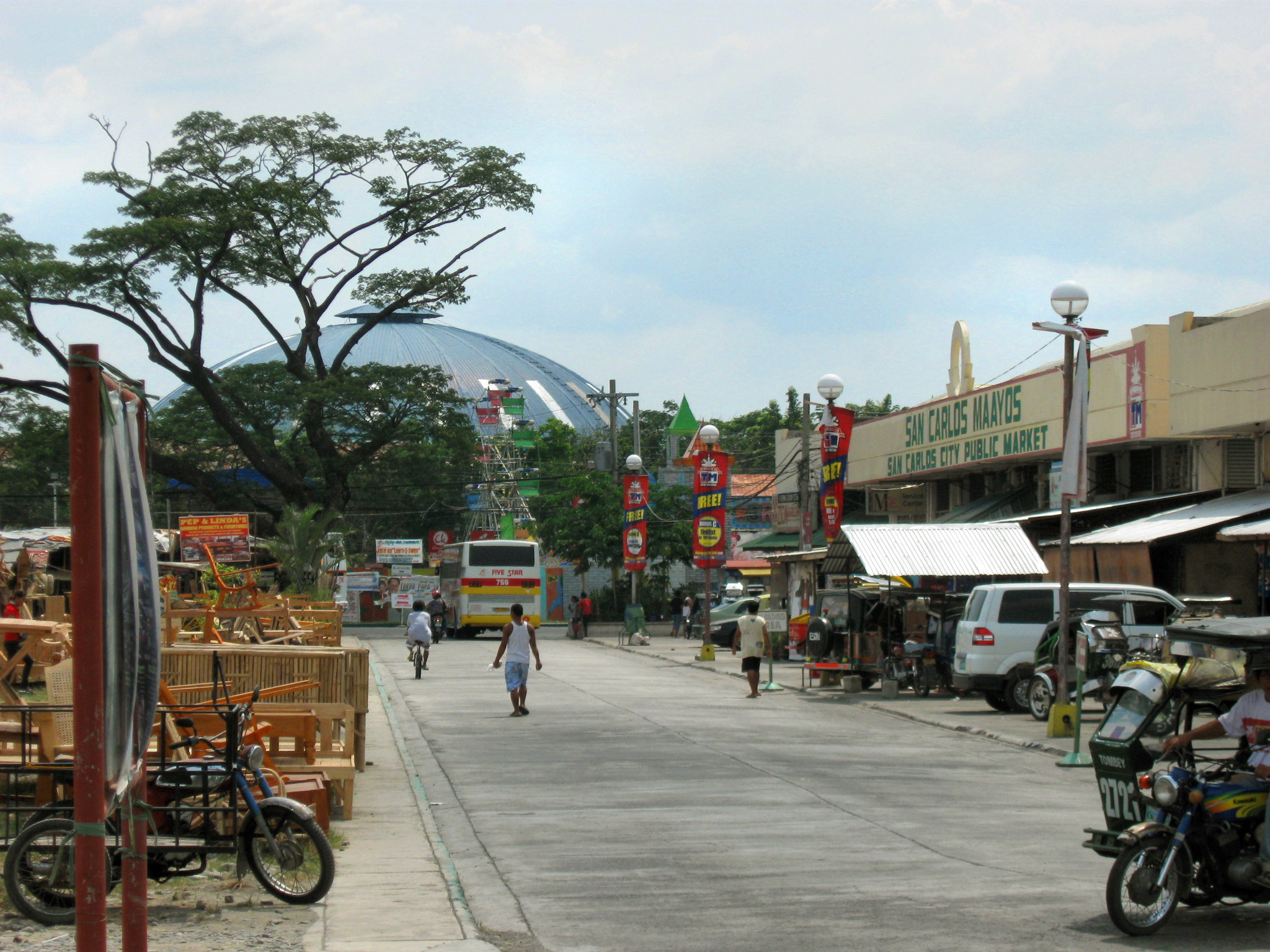
Public Market (foreground) and the Don Federico Mandapat Sports Dome (background) can be seen here

The city is also called the "Mango-Bamboo Capital of the Philippines", San Carlos has the largest number of mango trees and a thriving bamboocraft industry. San Carlos, an agroindustrial city, also engages in livestock raising, crop production, inland fishing, pottery, food processing, tourism, commerce and trade, small-scale manufacturing, and flour-making. San Carlos is said to have an ideal investment potential because of its large land area, big population and strategic location, being in the center of Pangasinan.

== Government ==
San Carlos City Hall

=== Local government ===
San Carlos, belonging to the third congressional district of the province of Pangasinan, is governed by a mayor designated as its local chief executive and by a municipal council as its legislative body in accordance with the Local Government Code. The mayor, vice mayor, and the councilors are elected directly by the people through an election which is being held every three years.

=== Elected officials ===
-
Position	Name
District Representative (3rd Legislative District the Province of Pangasinan)	Rose Marie J. Arenas
Chief Executive of the City of San Carlos	Mayor Julier C. Resuello
Presiding Officer of the City Council of San Carlos	Vice Mayor Joseres S. Resuello
Councilors of the City of San Carlos	Sam Baniqued
Councilors of the City of San Carlos	Jack Lester P. Soriano
Councilors of the City of San Carlos	Eduardo R. Garcia
Councilors of the City of San Carlos	Joshua G. Resuello
Councilors of the City of San Carlos	Christian Carlo A. Cancino
Councilors of the City of San Carlos	Winston Millora
Councilors of the City of San Carlos	Alberto S. Castro
Councilors of the City of San Carlos	Carmina D. Paningbatan
Councilors of the City of San Carlos	Jun Banaag
Councilors of the City of San Carlos	Karen Joyce Frias

== Tourism ==
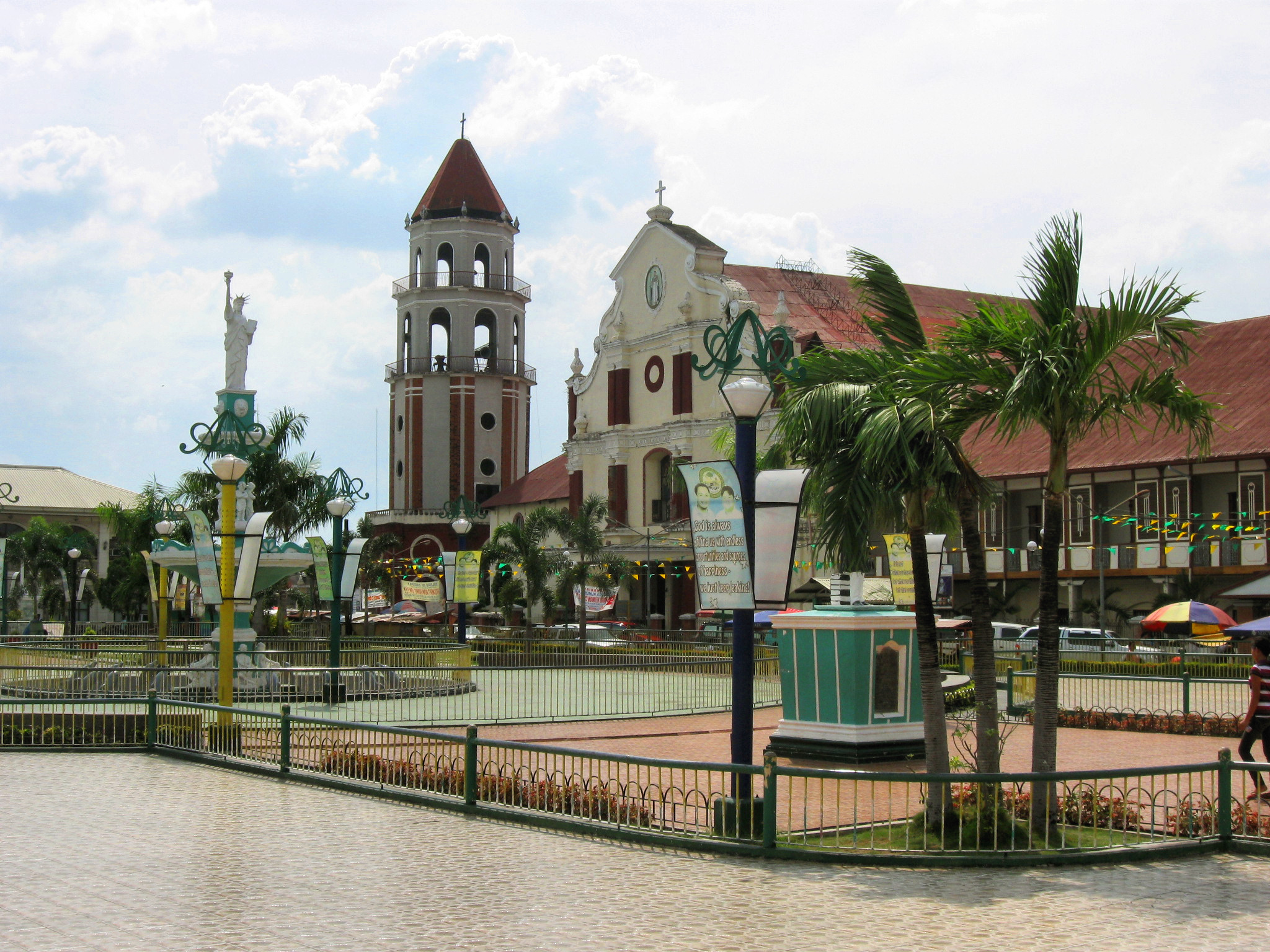
St. Dominic Church and city plaza

Interesting spots of the town include:

- 435-year-old Minor Basilica of Saint Dominic
- Speaker Eugenio Perez Memorial Park
- City Plaza
- Quadricentennial Arch in Bolingit
- Binalatongan Ruins in San Juan
- Philippine Fruit Corporation at Barangay Pagal

=== Giant mango pie ===
On April 26, 2011, 86 barangays in San Carlos baked a 100-square-meter mango pie — filling a gymnasium and setting the largest mango pie world record (400 sqm na mango pie, iniluto sa San Carlos City). Natives used 400 trays of mango pies (10 kilos each, P 400,000, in a 100-square-meter table and shared by more than 1,200). It highlighted San Carlos City's Mango-Bamboo Festival 2011.

== Transportation ==
Bus companies with service to and from Manila include Five Star Bus Company, Solid North Transit, Inc., Dagupan Bus Company, and First North Luzon Transit.

Jeepneys are available for commuters to its neighboring towns, like Calasiao and Malasiqui. Tricycles are available for commuters to barrios and barangays.

== Education ==
The San Carlos City Schools Division Office governs all educational institutions within the municipality. It oversees the management and operations of all private and public, from primary to secondary schools. There are four schools district offices under this division office, namely: District I, District II, District III, and District IV.

=== Primary and elementary schools ===
- Abanon Central School
- Ano Elementary School
- Antipangol Elementary School
- Aponit Elementary School
- Bacnar Elementary School
- Balaya Elementary School
- Balayong Elementary School
- Baldog Elementary School
- Balite Sur Elementary School
- Bani Elementary School
- Bolingit Elementary School
- Bogaoan Elementary School
- Bolosan-Caingal Elementary School
- Butterfly Kingdom e-Learning School
- C. P. Gutierrez Elementary School
- Calobaoan Elementary School
- Calomboyan Elementary School
- Candido Marcellano Integrated School
- Caoayan-Kiling Elementary School
- Central I Elementary School
- Central II Elementary School
- Clark Educational Center
- Coliling Elementary School
- Don Pablo C. Tulagan Elementary School
- Don Vicente G. Ferrer Elementary School
- Doyong Elementary School
- Ednas School of San Carlos
- Gamata Elementary School
- Gospel of Christ School of San Carlos
- Holy Child Play Center
- Isla Elementary School
- Ignacio Centeno Elementary School
- Jose Macam Paningbatan Sr. Elementary Schoo
- Julian Valerio Resuello Elementary School
- Libas Elementary School
- Lilimasan Elementary School
- Mabalbalino Elementary School
- Magtaking Elementary School
- Malacañang Elementary School
- Mestizo Norte Elementary School
- Mother Goose Special School System
- Naguilayan Elementary School
- Nelintap Elementary School
- Our Lady of Grace School of San Carlos City
- Pagal Elementary School
- Palaming Elementary School
- Palospos Elementary School
- Pangalangan Elementary School
- Pangoloan Elementary School
- Pangpang Elementary School
- Parayao Elementary School
- Payapa Elementary School
- Payar Elementary School
- Polo Elementary School
- Quintong Elementary School
- Rainbow School of San Carlos
- San Carlos Preparatory School
- Saint Albert The Great Science Academy
- Salinap Elementary School
- St. Charles Academy
- Supo Elementary School
- Tandoc Elementary School
- Talang Central School
- Tamayo Elementary School
- Tarectec Elementary School
- Turac Elementary School
- VM Child Learning Center

=== Secondary schools ===
- Abanon National High School
- Agdao Integrated School
- Bacnar National High School
- Bolingit National High School
- Cobol National High School
- Coliling National High School
- Doyong National High School
- Guelew Integrated School
- Libas National High School
- Lilimasan National High School
- Mabalbalino National High School
- Malacañang National High School
- Pangalangan National High School
- Salinap National High School
- Speaker Eugenio Perez National Agricultural School
- Tamayo National High School
- Tandoc National High School
- Tarece Integrated School
- Tebag Elementary School
- Turac National High School
- Virgen Milagrosa Special Science High School
- VMUF- San Luis High School
- VMUF - St. Dominic High School
- VMUF - Senior High School

=== Technical and vocational schools ===
- Metro San Carlos Institute of Technology

=== Higher educational institutions ===
- Colegio Anunciata
- Palaris Colleges
- Pangasinan State University - San Carlos Campus
- PIMSAT Colleges
- San Carlos College
- St. Therese College Foundation
- Virgen Milagrosa University Foundation

== Gallery ==
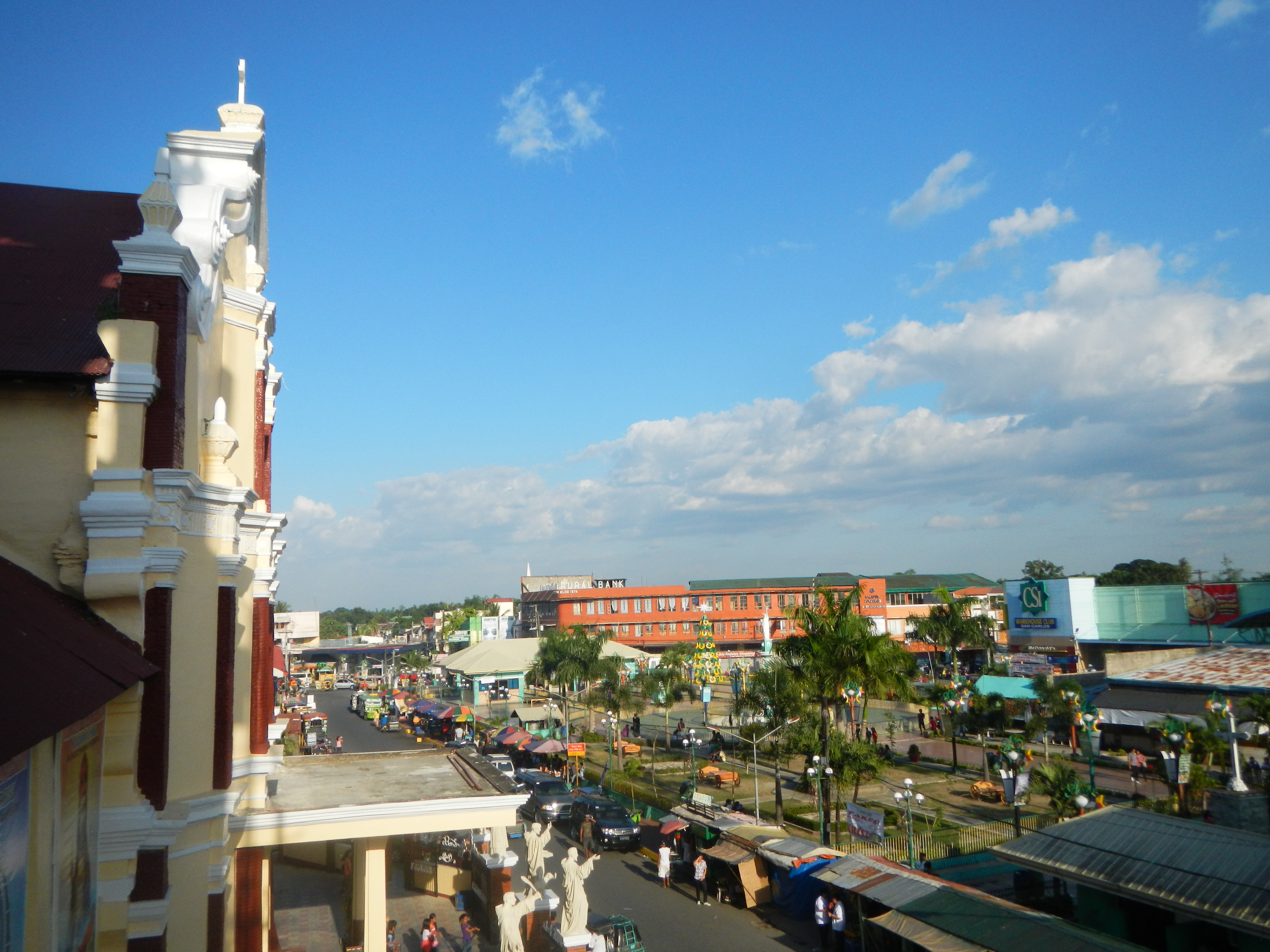
View of the city from the Bell Tower

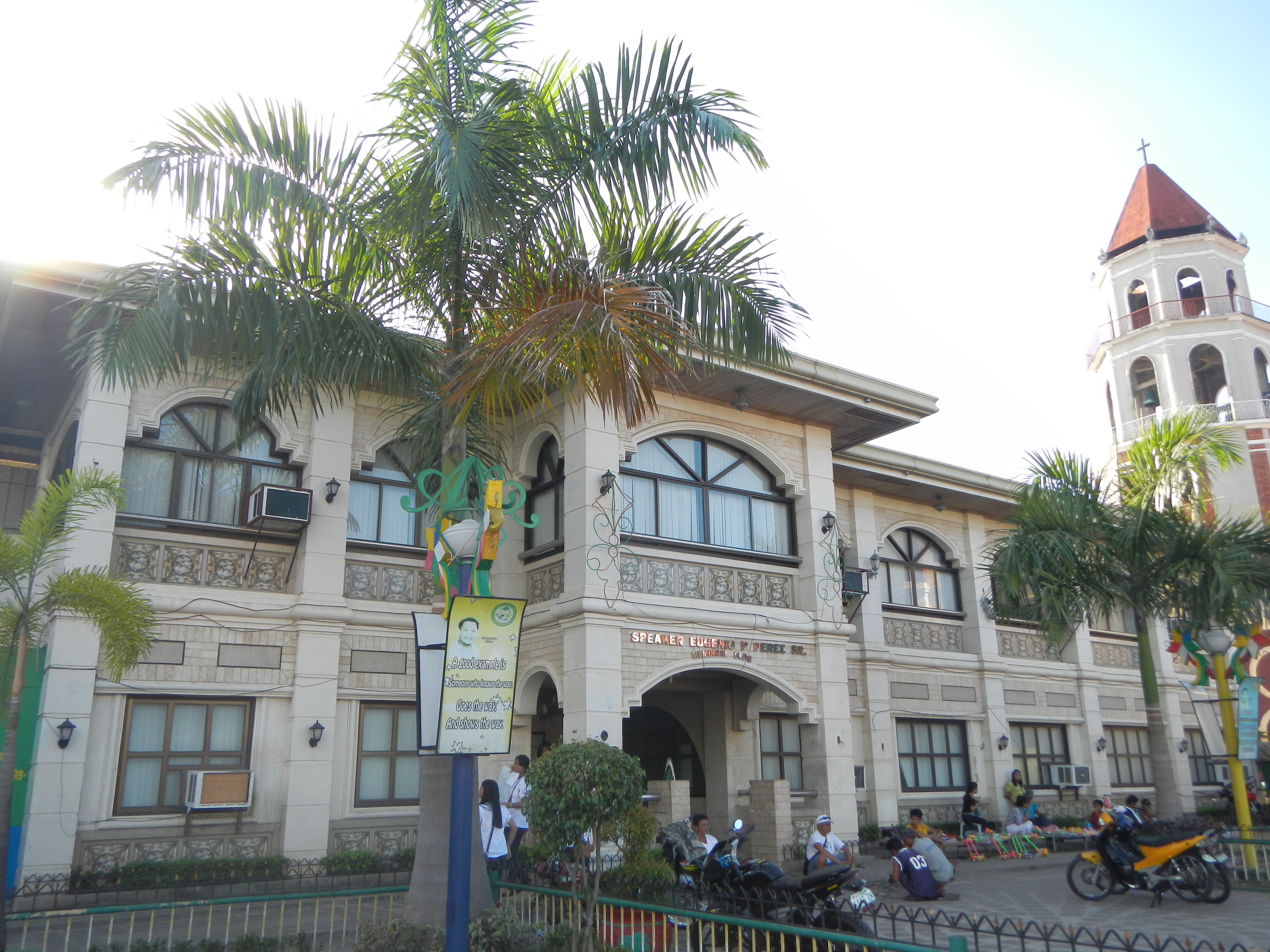
Eugenio Pérez Memorial Building, Museum

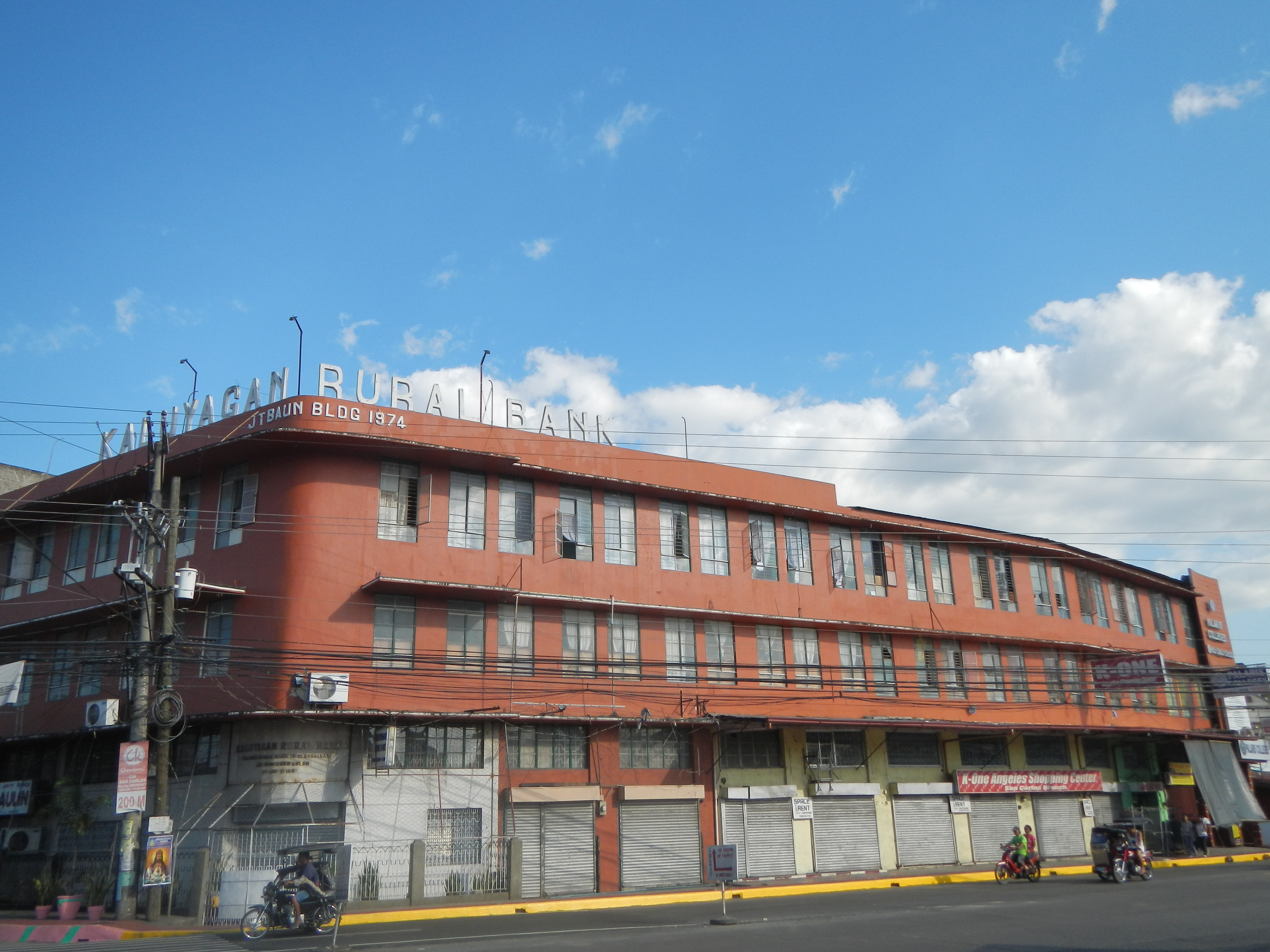
Kaluyagan Rural Bank and Palaris Colleges School (JT Baun Building)

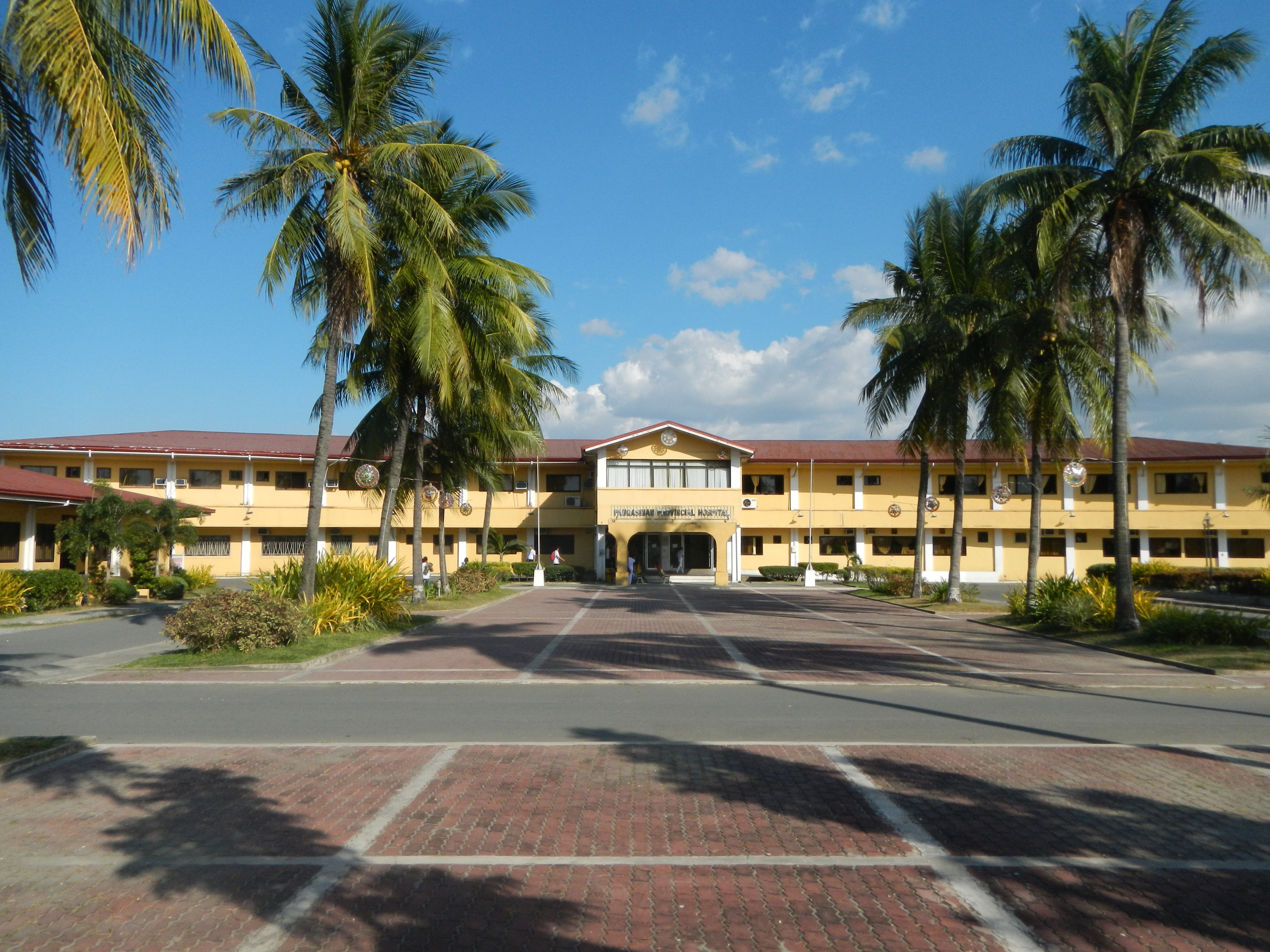
Pangasinan Provincial Hospital

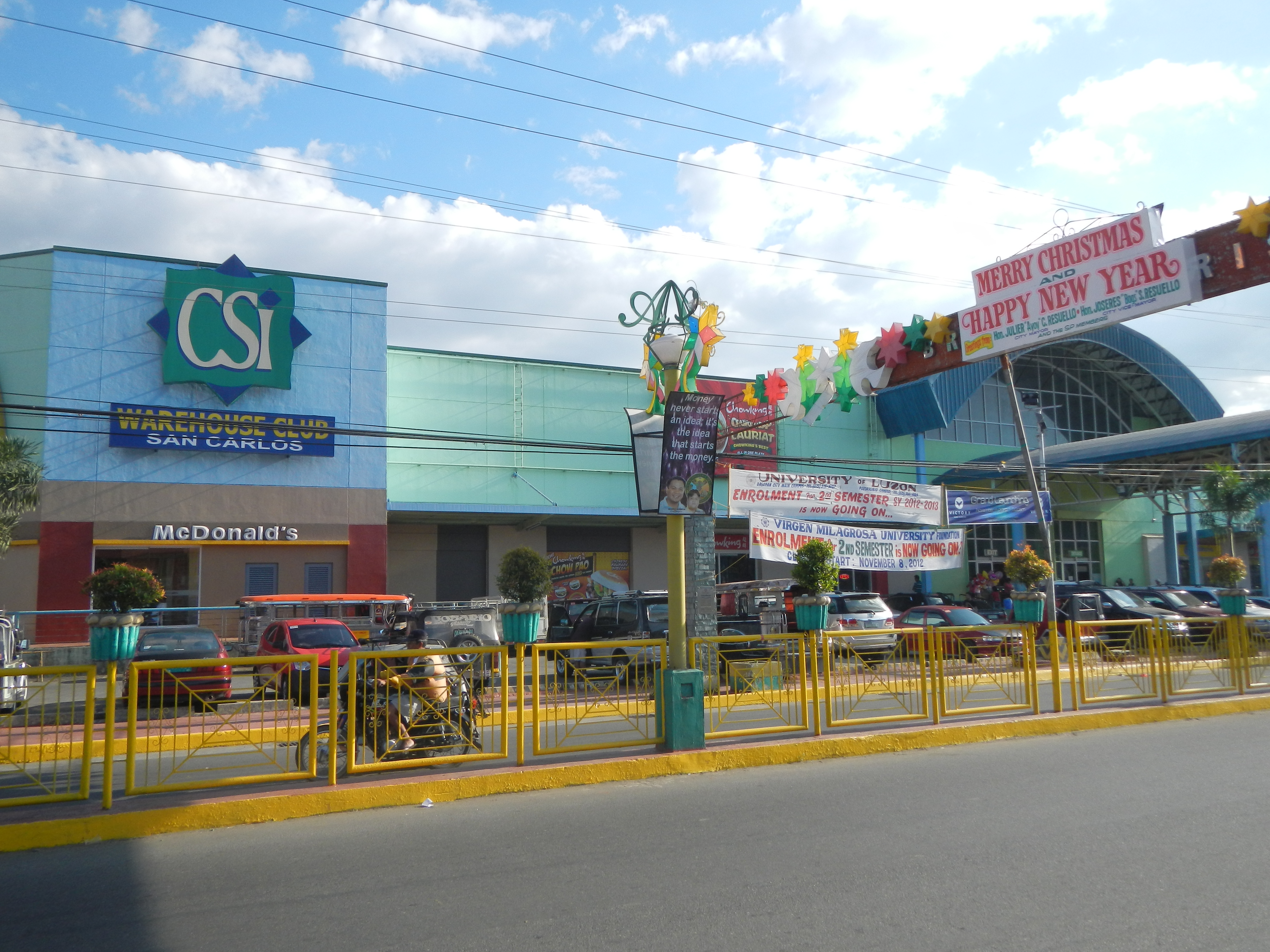
City Supermarket, Inc.

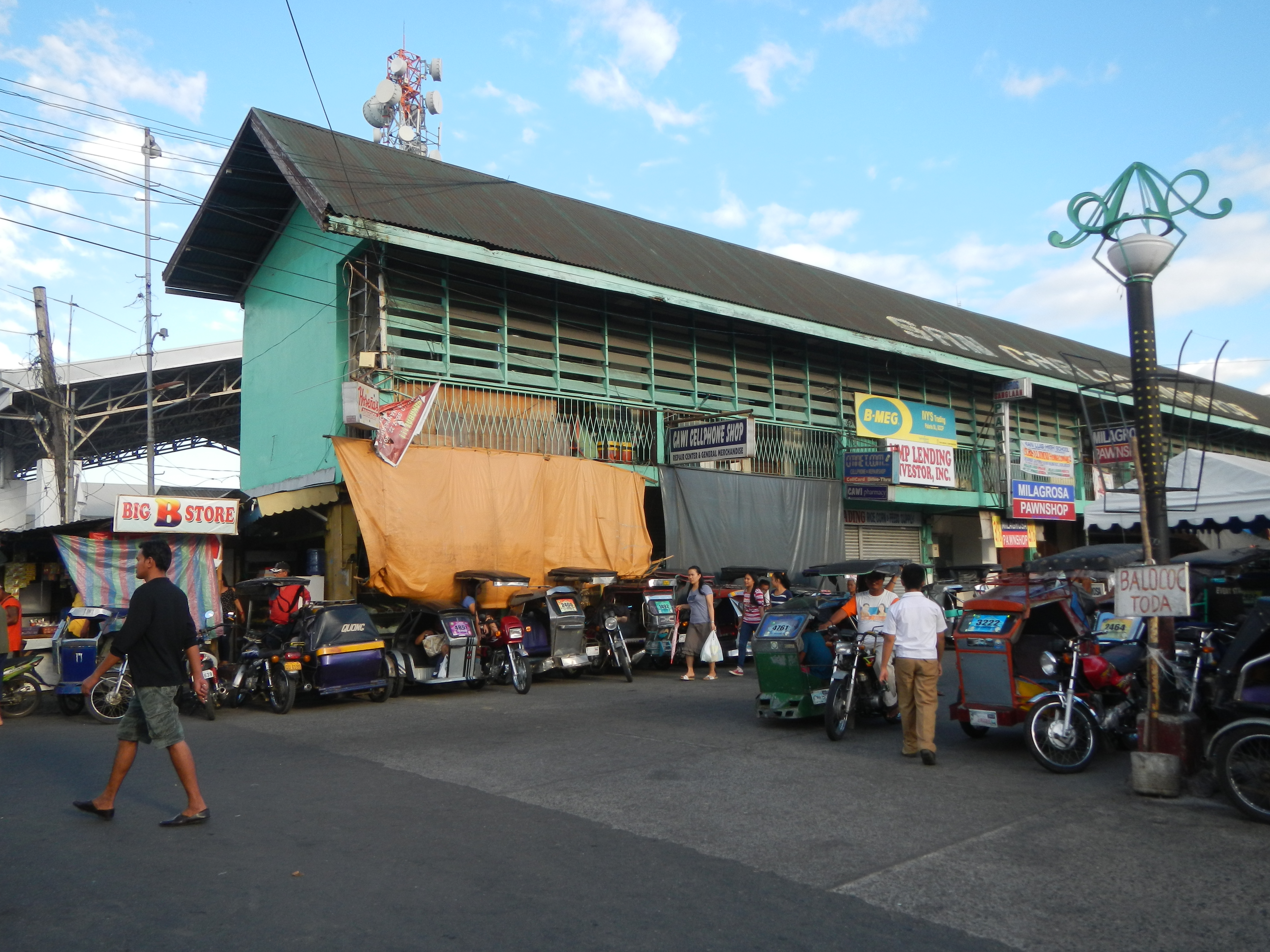
Old public market in 2015 (razed by 2024 fire
