= Genesis Transport =

Bus company in the Philippines

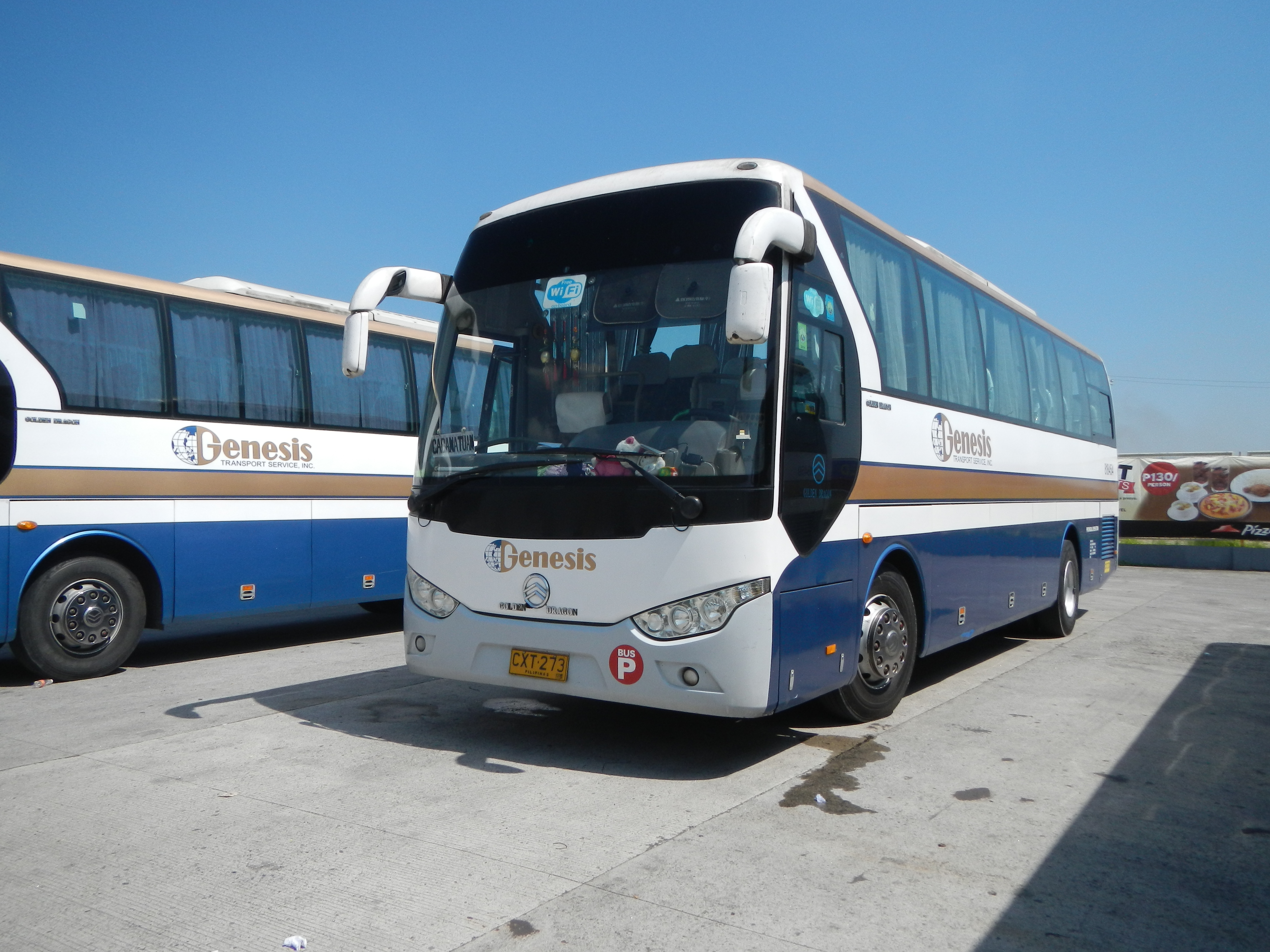
- A Genesis Transport bus at Robinsons Starmills Pampanga
- Founded: December 7, 1991; 34 years ago
- Headquarters: 704 EDSA Corner New York St., Cubao, Quezon City
- Locale: Luzon
- Service area: Metro Manila; Central Luzon; Baguio
- Service type: Provincial Operation
- Hubs: Cubao; Pasay
- Fleet: 200+
- Operator: Genesis Transport Service, Inc.
- Chief executive: Riza Angara Moises
- Website: www.genesistransportserviceinc.com

Genesis Transport Service, Inc. (GTSI), also known as Genesis Transport Services, Inc., Genesis Transport Corporation and Genesis Group of Companies, is a provincial bus company in the Philippines, operating routes connecting Metro Manila to Central Luzon and Northern Luzon.

== Etymology and logo ==
The name of the bus company Genesis is a biblical word meaning "the beginning". Half of the letter "G" in its logo shows the Philippine map, representing the center of the company's operations.

== History ==
Genesis started its operations in December 7, 1991, with a shuttle bus between Paskuhan Village in San Fernando, Pampanga and the malls in Metro Manila. From there, it grew to owning three buses, which it operated with a crew of six people, and two partners. In 2007, Genesis Transport had a total of 300 buses, servicing routes to key destinations in Central Luzon; including Tarlac, Bataan, Cabanatuan, Aurora, and Baguio.

In 2009, the company was one of the sponsors of the 5th Philippine Bird Festival in Bataan.

On September 13, 2025, Genesis launched their interprovincial premium P2P service between Clark International Airport and Balanga, Bataan. On February 12, 2026, Genesis launched their hybrid electric vehicles plies their route between PITX and Balanga. On March 17, Genesis also launched their route between PITX and Clark International Airport via Ninoy Aquino International Airport Terminal 3.

== Subsidiaries ==
=== Manila Genesis Charters & Tours ===
In 2006, Genesis Transport established a new subsidiary, Manila Genesis Charters & Tours, Inc., as a Philippine corporation duly registered with the Securities and Exchange Commission. The company offers chartered tourist and shuttle services within the Clark Special Economic Zone in Pampanga.

=== JoyBus ===
In August 2010, Genesis Transport launched JoyBus, a premium service featuring Wi-Fi-equipped 41-seater Deluxe coaches and 28-seater Executive and Premier coaches with onboard toilets. The service initially provided non-stop trips to Baler, Aurora. By April 2012, JoyBus expanded its routes to include Cubao–Baguio, Avenida–Baguio, NAIA–Baguio, Pasay–Baguio, and Balanga–Baguio.

=== North Genesis ===
In 2010, Genesis Transport Service, Inc. announced a partnership with Dagupan Bus Co., Inc. and Saulog Transit Inc.. However, in early 2015, Genesis Transport acquired the former's Baguio–Cubao route and rebranded it as North Genesis.

=== Saulog Transit ===
Another subsidiary which serves routes connecting Cavite City, Cubao, Pasay and PITX to Olongapo City, Zambales, as well as routes from Parañaque Integrated Terminal Exchange (PITX) to Cavite City, Naic, and Ternate, Cavite.

=== Other ===
They also took over operations of Aurora Bus Lines, which serves the province of Aurora. Its terminal is located in Cabanatuan.

== Fleet ==
=== Current ===
Autodelta Coach Builders

- Autodelta 12-meters coach body
  - Volvo B7R
  - Volvo B8R

Del Monte Motor Works

- Del Monte Motor Works DM16 S2 HID bus body
  - Volvo B8R

Xiamen Golden Dragon Bus Co., Ltd.

- Golden Dragon XML6103
- Golden Dragon XML6122J18
- Golden Dragon XML6122J38Y
- Golden Dragon XML6127
- Golden Dragon XML6129J15

Guilin Daewoo Bus Co., Ltd.

- Guilin Daewoo GDW6121H

Santarosa Motor Works

- Santarosa Motor Works Cityliner bus body
  - Daewoo BV115
- Santarosa Motor Works Jetliner bus body
  - Daewoo BV115

Marcopolo S.A.

- Marcopolo G7 Paradiso 1200 bus body
  - Scania K360IB

Zhengzhou Yutong Group Co., Ltd.

- Yutong ZK6107HA
- Yutong ZK6117H
- Yutong ZK6119HA
- Yutong ZK6119H2
- Yutong ZK6122HD9
- Yutong ZK6128H

Zhongtong Bus

- Zhongtong LCK6119H

=== Former ===
- Pilipinas Hino RK (1995–2014)
- Mercedes-Benz OH1625L (1997–2013)
- SR Nissan Diesel NDPC Euro (1996–2013)
- SR Exfoh Hi-Deck MAN 18.310 (2003–2016)
- SR Nissan Diesel Exfoh JA450SSN (2005–2019)
- SR Nissan Diesel Exfoh SP215NSB (2005–2016)
- Santarosa SR NV620 (2008–2019)
- AMC Tourist Star AC RE MAN 18.280 (2007–2016)
- Kia Granbird (First Generation)
- Hino RM2PSS Grandecho 1
- Yutong ZK6100H

== Fare Classes ==
- Regular Airconditioned (2x2 seating configuration.)
- Deluxe (2x2 seating with onboard lavatory.)
- Executive* (2x1 lazyboy seating with charging ports each seat, blanket each seat, free snacks with bottled mineral water and onboard lavatory.)
- Premier* (2x1 lazyboy seating with charging ports each seat, individual buspad, blanket each seat, free snacks with bottled mineral water and onboard lavatory.)

Note: All classes offers WiFi

*Uses JoyBus

== Fleet Numbering ==
Fleet numbers consist of five or six digits, with the first three digits typically starting with '818' for all buses, except for certain P2P units.

== Destinations ==
=== Metro Manila ===
- Avenida, Manila
- Cubao, Quezon City
- Pasay
- Parañaque Integrated Terminal Exchange (for Balanga trips only)

=== Provincial ===
- Baguio (uses North Genesis via SCTEX-Luisita Exit and JoyBus via TPLEX Rosario Exit)
- Tarlac City, Tarlac
- Gerona, Tarlac
- Clark International Airport, Pampanga (also P2P Bus Services Routes)
- Mabalacat, Pampanga (Dau Bus Terminal)
- San Fernando, Pampanga
- Balanga, Bataan
- Mariveles, Bataan (FAB Central Terminal)
- Baler, Aurora
- Cabanatuan, Nueva Ecija

=== Inter-provincial ===
- San Fernando (Pampanga) - Cabanatuan via Gapan
- Baguio - Mariveles via Dau - San Fernando (Pampanga) & via SCTEX Luisita Exit
- Baguio - Balanga via TPLEX, Dau and San Fernando (Pampanga) (uses Joybus)
- Baguio - Clark Airport via TPLEX and Dau (uses Joybus)
- Baguio - Baler via San Jose (Nueva Ecija)
- Clark Airport - Balanga via San Fernando (Pampanga) (uses P2P service)
- Cabanatuan - Baler via San Luis or Maria Aurora (placards and LEDs displayed as Maria)
- San Jose (Nueva Ecija) - Mariveles via SM City Cabanatuan

== See also ==
- List of bus companies of the Philippines
