= JAM Liner =

Bus company in the Philippines

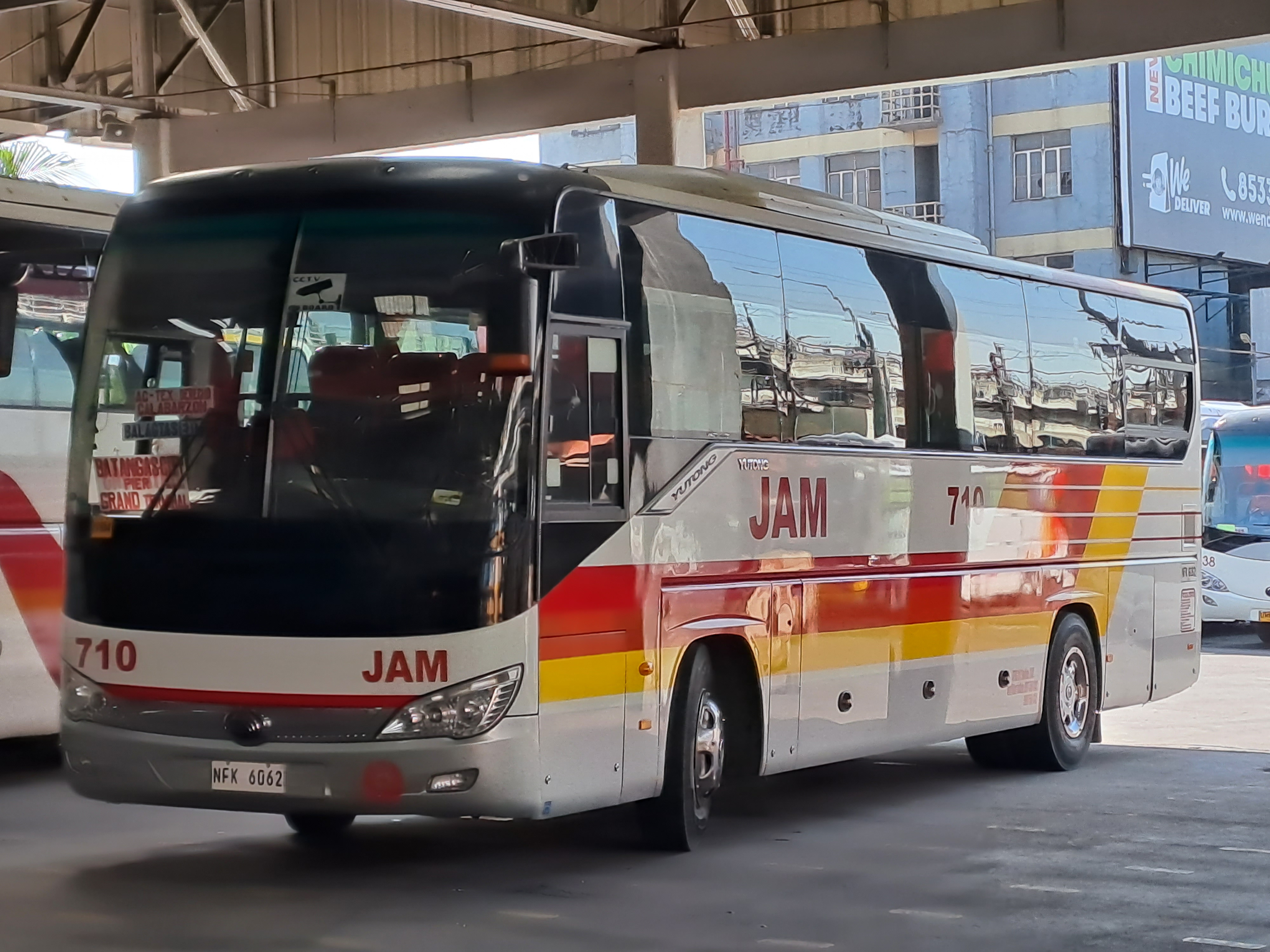
- A JAM Liner bus at JAC Liner's Kamias Terminal.
- Parent: JAC Liner
- Founded: April 17, 1968; 58 years ago
- Headquarters: Tagaytay Road, Pulong Santa Cruz, Santa Rosa, Laguna
- Locale: Southern Luzon
- Service area: Metro Manila; Laguna; Batangas; Quezon
- Service type: Provincial Operation
- Hubs: Cubao; Buendia

JAM Liner Inc. is a bus company that serves direct routes from Manila to provinces of Laguna, Batangas and Quezon. It is among the predominant bus companies in Luzon together with its parent JAC Liner and its subsidiaries. Dennise Trajano once served as JAM Liner's President and CEO as well as Philtranco Services Enterprises, Incorporated before the company was acquired by the JAC Group.

== Etymology ==
The name JAM Liner came from the first letter of its founders', Josefina Mercado and her husband, Artemio Mercado, first name and surname. Thus "J"osefina and "A"rtemio "M"ercado.

== History ==
JAM Liner logo before sold to JAC liner

JAM Liner was established on April 7, 1968, by Artemio and Josefina Mercado with an initial fleet of just four buses. The company began by operating the Biñan, Laguna to Manila route. Over time, the Mercados significantly expanded their operations within Laguna, eventually controlling approximately 30 percent of the province's transportation services.

By 1990, they had expanded their operations to include routes serving the provinces of Quezon, Batangas, Camarines Sur, Albay and Sorsogon. The company's fleet grew substantially during this period, reaching approximately 290 franchised bus units.

In 2000, management of JAM Liner was taken over by Penta Pacific Realty Corporation, led by Jose “Pepito” Ch. Alvarez. Under Alvarez's leadership, JAM Liner's operations were integrated with those of Philtranco Services Enterprises, Inc., another major bus company acquired by Penta Pacific in 1999.

Despite the integration of JAM Liner and Philtranco under Penta Pacific Realty Corporation, both companies continued to operate independently, each maintaining its own corporate structure, management, and subsidiaries. JAM Liner operates under the JAM Group of Companies, which includes subsidiaries such as JAM Liner, JAM Transit, Phil Tourister, and First Charters and Tours Transport Corporation. Meanwhile, Philtranco Services Enterprises, Inc. oversees its own subsidiaries: Philtranco, Phikargo, and Amihan Bus Lines. The group was later led by President and CEO Dennise Trajano.

JAM Liner, together with Philtranco, introduced innovative improvements to their ticketing services through strategic partnerships with VMoney and Smart’s Pinoy Travel platform.

In 2013, the iconic Filipino rock band The Dawn composed and performed JAM Liner’s official company theme song, titled “JAM Tayo” (Tagalog for “Let’s Jam”).

In 2015, JAM Liner entered into a joint venture with SM Investments Corporation to expand its operations to Cebu. This collaboration led to the formation of Metro Rapid Transit Service Inc., more commonly known as Cebu MyBus. The service operates as a bus rapid transit system, providing transportation within SM Seaside City, SM City Cebu, Mactan–Cebu International Airport, and key urban centers across Metro Cebu. This venture marked JAM Liner's first expansion into the Visayas region and represented one of its most ambitious initiatives in an area long dominated by the country's largest transport operator, the Yanson Group of Bus Companies.

In 2016, JAM Liner, in partnership with QRS Logistics and the University of the Philippines, formed a basketball team for the PBA Developmental League under the name UP-QRS-JAM. The roster was primarily composed of players from the UP Fighting Maroons, who also competed in the UAAP Basketball Tournament.

That same year, JAM Liner, together with its partners Philtranco and FastCat, launched a transportation modernization program aimed at improving inter-island connectivity across Luzon, Visayas, and Mindanao. As part of this initiative, the group envisioned building a nationwide fleet of 1,000 buses, with FastCat providing maritime support to link key destinations across the archipelago.

In 2021, the Jaime A. Chua Group of Companies (JAC Liner Inc.) acquired JAM Liner Inc. and JAM Transit to expand their route network, saving the company from being dragged into near-bankruptcy with its former sister company Philtranco and Amihan Bus which was then-ruled by Jose Jessie Olivar. The company since then acquired brand-new and state-of-the-art Yutong, King Long, and Higer bus units under the new management.

== Fleet ==
JAM Liner utilizes buses that are made from a local coach builder, Santarosa Motor Works Philippines. Under the management of JAC Liner Inc., the company acquired new Yutong, King Long and Higer buses.

=== Current ===
Santarosa Motor Works Inc.

- Santarosa Cityliner bus body
  - Daewoo BV115 (first generation)
  - Daewoo BF106
  - Daewoo BS106
  - Daewoo BS120S
- Santarosa Exfoh bus body
  - Nissan Diesel PKB212N
  - Nissan Diesel JA450SSN (facelifted into Daewoo BV115 Cityliner by Penta Motors)

Zhengzhou Yutong Group Co., Ltd.

- Yutong ZK6107H
- Yutong ZK6107HA
- Yutong ZK6119HA

Higer Bus Company Limited

- Higer KLQ6116Y "V11"

King Long United Automotive Industry Co., Ltd.

- King Long XMQ6112Y
- King Long XMQ6112AY
- King Long XMQ6127AYW01 "Longwei II"

== Gallery ==
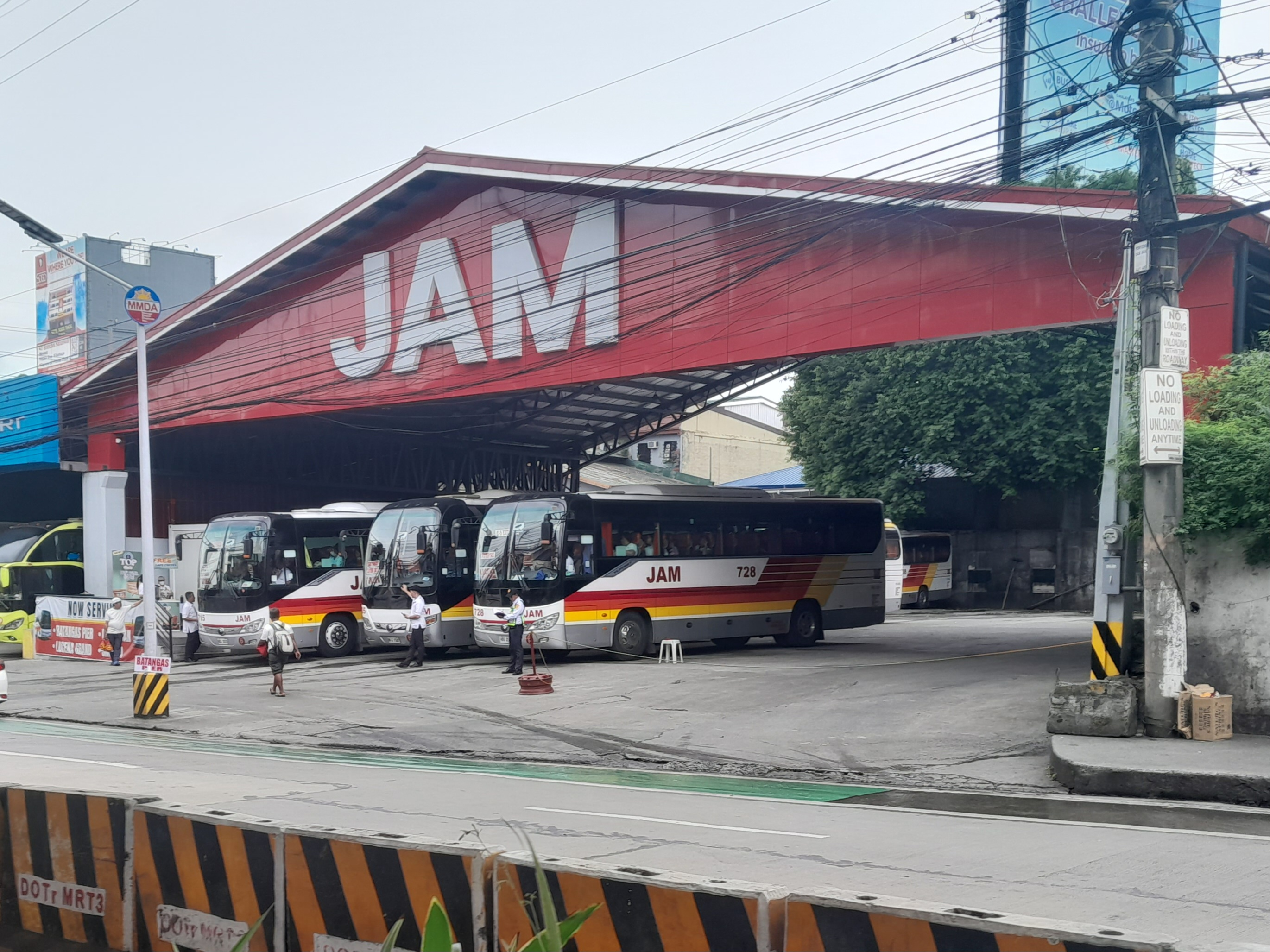
JAM Liner Kamias Station

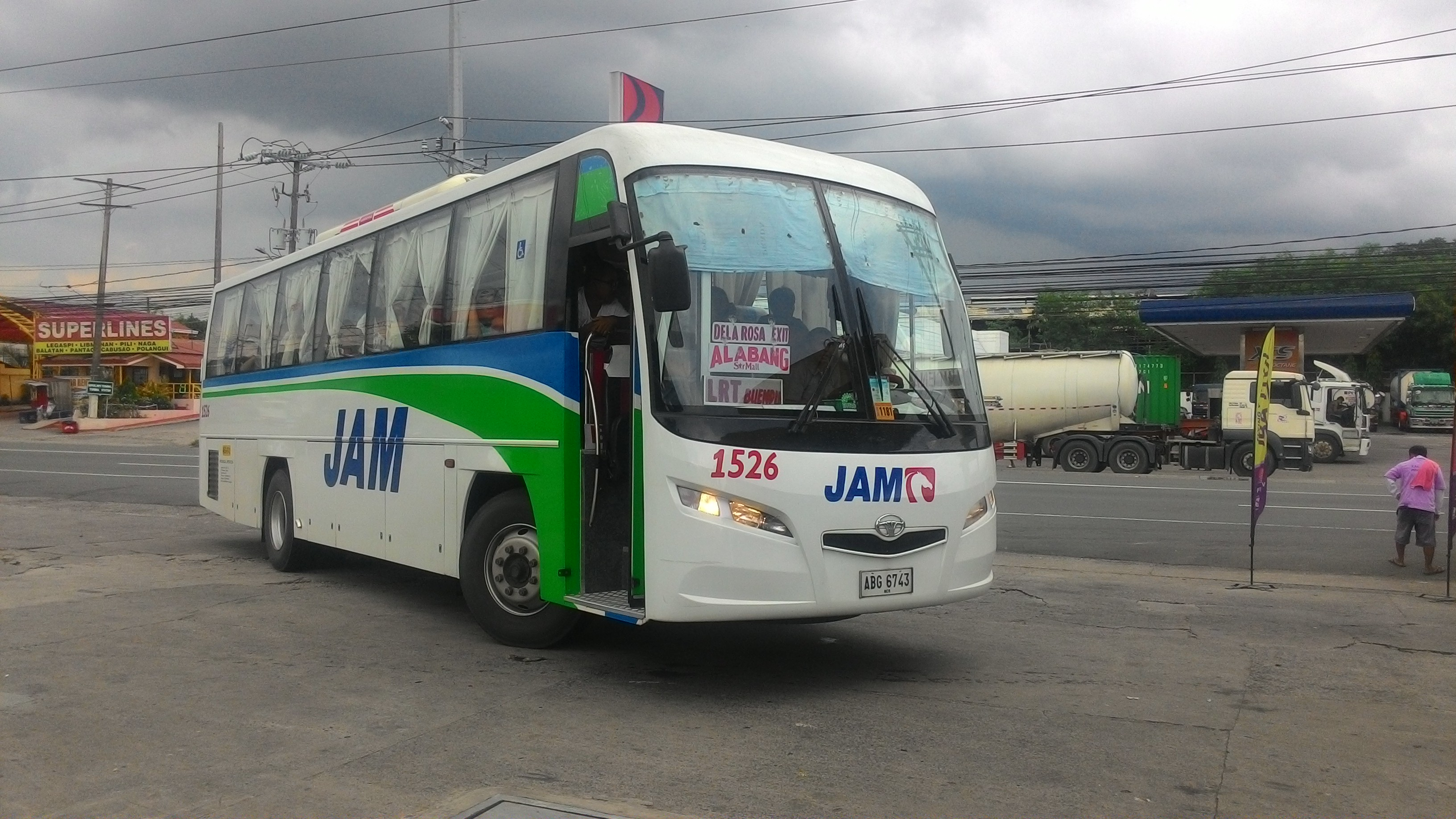
JAM Liner "1526" Daewoo BS106 which was formerly used by Cebu MyBus.

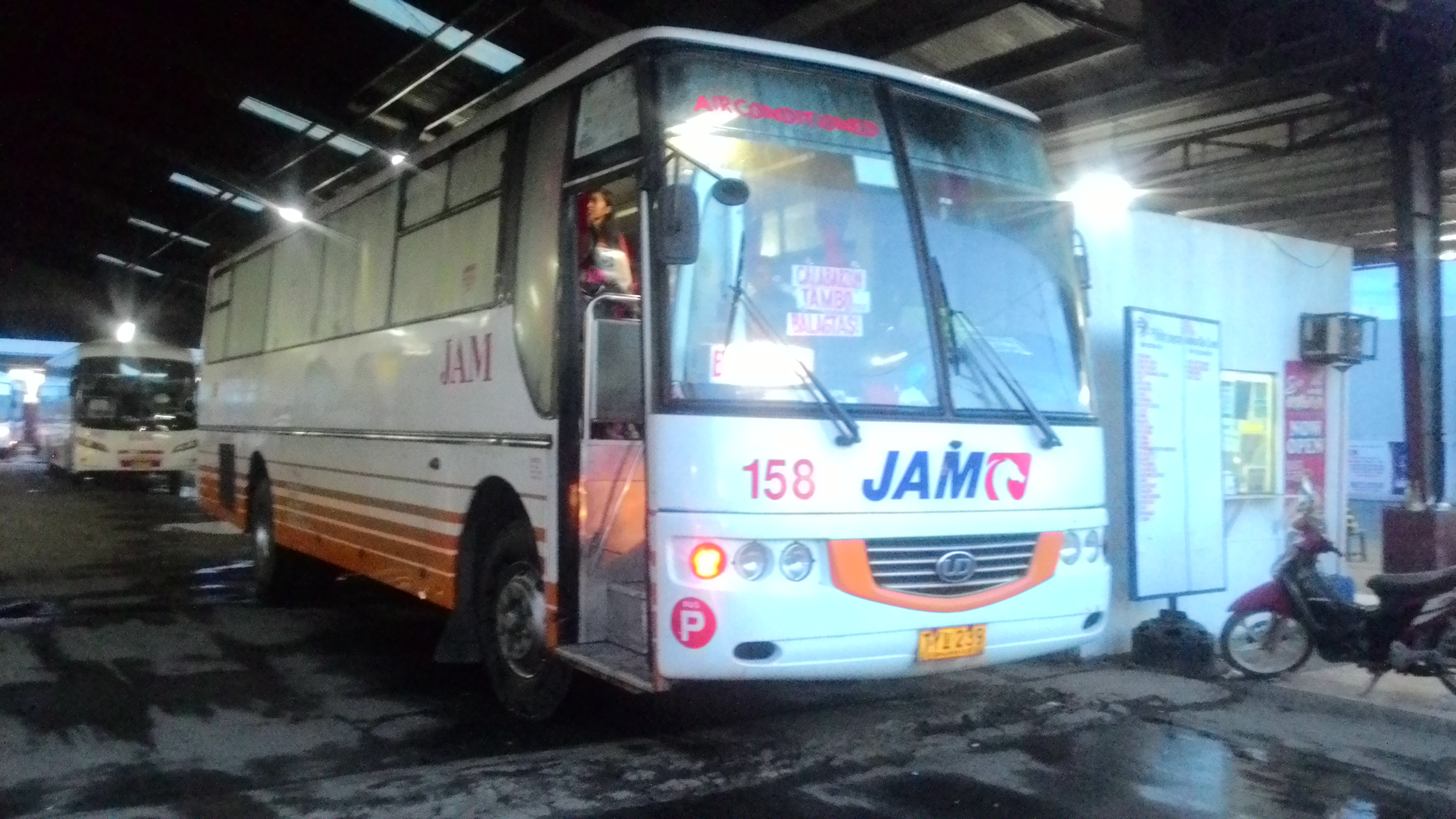
First Charter's now-retired Nissan Diesel Exfoh bus unit.

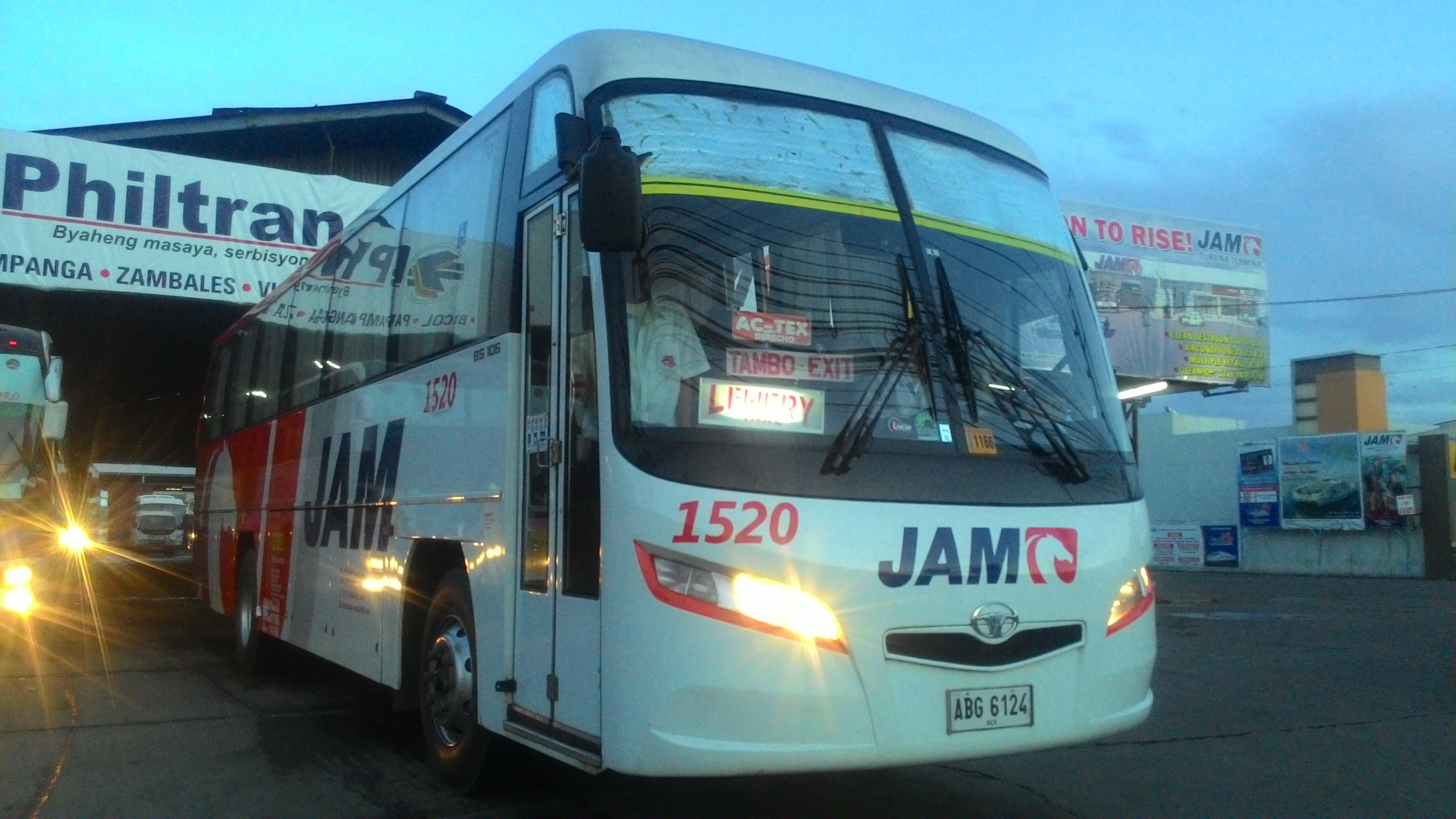
JAM Liner "1520" Daewoo BS106 heading to Lemery, Batangas.

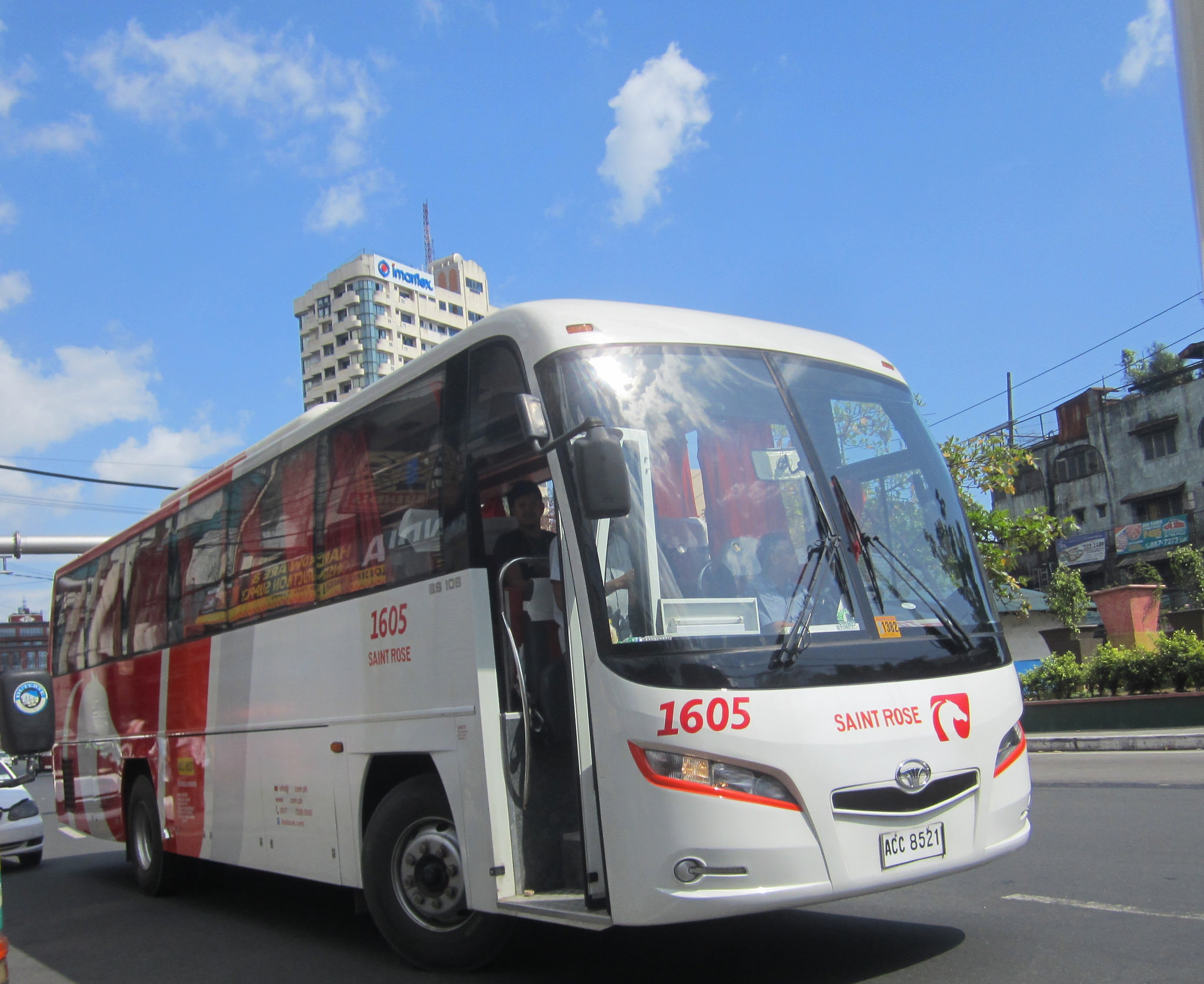
Saint Rose Transit "1605" Daewoo BS106. Now absorbed to JAM.

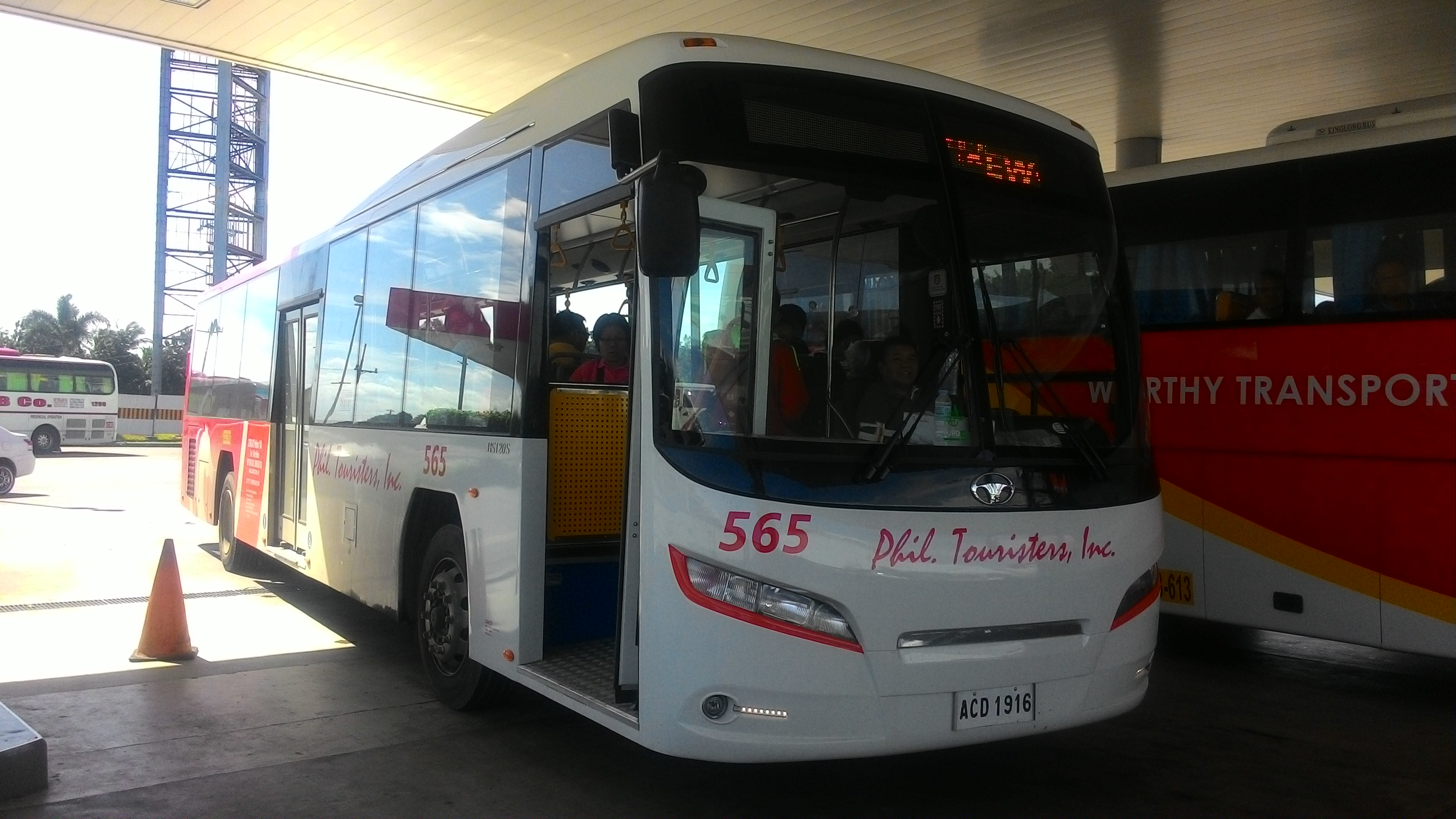
Phil Touristers Inc. "565" Daewoo BS120S.

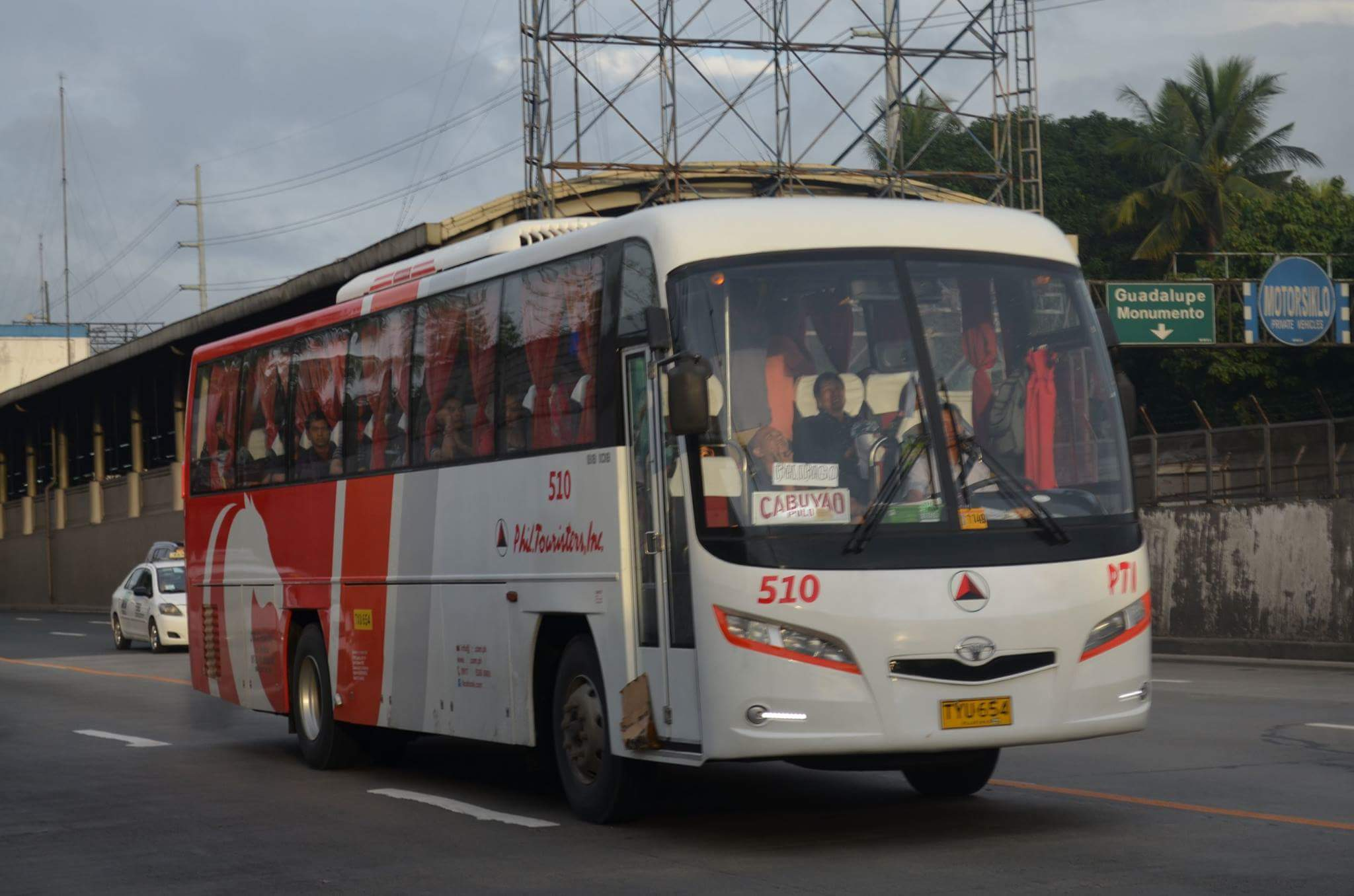
Phil Touristers Inc. "510" Daewoo BS106 heading to Cabuyao, Laguna.

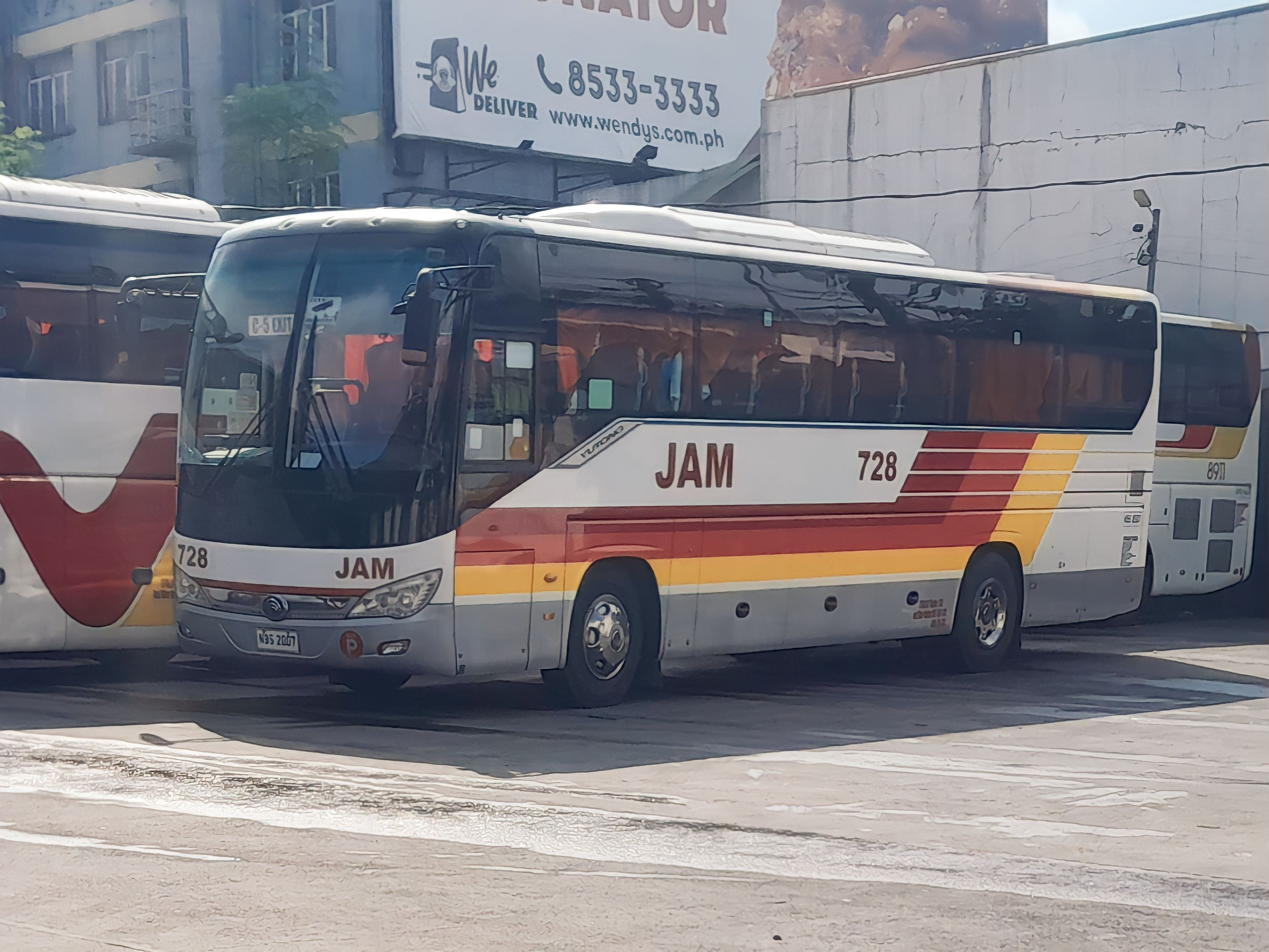
JAM Liner "728" Yutong ZK6119H2 wearing the classic red-orange-yellow livery after JAC Group's takeover.

== Terminals ==
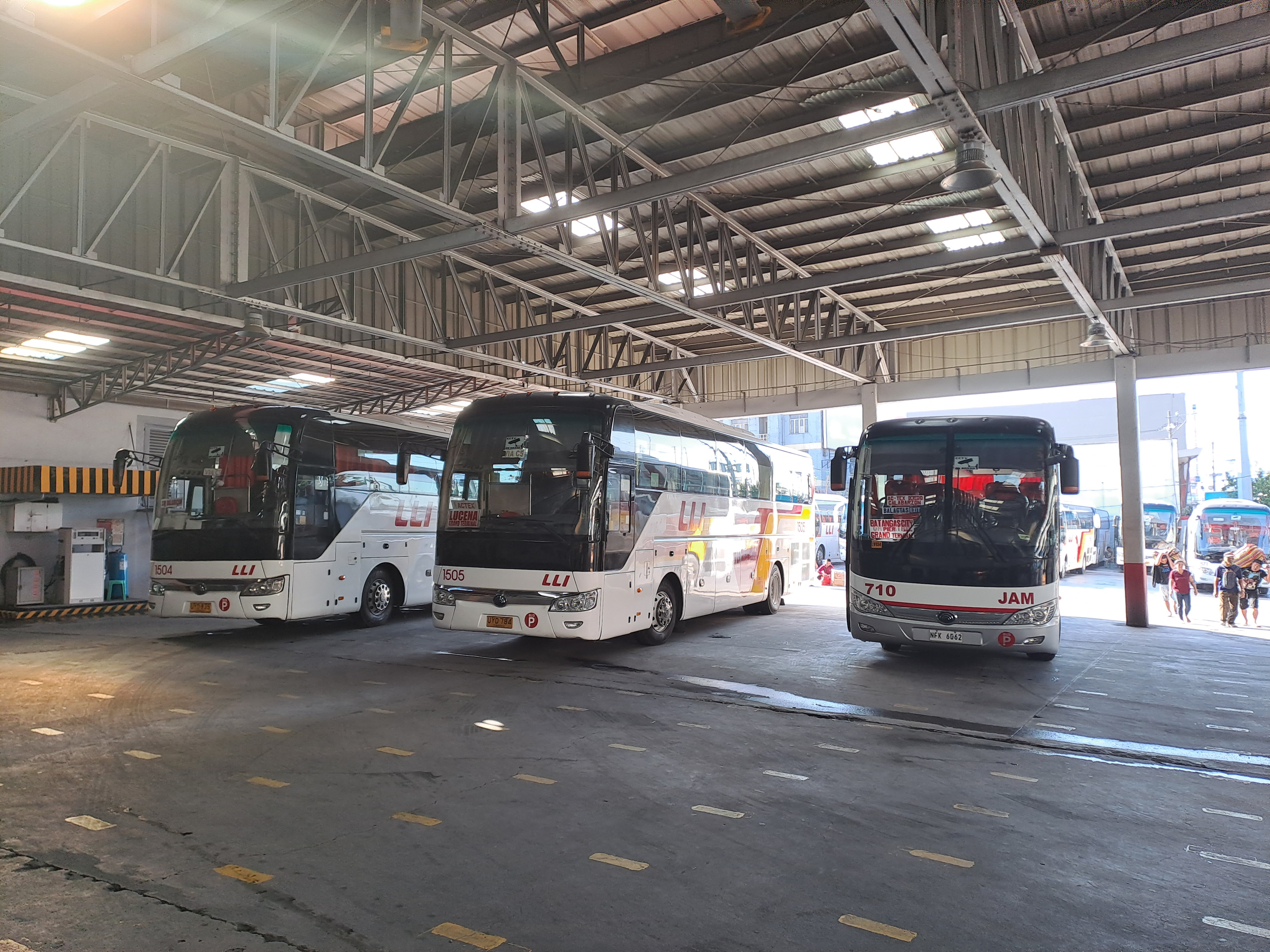
A JAM Liner bus together with Lucena Lines (LLI) buses at JAC Liner Kamias Terminal

- JAM Liner Kamias Station, EDSA, Quezon City
- Pangasinan Solid North Transit Avenida Station, Doroteo Jose St., Santa Cruz, Manila
- JAC Liner Buendia Station, Taft Avenue, Pasay
- P. Burgos St., Poblacion, Biñan, Laguna
- Francisco A. Canicosa Ave., Balibago, Santa Rosa, Laguna
- National Highway cor. Arabella Homes Rd., Pulo, Cabuyao, Laguna
- Philtranco/JAC Liner Turbina Station, National Highway, Turbina, Calamba, Laguna
- San Pablo Grand Terminal, San Pablo City, Laguna
- SM Lipa Grand Terminal, Lipa, Batangas
- Bolbok, Batangas City
- Lucena City Grand Central Terminal
- SM Seaside City, Cebu City

== Destinations ==
Metro Manila

- EDSA Kamuning, Quezon City
- Araneta City Bus Port, Cubao Quezon City
- LRT Taft Avenue, Buendia, Pasay
- Parañaque Integrated Terminal Exchange, Parañaque
- Alabang, Muntinlupa

Provincial destinations

- Santo Domingo, Biñan, Laguna
- Southwoods Mall Transport Terminal, Biñan, Laguna
- Balibago, Santa Rosa, Laguna
- Santa Rosa Integrated Terminal, Santa Rosa, Laguna
- CentroMall Cabuyao, Pulo, Cabuyao, Laguna
- Turbina, Calamba, Laguna
- SM Lipa Grand Terminal/Robinsons Place Lipa, Lipa, Batangas
- Batangas City Grand Terminal
- Batangas International Port, Batangas City
- Lucena City Grand Central Terminal
- Port of Dalahican, Lucena City

Under Cebu MyBus

- SM City Cebu, Cebu City
- SM Seaside City
- Talisay City, Cebu

Former destinations

- Pagbilao, Quezon
- Lemery, Batangas
- Santa Cruz, Laguna (Note: Under Laguna Trans subsidiary)
- General Mariano Alvarez, Cavite (Note: Under Route 29: PITX–General Mariano Alvarez)
- Pacita Complex, San Pedro, Laguna (Note: Under Phil Touristers Inc.)
- Robinsons Place Antipolo, Antipolo, Rizal (Note: Under Route 9: Cubao–Antipolo)

== See also ==
- List of bus companies of the Philippines
