= JAC Liner =

Bus company in the Philippines

- A Different Units Of JAC LINER
- Founded: 1987; 39 years ago
- Headquarters: Mapagmahal St., Brgy. Pinyahan corner EDSA Kamias, Quezon City
- Locale: Luzon
- Service area: Metro Manila; Laguna; Quezon; Marinduque
- Service type: City & Provincial Operation
- Fleet: 400+
- Operator: JAC Liner
- Chief executive: Jaime Chua
- Website: Official website

JAC Liner is one of the largest bus companies in the Philippines serving the riding public en route to Southern Luzon provinces which includes key destinations in the provinces of Laguna, Batangas, Quezon and Marinduque.

== History ==
JAC (Jaime A. Chua) Liner, owned by the Chua Family, began operating in April 1987 as a sole proprietorship operating second hand buses. The owner's family backyard lot functioned as the company's repair garage and head office.

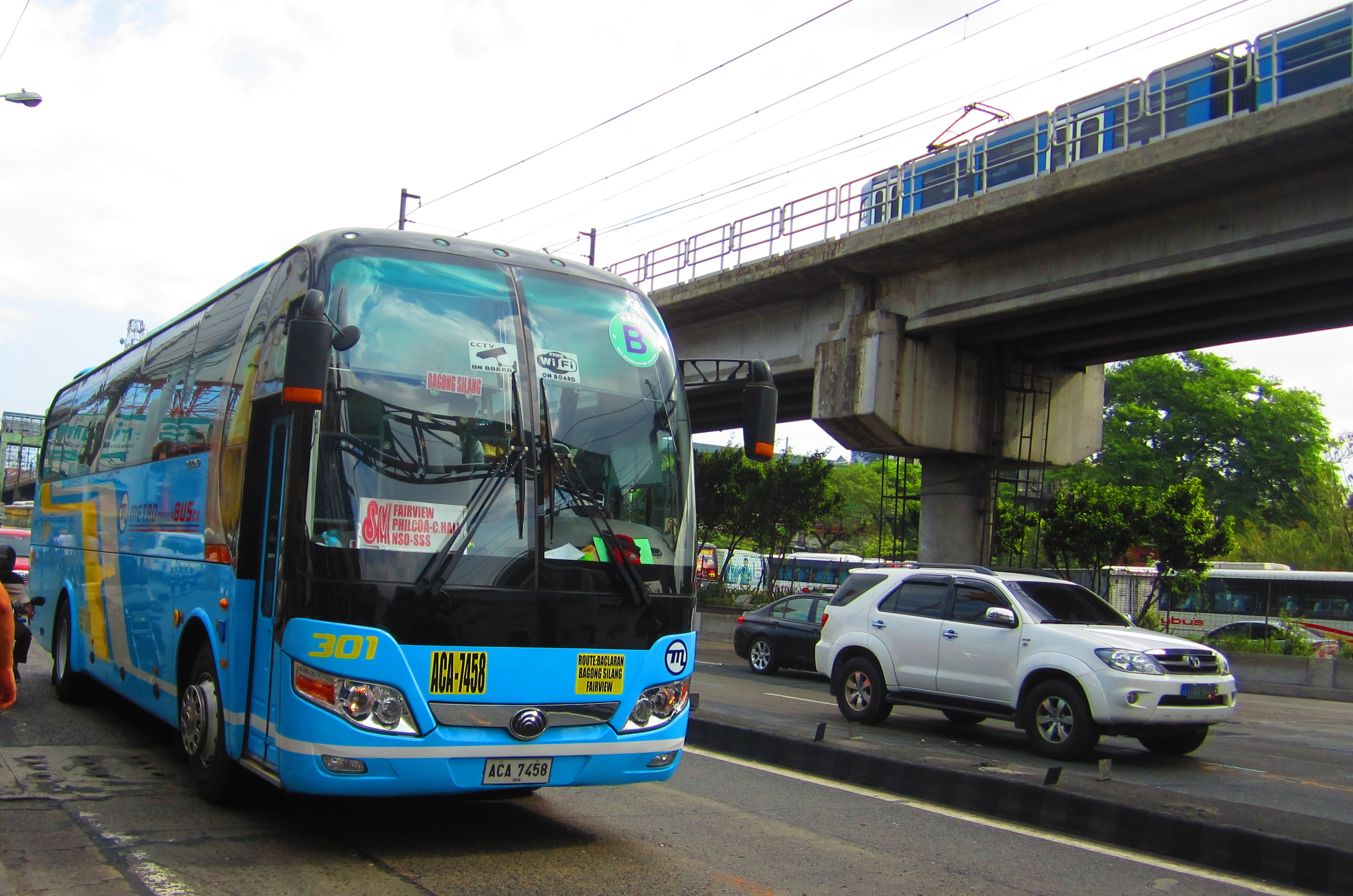
Metro Manila Bus Company's Yutong ZK6107H.

In 1988, JAC Liner acquired eight additional second-hand buses from other bus operators. These were rehabilitated and made operational. A year after, they were assisted by the Bus Installment Purchase Program (BIPP), a program that would allow them to purchase buses on installment basis which allowed them to purchase 26 new buses and was granted to have additional franchises along EDSA.

In March 1992, they were formally incorporated as JAC Liner. Two years later, they moved their operations to the Southern Tagalog region, where it established itself as one of the largest bus companies in the country.

In 2004, the founders decided to go on semi-retirement and passed on the day-to-day management of the company to their children while retaining long-term policy-making functions of the corporation. In December of that same year, JAC Liner formed their first subsidiary, Lucena Lines, with a fleet of around 60 buses.

In 2010, JAC Liner bought the Tarlac City-based company Dionisio R. De Leon Express and established Pangasinan Solid North Transit. From 30 or so bus units, Pangasinan Solid North expanded their fleet size up to around 150 bus units. In 2011, JAC Liner became the first bus company in the country to offer free WiFi on board through a partnership with the Philippine Long Distance Telephone Company.

In March 2014, JAC Liner took over the Santa Cruz line of Green Star Express. Months later, JAC Liner acquired the whole franchise of Greenstar and their remaining buses were transferred to Lucena Lines, but they retained some units under the Green Star Express name.

In 2015, JAC Liner took over the Dagupan Bus Company and the provincial operations of Fermina Express, which had a total of 300 buses combined. The company also debuted a new city bus subsidiary, Metro Manila Bus Company, with routes from Baclaran to Fairview via EDSA and Quezon Avenue.

In 2021, JAC Liner acquired JAM Liner and JAM Transit to expand their route network.

In 2023, JAC Liner took over Pacita-based Cher Transport, which was among the list of well-known bus companies in Metro Manila. The latter's bus units and routes were later integrated into Metro Manila Bus Company, expanding its operations as far as Balibago, Santa Rosa, Laguna.

In 2025, JAC Liner subsidiary Pangasinan Solid North Transit had its operations suspended for a month after one of its buses namely PSNTI bus no. 1513, a Dagupan Bus Co. unit operating under PSNTI caused a multiple-vehicle collision at the SCTEX toll plaza in Tarlac City, killing 10 people and injuring 37 others, with initial investigations suggesting the bus driver fell asleep. The Land Transportation Franchising and Regulatory Board (LTFRB) initially issued a 30-day suspension for 15 specific units of Dagupan Bus Co., which was quickly followed by a Department of Transportation (DOTr) order suspending the entire fleet of Pangasinan Solid North Transit, encompassing nearly 300 buses. The same year, the remnants of Dagupan Bus's units were gradually integrated into the expanding operations of Solid North Transit, together with more than a dozen units from Victory Liner's former Caloocan - Dagupan and Cubao - Dagupan routes. JAC Liner and their subsidiaries also introduced daily pet-friendly schedules on all routes for the convenience of their pet-carrying commuters riding their buses.

== Subsidiaries ==
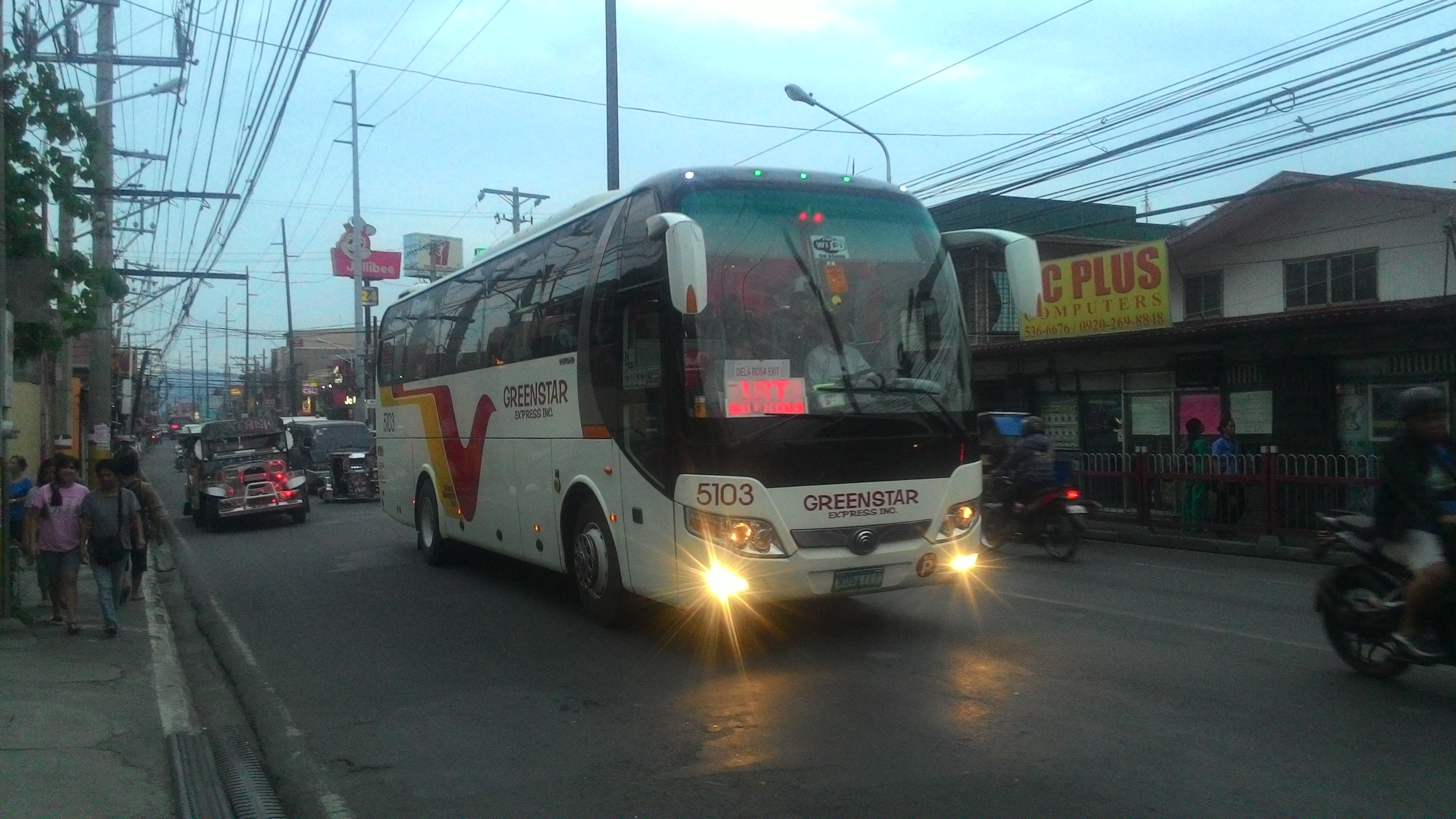
A Green Star Express bus heading to JAC Liner's LRT Buendia terminal.

- Lucena Lines
- JAM Liner
- Pangasinan Solid North Transit
- Dagupan Bus Company
- Metro Manila Bus Company

== Discontinued subsidiaries ==
These are their discontinued subsidiaries / bus company names which they bought before:

- Dionisio R. De Leon Express (now under Pangasinan Solid North Transit)
- Green Star Express (Sta. Cruz line now under Lucena Lines)
- Fermina Express [Provincial Operations] (renamed and now under Pangasinan Solid North Transit)
- Laguna Express (renamed and now under Lucena Lines)
- CHER Transport (renamed and now under Metro Manila Bus Company)

== Fleet ==
A Yutong ZK6107HA Of JAC LINER.

JAC Liner runs ordinary and air-conditioned bus units. Recently, the company has started to offer deluxe and premium point-to-point trips as well. The majority of their buses are made from Yutong as they were the former distributor of the latter in the country, before transferring its distributorship to King Long.

JAC Liner Fleet
Make	Model	Notes
Auto Bus Transport Industries	SR NV620 Replica Bus Body	
Auto Bus Transport Industries	Yutong ZK6100H	Used for driver tests and trainings
SRMWI Daewoo	BS106	MMBC only
SRMWI Daewoo	BV115	PSNTI only
SRMWI Daewoo	BS120S 2nd Generation	MMBC only
Daewoo	BAR GD Marcopolo Replica	PSNTI only
Yutong	ZK6100H	
Yutong	ZK6105HA	PSNTI only
Yutong	ZK6107H	MMBC and PSNTI only
Yutong	ZK6107HA	
Yutong	ZK6119HA	
Yutong	ZK6119H2	
Yutong	ZK6118HQ	Used for recruitment drives
Yutong	ZK6122HD9	
Higer	KLQ6126LY	
Higer	KLQ6126YQ	PSNTI only
Higer	KLQ6127LA	PSNTI only
King Long	XMQ6117Y3	PSNTI only
King Long	XMQ6112AY	PSNTI and LLI only
King Long	XMQ6127AYW01	
King Long	XMQ6127J	
Golden Dragon	XML6102 Splendour	PSNTI only
Golden Dragon	XML6103 Marcopolo	PSNTI only
Golden Dragon	XML6103J Snowfox	PSNTI only
Nissan Diesel UD SRMWI	PKB212	MMBC only
Volvo	B7R Autodelta	MMBC only

== Bus terminals ==
=== Metro Manila ===
These are the main bus terminals and satellite terminals in Metro Manila.

- Kamias Terminal: EDSA cor. Mapagmahal St., Brgy. Kamias, Quezon City (main hub)
- Avenida Terminal: Doroteo Jose Street, Santa Cruz, Manila
- One Ayala Satellite Terminal: Ayala Tower One, Ayala Avenue, Makati City
- Buendia Terminal: Sen. Gil J. Puyat Ave. cor Donada St., Pasay City
- Ayala Malls Manila Bay: Aseana Ave, Tambo, Parañaque
- Market! Market! Satellite Terminal: McKinley Pkwy, Market! Market!, Taguig

=== Provincial ===
These are their major hubs in Southern Luzon provinces.

- Biñan Terminal: P. Burgos St., Brgy. Sto Domingo, Biñan 4024, Laguna
- Balibago Terminal (for MMBC/JAM only): Francisco A. Canicosa Ave., Balibago Complex, Brgy. Balibago, Santa Rosa, Laguna
- Calamba Terminal: Crossing, Brgy. 1, Calamba, Laguna
- Santa Cruz Terminal (Laguna): National Highway, Brgy. Biñan, Pagsanjan, Laguna
- Turbina Terminal: Philtranco/JAC Liner Turbina Station, National Highway, Turbina, Calamba, Laguna
- San Pablo Grand Terminal: Brgy. San Rafael, San Pablo, Laguna
- Mauban Terminal: Maharlika Hwy, Brgy. Polo, Mauban, Quezon
- Lucena City Grand Central Terminal: Brgy. Ilayang Dupay, Lucena City, Quezon
- Port of Dalahican Endpoint Terminal: Brgy. Dalahican, Lucena City, Quezon
- Santa Cruz Public Market (Marinduque): Brgy. Manlibunan, Santa Cruz, Marinduque

== See also ==
- List of bus companies of the Philippines
