= Fermina Express =

Bus company in the Philippines

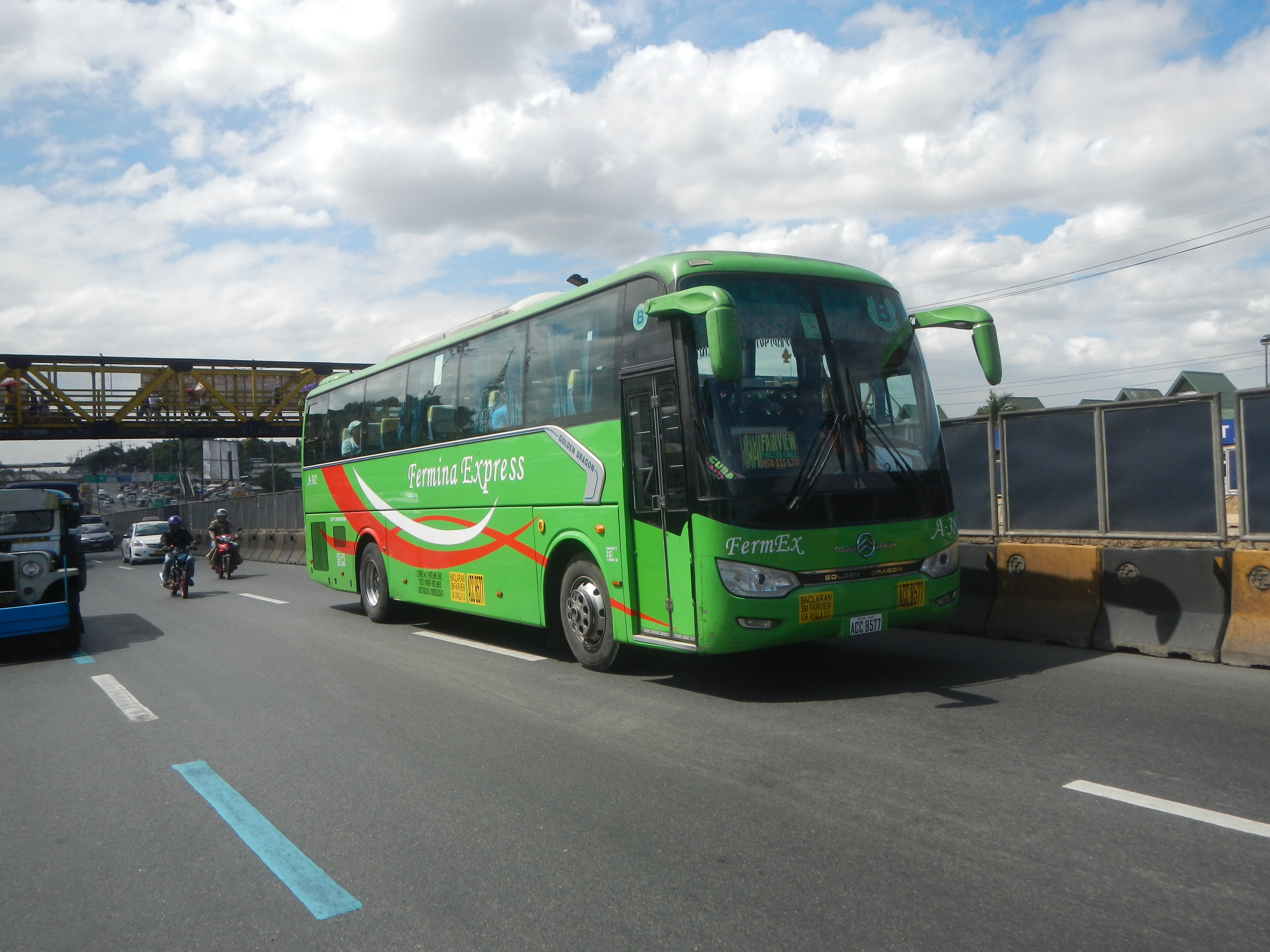
- A Fermina Express bound to SM Fairview at Commonwealth Avenue
- Parent: Mencorp Transport Systems Incorporated
- Founded: 1996; 30 years ago
- Headquarters: Cubao, Quezon City
- Service area: Metro Manila
- Service type: City Operation
- Alliance: Farview Bus, Inc.
- Fleet: 160+ Buses
- Operator: Fermina Express

Fermina Express, Corporation (FermEx) is a commuter bus company servicing Metro Manila. The company is under the umbrella of Mencorp Transport Systems Incorporated.

== History ==
Fermina Express started in 1996 with services within Metro Manila that plies over EDSA corridor, and has a connecting service from Cubao and Pasay to the cities of Dagupan and San Carlos in Pangasinan and Cuyapo in Nueva Ecija via Paniqui, Tarlac. The bus line uses NLEX for northbound trips with a stopover at Mabalacat Bus Terminal (Dau). Connecting via SCTEX, the bus exits at Concepcion then towards Tarlac City with another stopover along MacArthur Highway. The bus then proceeds to its final destination.

In 2008, Fermina was meted a one-month preventive suspension by the Land Transportation Franchising and Regulatory Board after one of its buses was involved in a collision that killed five people. In 2011, Fermina was identified by the Metro Manila Development Authority (MMDA) as among the bus firms with the most traffic violations for the year.

In 2014, a burning Fermina bus that was abandoned by its driver and conductor started a fire that razed a truck and four stores along Commonwealth Avenue, Quezon City. That same year, a Fermina bus was hit in the rear by another city bus, which injured at least 22 people.

In 2015, Fermina's provincial routes were taken over by JAC Liner Inc. Despite the change in management, JAC Liner retained the Fermina Express name, but the buses were repainted to match JAC Liner's livery. Its provincial routes were eventually incorporated into JAC Liner's subsidiary Pangasinan Solid North Transit, Inc.

== Fleet ==
Fermina fields Yutong and Golden Dragon buses for its fleet.

- Golden Dragon XML6103J12
- Golden Dragon XML6125J28C
- Yutong ZK6105H

== Destinations ==
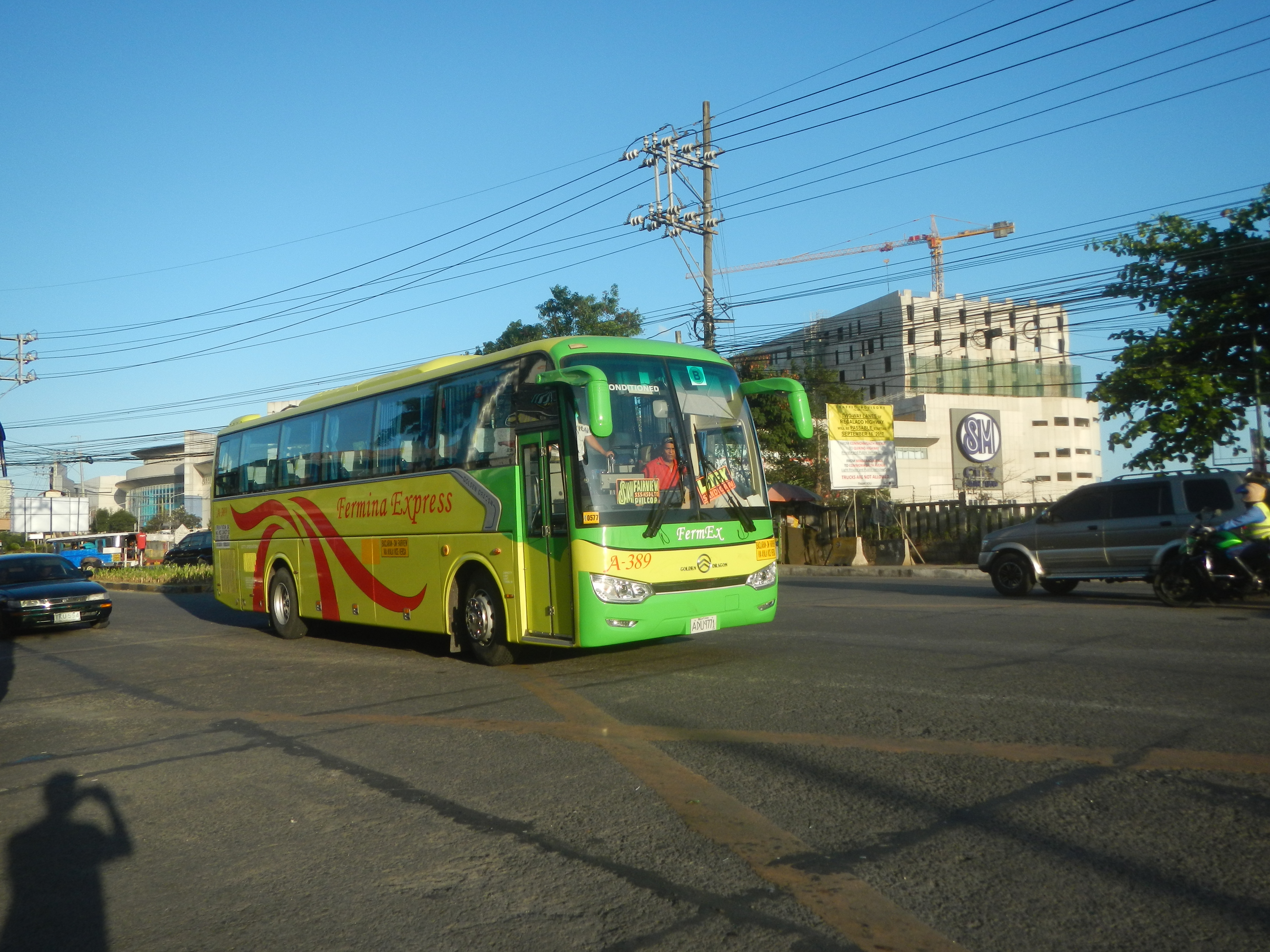
A Fermina Express bus in Novaliches, Quezon City.

- Sapang Palay to PITX via Quezon Avenue.
- EDSA Carousel

== Former destinations ==
- Mabalacat, Pampanga (Mabalacat Bus Terminal)
- Tarlac City, Tarlac
- Cuyapo, Nueva Ecija
- Bayambang, Pangasinan
- Dagupan
- Malasiqui, Pangasinan
- San Carlos City, Pangasinan
- Angat, Bulacan
- Ninoy Aquino International Airport Terminal 1 & 2
- Alabang, Muntinlupa.

== See also ==
- JAC Liner
- List of bus companies of the Philippines
