= Dionisio R. De Leon Express =

Philippine bus company

De Leon Express
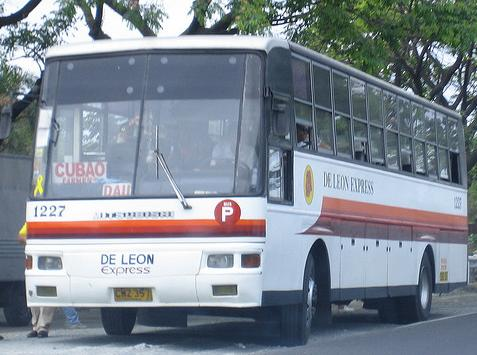
- De Leon bus along MacArthur Highway
- Founded: 1998
- Defunct: 2010
- Headquarters: Tarlac City, Tarlac, Philippines
- Service area: Luzon
- Service type: Land Transport
- Fleet: 30+
- Operator: Dionisio R. De Leon

Dionisio R. De Leon Express or simply De Leon Express was a Philippine bus company based in Tarlac City, with approximately 30 units and operations throughout Northern Luzon. It was founded and manager by its owner, Dionisio R. De Leon for which the company was named.

== History ==
The company started in 1998 by its owner, Dionisio R. De Leon. Using his name as the company's trade-name, his company started to operate routes from Tarlac City to San Carlos, Pangasinan with only two bus units. After seeing a good potential to expand the business, De Leon Express added to its bus fleet and expanded its routes to Dagupan, Pangasinan and Dau Bus Terminal, eventually including a direct route to Metro Manila.

However, in 2010, it was discovered by authorities that the operation in Metro Manila was "out of line". meaning that De Leon Express had no authority to provide service all the way to the metro. Their buses were also found to be aging and in need of maintenance or replacement. They were cited by the Metro Manila Development Authority as colorum vehicles: "Unregistered Subs/Replacement Engine" or bus units with no registration or needed for engine replacement due to failure upon having series of emission tests.

De Leon Express continued to operate and was eventually sold to JAC Liner, which later merged with Pangasinan Solid North Transit.

== Destinations ==
Former routes of De Leon Express before sake to JAC Liner.

- Dagupan - Cubao via Dau TPLEX Carmen or SCTEX Concepcion
- Tarlac City - San Carlos
- San Carlos - Cubao (Via Basista/SCTEX Concepcion)
- San Carlos - Cubao (Via Malasiqui/SCTEX Concepcion)
- San Carlos - Cubao/Kamias (Via Dau SCTEX-Concepcion, Tarlac)
- Bayambang - Cubao (via Dau)
- Dau - Cubao or Aveinda

== See also ==
- JAC Liner
- List of bus companies of the Philippines
