= Victory Liner =

Bus company in the Philippines

Victory Liner, Inc.

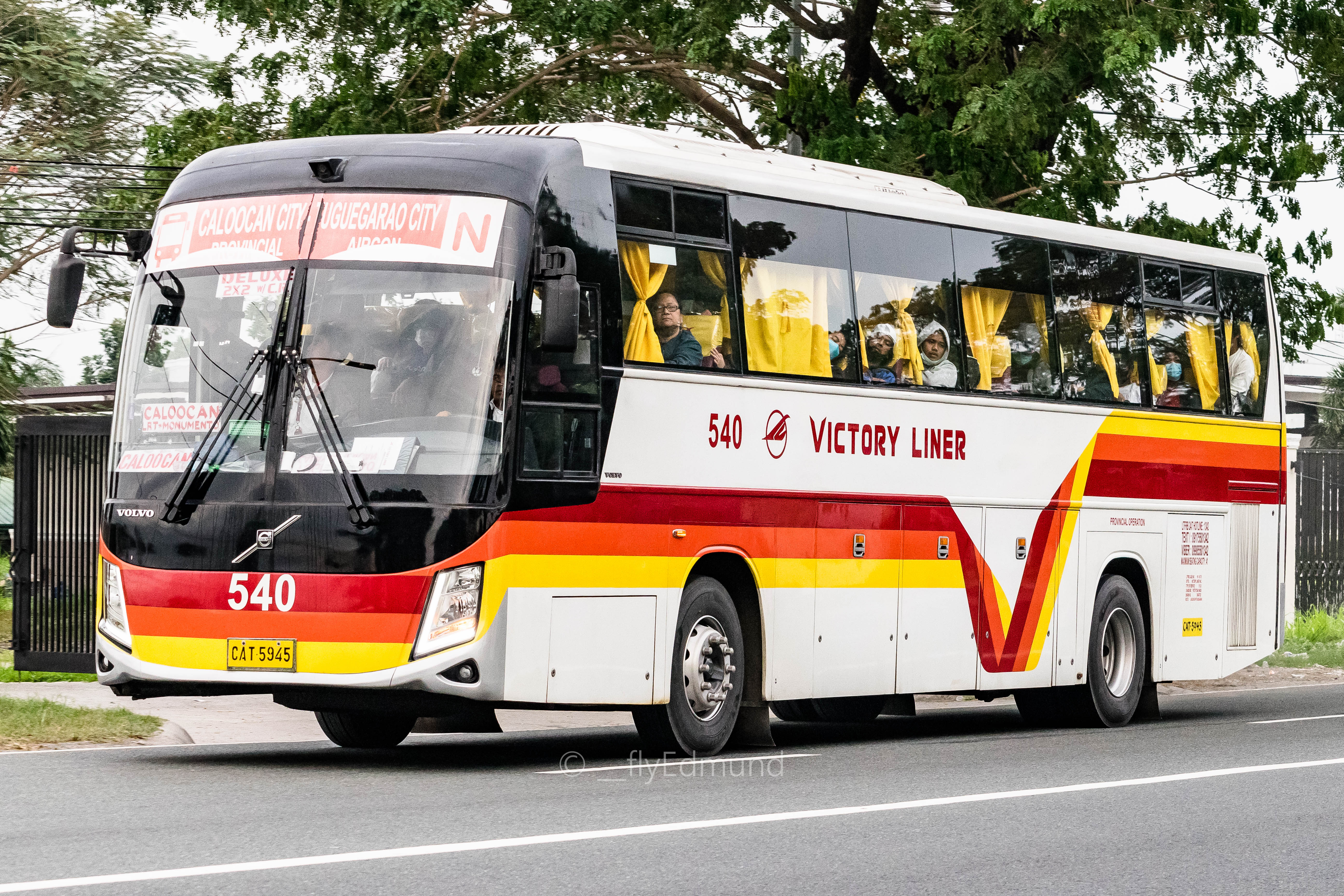
- A Victory Liner bus heading back to Caloocan from Tuguegarao.
- Founded: October 15, 1945; 81 years ago
- Headquarters: 713 Rizal Avenue Ext., Brgy. 72, Grace Park West, Caloocan, Philippines
- Locale: Luzon
- Service area: Metro Manila; Central Luzon; Pangasinan; Cordillera Administrative Region; Cagayan Valley
- Service type: Provincial Operation
- Hubs: Caloocan
- Fleet: 1,000+ bus units
- Operator: Victory Liner, Inc.
- President: Marivic del Pilar
- Website: www.victoryliner.com

Victory Liner, Inc. (VLI) is a bus company in the Philippines that was established in 1945 by José Hernandez, is recognized as one of the primary providers of bus transportation in the Philippines, servicing key locations across Luzon. Initially using a fleet of repurposed military vehicles, the company was instrumental in meeting the post-WWII demand for public transport.

Over the years, Victory Liner has strategically grown its operations, upgrading its fleet and expanding service routes to meet the evolving needs of travelers. Today, it operates a comprehensive network that connects Central and Northern Luzon provinces, such as Zambales, Pampanga, Bulacan, Benguet Baguio, Pangasinan, Bataan, Nueva Vizcaya, Kalinga, Isabela, Nueva Ecija, and Cagayan.

Victory Liner deploys more than 1,000 buses in its daily operations.

== Etymology ==
The name "Victory Liner" draws its inspiration from the post-World War II era sentiment. In the 1940s, the term "Victory Joe," a nod to America's victory, resonated widely within the Philippines. José Hernandez, correlating his first name "Jose" with the English equivalent "Joe," deemed "Victory Liner" an apt and evocative name for his emerging transport business.

This naming choice coincided with the company's early expansion, incorporating a team that included Hernandez as a driver-mechanic and Angel Mangahas in a similar role, with Leonardo D. Trinidad (a brother-in-law) as the conductor, Santiago Crisostomo as the mechanic, and Marta, Hernandez's wife, overseeing finances. Subsequently, Eugenio D. Trinidad, another brother-in-law, joined as a helper-conductor, contributing to the growing family operation.

== History ==
Victory Liner terminal in Baguio.

Victory Liner's beginnings trace back from the years of Japanese occupation in the country. Jose I. Hernandez, a mechanic from Macabebe, Pampanga, collected bits and pieces of machinery, metals and spare parts from abandoned United States Armed Forces vehicles, intending to build a delivery truck from scratch for his family's resale business of rice, corn, vegetables and their home-made laundry soap. Upon completion of the truck, he was surprised to see that what he envisioned to be a delivery truck turned out to be more like a bus.

On October 15, 1945, Mr. Hernandez's first bus plied the Manila–Olongapo–Manila line. He was the driver and Leonardo D. Trinidad (a brother-in-law) was his conductor. Later on, the Hernandezes incorporated the business and Victory Liner became one of the main transport modes to shuttle passengers and goods to and from Manila and the provinces of Bulacan, Pampanga, Bataan, Zambales, Pangasinan, La Union, Tarlac, Benguet, Nueva Ecija, Nueva Vizcaya, Isabela, Cagayan, Apayao, and Kalinga.

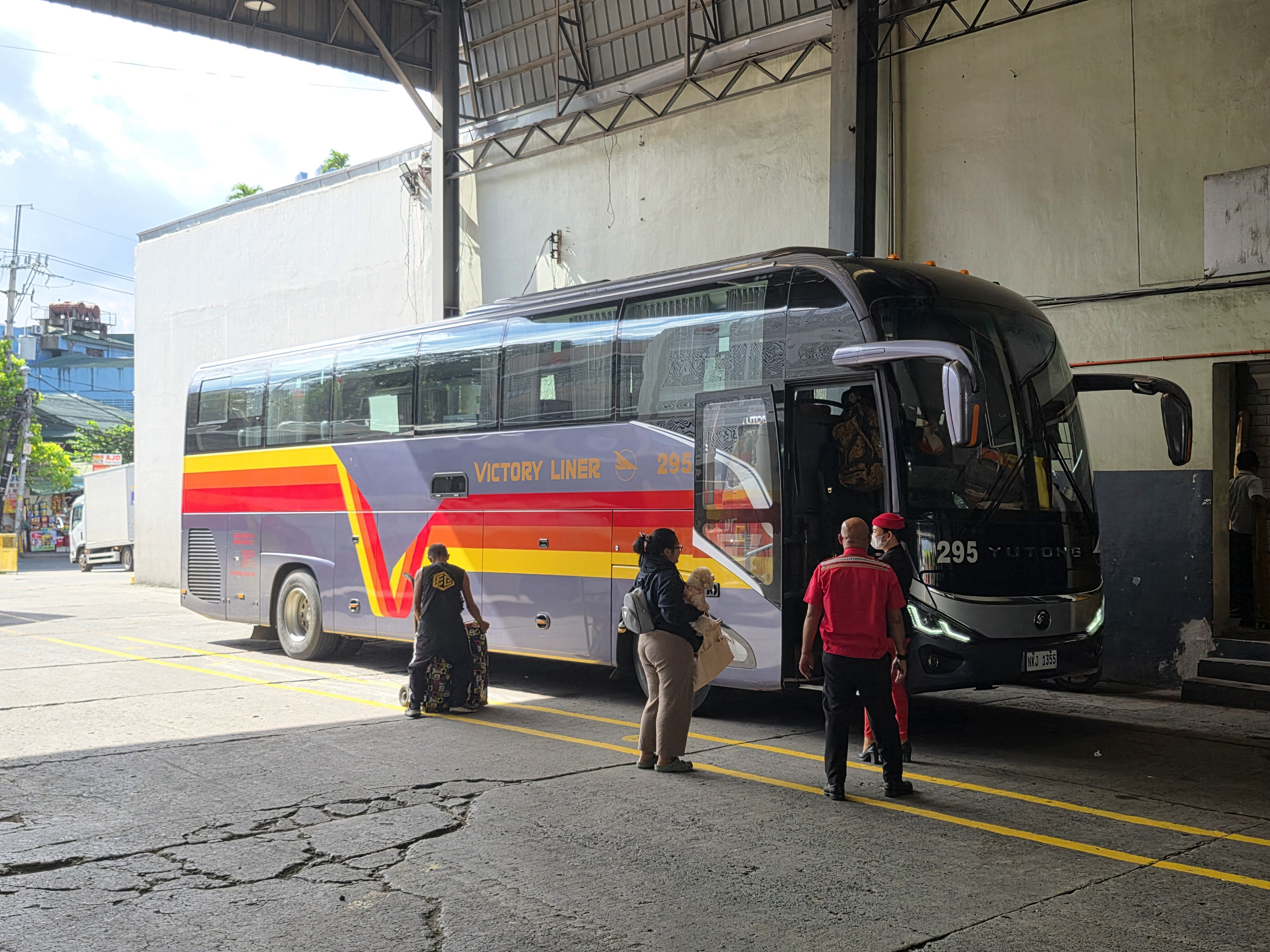
A Yutong ZK6128H "C12PRO" first-class bus with the "Chairman's Bus" livery first introduced in 2024.

In 2007, Victory Liner introduced its deluxe class (later first class) for its Baguio and Cagayan Valley services. The company was eventually passed on to the son of Jose Hernandez, Johnny Hernandez.

In 2011, Victory Liner initially equipped 50 air-conditioned buses with Sun Cellular Wireless Broadband to allow passengers with Wi-Fi-capable devices to log on to the Internet.

In April 2012, Victory Liner partnered with AirAsia Philippines to provide shuttle service for inbound and outbound passengers of Clark International Airport.

In August 2023, Victory Liner classified its bus services as "Express" (via Expressway) and "Inner Cities" (via provincial towns) to make simplified travel choices for the passengers.

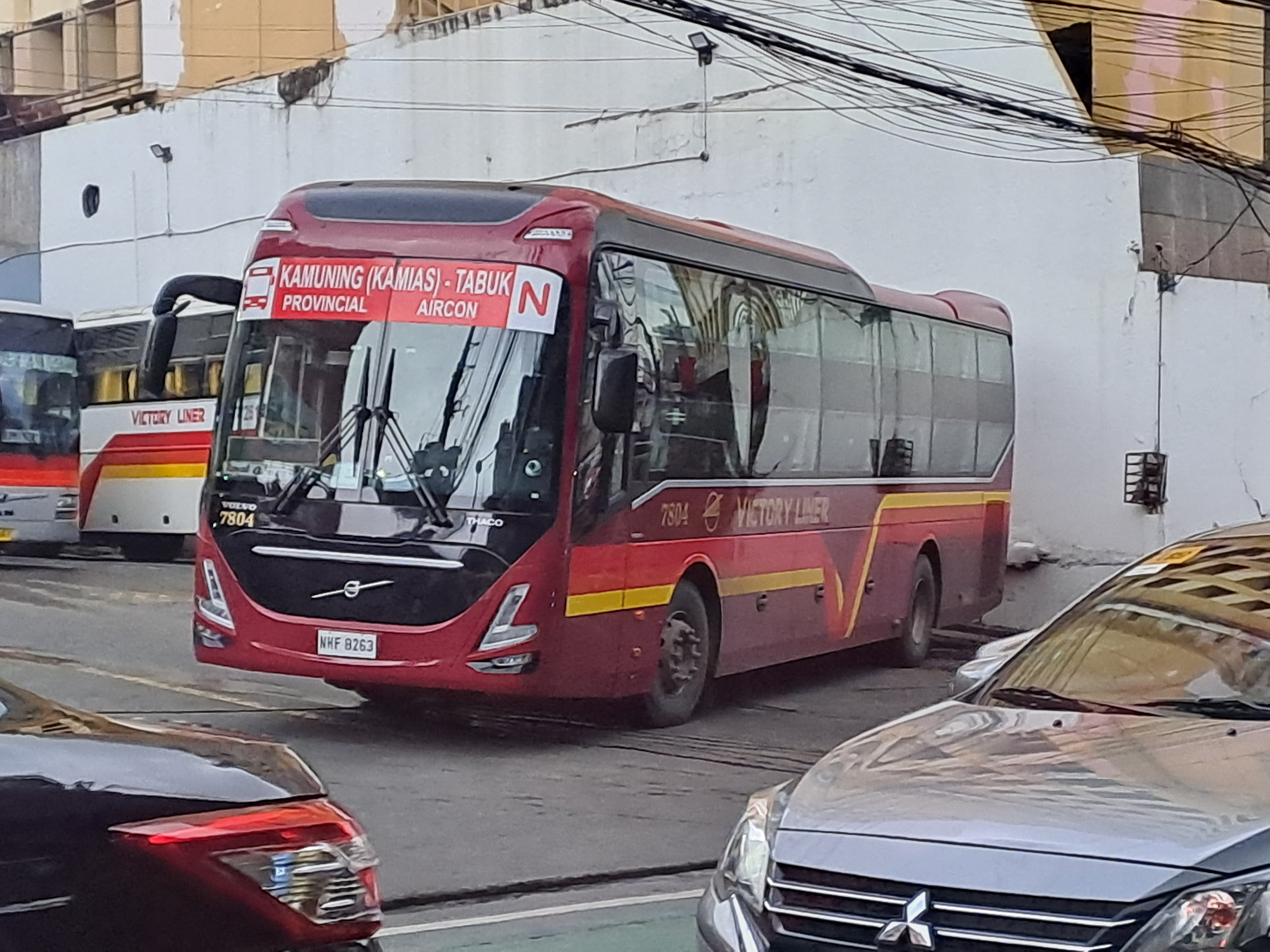
The launch of the Royal Class bus in late 2023 gained attention for passengers interested for a sleeper bus service.

On October 13, 2023, during the 78th anniversary event of Victory Liner, the bus company launched its Royal Class sleeper bus for its Baguio, Tabuk, and Tuguegarao services. The new buses were manufactured by Volvo, with Thaco assmebling the structural body. The videos of the sleeper buses went viral on social media, causing some Royal Class trips to be sold out due to popular demand. Passenger services of the Royal Class sleeper buses begun on October 23. As part of the anniversary, Victory Liner also restored its "Jardinera" vintage bus. The type, which was the very first bus that plied the Manila–Olongapo route in 1945, embarked on a "Nostalgia Ride" tour around several tourist spots in Baguio.

In November 2024, in its vision of carbon-neutral sustainable transport, VLI launched the country's first two electric buses (Quezon City–San Fernando route). The 65-seater Higer Buses each have a 485 kWh battery for a 350 to 400 kilometers journey.

== Fleet ==
Victory Liner maintains and operates different buses from various manufacturers.

=== Current ===
Almazora Motors Corporation

- Almazora Tourist Star RE bus body
  - Hyundai Aero Space LD
  - MAN R39 18.350 HOCL
- Almazora Tourist Star Regio bus body
  - MAN R39 18.350 HOCL
  - MAN RR3 19.360 HOCL

Autodelta Coach Builders

- Autodelta 12-meter coach body
  - Volvo B7R
  - Volvo B8R
- Autodelta Marcopolo Audace 1050 replica
  - Volvo B11R

Del Monte Motor Works, Inc.

- Del Monte Motor Works DM14 Series 1 bus body
  - MAN R39 18.350 HOCL
- Del Monte Motor Works DM14 Series 3 bus body
  - Hino RK1JST
  - Hyundai Aero Space LS
- Del Monte Motor Works DM16 S2 HID bus body
  - Volvo B7R
  - Volvo B8R
- Del Monte Motor Works DM18 bus body
  - MAN RR3 19.360
- Del Monte Motor Works DM23 bus body
  - MAN RR3 19.360

Higer Bus Company Limited

- A80 KLQ6123K
- V12 KLQ6126LY
- V12 KLQ6126YEV
- KLQ6926G

Hino Motors Philippines

- Hino Grandeza II bus body
  - RN8J
- Hino Grandmetro bus body
  - Hino RK1JST
- Hino SBC-08 bus body
  - Hino RK1JMT

Hyundai Motor Company

- Universe
  - Space Classic (some units operating as a cargo bus)
  - Space Comfort
  - Space Luxury
- Super Aero City
- Unicity

Kia Motors Corporation

- New Granbird
  - KM959SX Bluesky
  - KM959S Parkway
  - KM959H Sunshine

Santarosa Motor Works Inc.

- Santarosa Exfoh bus body
  - Nissan Diesel RB46S (operating as a cargo bus)
  - Nissan Diesel JA450SSN (operating as a cargo bus)
  - Nissan Diesel SP215NSB (operating as a cargo bus)
- Santarosa Cityliner bus body
  - Daewoo BH117H
  - Daewoo BV115 (first generation and older units operating as a cargo bus)
  - Daewoo BF106 (non air-conditioned)
  - Daewoo BS106
- Santarosa Jetliner bus body
  - Daewoo BV115
- Santarosa Modulo bus body
  - MAN RR3 19.360
  - MAN R39 18.350
- Nissan Diesel PKB212N (some units operating as a cargo bus)
- Iveco Euromidi CC150

Truong Hai Group Corporation (THACO)

- Mobihome
  - Volvo B8R
- Bluesky 120S
  - Volvo B8R

Xiamen Golden Dragon Bus Co. Ltd.

- XML6103J92 "Marcopolo II"

Zhengzhou Yutong Group Co., Ltd.

- Yutong ZK6105H
- Yutong ZK6107HA
- Yutong ZK6122HD9
- Yutong ZK6128H "C12 Pro"

Zhongtong Bus Holding Co., Ltd.

- Zhongtong LCK6129H

=== Former ===
Almazora Motors Corporation

- Almazora Lion's Star bus body
  - MAN A55 18.310 HOCL
- Almazora Tourist Star SH bus body
  - Nissan Diesel RB46S
- Almazora Travel Star bus body
  - MAN A55 18.310 HOCL

Anhui Ankai Automobile Co., Ltd.

- Ankai HFF6110KO6D

Bataan Automotive Remanufacturing Corporation

- Nissan Diesel RB46S

Del Monte Motor Works, Inc.

- Del Monte Motor Works DM10 Series 2 bus body
  - Hyundai Aero Express HSX
- Del Monte Motor Works DM12 Series 1 bus body
  - Nissan Diesel RB46S
- Del Monte Motor Works Euro Bus replica
  - Nissan Diesel RB46S
- Del Monte Motor Works "Exfoh" replica
  - MAN 754 16.290 HOCL
  - Nissan Diesel RB46S
- Del Monte Motor Works Lion's Star bus body
  - MAN A55 18.310 HOCL

Guilin Daewoo Bus Co., Ltd.

- GL6127HKC1

Higer Bus Company Limited

- V91 KLQ6119QE3

Hino Motors Philippines

- Hino "Exfoh" bus body replica
  - Nissan Diesel RB31S
  - Hino RF821

Hyundai Motor Company

- Hyundai Aero Space LS
- Hyundai Aero Queen
- Hyundai Aero City (1st-generation)
- Universe
  - Xpress Noble

Isuzu Motors Ltd.

- Isuzu Cubic (1st-generation)

Karl Kässbohrer Fahrzeugwerk (Kassbohrer-Setra)

- Setra S215H

Kia Motors Corporation

- Granbird (1st-generation)
  - KM948 SD-II Parkway
  - KM949H HD Sunshine

King Long United Automotive Industry Co., Ltd.

- King Long XMQ6118Y
- King Long XMQ6119T
- King Long XMQ6126Y
- King Long XMQ6117Y3

Mitsubishi Fuso Truck and Bus Corporation

- Aero Bus P-MS725S

Nissan Diesel Motor Co., Ltd.

- Fuji Heavy Industries 5E bus body
  - Nissan Diesel UA31S
- Nissan Diesel Space Runner RA
  - Fuji Heavy Industries 7E bus body
    - Nissan Diesel UA460

Nissan Diesel Philippines Corporation

- Nissan Diesel Euro Trans bus body
  - Nissan Diesel JA430SAN
  - Nissan Diesel RB46S

Partex Auto Body (Hino Motors Philippines Corporation)

- Grandeza bus body
  - Nissan Diesel JA450SSN
- Generic non air-conditioned model bus body
  - Nissan Diesel RB46S
- Generic air-conditioned model bus body
  - Nissan Diesel RB46S

Trans-Oriental Motor Builders, Inc.

- Golden Dragon XML6127 Marcopolo II replica
  - Nissan Diesel RB46S

Santarosa Motor Works

- Santarosa AKR bus body
  - Nissan Diesel CPB87N
- Santarosa Exfoh Hi-Deck bus body
  - MAN A55 18.310 HOCL
- Santarosa Exfoh bus body
  - Nissan Diesel CPB87N
  - Nissan Diesel RB31S
  - Nissan Diesel RB46S
- Santarosa Explorer bus body
  - MAN L68 14.223 HOC
- Santarosa Flexstar bus body
  - Nissan Diesel RB46S
- Santarosa Modulo bus body
  - MAN 754 16.290 HOCL
  - MAN A85 18.280 HOCL
  - MAN A55 18.310 HOCL
- Santarosa SDX bus body
  - Nissan Diesel RB31S
- Santarosa SR615 Flexi bus body
  - Nissan Diesel RB46S
- Santarosa SR620 NV bus body
  - Nissan Diesel RB46S
  - Hyundai Aero Express HSX

Zhengzhou Yutong Group Co., Ltd.

- Yutong ZK6100H
- Yutong ZK6119HA

Zyle Daewoo Bus

- FX120 Cruising Star
- FX212 Super Cruiser

Modified & Custom-built buses by Five Star Bus Body

- MAN A55 18.310 HOCL
- Nissan Diesel RB46S

== Fare classes ==
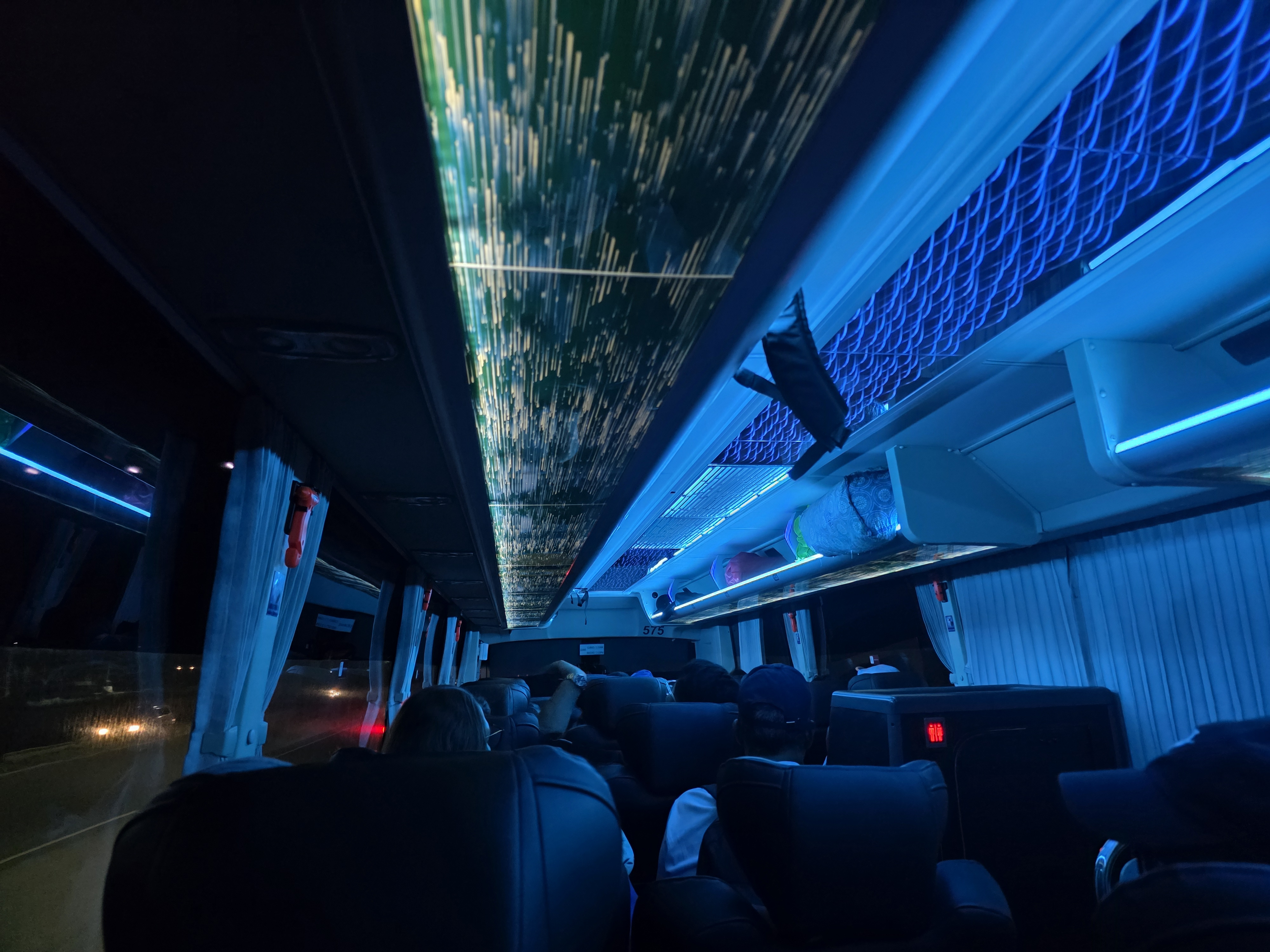
Interior of a First Class bus in 2026

Every unit of their buses has its own fare classes:

- Ordinary Fare: 3×2 seating (61/66 seater)
- Economy Airconditioned: 3x2 seating with charging ports (61/66 seater)
- Regular Airconditioned: 2×2 seating with charging ports each seat (45/49 seater)
- Deluxe: 2×2 seating with more leg room, USB A and C charging ports, and onboard lavatory (41 seater. Some has 45/49 seats which it depends on the length a bus.)
- First Class: 2×1 lazyboy seating (some units in couch type) with USB A and C charging ports, free complimentary snacks with bottled mineral water, and onboard lavatory (29 seater)
- Royal Class: 1×1×1 double decker reclinable bed with a curtain in every suite, a USB A and C charging ports, a personal lamp, cup holder, free amenity kit, free blanket and free complimentary snacks with bottled mineral water and onboard lavatory (28 beds)

Note: Baguio First Class and Royal Class have a stewardess, while Cagayan/Isabela/Tabuk have no stewardess, and have been replaced by bus conductors. Also, both First Class and Royal Class passengers have access to The Lounge, an air-conditioned room with free unlimited coffee for everyone, and there is a microwave to heat your food if you want to.

Audio and Video systems and Wi-Fi are standard on all of its classes.

== Stations and terminals ==
=== Metro Manila ===
- Avenida - 833 Rizal Avenue, Sta. Cruz, Manila
- Caloocan - Rizal Avenue Extension, Caloocan
- Cubao - 651 EDSA, Immaculate Conception, Quezon City
- Kamias - 766 EDSA corner East Avenue, Pinyahan, Quezon City
- Parañaque Integrated Terminal Exchange - Tambo, Parañaque
- Pasay - 712 EDSA, Pasay
- Sampaloc - Sampaloc Bus Terminal, Earnshaw Street, Sampaloc, Manila
- Tutuban Center - Tondo, Manila

=== Provincial ===
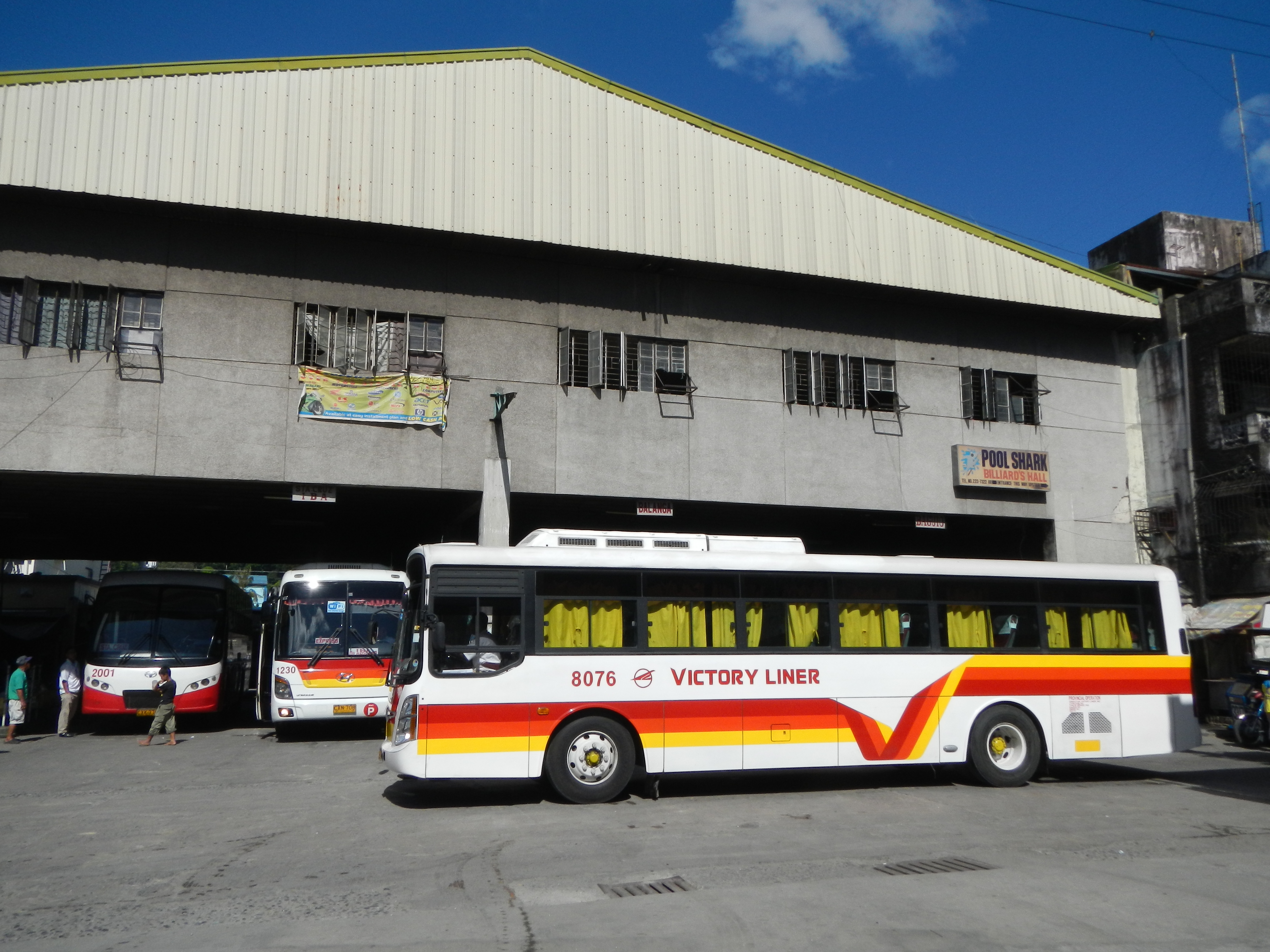
Victory Liner's terminal in Olongapo

Central Luzon

- Pampanga
  - Apalit - San Vicente, Apalit, Pampanga
  - San Fernando - Jose Abad Santos Avenue, Dolores, San Fernando, Pampanga
  - Mabalacat - Dau Bus Terminal, Mabalacat, Pampanga
- Bataan
  - Balanga - Bataan City Terminal, Ibayo, Balanga, Bataan
- Zambales
  - Iba - Palanginan, Iba, Zambales
  - Olongapo - West Bajac-bajac, Olongapo
  - Santa Cruz - Poblacion North, Santa Cruz, Zambales
- Tarlac
  - Tarlac City - Zamora St, Tarlac City, Tarlac
- Nueva Ecija
  - San Jose - Pan-Philippine Highway, San Jose City, Nueva Ecija

Ilocos Region

- Pangasinan
  - Sison - Sison Bus Stop, Manila North Road, Sison, Pangasinan
  - Alaminos - Quezon Avenue, Poblacion, Alaminos, Pangasinan
  - Bolinao - Concordia, Bolinao, Pangasinan
  - Dagupan - Perez Boulevard, Herrero-Perez, Dagupan
  - Lingayen - Avenida Rizal East, Lingayen, Pangasinan

Cordillera Administrative Region

- Baguio
  - Baguio - Upper Session Road, Barangay Marcoville, Baguio
- Kalinga
  - Bulanao, Tabuk, Kalinga
  - Daguitan Street, Poblacion, Dagupan Weste, Tabuk, Kalinga

Cagayan Valley

- Nueva Vizcaya
  - Aritao - CCQ Bus Stop and Resto, Pan-Philippine Highway, Aritao, Nueva Vizcaya
- Isabela
  - Cauayan - Dy-Seven Gasoline Station, San Fermin, Cauayan, Isabela
  - Ilagan - Guinatan, Ilagan, Isabela
  - Roxas - Bantug, Roxas, Isabela
  - Santiago - Calao East, Santiago, Isabela
- Cagayan
  - Aparri - United Petron Station 2, Gen. Luna St., Macanaya District, Aparri, Cagayan
  - Tuao - Tuao Integrated Bus Terminal, Tuao, Cagayan
  - Tuguegarao - Maharlika Highway, Penge-Ruyu, Tuguegarao, Cagayan

Calabarzon

- Laguna
  - Calamba - Bicol Isarog Transport System Terminal, Barangay Turbina, Calamba, Laguna (for Baguio, Tuguegarao and Iba trips only)

== Subsidiaries ==
- Five Star Bus Company
- Bataan Transit
- First North Luzon Transit
- Luzon Cisco Transport
- Bicol Isarog Transport System
- German Espiritu Liner

== Gallery ==
Victory Liner buses

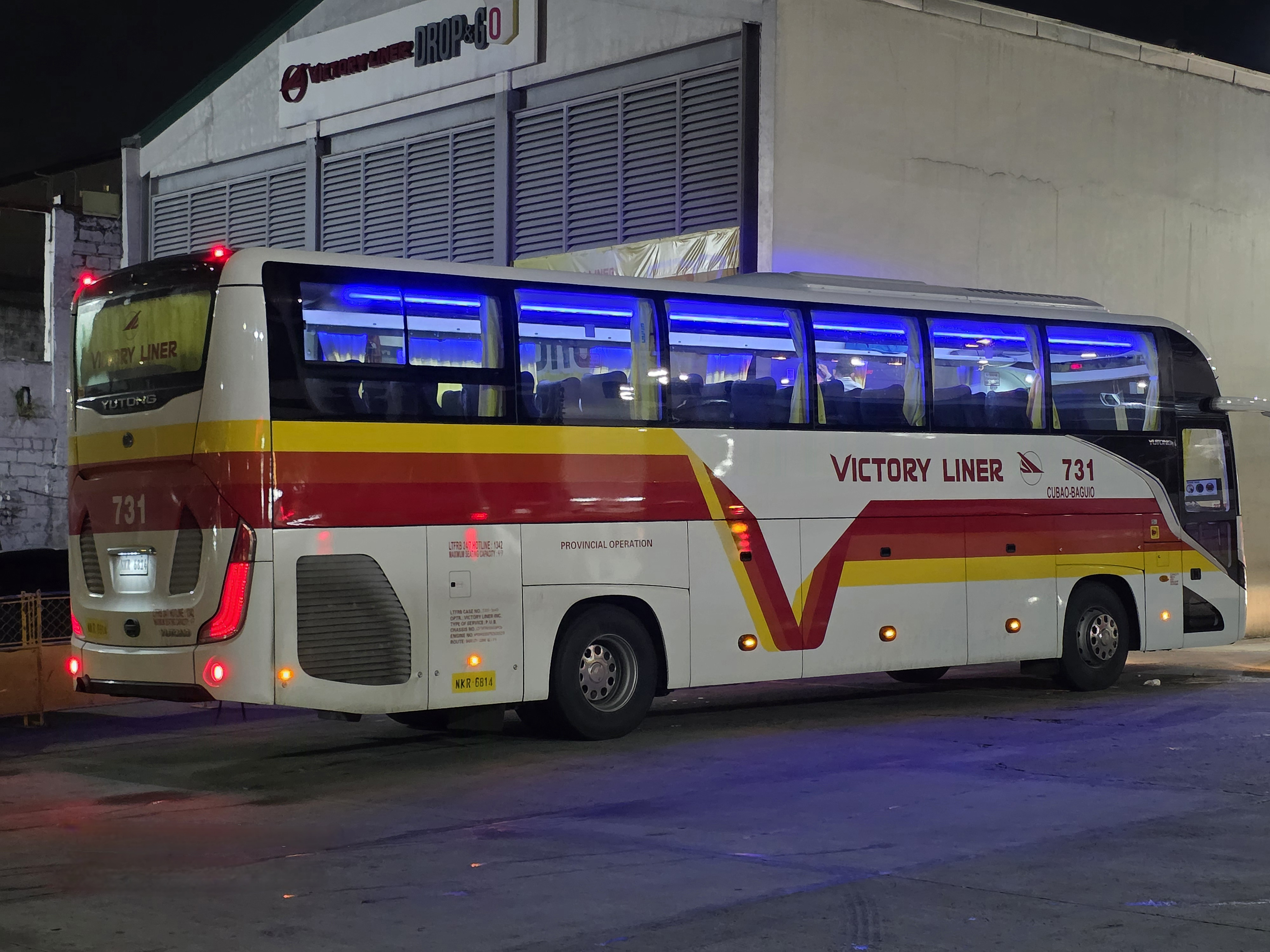
Yutong ZK6128H "C12PRO"

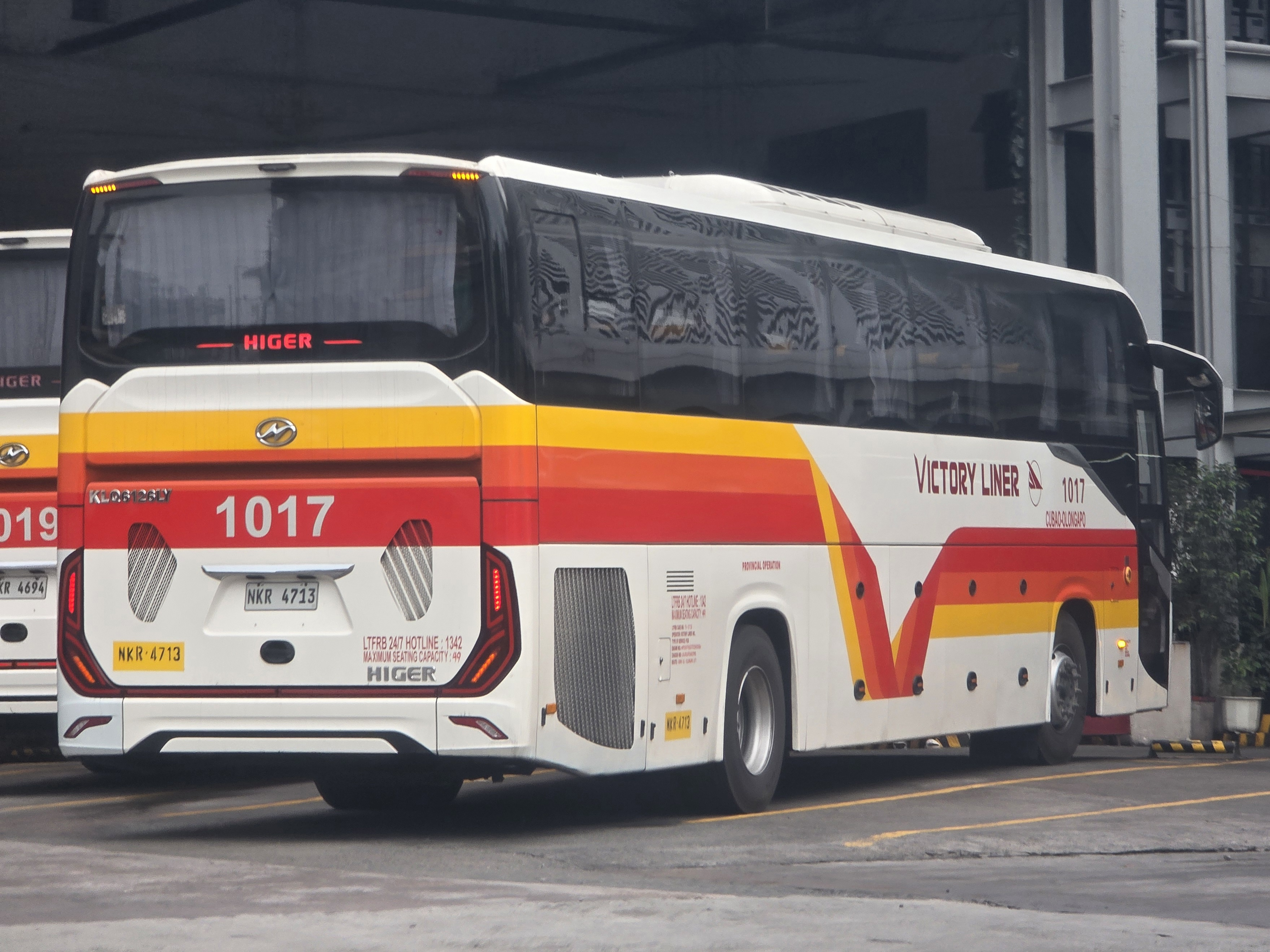
Higer V12 KLQ6126LY

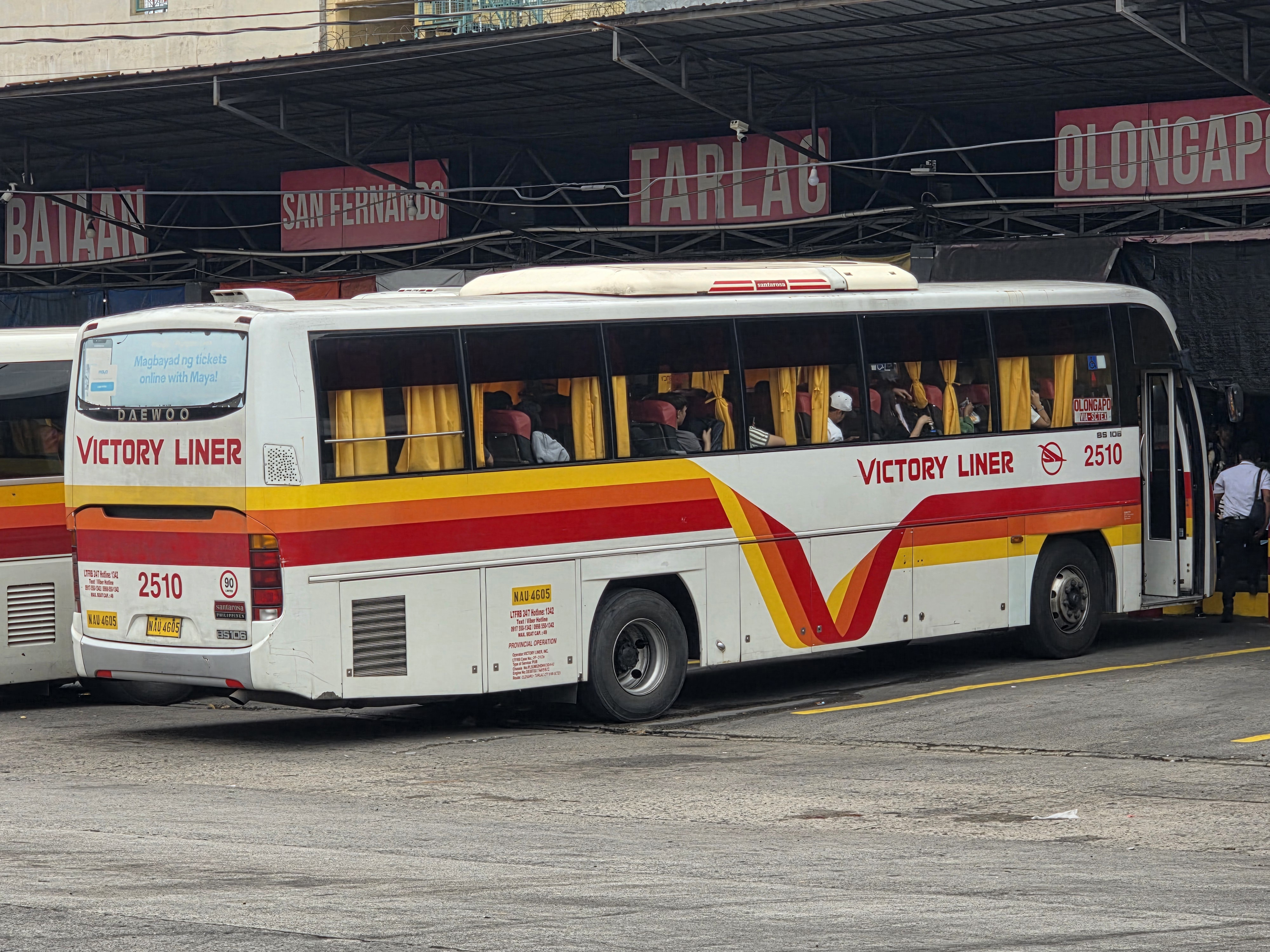
Daewoo BS106 (Santarosa Motorworks "Jetliner" body)

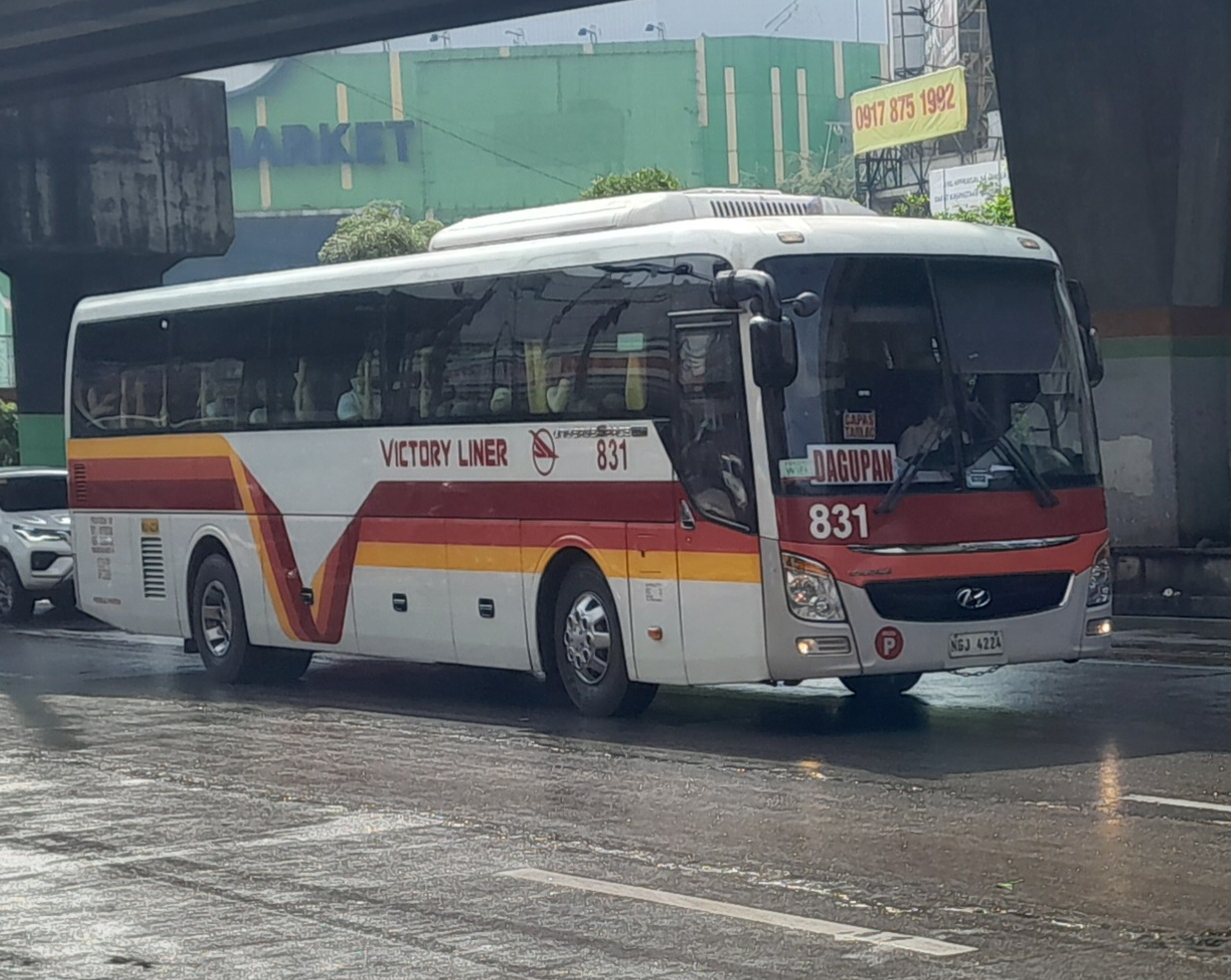
Hyundai Universe Space Luxury "Premium"

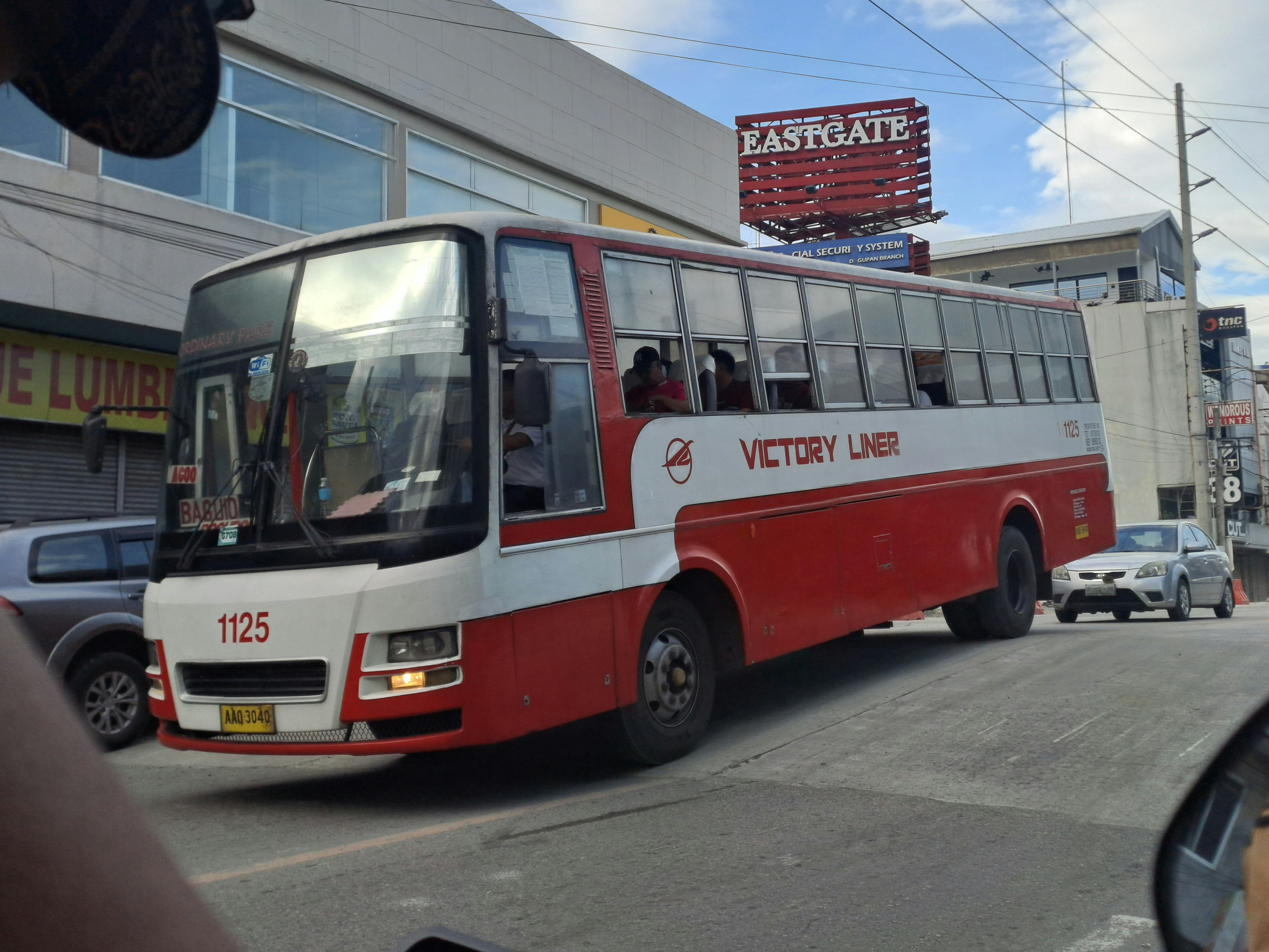
Nissan Diesel PKB212N (Santarosa Motorworks "Exfoh" body)

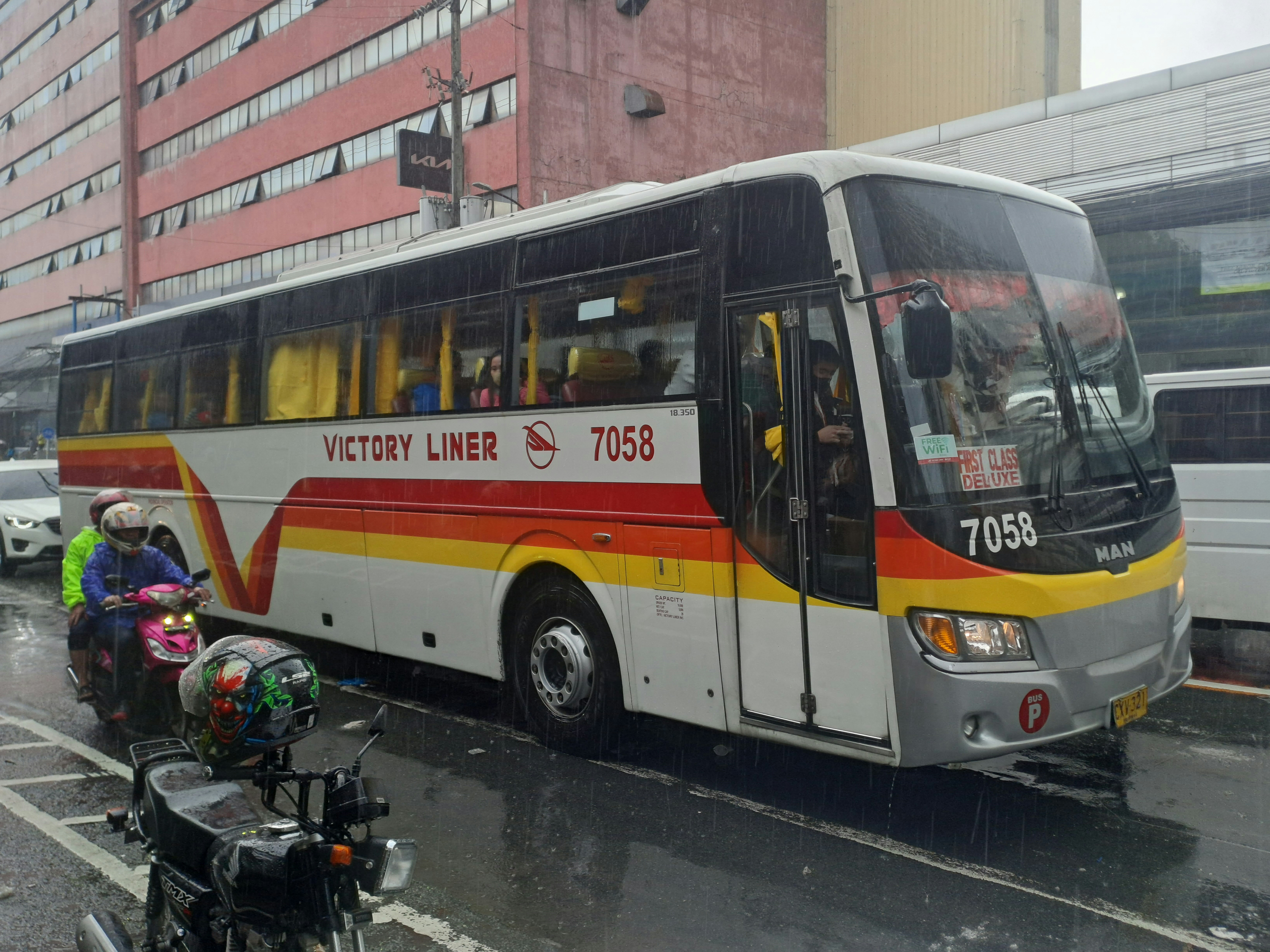
MAN R39 18.350 (Almazora Motors "Tourist Star Deluxe" body)

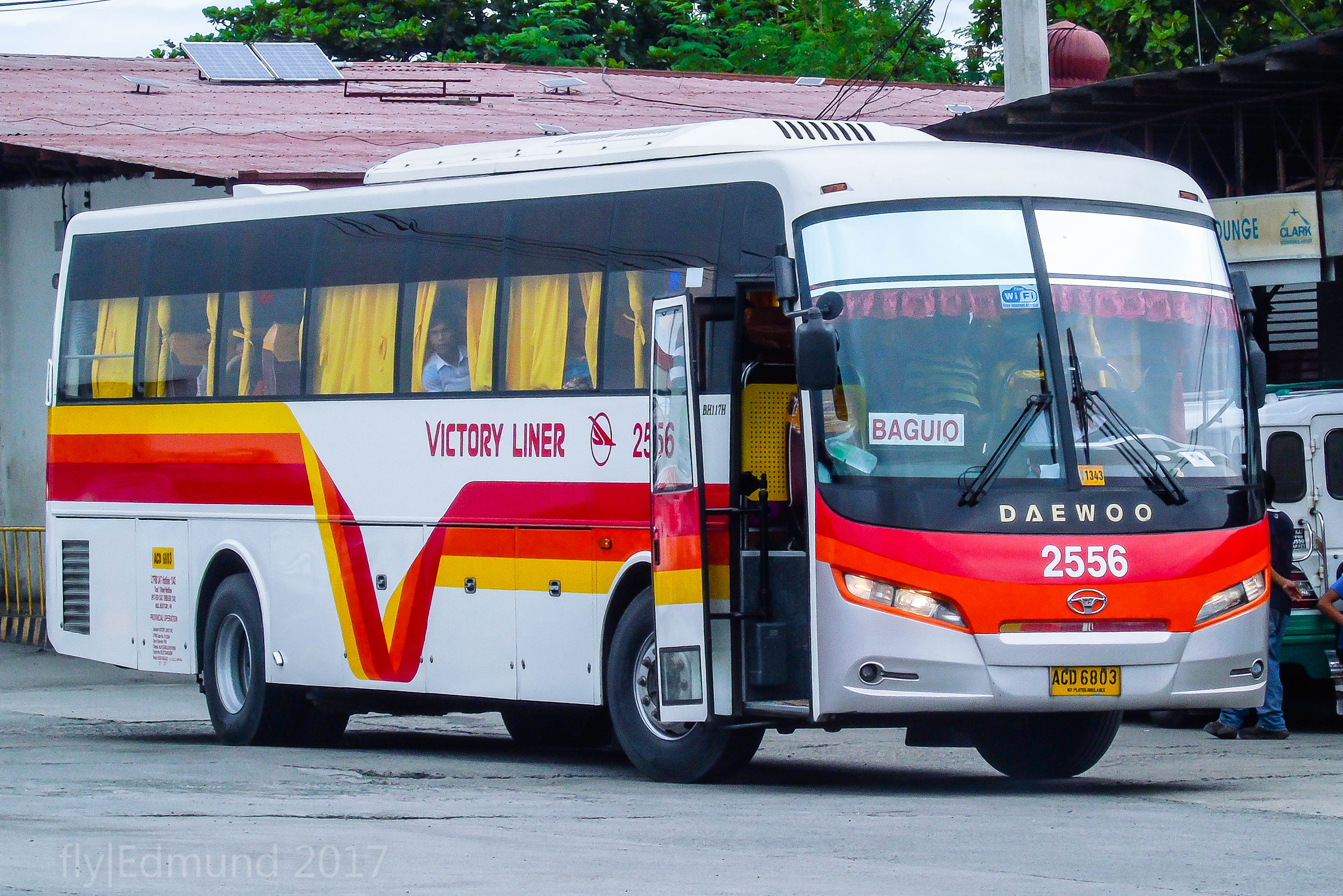
Daewoo BH117H (Santarosa Motorworks "Cityliner" body)

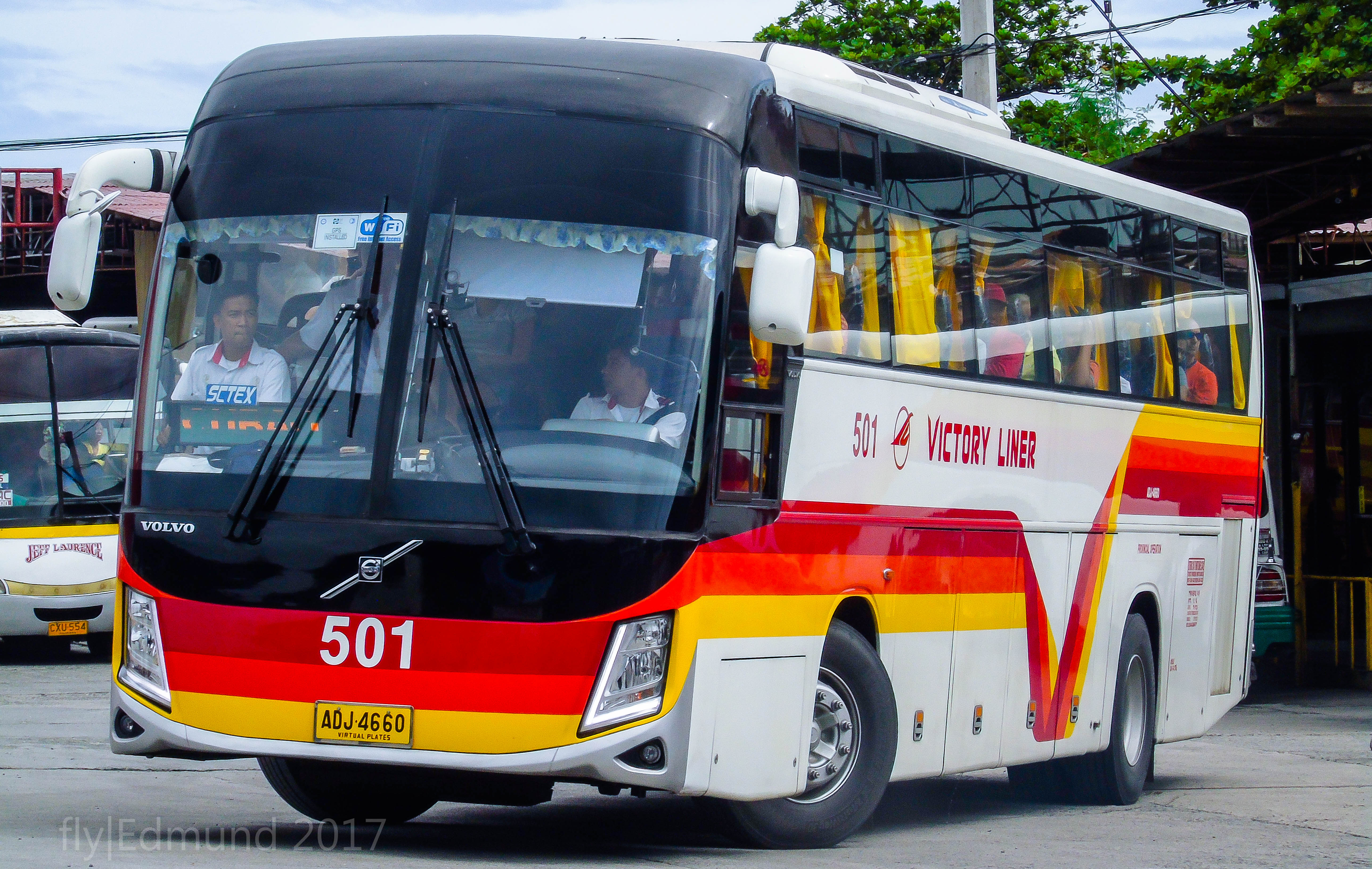
Volvo B7R (Del Monte Motor Works DM16 S2 body)

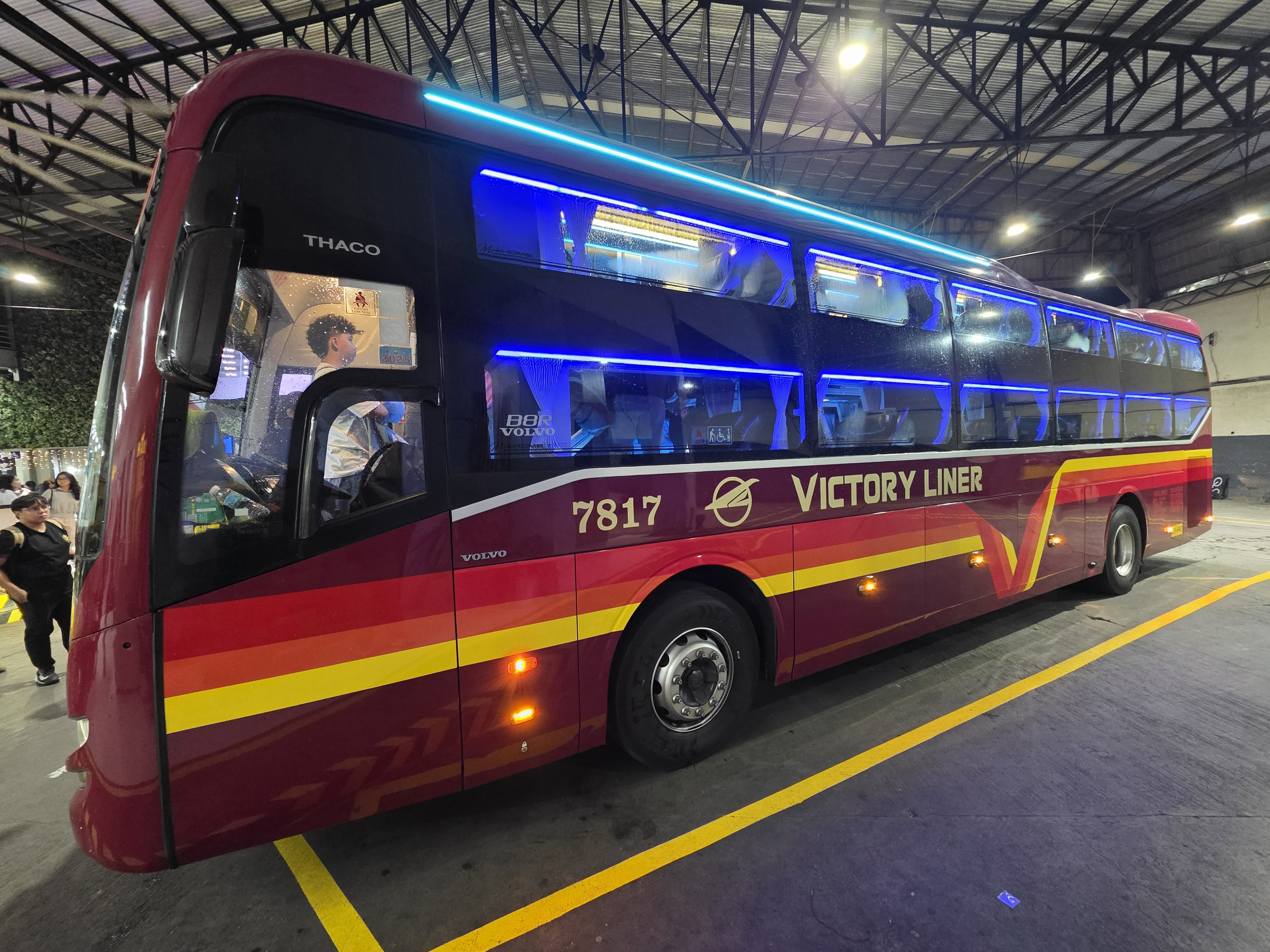
Volvo B8R (THACO Mobihome Limousine body)

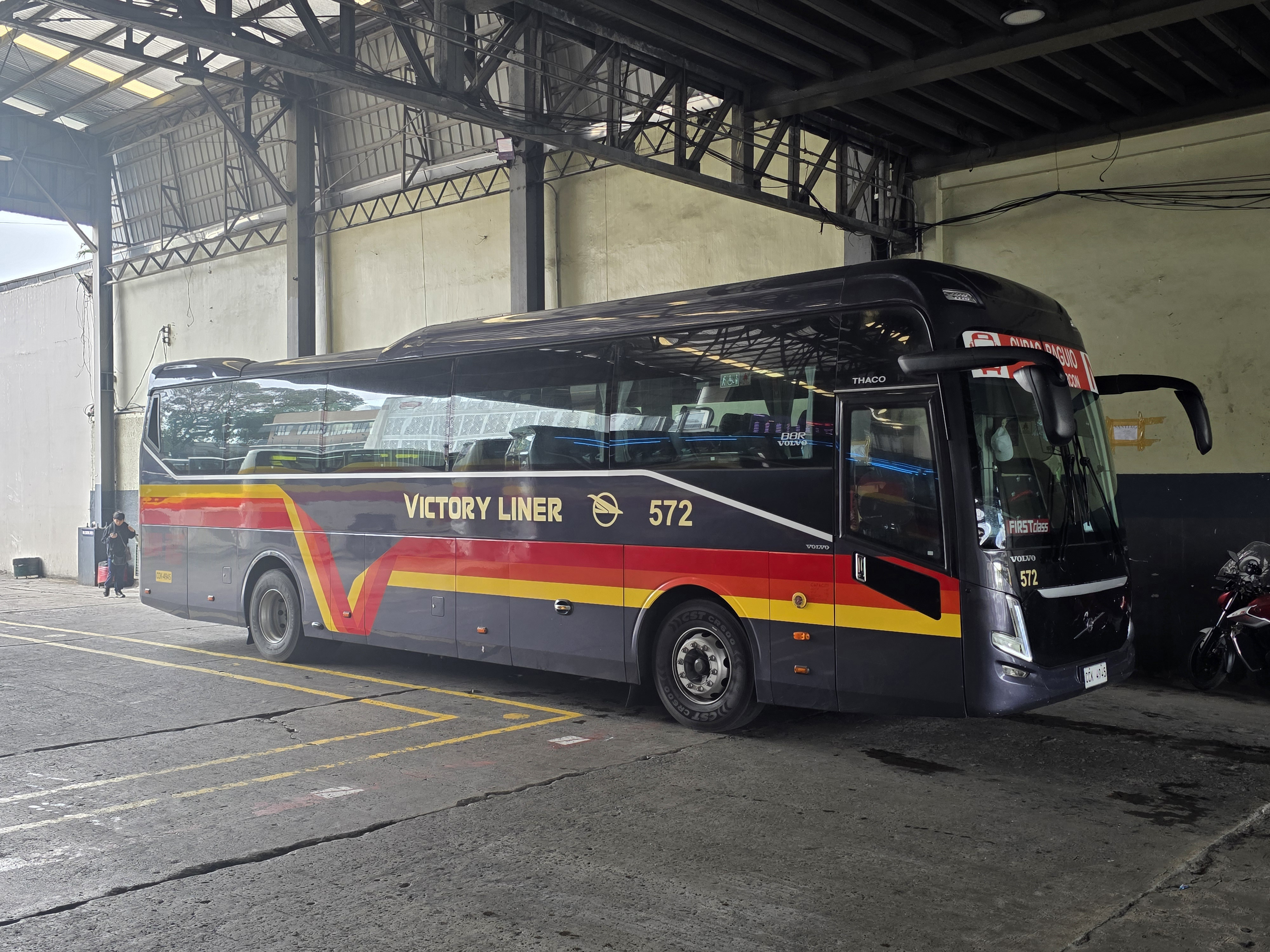
Volvo B8R (THACO Bluesky 120S body) "Chairman's Bus"

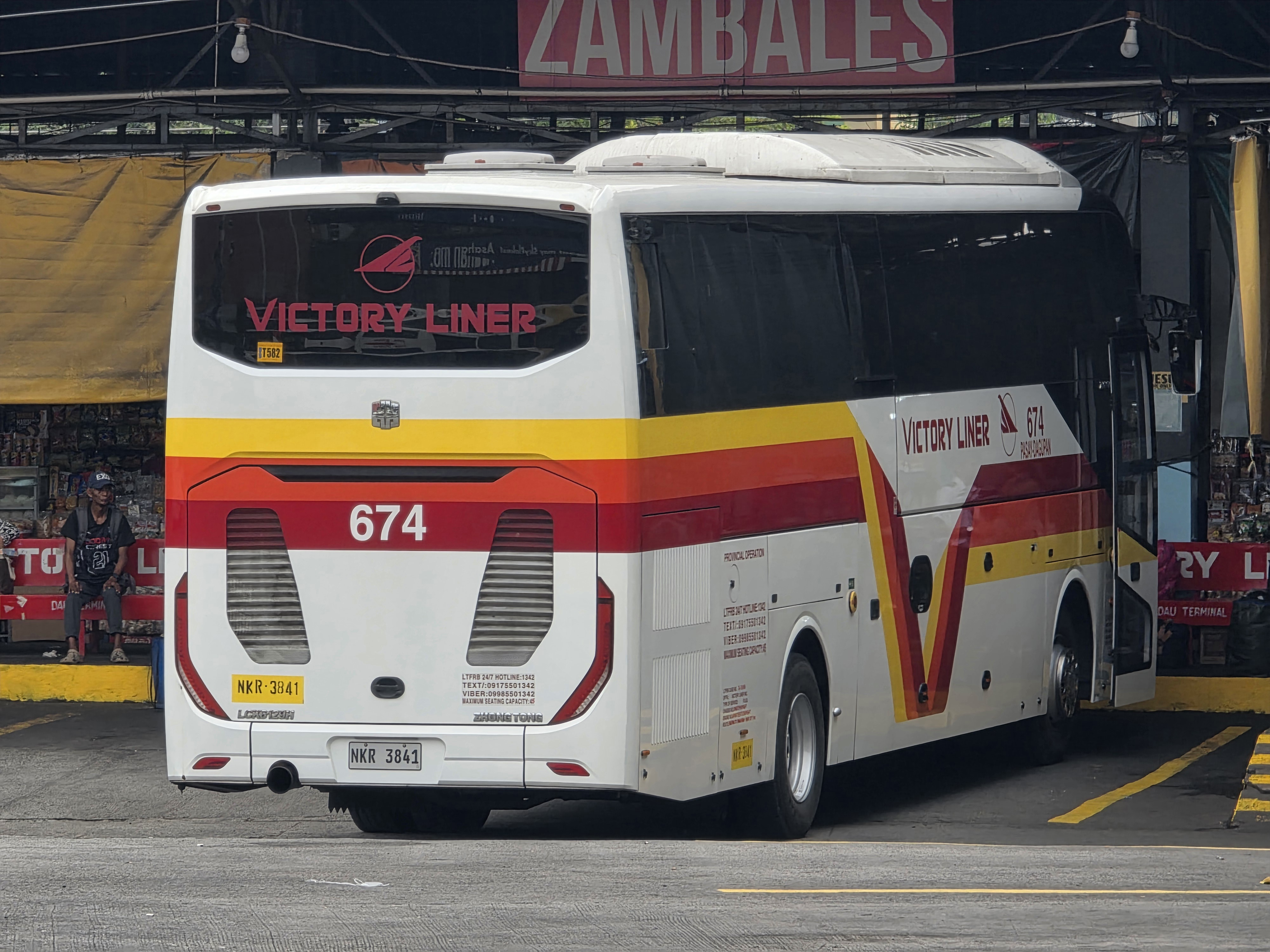
Zhongtong LCK6129H
