= 2014 Mountain Province bus accident =

Bus accident in Bontoc, Philippines

2014 Mountain Province Bus Accident
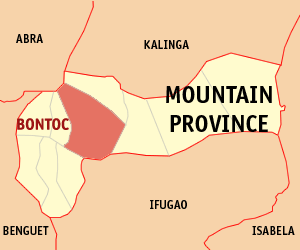
- Bontoc, Mountain Province the town where the accident occurred.

Details
- Date: February 7, 2014
- Location: Sitio Paggang, Talubin, Bontoc, Mountain Province, Philippines
- Country: Philippines
- Operator: GV Florida Transport

Statistics
- Deaths: 14, including Tado
- Injured: 32

The 2014 Mountain Province Bus accident was a bus accident that occurred when a GV Florida bus fell off a road in Sitio Paggang, Talubin, Bontoc, Mountain Province of the Philippines. The accident occurred on February 7, 2014. Fourteen people were killed and more than 32 people were injured. Comedian Tado and two more artists died in this accident.

== Accident ==
The accident occurred in Barangay Talubin, Bontoc, Mountain Province at around 7:20 am The bus was traveling on the Mountain Province when it fell 100 to 120 meters deep off the mountain.

As a result, 14 people were killed and 32 were left injured. Two foreigners, a Dutch and a Canadian national, were among the casualties. Visual artist Gerard Baja, musician David Sicam, and comedian Tado were also killed in the accident. Those who sustained injuries were brought to the Bontoc General Hospital. The driver was among those injured while the bus conductor was killed.

The passenger bus involved was a DMMC Aero Adamant with body no. 206 and is mounted on UD Nissan Diesel RB46S platform.

== Investigation ==
Mountain Province Senior Superintendent police chief Oliver Emmodias said mechanical problems and a defect in the vehicle could have been the cause of the accident.

== Aftermath ==
=== Sanctions ===
The Land Transportation Franchising Regulatory Board (LTFRB) imposed a 30-day preventive suspension to 186 of its franchised units on February 10, 2014. The Court of Appeals lifted the suspension in June 2014, citing grave abuse of discretion from the LTFRB, which found no "violations or willful and contumacious refusal to comply with the rules or regulations" but suspended the bus company anyway; on the same decision, the court affirmed the cancellation of certificates of public convenience to 10 other Florida buses.

=== Commemoration ===
On July 6, 2014, an artwork called "Every Bus is a Bus Full of Dreamers" was painted in front of the Sampaloc GV Florida Transport terminal.
