= DLTBCo =

Bus company in the Philippines

Del Monte Land Transport Bus Co.

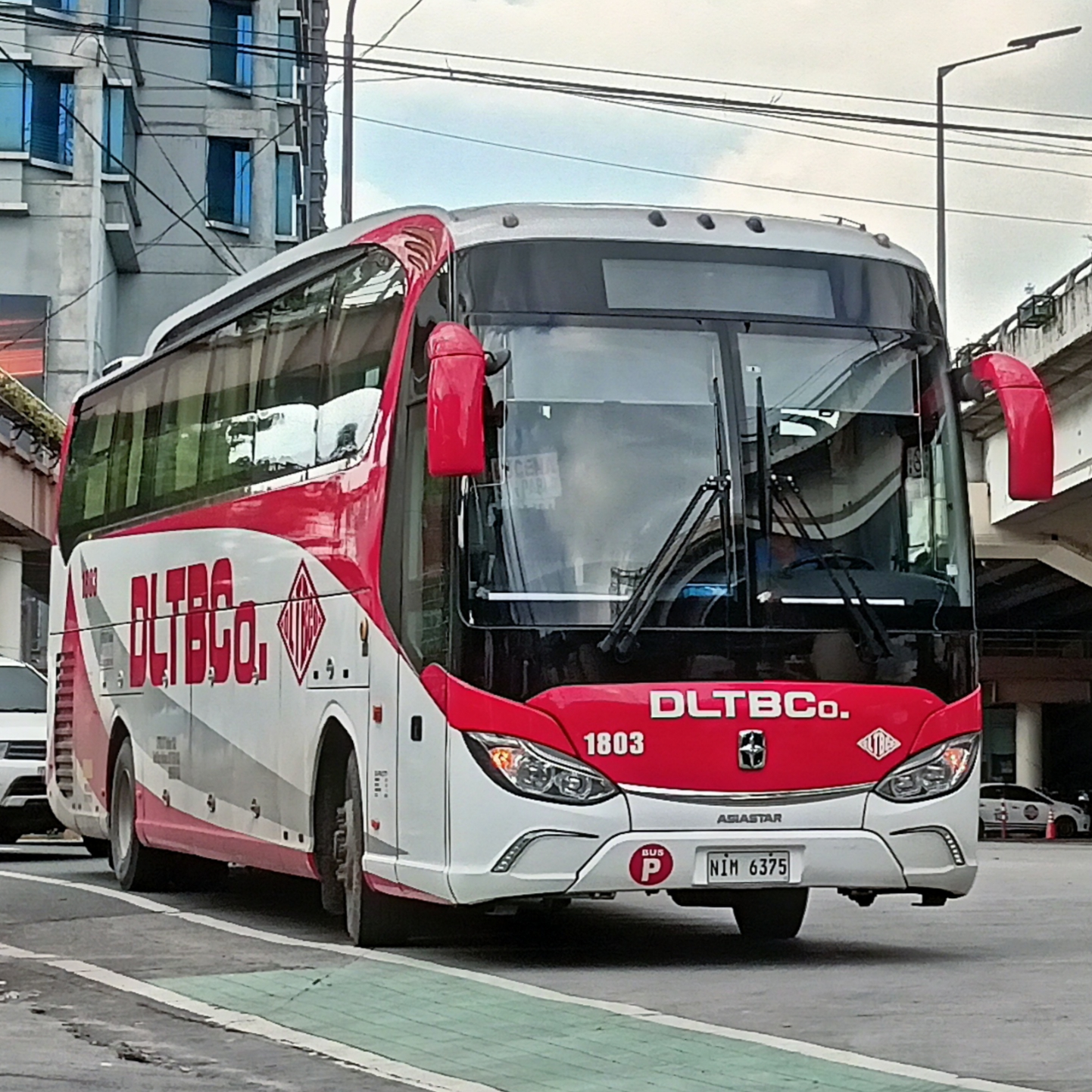
- DLTB Asiastar YBL6125H bus
- Founded: 1918; 108 years ago (as BTCo); 2009; 17 years ago (as DLTBCo)
- Ceased operation: 2004; 22 years ago (as BLTBCo)
- Headquarters: Turbina, Calamba, Laguna
- Locale: Southern Luzon; Eastern Visayas
- Service area: Metro Manila; Calabarzon; Bicol Region; Samar; Leyte
- Service type: Provincial Operation
- Fleet: 500+
- Operator: Del Monte Motor Works, Inc. (2009–present)
- Chief executive: Narciso Morales
- Website: www.dltb.ph

Del Monte Land Transport Bus Company (DLTBCo) is a provincial bus company formed as a subsidiary of Del Monte Motor Works, Incorporated. It was formed as a resurgent of Batangas Laguna Tayabas Bus Company Incorporated (BLTBCo.), one of the oldest provincial bus companies in the Philippines. It plies routes mainly to Southern Luzon provinces and other parts in Eastern Visayas region.

DLTBCo. was founded in 2009 when BLTBCo. was taken over by DMMW and later added to its investment, although one must take note that DLTBCo. and BLTBCo. are different companies from each other, but their similarity is its routes that the latter have. It was because the former has announced its restoration of the old routes made by the latter after the firm's take over. BLTBCo., on the other hand, was founded in 1918 shortly before the end of World War I. Thus, DLTBCo is one of the nation's oldest bus firms if the BTLBCo history and timeline are included.

== Etymology ==
The company was derived from the union of two small bus companies—BTCo. and LTB. BTCo. stands for Batangas Transportation Company, while LTB stands for Laguna Tayabas Bus Company. The union was made by Max Blouse, an American seargeant who fought in the Spanish–American War in 1898. After the war, he decided to stay in the Philippines.

== History ==
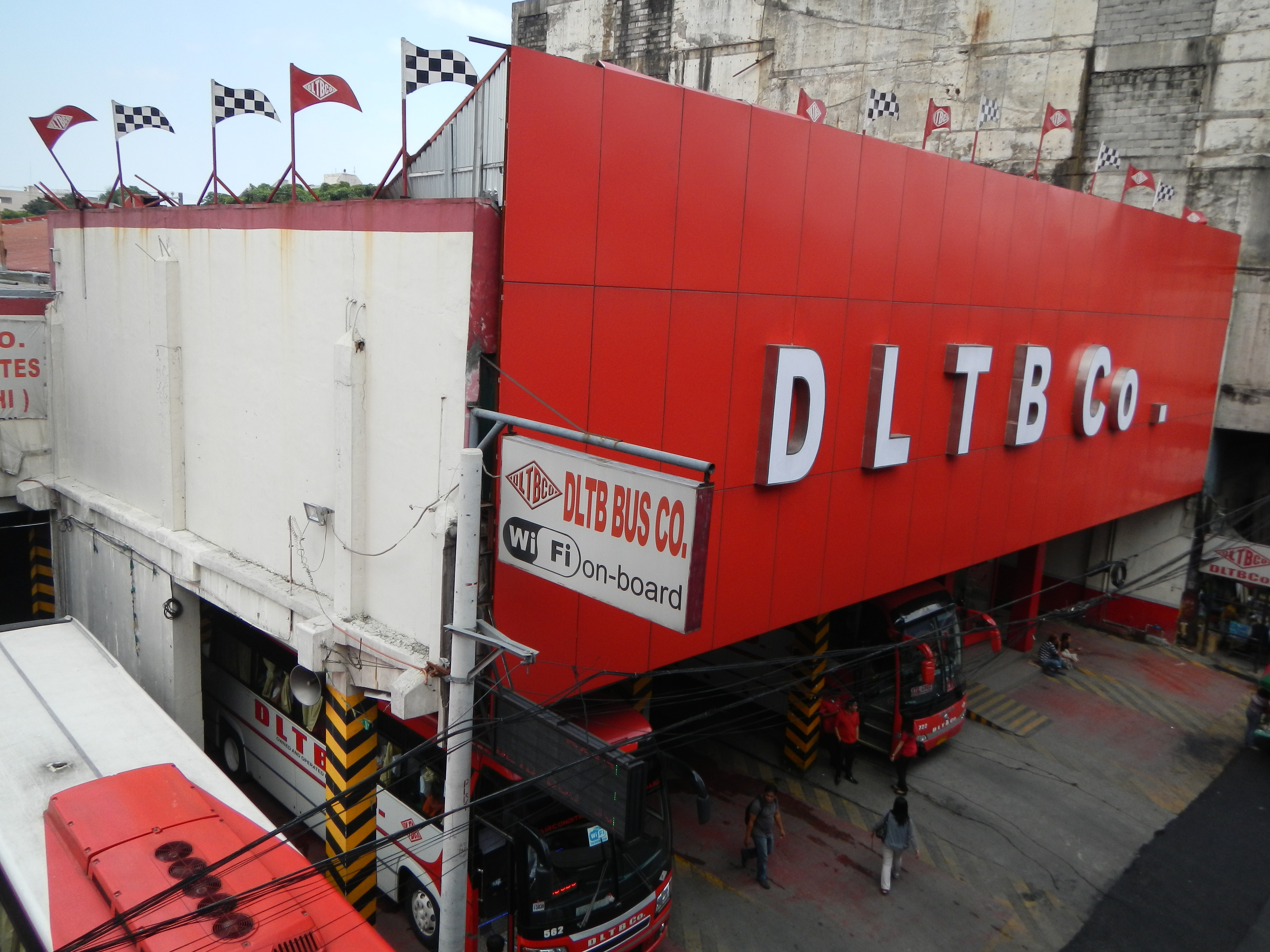
DLTBCo bus terminal, Taft Avenue, Pasay

=== 1918 ===
It was in 1918 when Max Blouse began his business ventures and founded the Batangas Transportation Company (BTCo). Starting with only one "calesa-like tires with wooden spokes" bus, Max Blouse performed the multiple tasks of being the driver, conductor and repairman for the whole operation. He eventually acquired 17 more units of the passenger vehicles painted in red that people fondly called "pula" - the basis of today's DLTBCo bus livery and Philippine Rabbit, its counterpart at Northern and Central Luzon.

=== 1928 ===
As a result of the thriving operation in the transportation business, Max Blouse in 1928 incorporated BTCo with his newly established bus company dubbed as Laguna Tayabas Bus Company (LTB), concentrating in the area of Laguna and Tayabas. The two enterprises he had installed apportioned a conspicuous achievement until the disruption of the Second World War.

The remnants of the war resulted in intense damage and decline of the company's business activities. All operations were closed, records were destroyed and most of the company-owned buildings were ravaged by the war. In spite of this, Max Blouse never lost his forbearance and intensified his effort to raise back the company's destroyed properties.

=== 1945 ===
Under a "Joint Emergency Operations" agreement on May 22, 1945, the two corporations proceeded its operation with 28 Chevrolet buses which Max Blouse acquired from the US army. He enabled a spectacular stride by bringing back the prosperity that the company savored prior to the war.

=== 1961–1964 ===
The death of Max Blouse on December 28, 1961 posted a challenge to Col. Pelagio G. Potenciano, a doctor by profession, who took the place of his father-in-law's designation as president. Albeit the fact the Colonel Potenciano did not have enough skills on the transportation business, he was bale to manage the two corporations well through his dedication and industry. It was during his administration where the BTCo and LTB finally merged into one company and was approved by the company's stockholder in 1964, thus, creating a new name termed as the Batangas Laguna Tayabas Bus Company (BLTBCo).

=== 1977–1988 ===
Colonel Potenciano's son, Max, became the president from 1977 to 1988.

In 1988 a new management approach was introduced by Dolores Alonso Potenciano, wife of Max B. Potenciano. When she assumed presidency, she re-structured BLTBCo. into a multi-million enterprise under all-Filipino management, whereas the company was originally founded by Max Blouse and his American associates.

During her presidency, Mrs. Potenciano adopted many changes across the company, guiding it through a period of substantial growth.

=== 1997–2009 ===
BLTBCo was under the management of its new chairman and chief executive officer Benjamin M. Bitanga, a business associate of the company. Taking over as president less than a year before, under Bitanga the company continued servicing the people from the southern part of Luzon, and areas within the provinces of Samar and Leyte.

However, in 2001, Potenciano family had their political ambitions in Laguna. With them spending much on it. They lost the elections. The company's problems continued with a series of lawsuits from their employees due to unfair labor practice and violation of the collective bargaining agreement (CBA). It was also the time when Bitanga and Potenciano clans had disputes over the management of the company.

In 2003, a fire erupted at Malibay that spread across their bus terminal. The fire destroyed many of their buses, as well as their repair garage. The company discontinued business for five years from 2004 to 2009.

=== 2009–present ===
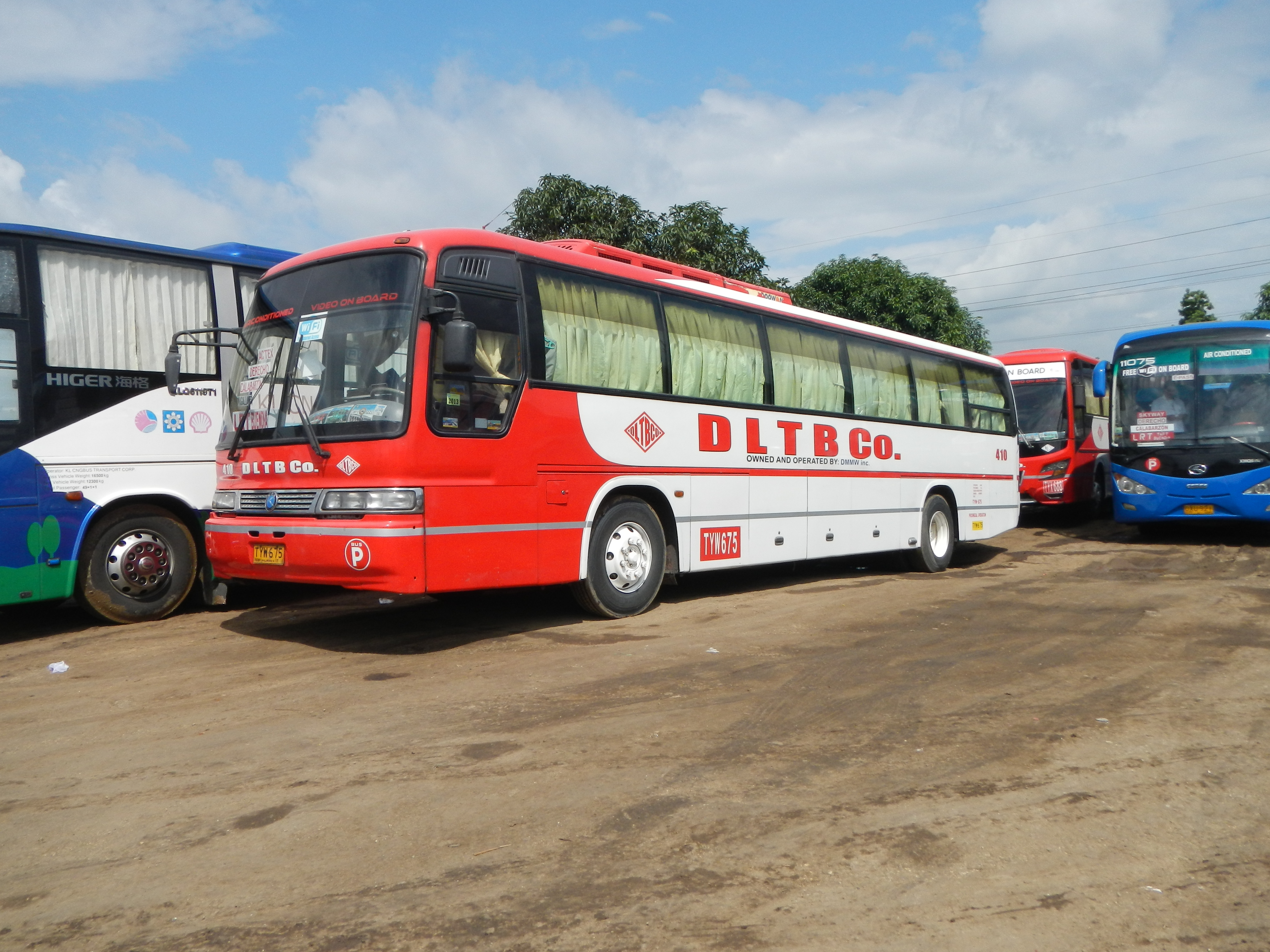
DLTBCo Kia Granbird

In 2009, following a five year suspension of operations and renovations, Del Monte Motor Works (DMMW), a bus and truck manufacturer based in Quezon City took over the management of BLTBCo. They renamed the company Del Monte Land Transport Bus Company (DLTBCo), and continued routes to Metro Manila via Laguna, Quezon, Batangas, Camarines Sur, Camarines Norte and Albay.

In 2010, DLTBCo resumed trips to Eastern Visayas, primarily in Northern Samar, Samar, Leyte and Southern Leyte. Under the new management, the company provided new bus units, and offered new services such as free Wi-Fi, and their "Greyhound Express Service".

In October 2024, DLTBCo launched their route between UP Diliman and UP Los Baños in partnership with University of the Philippines.

On October 28, 2025, DLTBCo announced to launched their point-to-point bus service mall-to-mall operation between SM Malls in Metro Manila and in Southern and Northern Luzon in partnership with Park-Solutions, Inc. (PSI) through a memorandum of agreement.

== Issues and criticisms ==
The issue on labor union in BLTBCo has caused up to pay for its damages filed by their employees. In 1973, during Martial Law, a group of private respondents, totaling 34 employees, led by bus conductors Librado Aquino and Eufemio Bondad, demanded the company for back wages and separation pay. These employees were detained by the military due to alleged involvement in the defraudation of the fund of the company. The management also refused to give them back pay. In the decision by the National Labor Relations Commission (NLRC), favoring the decision to the complainants, the management forced to give separation pay to the employees.

Consecutive strikes led by labor union leaders of the company were able to file cases against the management due to unfair labor practice and violation of the collective bargaining agreement (CBA). BLTBCo management forced to pay those employees who led the strike in two consecutive years.

The bankruptcy of BLTBCo was caused by the involvement of one member of Potenciano family to run for governor in Laguna, but failed to win in the 2001 local elections. This time, the labor union filed a class suit against the management. By then, BLTBCo has again, a troubled history when the Potenciano clan strongly refused to give up the bus company to its investors. As a result, the company was totally crippled by financial losses and mismanagement for six years. The Bitanga and Potenciano clans have disputes on the management of the company.

== Fleet ==
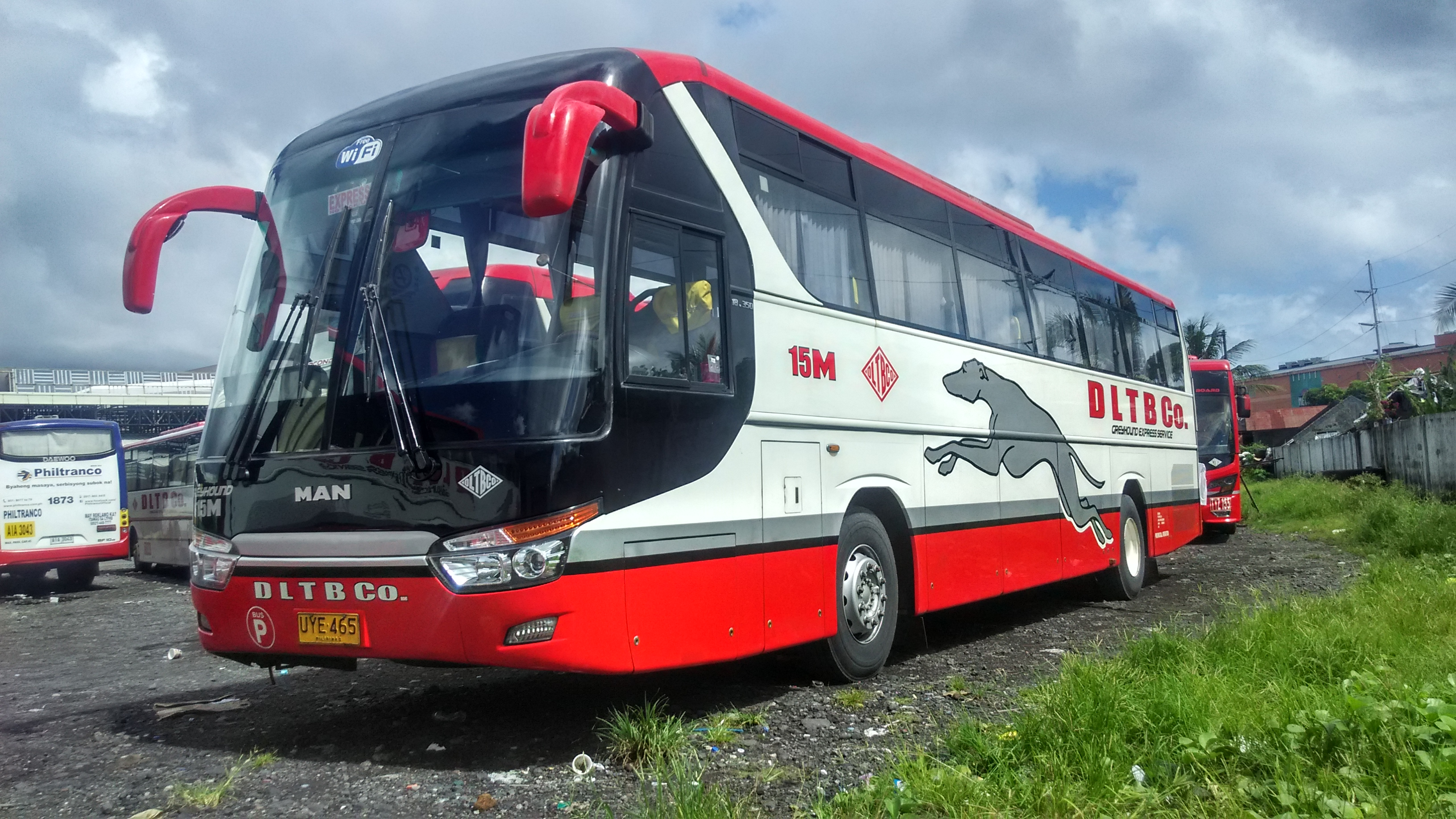
A DLTBCo 15M at the Legazpi Grand Central Terminal, A DM14

BLTB Co has maintained MAN, Hino, UD Nissan Diesel, Mercedes-Benz, Isuzu, and Mitsubishi Fuso units from the time of re-fleeting between 1988 and 2001. All of its buses were already defunct, while others were destroyed in a 2003 fire in Malibay.

When Del Monte Motor Works, Inc. took over the management in 2009, their coachbuilding division provided additional bus units. With those units manufactured by Del Monte such as the DM10, DM11, DM12, and DM14s, the company has maintained most of the old routes and presently they have Ashok Leyland, Hino, Hyundai, MAN, Kia, King Long and Yutong units.

Here are their fleets as of May 2023:

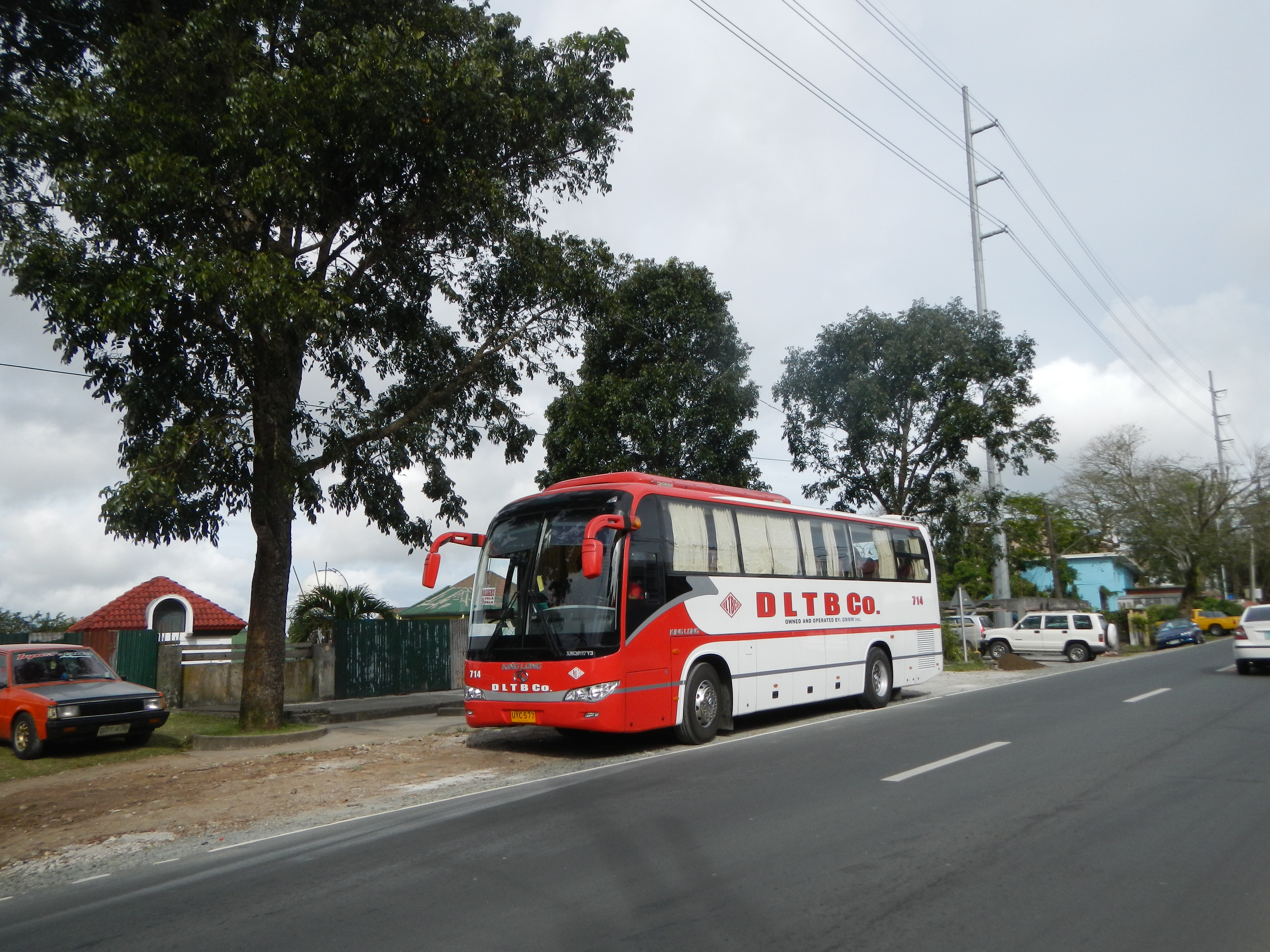
A King Long XMQ6117Y unit of DLTBCo in Batangas

DLTBCo Fleet
CBU / Complete Buses
Make	Model	Series	Notes
Hyundai Universe	Space Luxury	100	
King Long	XMQ6117Y	700	
King Long	XMQ6101Y	700	2nd batch
King Long	XMQ6129Y2	800	Greyhound units
Yutong	ZK6107HA	1200	
Yutong	ZK6122HD9	1400	
Ankai	A6 HFF6119KDE5B	1500	
Ankai	A8 HFF6121K09D1E51	1600	
Asiastar	YBL6125H	1800	

Coaches locally built by Del Monte Motor Works, Inc
Body	Chassis	Series	Notes
DMMC DM10	Hino RK1J-ST		ongoing rebodied into DM16 S2
DMMC DM10	Hino RK1J-MT	500	ongoing rebodied into DM16 S2
DMMC DM10	Hyundai Aero Space LS	200 series	ongoing rebodied into DM16 S2
DMMC DM11	Hino RK1J-ST		
DMMC DM11	Hino RK1J-MT		
DMMC DM11	Hyundai Aero Space LS	200, 900	900 series for Ordinary fleets
DMMC DM12 Series 1	Hino RK1J-ST		
DMMC DM12 Series 1	Hino RM2P-SS		
DMMC DM12 Series 1	Hyundai Aero Space LS		
DMMC DM12 Series 1	MAN R39 18.350 HOCL	1100	some rebodied to DM18 Series 1
DMMC DM12 Series 2	Hyundai Aero Space LS		
DMMC DM14 Series 1	MAN R39 18.350 HOCL		
DMMW DM14 Series 2	Hino RK1J-ST	2100, 5100	
DMMW DM14 Series 2	Hyundai Aero Space LS	2100, 5100	
DMMW DM16 Series 2	Hino RK1J-ST		rebodied fleet
DMMW DM16 Series 2	Hino RM2P-SS		rebodied fleet
DMMW DM16 Series 2	Hyundai Aero Space LS		rebodied fleet
DMMW DM16 Series 2	Volvo B8R	1700	
DMMW DM18 Series 1	MAN R39 18.350 HOCL		rebodied fleet

Former Fleet

- Ashok Leyland Viking BS3 (600 series, 2013–2019)
- Hyundai Aero Space LS (300 series, Korean Surplus, 2010–2015)
- Kia Granbird (400 series, Korean Surplus, 2010–2015)

== Terminals ==
- Taft Avenue, Pasay
- EDSA, Pasay
- EDSA Cubao, Quezon City
- Araneta City Bus Port, Cubao, Quezon City
- EDSA Timog, Quezon City
- Pedro Guevarra Avenue, Santa Cruz, Laguna
- Santa Rosa Integrated Terminal, Santa Rosa, Laguna in front of SM City Santa Rosa
- Calaca-Lemery Highway, Lemery, Batangas
- J.P. Laurel Highway, SM City Lipa Grand Terminal, Lipa, Batangas
- J.P. Laurel Street, Nasugbu, Batangas
- Talipan, Pagbilao, Quezon
- Maharlika Highway, Daet, Camarines Norte
- Legazpi City Grand Terminal, Legazpi Port District, Legazpi, Albay
- Parañaque Integrated Terminal Exchange, Parañaque
- Luisiana Park, Luisiana, Laguna
- Lucban Plaza, Lucban, Quezon
- Sampaloc Street, Sampaloc, Quezon

== See also ==
- List of bus companies of the Philippines
