= GV Florida Transport =

Bus company in the Philippines

GV Florida Transport Inc.
- Formerly: Florida Liner
- Founded: 1971; 55 years ago
- Headquarters: Matucay, Allacapan, Cagayan, Philippines
- Locale: Luzon
- Service area: Metro Manila; Tarlac; Cagayan Valley; Cordillera Administrative Region; Ilocos Region
- Service type: Provincial Operation
- Alliance: Florida North Trans O.P.C.; Transport Pro Services, Inc.
- Routes: Cagayan; Isabela; Ilocos Norte; Ilocos Sur; Quirino; Nueva Vizcaya; Baguio; Apayao; Ifugao
- Depots: Sampaloc, Manila; E. Rodriguez, Cubao, Quezon City; Pura, Tarlac; Tuguegarao, Cagayan; Allacapan, Cagayan; Laoag, Ilocos Norte
- Fleet: Hino; Scania; Zhongtong; Higer; MAN; Hyundai
- Operator: G.V. Florida Transport, Inc. (1999–present)
- Key people: George U. Florida; Virgilio U. Florida Jr. (also known as Jun Florida)
- Website: https://www.gvfloridatrans.com/

G.V. Florida Transport, Incorporated (formerly Florida Liner), is a Philippine bus transportation company based in Barangay Matucay, Allacapan, Cagayan. Established in the 1970s by Virgilio Florida Sr., the company operates buses serving destinations in Northern Luzon. The company is currently managed by Mr. Virgilio Florida Jr.

GV Florida Transport was the first bus company in the Philippines to introduce sleeper buses for long-distance travels.

== History ==
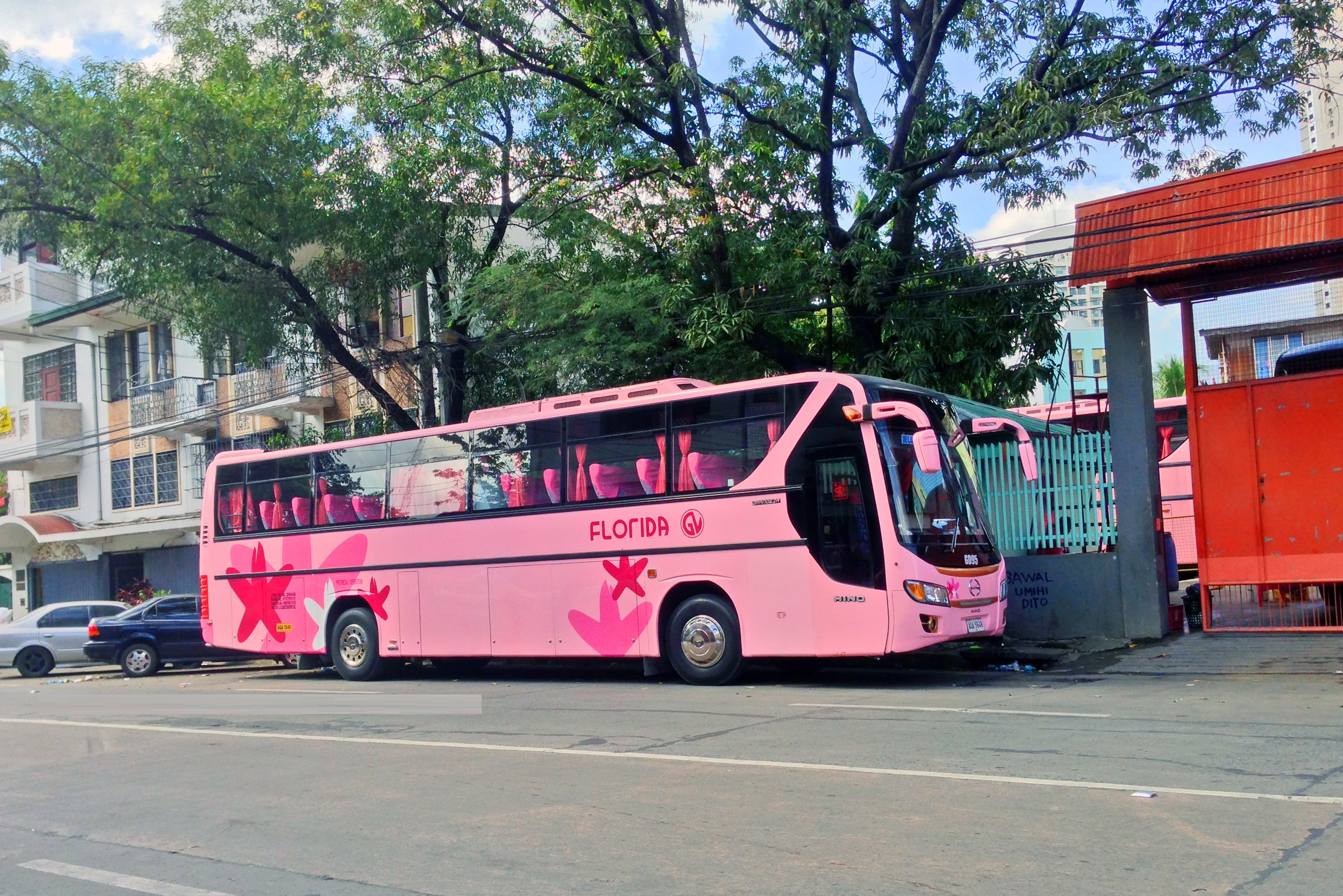
A GV Florida bus, while parked on its motorpool in Sampaloc, Manila.

GV Florida Transport, Inc., founded in 1999 by Virgilio Florida and his son George Florida and Virgilio Florida Jr., is a popular bus company in Cagayan, Ilocos and Quirino provinces. The company offers comfortable and stylish travel experiences with its distinctive flowery pink livery on its buses. Equipped with amenities like reclining seats, air conditioning, and onboard entertainment systems, it ferries goods and passengers from Metro Manila to the Cagayan Valley Region and Ilocos Region, as well as inter-provincial routes.

=== Early expansion and Growth ===
G.V. Florida Transport expanded its transportation industry presence by acquiring franchises from various bus companies, including F. Franco Transit, B. Trans, Autobus Transportation, Viva Alladin, Ballesteros Bus Line, and Dagupan Bus Company's Cagayan line. The expansion enhanced the service offerings and positioned G.V. Florida Transport as a key player in the sector, offering convenient and reliable travel options for passengers in Cordillera (with the acquisition of Autobus' remaining routes), Ilocos, Cagayan Valley, and Isabela regions.

In early 2000's, G.V. Florida Transport is the first Philippine bus company to introduce the "Sleeper Class" with Golden Dragon, Higer, and Hino RM sleeper buses servicing Manila-Cagayan and Manila-Ilocos routes. Meanwhile, a sister company as well as a subsidiary, GMW Florida Trans Inc. (GMW TRANS.), is operated by the other siblings of George and serves Santiago-Cauayan-Tuguegarao-Laoag, Tuguegarao-Baguio via San Jose, Nueva Ecija, Bayombong, and Tuguegarao–Abra via Bantay/Vigan routes.

=== 2011: Expansion and Modernization ===
In 2011, GV Florida Transport expanded its fleet by purchasing six units of MAN R39 18.350 for its Super Deluxe fleet and 20 Exclusively Modified PHI Grandeza RM for its Deluxe and Super Deluxe fleets. In 2013, they acquired the DM14 Series with Hino RM chassis for their Deluxe and Super Deluxe fleets.

=== 2014: The "Dark Year" of GV Florida ===
On the early morning of February 7, 2014, GV Florida experienced one of its darkest years in its history when one of its bus fell into a ravine in Sitio Pagang, Barangay Talubin in Bontoc. It was carrying 45 people on board. Fourteen people were killed, including one Dutch and one Canadian national, and Filipino comedian & actor Tado Jimenez. The accident occurred due to brake failure, causing the bus to lose control and veer off the road. Rescue teams were immediately dispatched to the scene to provide medical assistance and transport the injured survivors to nearby hospitals for treatment.

The Land Transportation Franchising Regulatory Board (LTFRB) imposed a 30-day preventive suspension on all of the company's 186 bus units on February 10, 2014, three days after the incident. The incident referred to was a fatal bus accident that resulted in multiple casualties. Later the LTFRB's decided to suspend all of the remaining company's bus units to ensure a thorough investigation and assessment of the company's safety protocols and compliance with regulations.

=== Recovery, further expansion and contemporary history ===
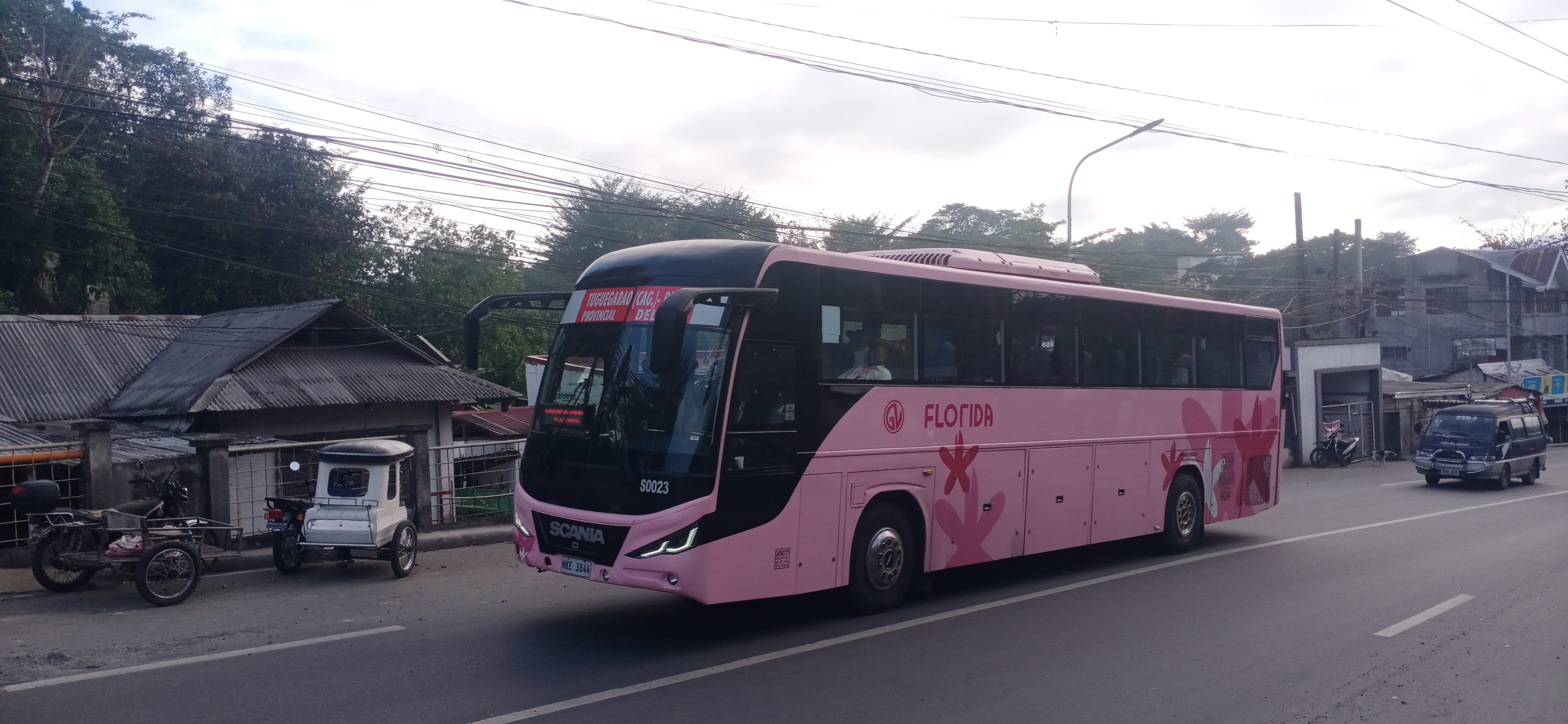
A GV Florida Scania Executive DeLuxe arriving in Tuguegarao City.

After the Supreme Court lifted its suspension, GV Florida returned to service. In anticipation of demands of travelling market, GV Florida Transport continues to expand further its fleet with the acquisition of newer and modern bus units such as Higer U-Tour Series, additional batches of Hino RM2PSS platform showcasing modern bus body design such as Hino Grandecho II Series by Hino Motors Philippines Inc. and DM16 Series 1 by Del Monte Motor Works, Inc.

It also paved way in acquisition and/or launching various companies starting the introduction of its subsidiary, Transport Pro Services Inc. (from the remnants of B. Trans and F. Franco) which serves the Ilocos Region. Also, GV Florida strengthened its presence in the inter-provincial routes especially in Cordillera Region with the absorption of St. Joseph Express, Gabriel Trans and later, Dangwa Transport, along with GMW Trans, to its group of companies. Unlike previous company acquisitions, these five companies continue to operate alongside the parent company, GV Florida as separate brands.

In addition, GV Florida Transport has also introduced Zhongtong Bus to its fleet with custom bodies made by Pura Bus, an in-house body building of GV Florida Transport.

In 2019, GV Florida added the Hino RN8J in its fleet utilizing the new Hino Grandeza II and Del Monte Motorworks' DM16 series 1 body. On the 4th Quarter of 2023 and early 2024, as part of its major re-fleeting program, GV Florida Transport formally launched the "Executive Class", an upgraded Super Deluxe and Sleeper service, together with another expansion of its bus fleet with the introduction of Scania K series platform and the bus body is built by Del Monte Motorworks, and later its in-house bodybuilder, Pura Bus, utilizing the DM22T, DM23 and DM24 bus body. GV Florida also revived the "Executive Deluxe" with the introduction of Higer KLQ6127LA "Tourist" and Higer KLQ6126LY "Higer V12" in its fleet, that later spawned new bus model developed by Pura Bus and was based from Higer V12 as its core design.

On June 10, 2025, DOTr suspends 15 bus units covering the routes Sta. Ana–Sampaloc and Baguio–Apayao for 30 days, following the viral video bus allegedly caught in the act racing with each other in the area of Nueva Vizcaya, which was uploaded on June 8. Following the suspension, DOTr decided that three drivers revoked their licenses.

In 2026, all of its interprovincial subsidiaries, GMW Trans, St. Joseph and Gabriel Trans were consolidated into one company, the Florida North Trans O.P.C.

== Fare class ==
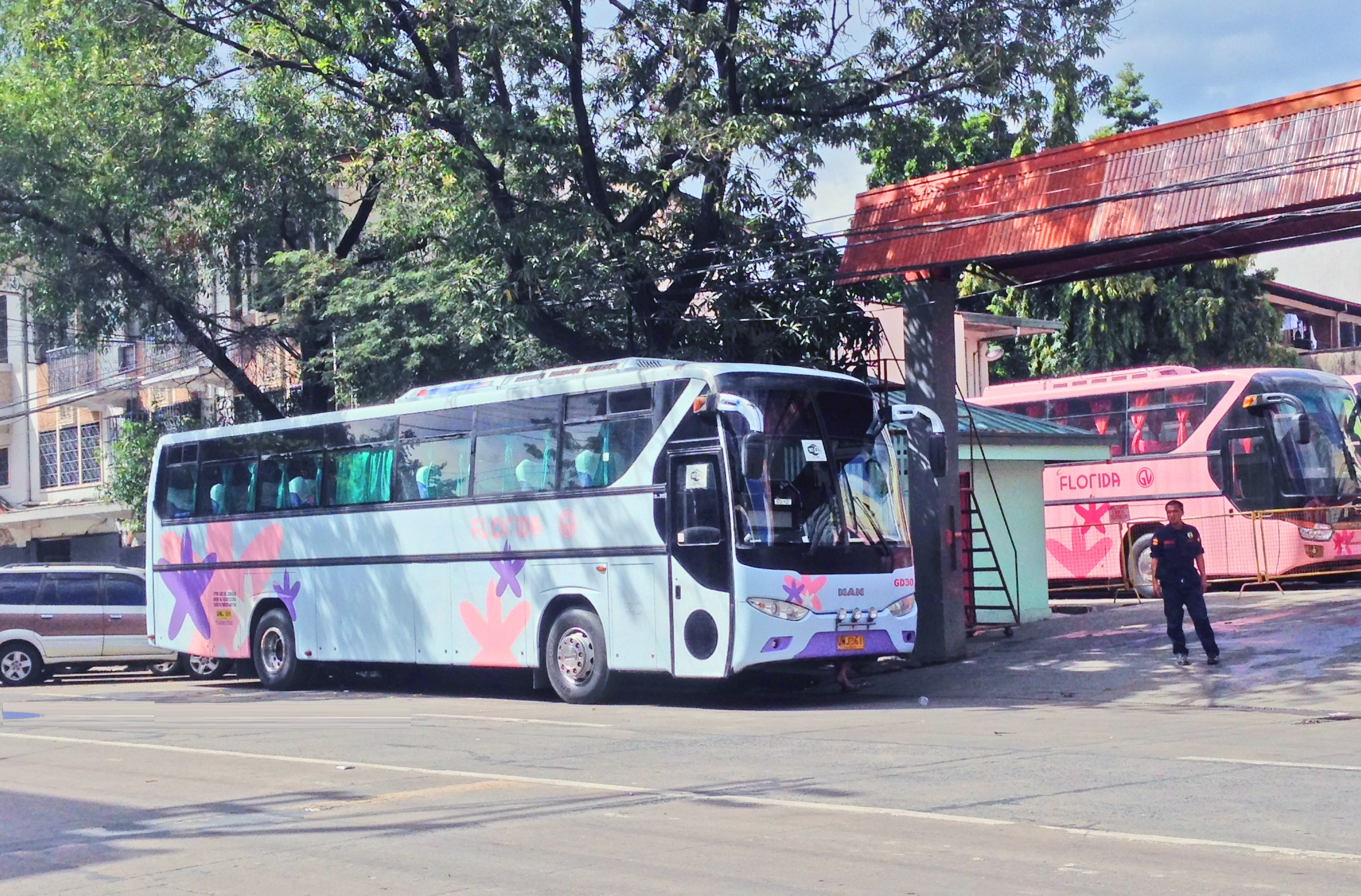
A GV Florida Super Deluxe unit. A DMMWI XML6127 inspired body in MAN R39 18.350 platform.

G.V. Florida has employed various types of fare classes across its fleet:

=== Regular Class ===
- Regular Fare: Seats up to 49 passengers in 4-abreast (2–2) seating layout. (This fare class is rarely seen on the road, as it has largey been superseded by the Deluxe Class)
- Deluxe: Seats up to 43 passengers in 4-abreast (2–2) seating layout, 2 LCD TV. It is similar to Regular Fare but includes the addition of an on-board toilet. This is the most common fare class among the fleet.
- Super Deluxe: 28 passengers in a spacious 3-abreast (1–2) seating layout, 2 LCD TV, it also features an on board restroom for added passengers convenience.
- "Regular" Sleeper: Up to 35 reclining double-deck bunk beds in 3-abreast (1–1–1) layout, 4 TVs, with onboard restroom.The first company to introduce Sleeper bus in the Philippines.

The company previously operated ordinary-fare buses until the mid-2010s. These units were initially painted yellow and later transferred to its subsidiary, Dagupan Bus. The ordinay-fare services was eventually phased out and replaced by regular-fare buses, followed later by deluxe-class units. These buses were non-airconditioned and could seat up to 55 passengers.

=== Executive Class ===
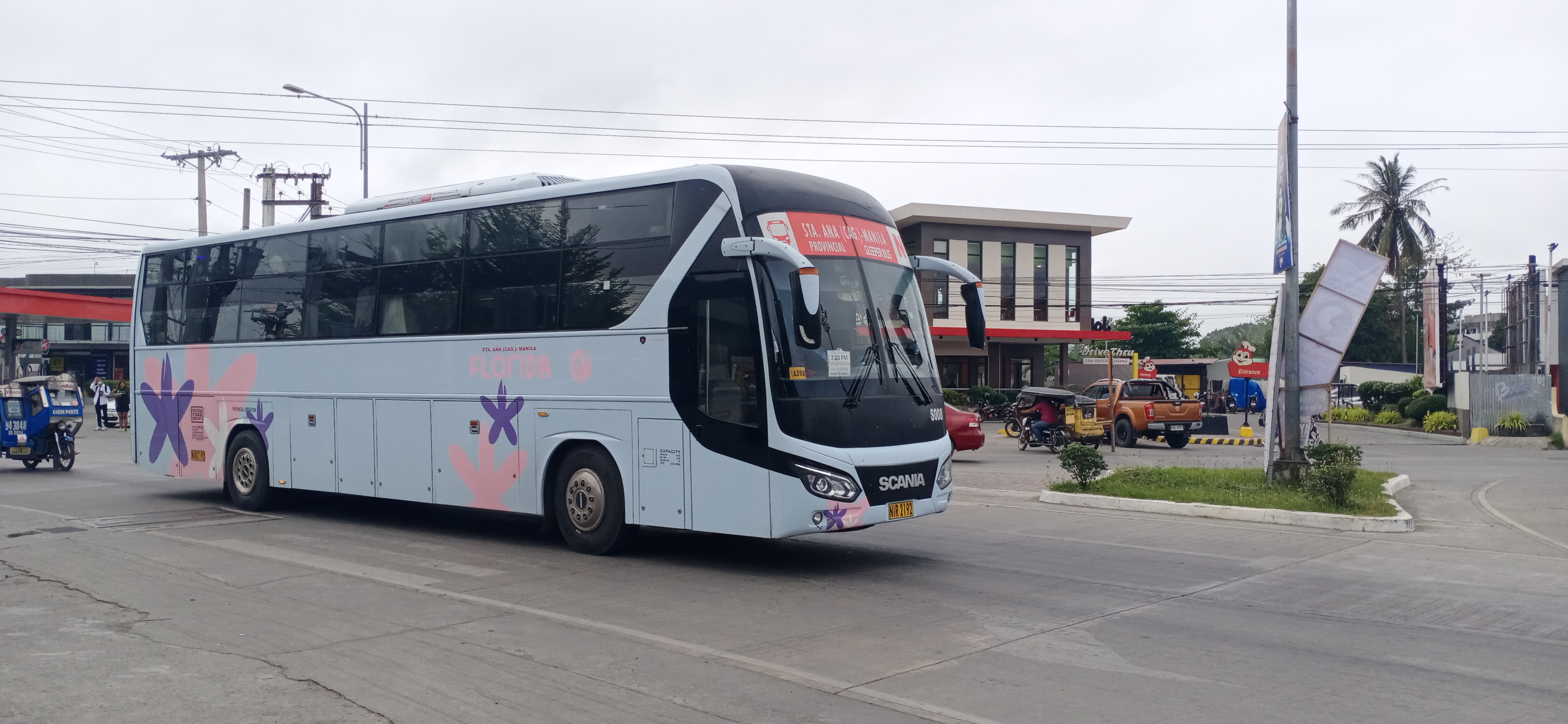
One of GV Florida's Executive Sleeper units. A DMMWI DM23 Series 1 in Scania K360IB Platform.

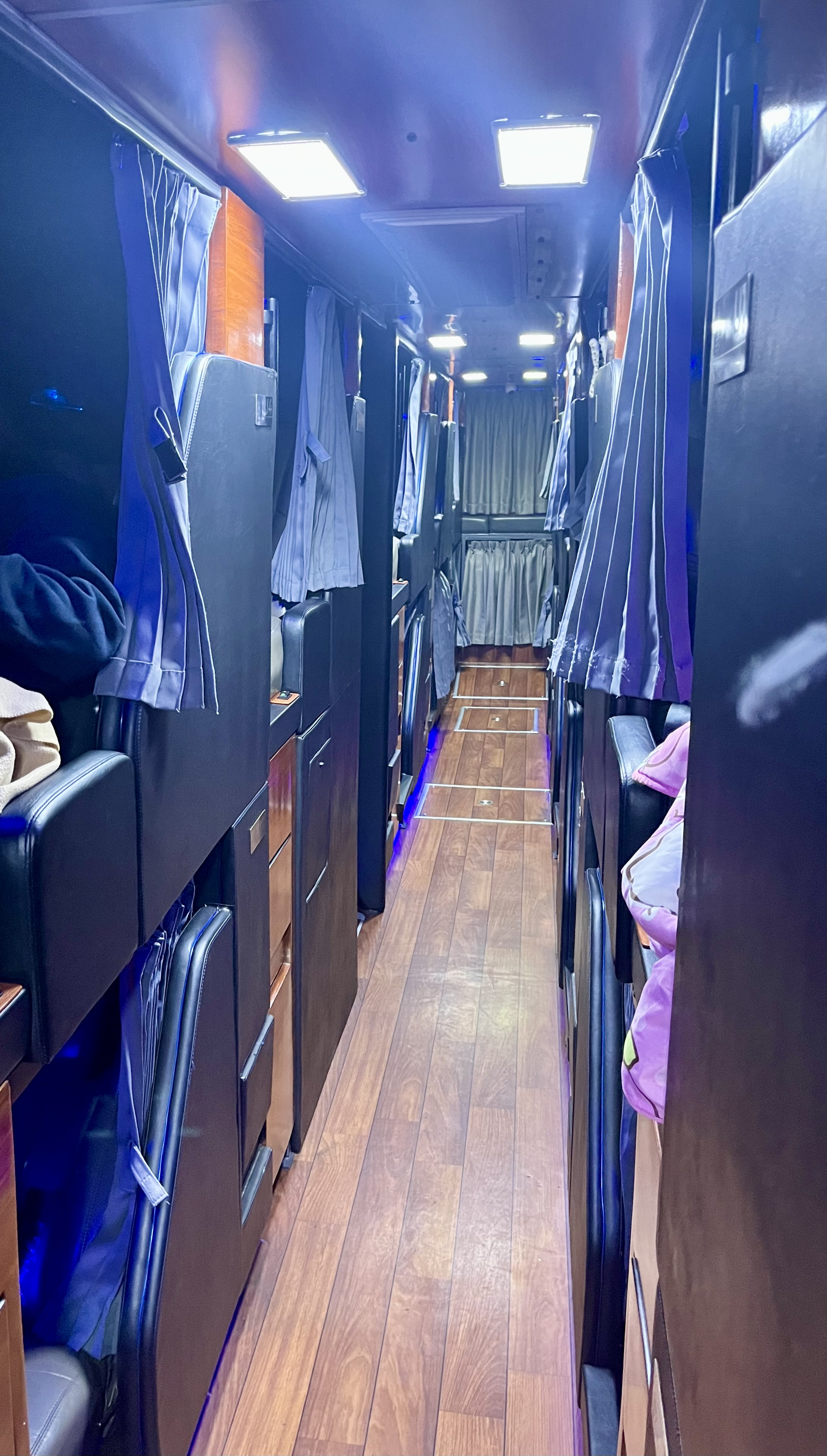
Interior of GV Florida Transport's Executive Sleeper

GV Florida introduced the Executive Class in mid-2024 as a point-to-point (P2P) and an upgraded service to its existing fare classes to better compete with other bus companies' product offerings such as "Royal Class" of Victory Liner and "Joybus" of Genesis Transport.

- Executive Deluxe - GV Florida revived the Executive Deluxe Class in mid-2025 as an enhanced version of the Deluxe Class the features 41 seats in 4-abreast (2–2) seating layout (wider legroom versus deluxe class), individual bus pad tablets in each seat with USB charging, LCD TV, and on-board toilet. Utilized by Scania K360IB, Hino RM2PSS, Zhongtong LCK6123CRA and LCK6129H "H12", and Higer KLQ6127LA "Tourist" and KLQ6126LY "V12" fleet.
- Executive Super Deluxe - Similar to Super Deluxe but features 3-abreast (1–2) "Lazyboy" seating layout, 2 LCD TV, individual bus pad tablets in each seat with USB charging, on-board restroom and additional of complementary free snacks and on-board USB Charging. Utilized by Hino RM2PSS, Zhongtong LCK6129H "H12", Scania K360IB and Scania K410CB fleet.
- Executive Sleeper - An upgraded sleeper bus service which features 23 premium pods in 2-abreast (1–1) configuration. Bus pads tablets with headphones were provided in each pod in-lieu of TV sets for entertainment, and also includes on-board restroom and complimentary snacks, headrest, blankets, and USB Charging. This is currently the flagship service of GV Florida. The entire Executive Sleeper Class was utilized by the Scania K360IB and Scania K410CB fleet.

Audio and Video systems and Airconditioning are standard on all of its buses. On-board toilets were standard for the majority of its fleet except the Regular Fare class. Some newer units feature either on-board Power outlet or USB Charging.

=== Livery and Body Colors ===
GV Florida was known to sport their current livery which consist of a pastel color based on fare class with floral themed livery adorned on all sides of the bus. The colors they are using were:

- The Regular Fare, Deluxe Fare (and its executive variant) were painted Pink. It is the most common body color among the fleet and the official color of the company.
- The Super Deluxe and Sleeper buses, and early batches of Executive Sleeper were painted Light Blue
- The newest body color, Cyan, was exclusively used by the newer batches of Executive Sleeper and Executive (Scania) Super Deluxe.
- Transport Pro and Florida North buses were painted in Orange color.

Historically, GV Florida's fleets were painted two-tone magenta and white color with multicolored splash livery design, and was later updated with White body color with pink/yellow rainbow livery design.

== Fleet numbering ==
=== G.V. Florida Transport has its own special numberings on its fleet. ===
- GD-series – currently used by locally built units that were made by Del Monte Motor Works, Inc, Pura Bus (in-house body), and Hino Motors Philippines (Regular Fare, Deluxe and Super Deluxe). Historically exclusive fleet number for Golden Dragon XML6127 Marcopolo Super Deluxe units and was the basis for its future locally made units since.
- T-series - assigned to Transport Pro Service.
- H-series – assigned to Higer units.
- S-series – assigned to Sleeper Buses. (not to be confused with S00* series)
- S00 series – assigned exclusively to Scania units. (not to be confused with S-series)
- FN00 series - assigned to Florida North Transport OPC
- 001-999 – Regular and Deluxe Fare original series. assigned as temporary fleet number for new units. Also assigned to Gabriel Trans and St. Joseph Transport units.

=== Retired Fleet numbering ===
- Bullet/B-Series (B1 and B2) – formerly used by DMMC Aero Extreme Hino RM Super Deluxe units.
- KL-series (KL1 and KL2) – formerly used by Kinglong XMQ6127 units.
- Deck of Cards (Ten Long, Jack Long & Queen Long) – formerly assigned to DMMC Aero Adamant Hino RM Super Deluxe units mimicking their then-newly released King Long units (KL series).
- J-series – Kia Granbird exclusive fleet numbering (Regular Fare).
- F-series – formerly assigned to Korean branded units.
- HS-series – assigned to Higer sleeper units.
- D-series - formerly assigned to Dangwa Transport's units before fully absorbed by GV Florida. (Re-numbered to GD-series for Hino units & S00* series for Scania units)

== Operating fleet ==
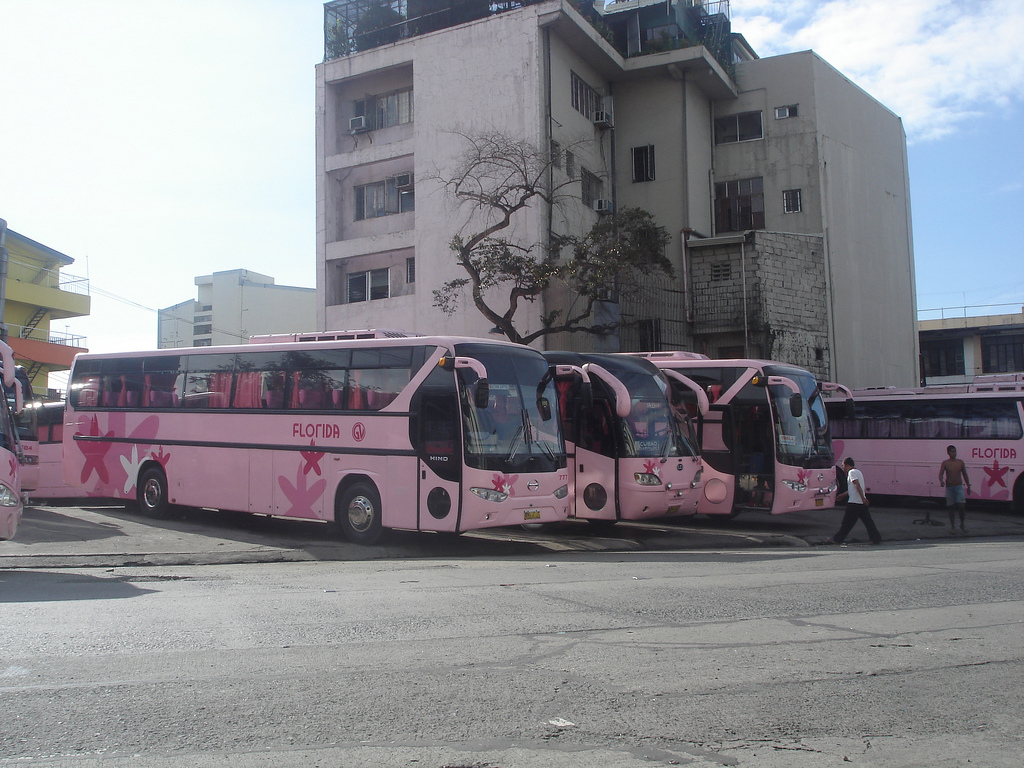
GV Florida Transport buses parked on their motorpool.

=== Current fleet ===
- Del Monte Motor Works, Inc.
  - DM14 Series 1
    - Hino RM2PSS 1630
  - DM16 Series 1
    - Hino RM2PSS 1630
    - Hino RN8JSUA 1626
    - Zhongtong LCK6123RA
  - DM22T "Local Touring" (Sleeper variant) (no. S003 & S004)
    - Scania K360IB 4x2
  - DM23 Series 1 (no. S0020 and S008)
    - Scania K360IB 4x2
  - DM24 Series 1
    - Scania K360IB 4x2
  - first generation GD XML6127 'Marcopolo' replica
    - Hino RM2PSS 1630
    - Hino RU2PSS 1733 (in KTP Chassis)
    - Hyundai Aero Express HSX
    - MAN R39 18.350 HOCL
    - Hyundai Aero Space LS
- Hino Motors Philippines
  - Hino Grandeza
    - Hino RM2PSS 1630
  - Hino Grandecho II
    - Hino RM2PSS 1630
  - Hino Grandeza 2
    - Hino RN8JSUA 1626
- Higer
  - KLQ6123KQ U-Tour
  - KLQ6118H U-Tour (Regular Fare for GMW Trans)
  - KLQ6128LQ U-Tour
  - KLQ6127LA "Tourist"
  - V12 KLQ6126LY "New V-series"
- Zhongtong Bus
  - LCK6118H Elegance (Regular Fare unit for GMW Trans)
  - LCK6129H "H12"
- PURA Bus - (in-house custom body builds)
  - DM14 custom unit
    - Hino RM2PSS 1630
  - DM16 custom unit
    - Hino RM2PSS 1630
    - Hino RN8JSUA 1626
    - Zhongtong LCK6123CRA
  - DM24 custom unit
    - Hino RM2PSS 1630
    - Scania K360IB 4x2
    - Scania K410CB 4x2
    - Zhongtong LCK6123CRA
  - Higer KLQ6123/6128 "U-Tour" custom unit
    - Hino RM2PSS 1630
    - Hino RN8JSUA 1626
    - Zhongtong LCK6123CRA
  - Higer V12 KLQ6126 custom unit
    - Higer YS chassis
    - Hino RM2PSS 1630
    - Scania K410CB 4x2
    - Zhongtong LCK6129 (Florida North unit)

=== Former/Retired/Scrapped fleet ===
- Del Monte Motor Works, Inc.
  - DM09
    - Mercedes-Benz OH-1625 (Autobus acquired units)
    - Hino RF821
  - DM11
    - Hino RF821 (Dagupan Bus Co. Inc. ordinary units)
  - Aero Adamant
    - Hino RF821
    - Hino RM2PSS 1630 (Rebodied to newer bus model)
    - Hino RK3HS
    - Nissan Diesel RB46S
    - Mercedes-Benz OH-1625 (Autobus acquired units)
  - Aero Extreme
    - Hino RM2PSS 1630 (Rebodied to newer bus model)
    - Hino RF821
    - Nissan Diesel RB46S
    - Nissan Diesel JA520RAN
    - Mercedes-Benz OH-1625
  - Lion Star
    - Hino RF821
    - Nissan Diesel RB46S
    - Daewoo BV113
  - Euro Bus
    - Hino RF821
    - Nissan Diesel RB46S/R
    - Nissan Diesel JA430SAN
  - first-generation GD XML6127 Marcopolo replica (Florida Series)
    - Hino RF821
    - Isuzu CQR660
    - Nissan Diesel RB46S
    - Hyundai Aero Space LS
    - Daewoo BH116
    - Kia Granbird (SD-I Greenfield, SD-II Parkway, & HD Sunshine)
- PURA Bus
  - DM11
    - Hyundai Aero Express HSX
    - Hyundai Aero Space LS
    - Daewoo BH116
    - Hino RF821
    - Nissan Diesel RB46S
- Pilipinas Hino Inc.
  - Hino MR-Series
    - Hino RM2PSS 1630
    - Hino RF821
  - Hino Grandeza
    - Hyundai Aero
    - Daewoo BH115
    - Daewoo BH116
    - SsangYong Transstar
    - Kia Granbird
  - Hino Prisma
    - Hino RF821
- Nissan Diesel Philippines Corp.
  - Euro Bus
    - Nissan Diesel JA430SAN
    - Nissan Diesel RB46S/SR
- Hyundai Motor Company
  - Hyundai Aero Space LS
  - Hyundai Aero Express
  - Hyundai Aero Queen
- Kia Motors
  - Kia Granbird SD-I, SD-II & HD "Sunshine"
- Daewoo Bus
  - BH115E
  - BH116
- Ssangyong
  - SsangYong Transstar
- King Long
  - XMQ6127 J3 "Euro Star"
  - XMQ6111CY (acquired unit from Gabriel Trans)
- Higer
  - V92W KLQ6129QWE3 Sleeper bus
- Golden Dragon (company)
  - XML6127E2 "Marco Polo"
  - XML6127J13W "Marco Polo" Sleeper bus

== Terminals ==
=== GV Florida ===
Cagayan Valley

- Cagayan
  - Abulug (Junction Luna)
  - Alcala
  - Aparri
  - Baggao
  - Ballesteros
  - Buguey
  - Claveria
  - Enrile
  - Faire (Sto.Nino, Cagayan)
  - Nabaccayan/Palagao Norte (Gattaran, Cagayan)
  - Gonzaga
  - Lasam
  - Piat
  - Tuao
  - Tuguegarao
  - Sanchez-Mira
  - Santa Ana
- Isabela
  - Aurora
  - Burgos
  - Cabatuan
  - Cauayan
  - Delfin Albano
  - Echague
  - Ilagan
  - Jones
  - Luna
  - Roxas
  - San Agustin
  - San Mateo
  - Santiago
  - Tumauini
- Quirino
  - Maddela

Ilocos Region (some routes were shared with Transport Pro)

- Ilocos Norte
  - Batac
  - Dingras
  - Laoag
  - Nueva Era
  - Pagudpud
  - Piddig
  - Solsona

Cordillera Administrative Region (some routes were shared with Gabriel Trans and St. Joseph Transport)

- Abra
  - Bangued
- Benguet
  - Baguio
- Ifugao
  - Banawe (served by Dangwa Transport, Co.)

=== GMW Trans ===
==== Inter-Provincial Routes (vice versa) ====
Cagayan Valley

- Isabela
  - Delfin Albano
  - Roxas
  - Santiago

Cordillera Administrative Region

- Pudtol-Luna
- Kabugao
- Abra
  - Bangued
- Benguet
  - Baguio

Ilocos Region

- Ilocos Norte
  - Laoag
- Ilocos Sur
  - Bantay (which is just outside Vigan)

== See also ==
- Dagupan Bus Company
- List of bus companies of the Philippines
