= Philippine Rabbit =

Bus company in the Philippines

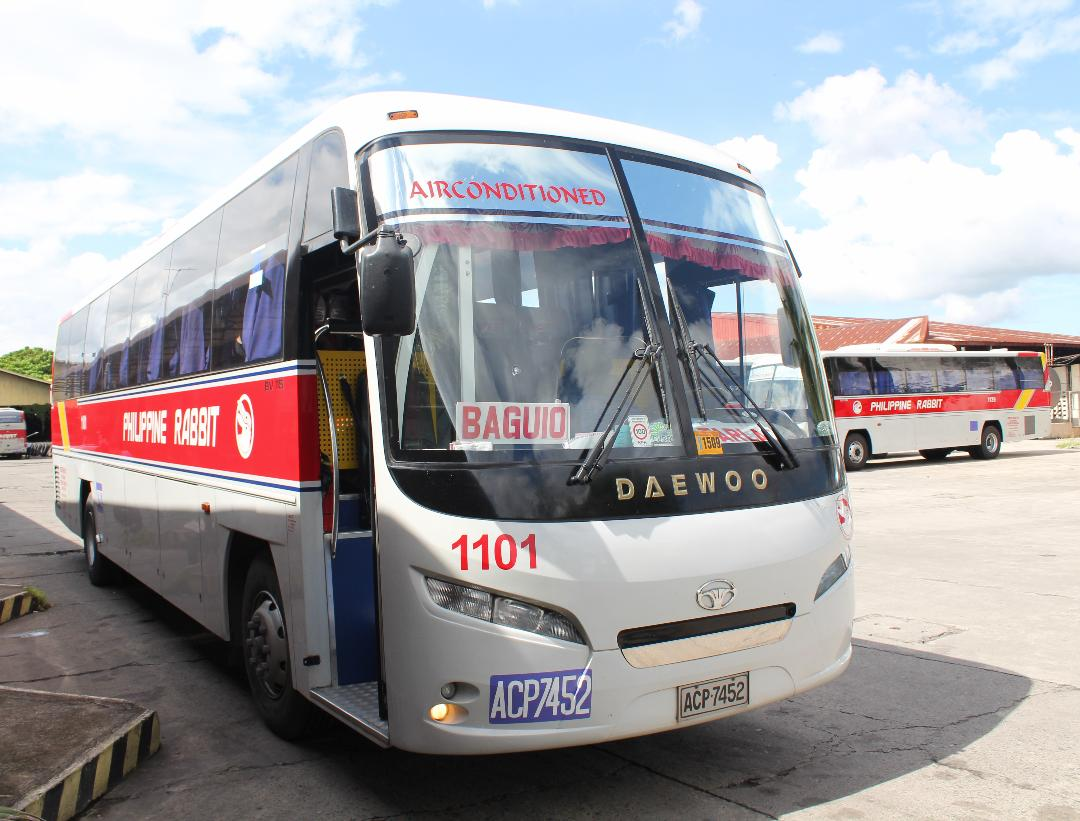
- Founded: August 28, 1946; 80 years ago
- Headquarters: McArthur Highway, Sto. Cristo, Tarlac City, Tarlac
- Locale: Luzon
- Service area: Metro Manila; Central Luzon; Pangasinan; Baguio
- Service type: Provincial Operation
- Hubs: Avenida; Tarlac
- Fleet: 200+
- Operator: Philippine Rabbit Bus Lines, Inc.

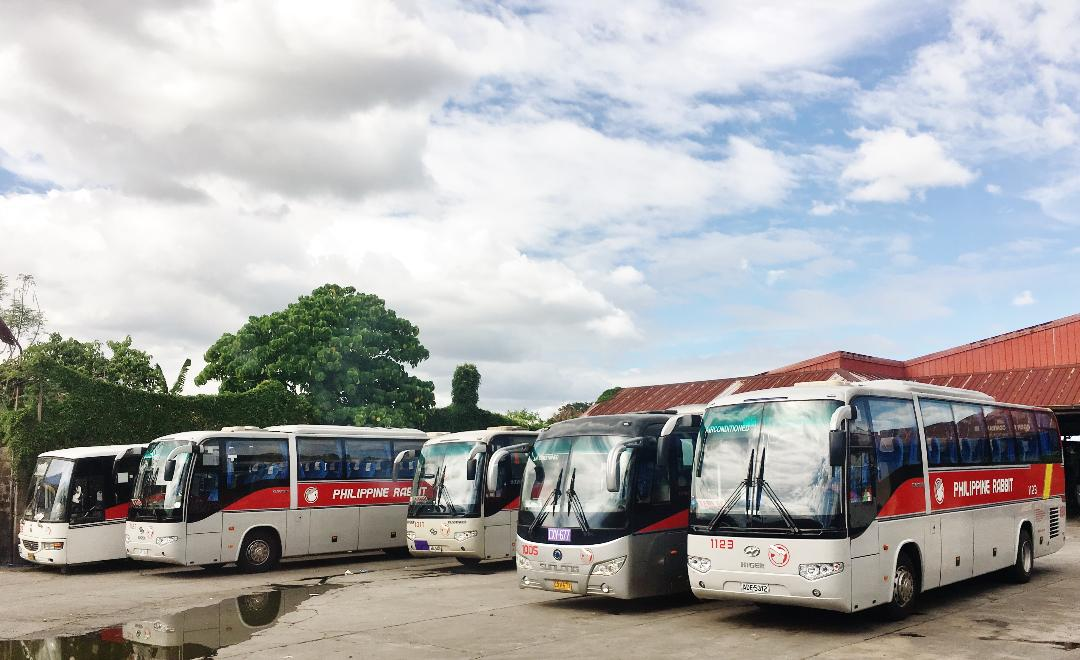
Philippine Rabbit at Tarlac Terminal

Philippine Rabbit Bus Lines, Inc. (PRBL) is a provincial bus company in the Philippines. It was founded in 1946 and is one of the oldest bus companies in the country. The company's area of coverage extends from Metro Manila to Baguio and northern provinces of Pampanga and Tarlac. Its main terminal in Metro Manila is along Avenida in Santa Cruz, Manila.

Philippine Rabbit was once known for their red, rivet-studded buses powered by Isuzu, with the illuminated sign at the front, which once became a staple of roads in Northern Luzon. They were eventually supplanted by more modern Nissan Diesel units.

== History ==
Philippine Rabbit was founded on August 28, 1946 by brothers-in-law, Florencio P. Buan and Ricardo L. Paras. It was then named Philippine Rabbit Bus Company, Ltd. They started with two salvaged US Army weapon carriers which they bought in a junk shop in Mabalacat, Pampanga. Their maiden trip was from Divisoria, Manila with a stopover in San Fernando, Pampanga. On its one year of operation, the company was operating ten US Army weapon carriers converted to passenger trucks. In 1952, they acquired front-engined International Harvester buses which operated from Manila to Moncada, Camiling, Victoria, La Paz, Concepcion and Tarlac City. The company was incorporated on August 28, 1957 with the business name Philippine Rabbit Bus Lines, Incorporated.

On March 25, 1963, the PRBL incorporators organized the Bupar Motors Corporation as the exclusive distributor of Mitsubishi Fuso engines and spare parts in the country. The corporation also included a bus body building plant (which built their famous red, rivet-studded buses) and a tire recapping facility. In 1977 PRBL opened its Rabbitours Division in its Caloocan Terminal on 2nd Avenue to handle chartered trips for domestic tours. With the tax incentives the government gives to Tourism oriented companies, PRBL started acquiring air-conditioned buses. In the start of the 1980s, the Company started modernizing its bus fleet with air-conditioned buses servicing the routes to Baguio, Balanga, Bataan, Laoag, Ilocos Norte, and Tarlac.

In January 1992, PRBL started its bus fleet rehabilitation. They announced the acquisition of 150 brand new air conditioned buses for its 3-year modernization program to meet the demands for safe and convenient travel on air conditioned buses. Twenty Mitsubishi De Luxe (2001 series) were commissioned in 1992; another thirty Nissan Diesel (Aero Bus Series) in 1993; Fifty Nissan Diesel (Flexi Series) in 1994, and another fifty Nissan Diesel (Euro Bus Series 3015) in 1995.

In 1998, the Philippine Rabbit became one of the sponsors of the Metropolitan Basketball Association in partnership with the Philippine media company ABS-CBN Corporation. The company renewed its partnership with ABS-CBN in February 2000.

=== Labor dispute and losses ===
In 2002, the company's workers conducted a 50 day strike. By November 2002, the company was forced to close its offices due to the strike. The strike ended on 19 December 2002 after the company's workers and management came to an agreement.

On April 5, 2004, the company's employees went on strike and demanded for the prompt payment of salaries and benefits, their 13th Month Pay, Retirement benefits, and service incentive pays, including the immediate updating of employees' SSS premium contributions and collected SSS Salary loan deductions. They also cite the non-implementation of agreement between the workers and the Philippine Rabbit dated December 2002.

== Fleet ==
Philippine Rabbit Bus Lines, Inc. currently operates air conditioned buses and utilizes a fleet of Daewoo, Hyundai, Higer, Sunlong and Yutong buses.

=== Current ===
Guilin Daewoo

- Guilin Daewoo GDW6119H2

Higer Bus Company Limited

- Higer KLQ6109AE3 "V90"
- Higer KLQ6119E3 "V91"

Santarosa Motor Works

- Santarosa Motor Works Jetliner bus body
  - Daewoo BV115

Shanghai Shenlong Bus Co., Ltd.

- Sunlong SLK6112
- Sunlong SLK6116

Zhengzhou Yutong Group Co., Ltd.

- Yutong ZK6117H "C11"

=== Former ===
Daewoo Motor Company (Daewoo Bus)

- Daewoo BH115E Royal Economy
- Daewoo BH116 Royal Luxury
- Daewoo BH117 Royal Cruistar

Del Monte Motor Works

- Del Monte Motor Works Aero Xtreme bus body
  - Nissan Diesel RB31S
- Del Monte Motor Works Adamant bus body
  - Nissan Diesel RB31S
- Del Monte Motor Works DM09 bus body
  - Nissan Diesel RB31S

Hyundai Motor Company

- Hyundai Aero Space LS

Kia Motors Corporation

- Kia Granbird KM948 SD-I Greenfield
- Kia Granbird KM949H HD Sunshine

Santarosa Motor Works

- Santarosa Motor Works Exfoh bus body
  - Nissan Diesel RB46SR
- Santarosa Motor Works Flexi bus body
  - Nissan Diesel RB31S
- Santarosa Motor Works SDX bus body
  - Nissan Diesel RB46SX

Nissan Diesel Philippines Corporation

- Nissan Diesel Euro Trans bus body
  - Nissan Diesel RB46S
  - Nissan Diesel RB46SR
  - Nissan Diesel JA430SAN
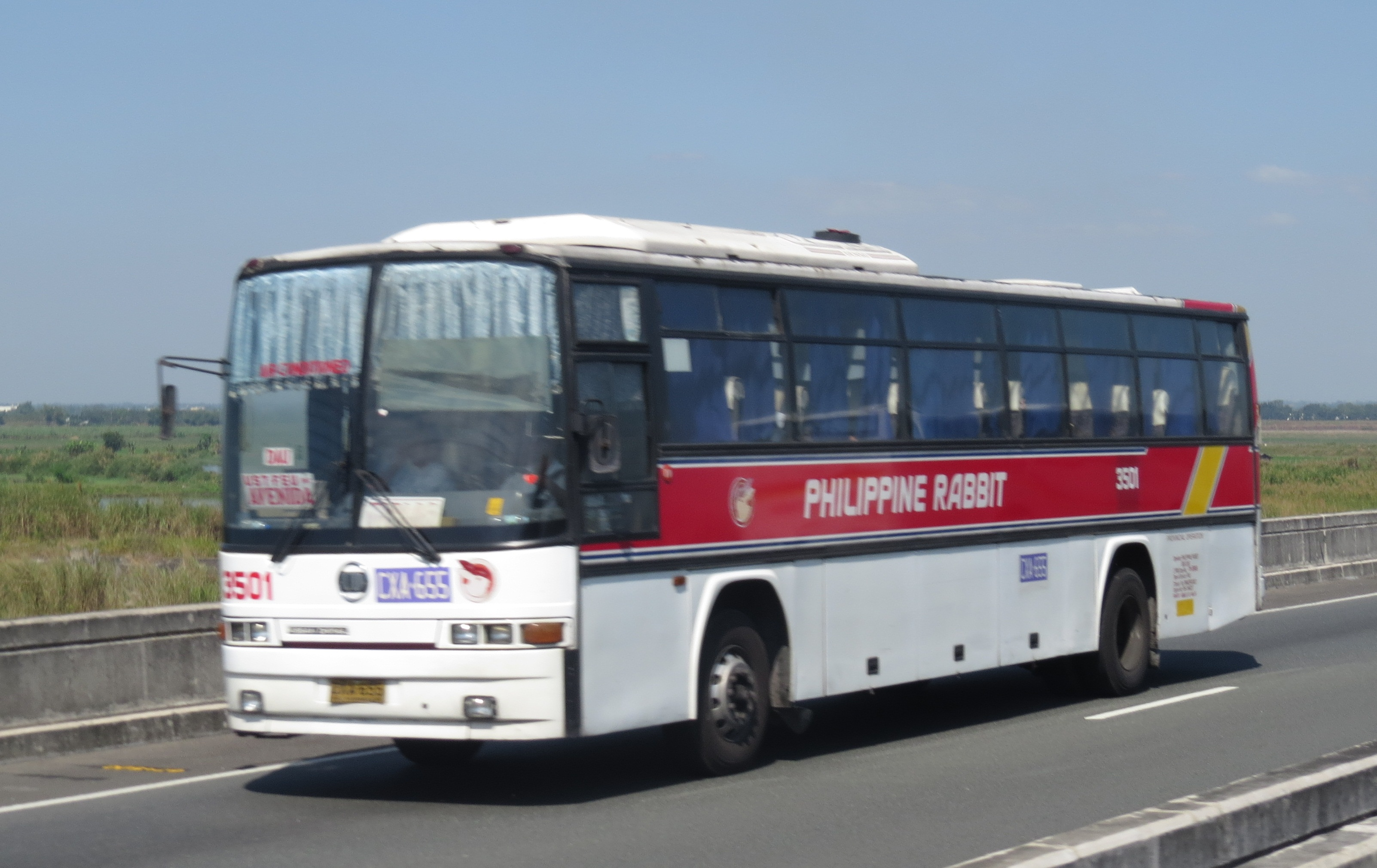
Nissan Diesel Euro Trans

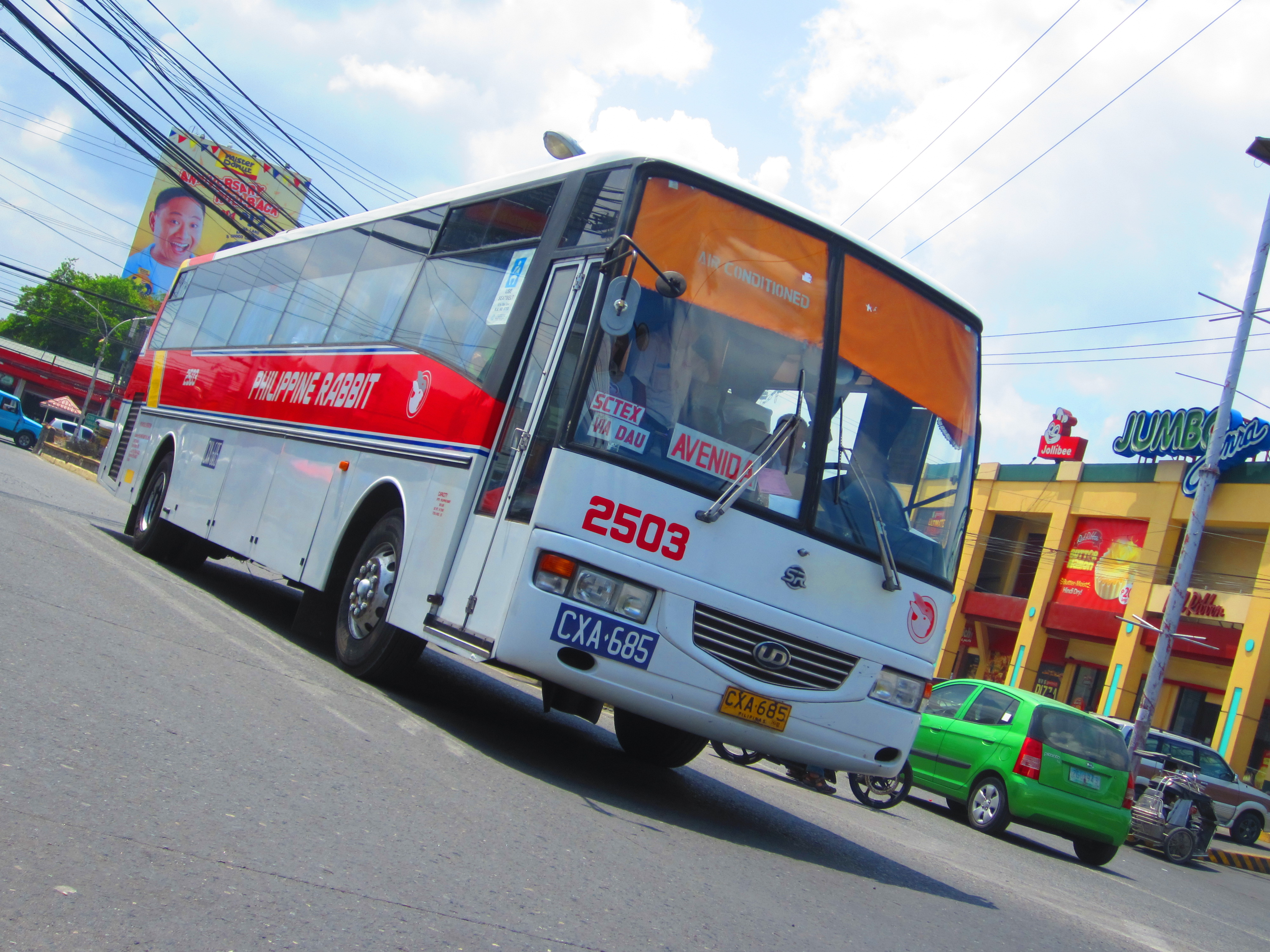
Nissan Diesel Exfoh RB46S

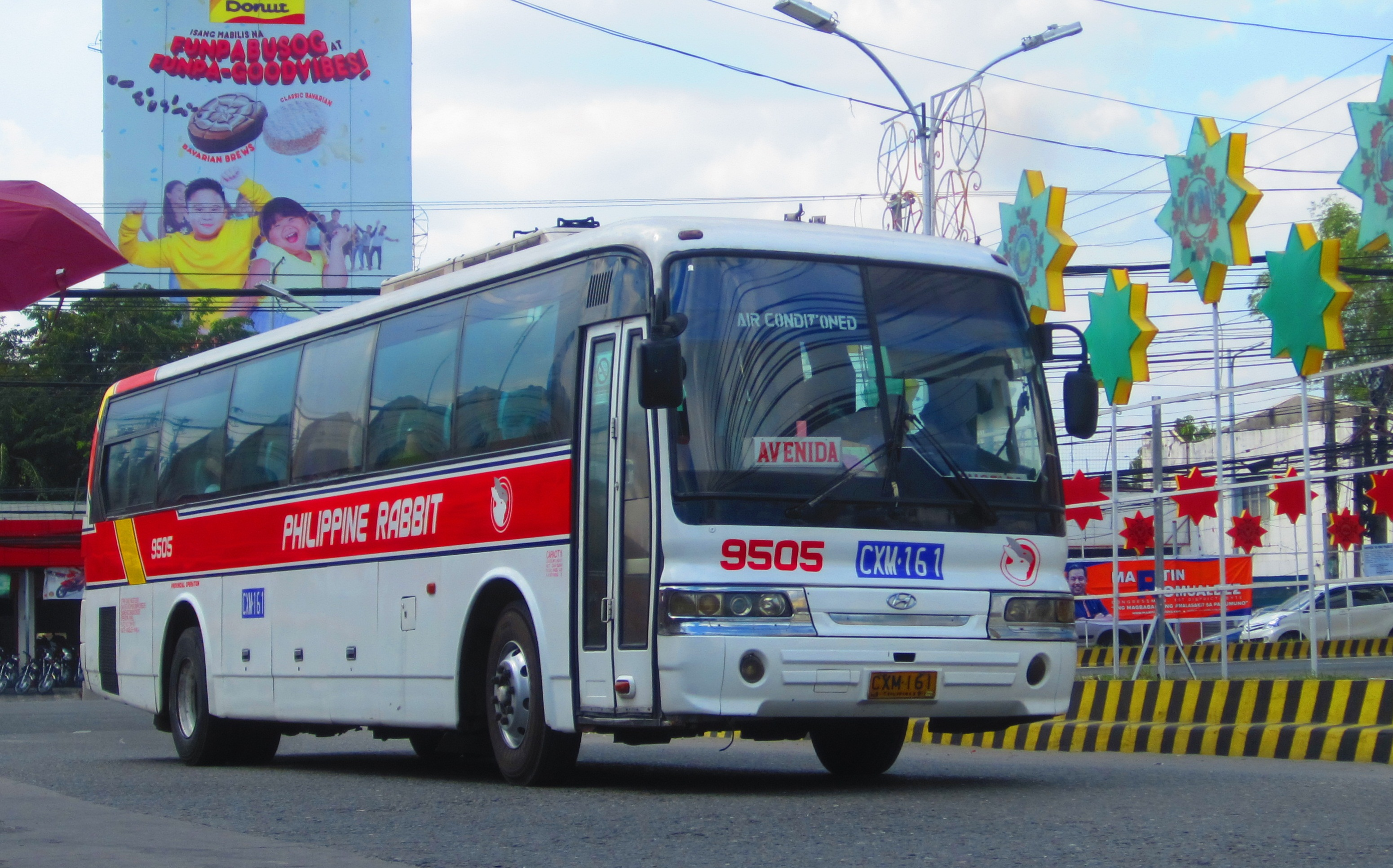
Hyundai Aero Space LS

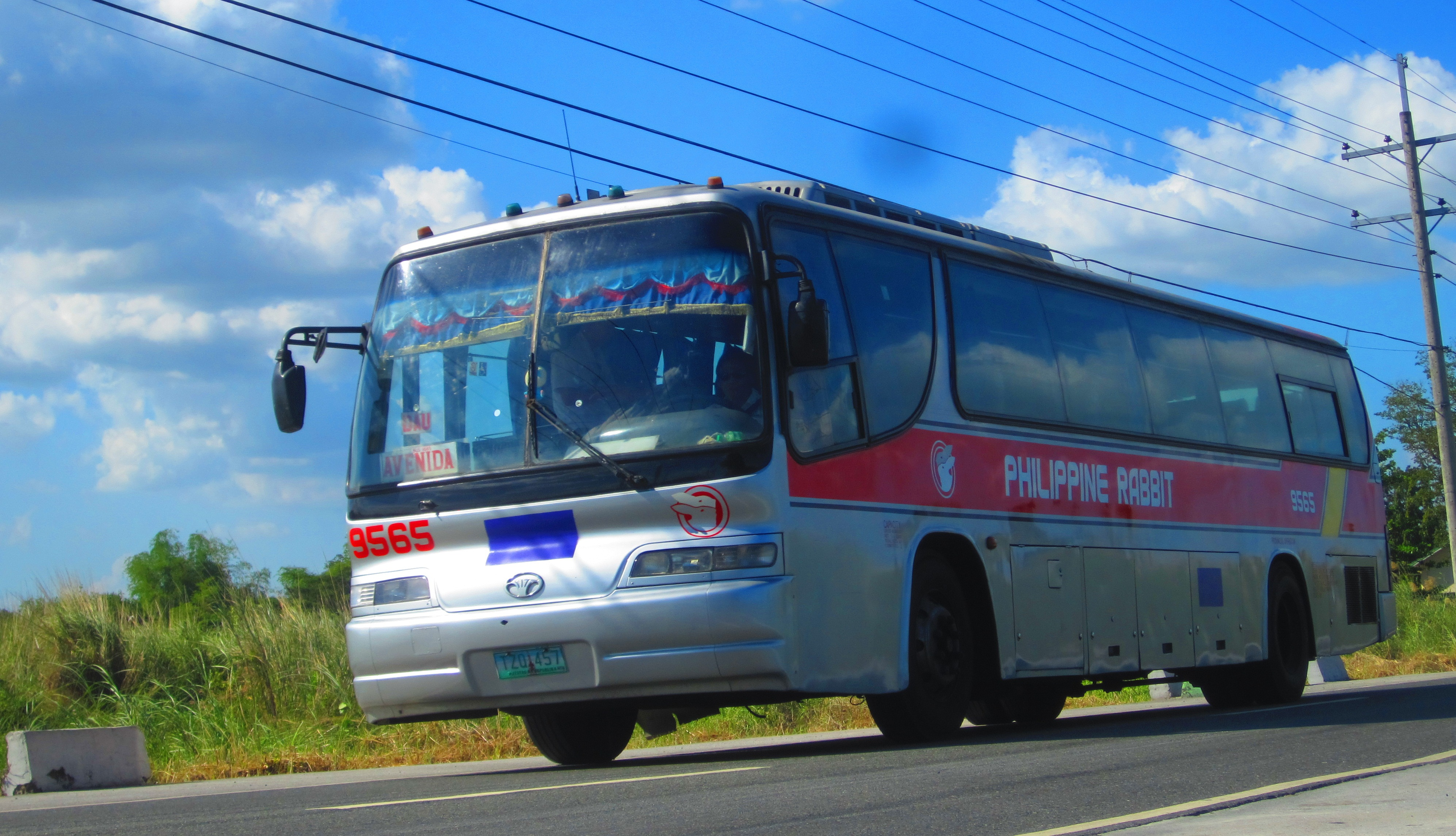
Daewoo BH115E "Royal Economy"

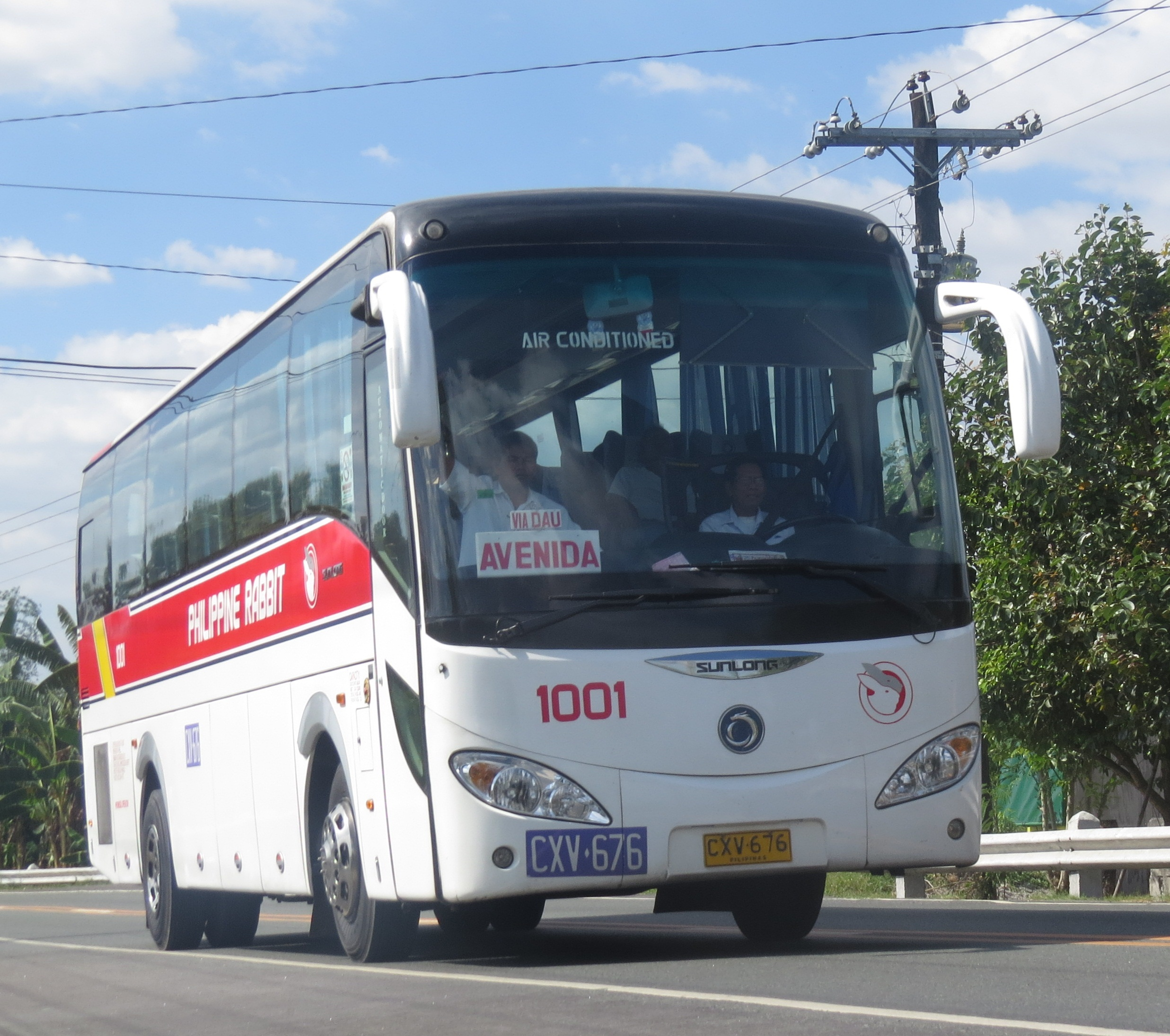
Sunlong SLK6116

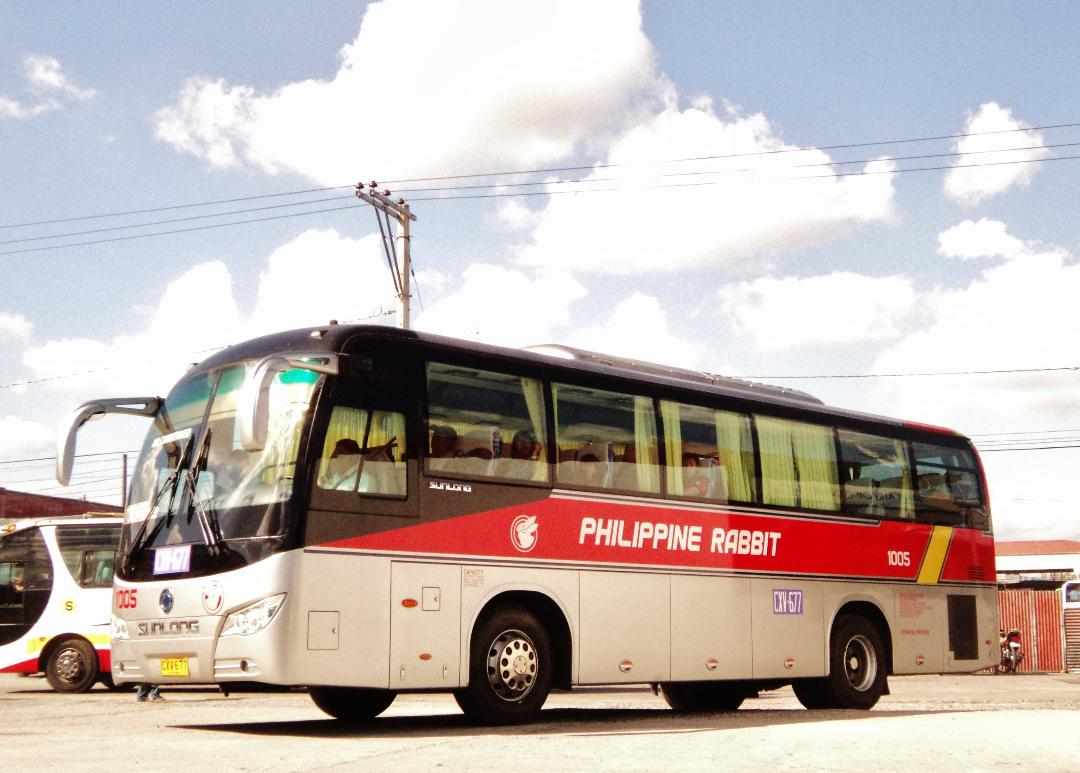
Sunlong SLK6112

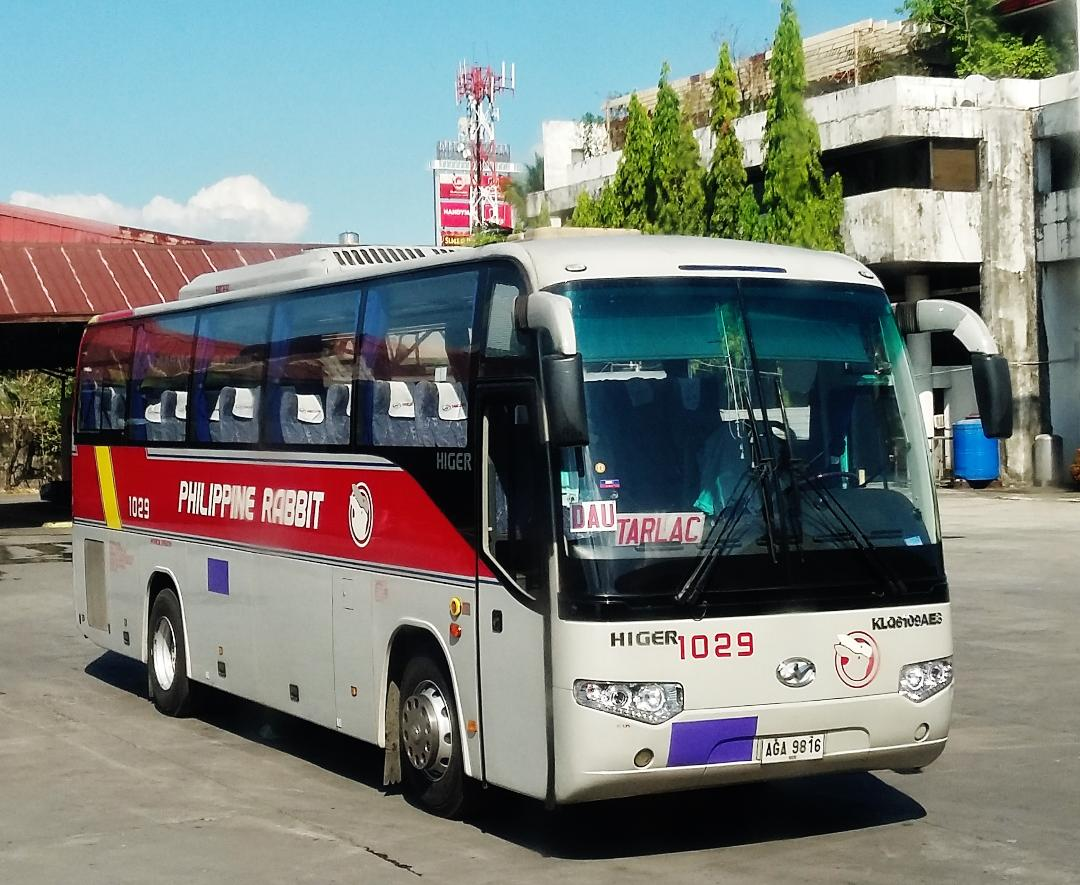
Higer V90 - KLQ6109

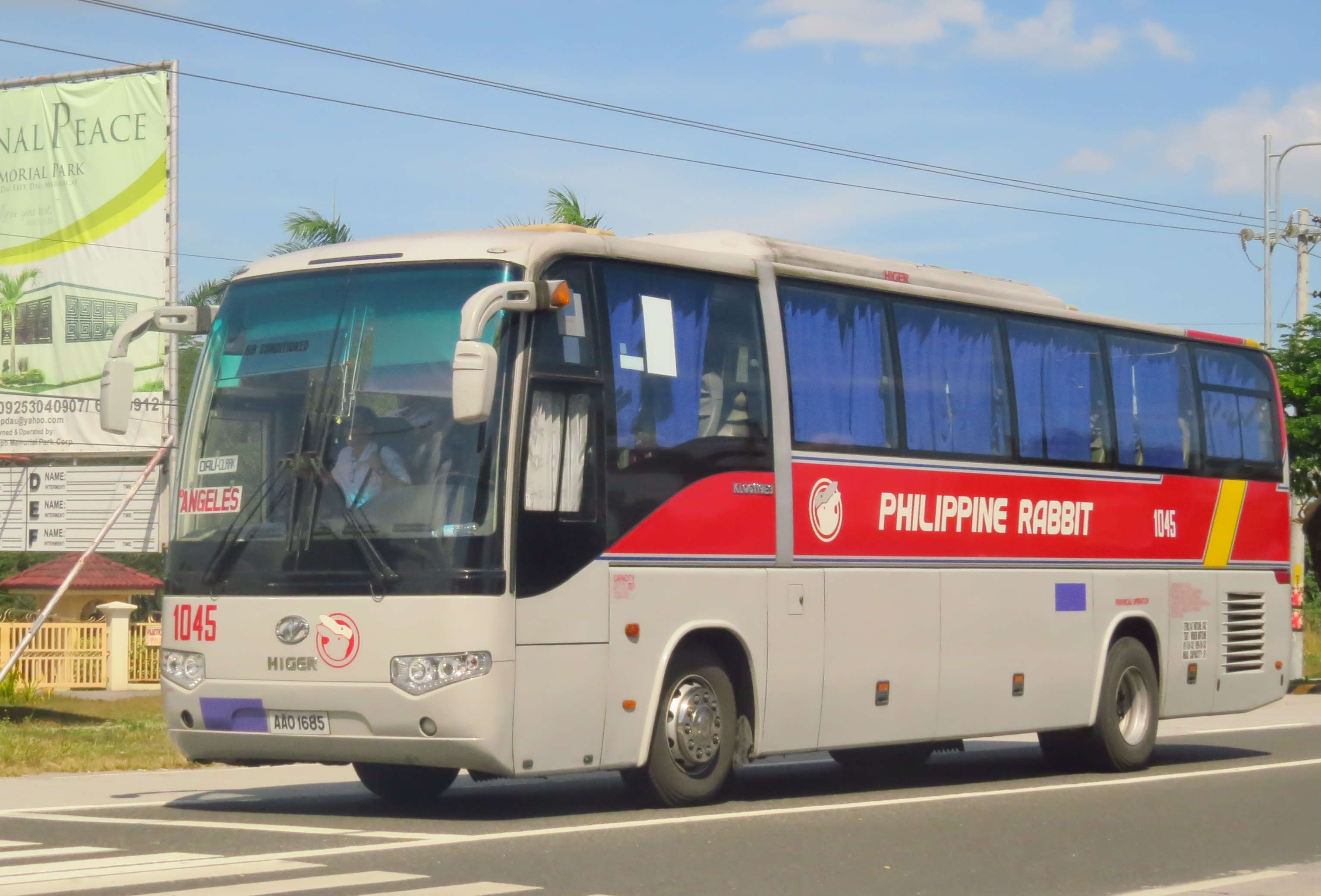
Higer V91 - KLQ6119 (280HP)

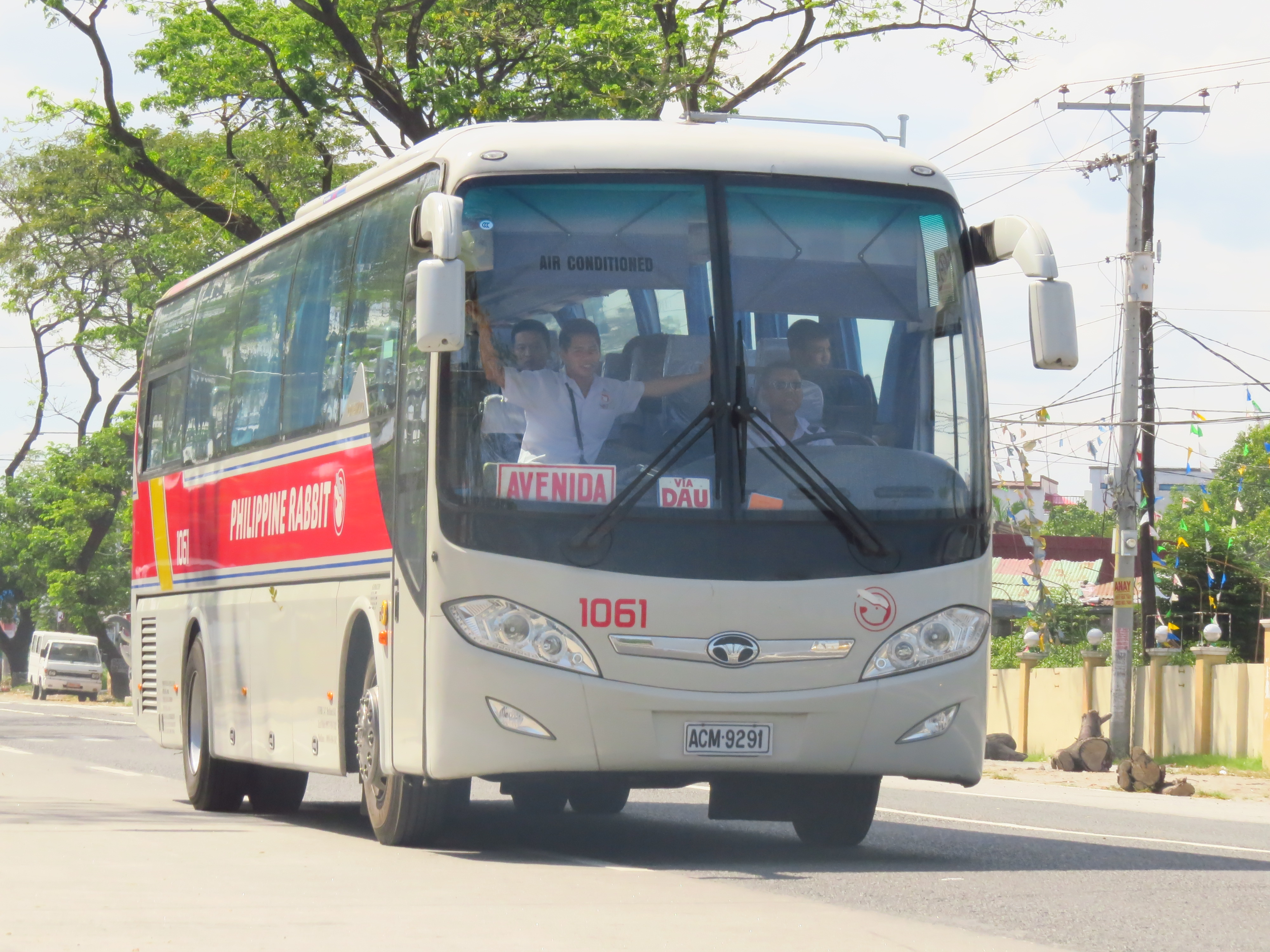
Guillin Daewoo GDW6119H2

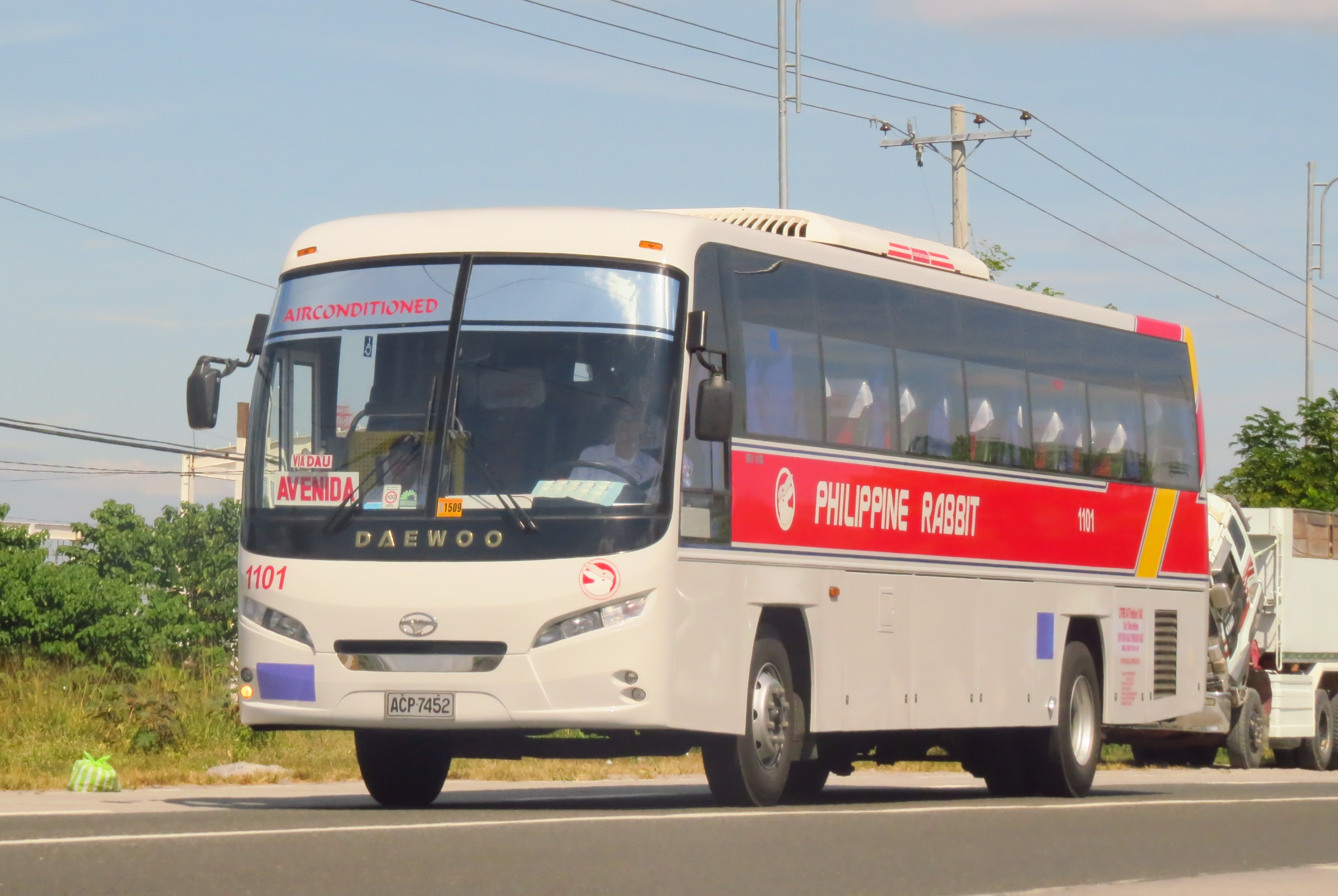
Daewoo BV115 "Jetliner"

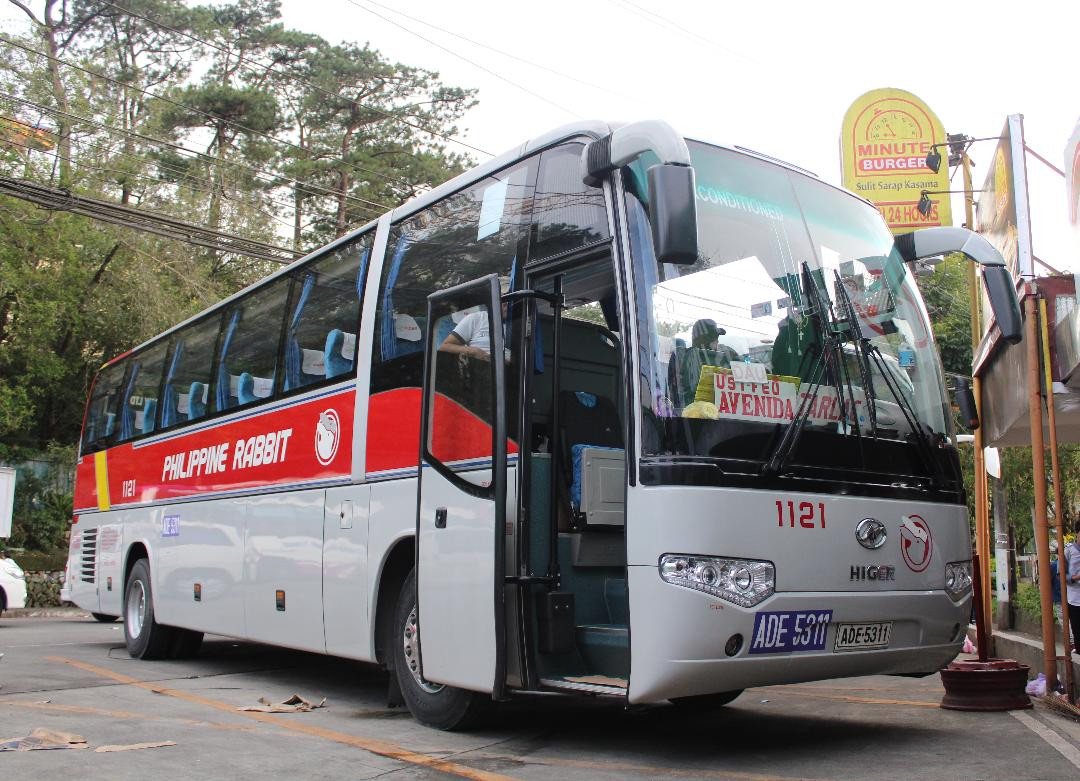
Higer V91 - KLQ6119E3 (310HP)

Yutong ZK6117H "C11"

== Destinations ==
=== Metro Manila ===
- MacArthur Highway, Caloocan (Bonifacio Rotonda)
- Avenida, Manila

=== Provincial Destinations ===
- San Fernando, Pampanga (via Malolos)
- Mabalacat, Pampanga (Dau Bus Terminal)
- Marquee Mall, Angeles City, Pampanga (via Porac, Pampanga)
- Porac, Pampanga
- Tarlac City, Tarlac
- Camiling, Tarlac
- Baguio
- Alaminos, Pangasinan (via Camiling, Tarlac)

== Former Destinations ==
- Araneta City Bus Port, Cubao, Quezon City
- Balintawak, Quezon City
- Concepcion, Tarlac
- Santa Cruz, Zambales (via Alaminos)
- Iba, Zambales
- Bolinao, Pangasinan
- Dagupan
- San Fernando, La Union
- Vigan, Ilocos Sur
- Laoag, Ilocos Norte
- Aparri, Cagayan
- Bangued, Abra
- Balanga, Bataan
- Mariveles, Bataan

== See also ==
- List of bus companies of the Philippines
