= Del Monte Motors =

Filipino bus and truck manufacturer

Del Monte Motor Works, Inc.
- Industry: Coachbuilder
- Founded: 1950; 76 years ago
- Headquarters: Del Monte Avenue, Quezon City, Philippines
- Area served: Philippines
- Key people: Narciso O. Morales; President and Chairman
- Products: Truck and bus bodywork
- Subsidiaries: Del Monte Land Transport Bus company
- Website: www.delmontemotorworks.com

Del Monte Motor Works, Inc. (DMMW), also known as Del Monte Motors, is a bus and truck manufacturer headquartered in Quezon City, Philippines. It was established in 1950. The company offers a range of truck and bus bodies for its all major brands. It is also one of the leading bus body manufacturers in the Philippines, other including Santarosa Motor Works; Almazora Motors Corporation; and Hino Motors Philippines.

== History ==
In 1950, it started manufacturing bus and truck bodies mounted on leading US brands, being International Harvester, Ford, Chevrolet, and the Dodge Chassis. Also, in the 1950s, its sister company, the Emcos Development & Supply Co., Inc. was the leading distributor of International Harvester Macleod, Inc. in Northern Luzon marketing bus chassis, trucks, tractors, agricultural and farm implements.

At present, it is solely responsible for the introduction of Volvo articulated and bi-articulated buses in the Philippines. Philtrak, Volvo, and Del Monte have signed a supply and transfer of technology agreement wherein Volvo will supply its products, mainly the articulated and the bi-articulated bus chassis, and Del Monte will manufacture and assemble the bus body and deliver the finished bus product to Philtrak. Volvo agreed to transfer its technology in the assembly of its articulated and bi-articulated bus chassis to Philtrak and Del Monte jointly constituting a tri-partite agreement among the aforestated parties. Together, they intend to introduce the system not only in Metro Manila but all over the Philippines where the need arises especially on traffic clogged areas.

It is also responsible in re-activating the sale of Isuzu buses in the Philippines when the combined resources of General Motors Corporation, the Yutivo group and its local subsidiary folded up in the middle 1980s by importing directly from the factory of Japan's Isuzu and supplying different bus operators. It is still authorized to import bus and truck chassis on CBU basis and packaging it with the bus or truck body manufactured from its plant.

In 2009, after Batangas Laguna Tayabas Bus Company Incorporated (BLTBCo.)'s suspended operations and renovation for six years, DMMW took over the management of BLTBCo. They rename the company as Del Monte Land Transport Bus Company (DLTBCo), and continues routes to Metro Manila via Laguna, Quezon Province, Batangas Province, Camarines Sur, Camarines Norte, and Albay. Their buses are also made from the company with High Class Greyhound facilities.

In 2018, DMWW began working together with Hyundai to assemble a modern jeepney. Their first units, the Hyundai HD50S Class 2 Modern Jeepney, rolled off the assembly line in 2019. That same year, they began working together with Scania to build a body for their Scania Touring buses.

Pura Bus, an in-house body building division of GV Florida Transport, has a partnership with DMMW thus authorized to produce bus models similar with DMMWI's model line-up.

== Facilities ==
It has four existing plants and facilities in the Philippines. Two of them are located in Quezon City the third one at Sto. Tomas, Pampanga and the fourth one at Caloocan. It has a tested capacity of a minimum of sixty units of bus and truck bodies a month. It has supplied the majority of bus bodies for the government-owned corporations like the Metro Manila Transit Corporation and the PNR Motor Service. Before the introduction of these articulated buses, Del Monte has pioneered in the manufactured of bus trailers with a capacity of 200 passengers which were operated by MMTC in EDSA and by a private bus operator in the long stretch Marcos Highway. It was also involved in the assembly and rehabilitation of the British Leyland double deckers used to be operated by the same MMTC.

== Products ==
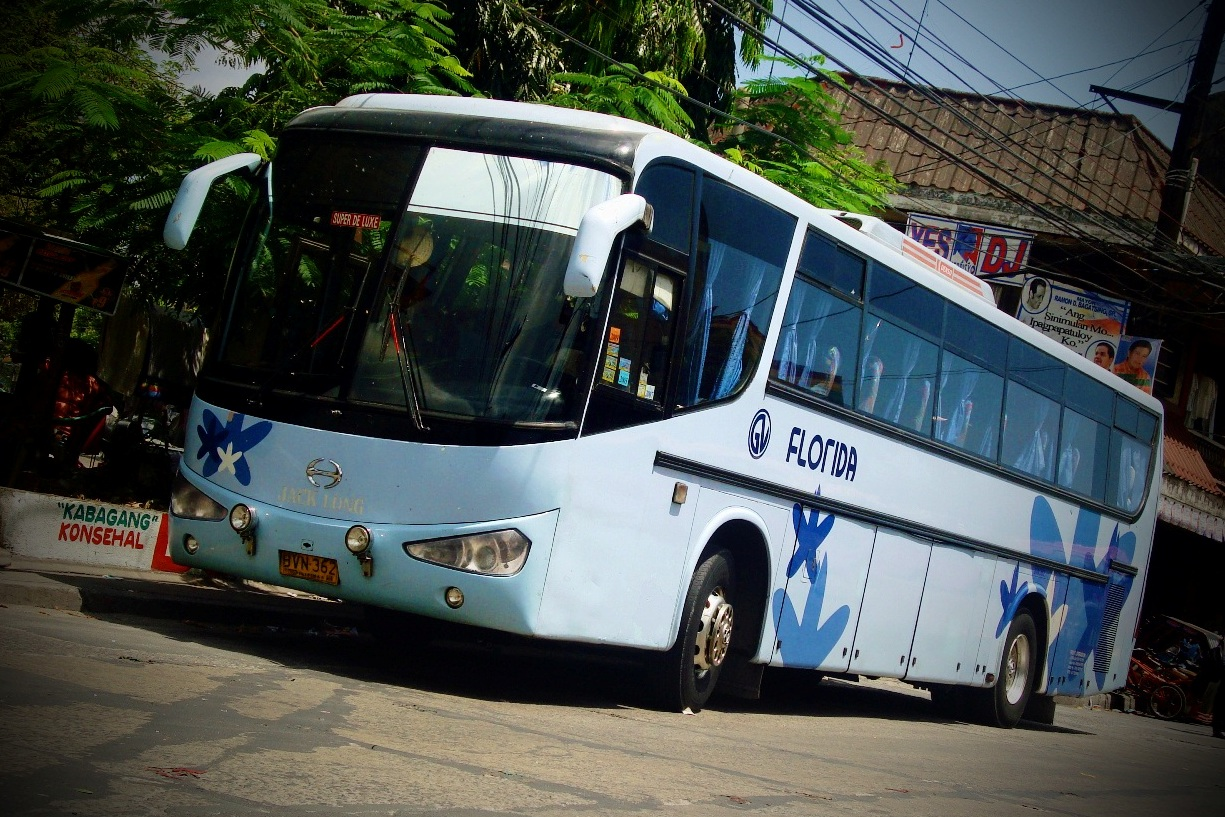
A DMMW Aero Adamant in Hino RM2P chassis operated by GV Florida Transport, Inc.

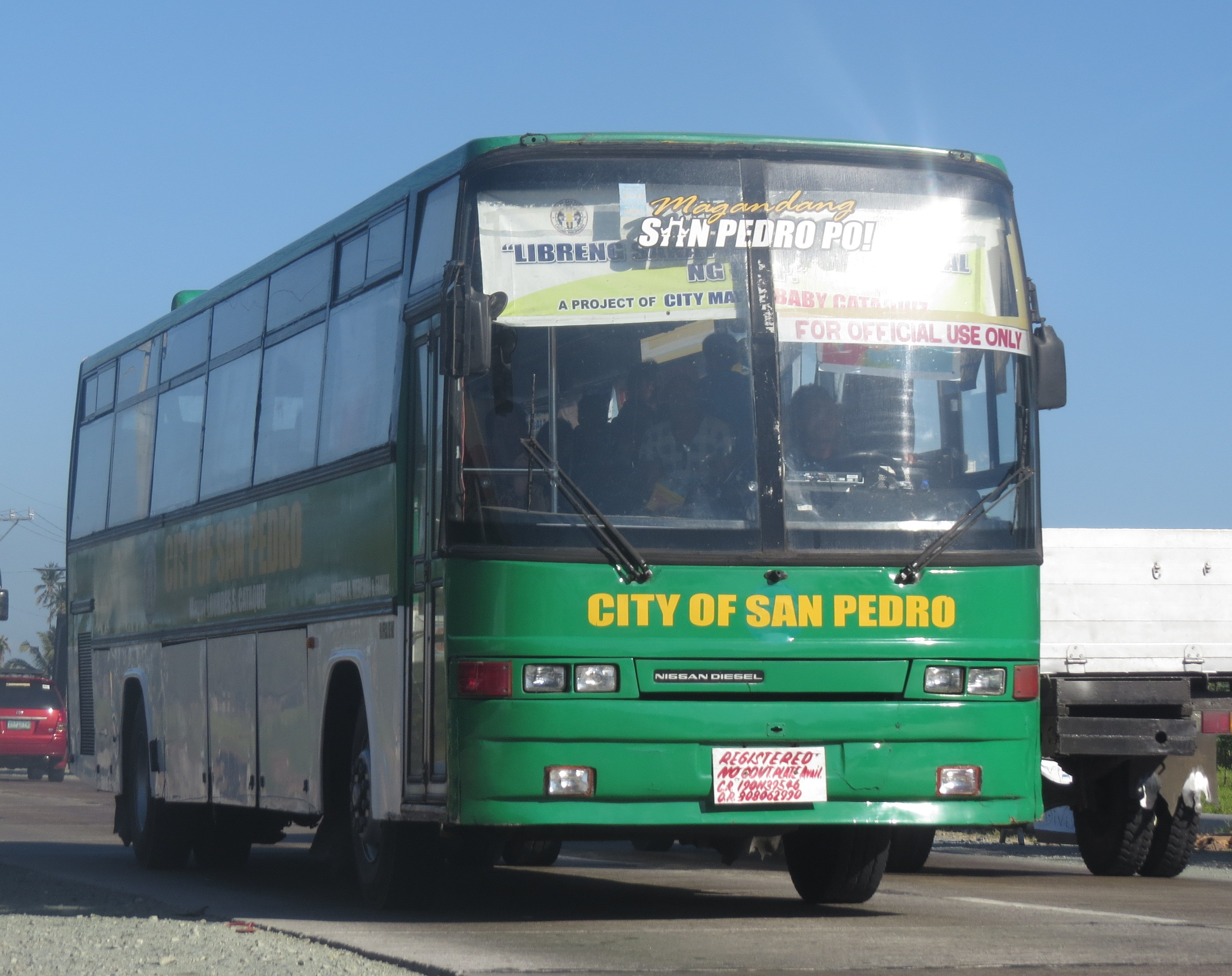
DMMW Euro Bus

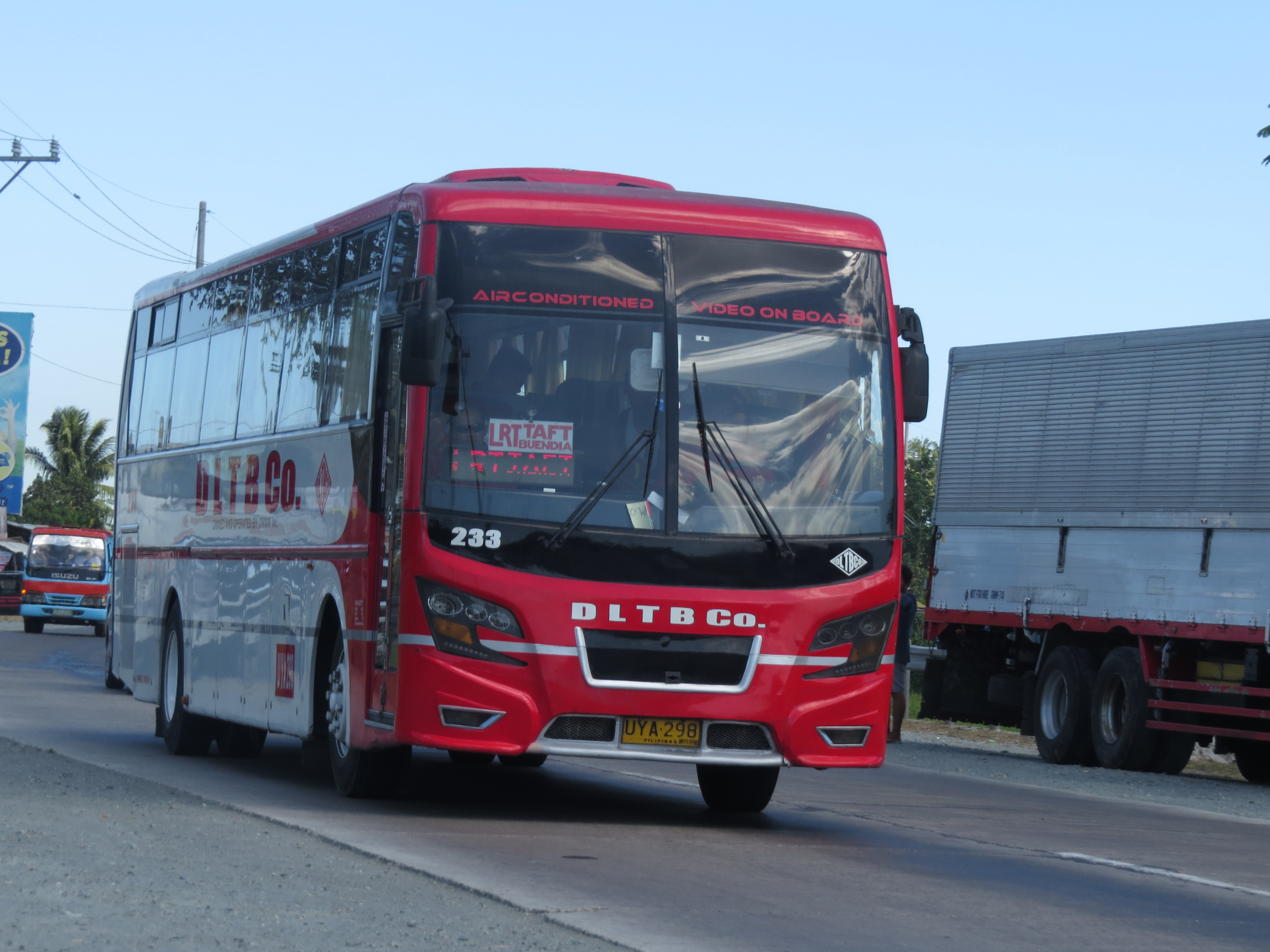
DMMW DM11 bus body in Hyundai Aero chassis

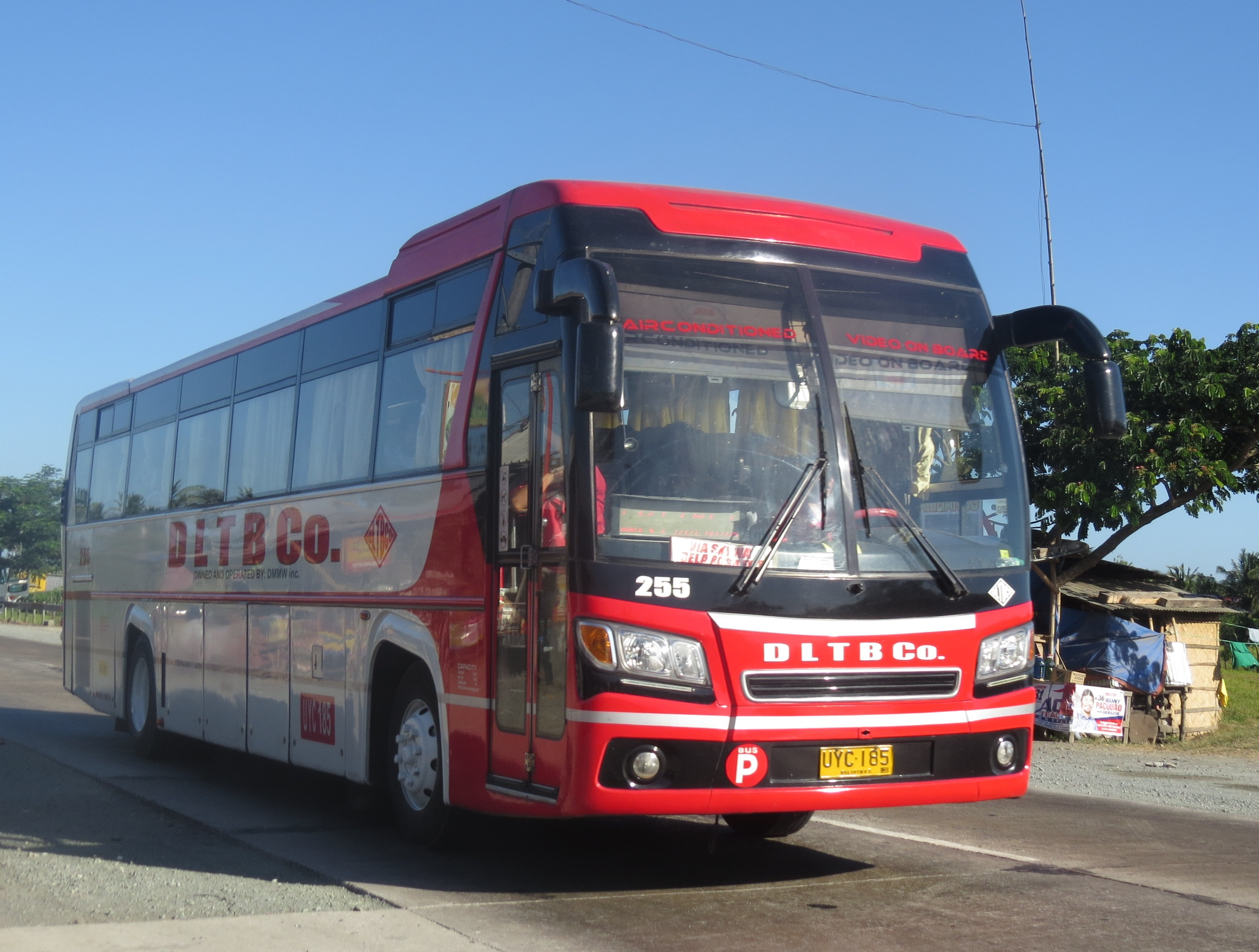
DMMW DM12 Series 1 in Hyundai Aero chassis.

- Lion's Star
- Euro Bus
- Aero Adamant - uses headlamps from a King Long XMQ6127 Euro Star
- Aero Xtreme
  - Series I – uses headlamps from a Golden Dragon XML6796
  - Series II – uses headlamps from a Yutong ZK6116D
- "DM" Series
  - DMAT – Midibus - Uses tail lamps from a 2013 Model Hyundai Super Aero City/Aero City/Unicity
  - DM09 ' - uses headlamps from a Yutong ZK6100H
  - DM10 Series
    - Series I – uses headlamps from a Hyundai Universe and LED tail lamps
    - Series II – uses headlamps and tail lamps from a 2008 model Kia Granbird
- DM11 - uses a front fascia inspired by the VDL Futura, with headlamps of a Golden Dragon Superstar
- DM12 Series
    - Series I – uses headlamps of 2008 model Kia Granbird
    - Series II – uses headlamps of a Golden Dragon Superstar
- DM14 Series

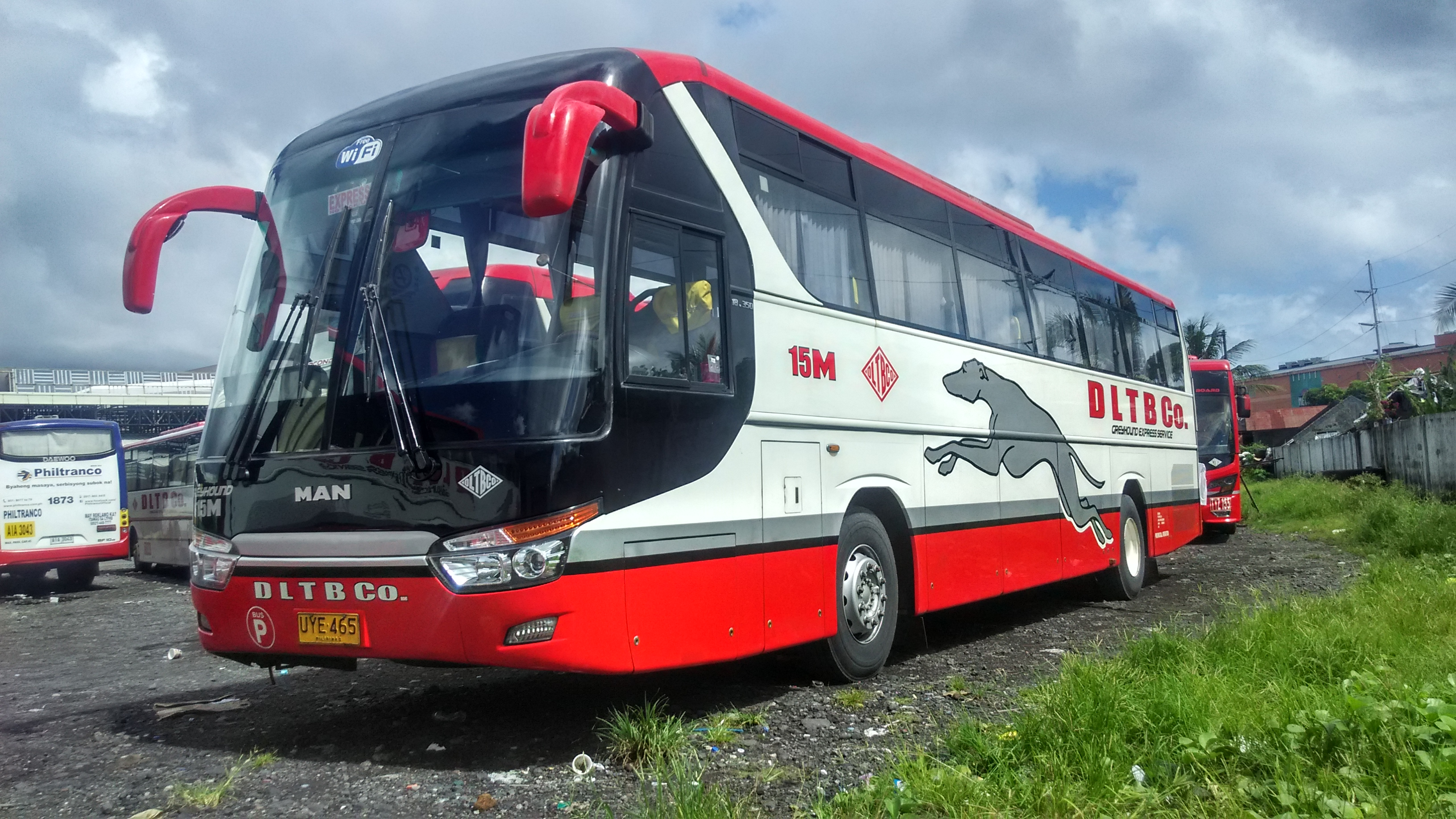
DM14 series 1 on MAN R39 18.430 HOCL chassis

    - Series I – with King Long XMQ6129Y fascia (Front and Rear) and Golden Dragon "Marcopolo" Side
    - Series II – with King Long XMQ6117Y/Y3 fascia (Front and Rear) and Golden Dragon "Marcopolo" Side
    - Series III – replica of Daewoo FX with Golden Dragon Superstar Headlamps and Hyundai Universe Tail Lamps
- DM16 series

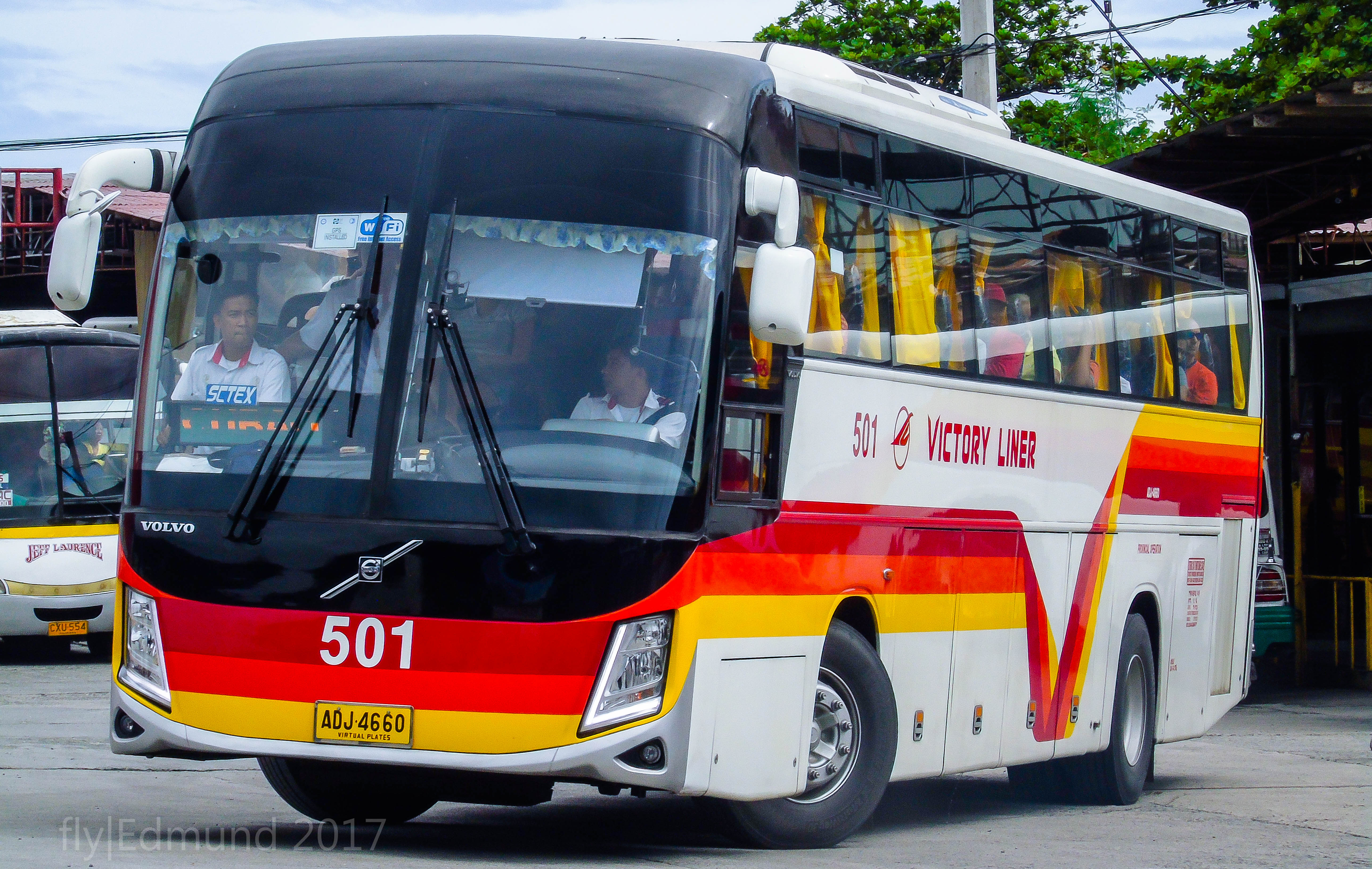
DM16 series II on Volvo B7R chassis

    - Series I – with Setra Comfort Class front fascia and King Long XMQ6112AY headlights, taillights and King Long XMQ6125AY rear fascia. Front Engined Variants incorporate the front grille from the Toyota Avanza
    - Mini Bus – with Golden Dragon Triumph headlamps and Toyota Avanza grills.
    - Series II – with Volvo 9800 front fascia.
- DM18 - uses MAN Lion's Coach (2016 model) Front Fascia
- Golden Dragon XML6127 Marcopolo Clone / Replica (exclusively custom made for GV Florida Transport & uses Daewoo, Hino, Hyundai, Kia Granbird & MAN R39 18.350 HOCL chassis)

DM22T on Scania K360IB chassis

- DM22 - Facelifted with Scania Touring
- DM23 - Facelifted with MAN Lion's Coach (2020 model). May have either King Long XMQ6112Y headlights or the stock Lion's Coach headlights
- DM24
  - Series I – inspired by MAN Lion's Coach (2020 Model) as with DM23, but uses Yutong C9/C11/C12 Headlamps
  - Series II – inspired by 2019 Hyundai Universe fascia
  - Series III - an updated DM23 model that uses OEM/stock MAN Lion's Coach/TGX headlights
  - Series IV - has a Higer KLQ6119/KLQ6123 U-Tour front Fascia (Exclusive only to GV Florida Transport)
- DM26 - Uses Zhongtong Z6 headlights with Zhongtong D12 rear facelift

== See also ==
- List of bus companies of the Philippines
