= Daewoo FX212 Super Cruiser =

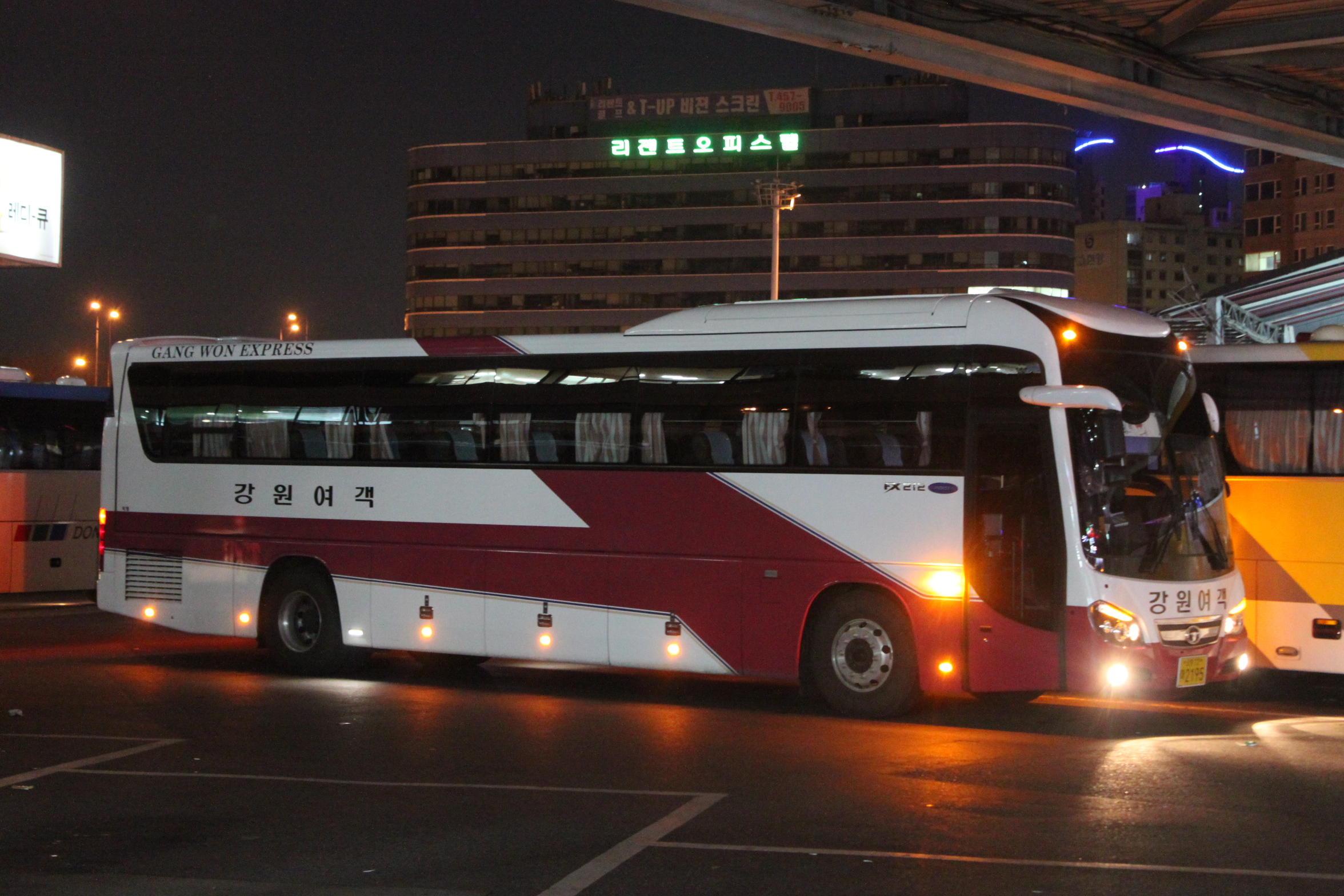

Overview
- Manufacturer: Zyle Daewoo Commercial Vehicle
- Production: 2007-present

Body and chassis
- Class: Coach (bus)
- Body style: Single-decker bus
- Layout: Rear-engine, rear-wheel-drive
- Platform: Daewoo Bus Chassis
- Doors: 1 or 2
- Floor type: Step entrance

Powertrain
- Transmission: 6-speed manual (ZF); 12-speed AMT (ZF); 5-speed automatic (Allison); 5-speed manual (Daimos/S&T)

Dimensions
- Wheelbase: 6,100mm (FX115, FX116); 6,500mm (FX120, FX212)
- Length: 11,600mm (FX115, FX116); 12,000mm (FX120, FX212)
- Width: 2,490mm
- Height: 3,350mm 3,500mm (FX212)

Chronology
- Predecessor: Daewoo BH120F

The Daewoo FX212 Super Cruiser (hangul:대우 FX212 슈퍼 크루저) (later renamed in 2017 as the Daewoo FX212 Super Star (hangul:대우 FX212 슈퍼 스타)) is a heavy-duty luxury coach manufactured by the South Korean bus producer Daewoo. It was introduced in November 2007, part of the FX series of current coaches that started with the FX115 and FX116 Cruising Arrow, and the FX120 Cruising Star. It is primarily available as luxury hi-decker tourist buses. It is assembled in Ulsan, South Korea. It is distinguishable by an 'FX212 Super Cruiser' or 'FX212 Super Star' badge, but the common Daewoo badge is usually on the rear. Principal competitors has been both the Hyundai Universe and Kia Granbird.

== Models ==
- Current models
  - FX116 Cruising Arrow
  - FX120 Cruising Star
- Discontinued models
  - FX115 Cruiser
  - FX212 Super Cruiser

== Engines ==
Model	Emissions	Type	Displacement	Power	Torque
Doosan DL08	Euro 4	I6 common rail diesel turbo	7.6L	340 PS	145 kg.m
Doosan DL08K	Euro 5	I6 common rail diesel turbo	7.6L	340 PS	145 kg.m
Doosan DL08P	Euro 6	I6 common rail diesel turbo	7.6L	340 PS	145 kg.m
Doosan DV11	Euro 4	V6 common rail diesel turbo	10.9L	400 PS	173 kg.m
Doosan DV11K	Euro 5	V6 common rail diesel turbo	10.9L	400 PS 430 PS	173 kg.m 193 kg.m
Cummins ISM	Euro 5	I6 VGT diesel turbo	10.8L	440 PS	205 kg.m
Cummins ISL	Euro 6	I6 VGT diesel turbo	8.9L	400 PS	173 kg.m
FPT Cursor 11	Euro 6	I6 common rail diesel turbo	11.1L	420 PS 480 PS	204 kg.m 229 kg.m
Doosan GL11K	Euro 4 Euro 5	I6 common rail diesel turbo	11.1L	340 PS	140 kg.m
Doosan GL11P	Euro 6	I6 common rail diesel turbo	11.1L	310 PS 340 PS	120 kg.m 140 kg.m
Doosan GX12P	Euro 6	I6 common rail diesel turbo	11.1L	400 PS	173 kg.m

== See also ==
- Daewoo FX115/FX116 Cruising Arrow
- Daewoo FX120 Cruising Star
