= Kia Granbird =

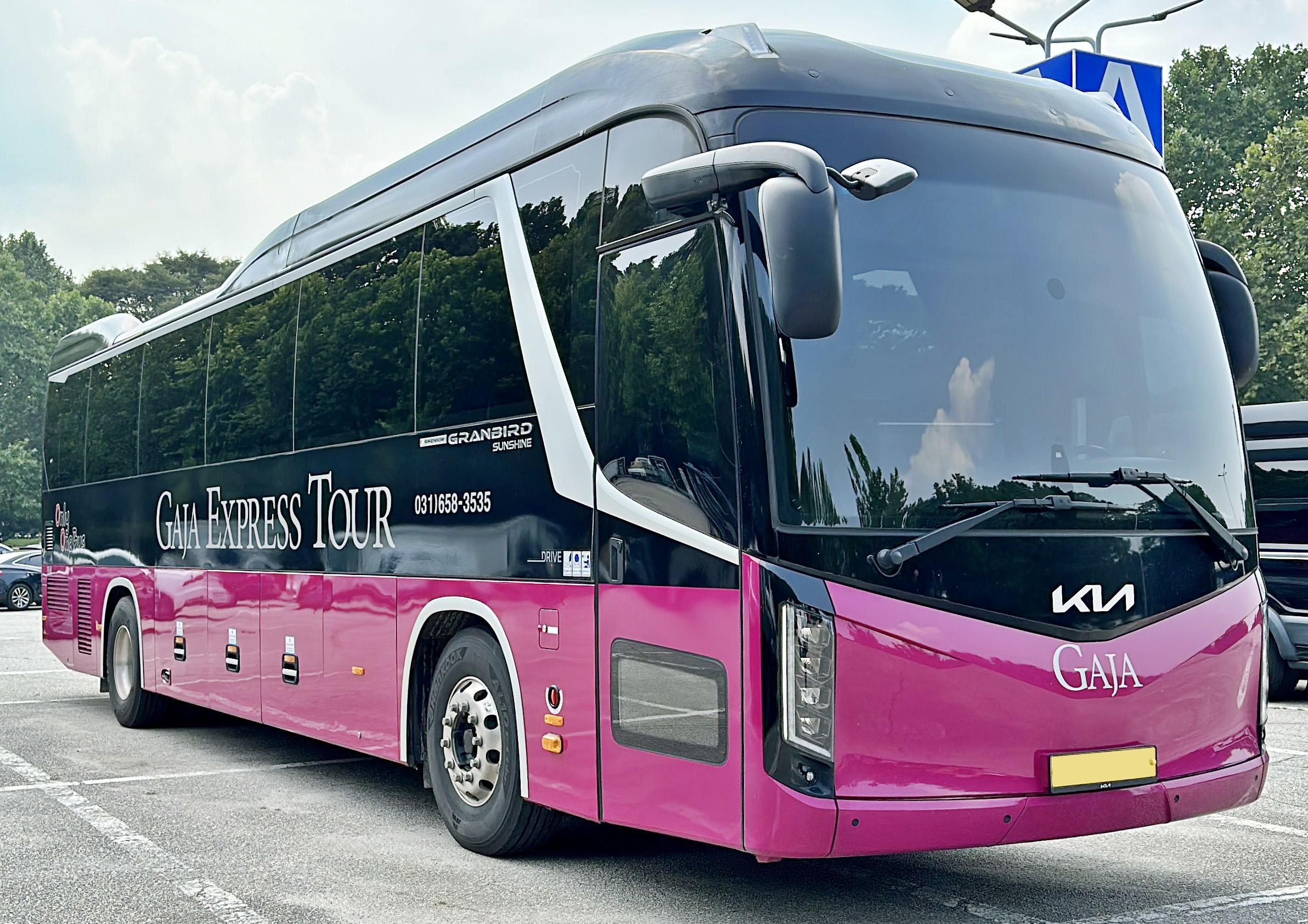

Overview
- Manufacturer: Kia
- Also called: Kia Granbird Royale; Kia Super Granbird; Kia Granbird Super Premium
- Production: 1994–2028
- Assembly: Hanam Plant, Gwangju, South Korea

Body and chassis
- Class: Commercial vehicle
- Body style: High-decker coach
- Layout: Rear-engine, rear-wheel-drive
- Doors: 1
- Floor type: Step entrance
- Related: Hyundai Universe

Powertrain
- Engine: D6AB, D6AC, D6HA, D6CA, D6CB, D6CC, D6CD, D6CG
- Transmission: 5/6-speed manual (ZF); 6-speed automatic (ZF)

Dimensions
- Wheelbase: 5,800 mm (228 in); 6,150 mm (242 in); 6,640 mm (261 in)
- Length: 11,650 mm (459 in); 12,000 mm (472 in); 12,490 mm (492 in)
- Width: 2,495 mm (98 in)
- Height: 3,435 mm (135 in); 3,555 mm (140 in)

The Kia Granbird (Korean: 기아 그랜버드) is a high-decker coach produced by the South Korean vehicle manufacturer Kia. It was derived from the Hino S'elega platform and for a brief period of time from former Asia Motors. Production started in 1994, and the exterior look stayed the same until the second generation in 2007, and then finally a refresh in 2020. The Granbird is produced at Kia's Hanam plant, and Kia's commercial and military trucks. The Granbird is only sold in selected markets.

In 1994, Kia introduced the Granbird, to compete with the Hyundai Aero and the Daewoo BH series, SsangYong Transstar. This generation was only offered with direct injection diesel engines.

== First generation ==
=== (AM948/AM949, August 1994 – November 2007) ===
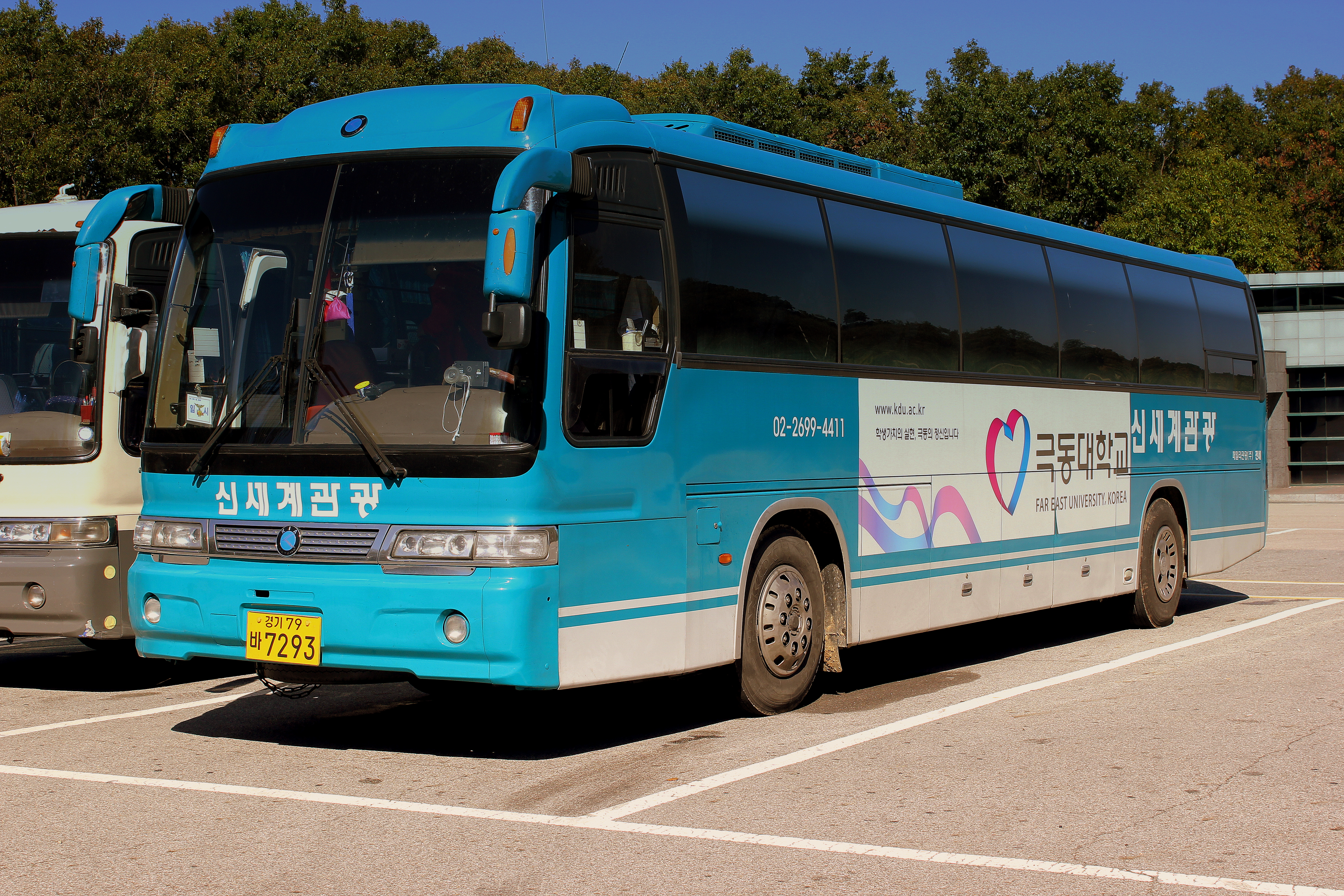
Kia Granbird 2000–2007

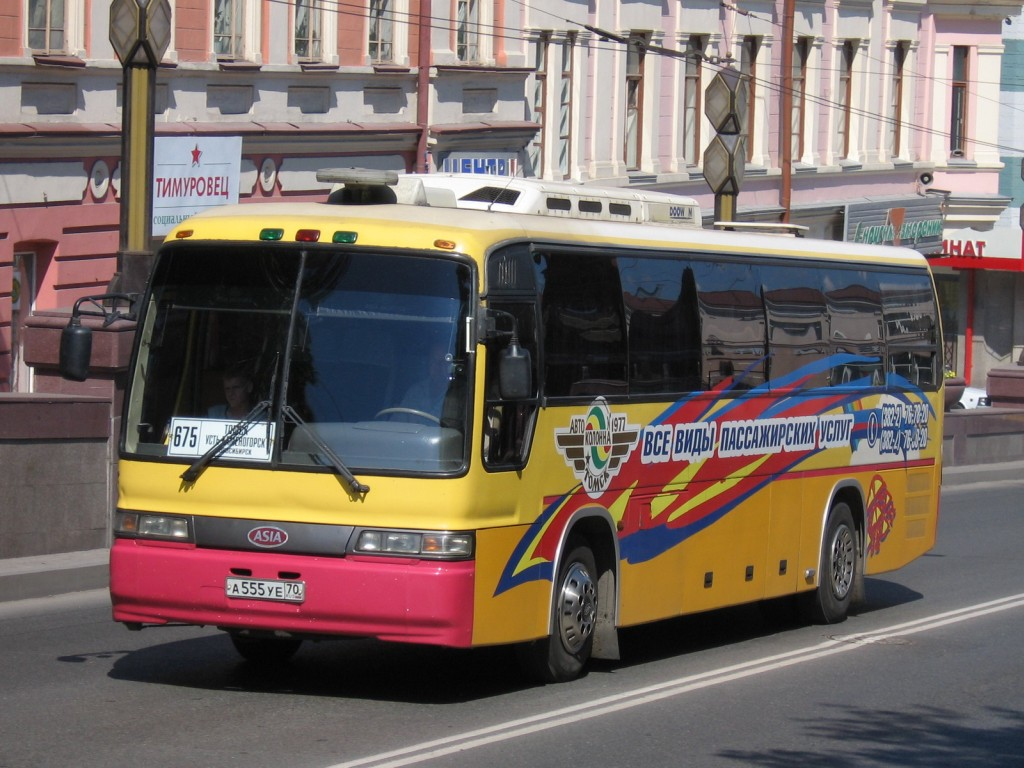
Asia Motors Granbird

Released in August 1994 during the Asia Motors era under the name Granbird AM948/AM949, this model continued production until Kia Motors was acquired by Hyundai Motor Company, after which it was renamed KM948/KM949 Granbird. It is the only independently developed model among those launched by Asia Motors and later carried over to Kia that continues to this day. The bus is produced at the Hanan Special Vehicle Plant in Gwangsan-gu, Gwangju.

Although it was based on the platform of the first-generation Hino Selega FD/FS by Hino Motors, unlike Daewoo or Hyundai buses at the time that adopted foreign technology and design, the Granbird featured an original design (except for the engine and platform). In 1995, it became the first Korean commercial vehicle to receive the Good Design Award and the Successful Design (SD) Award from the Ministry of Trade and Industry.

Until the full model change to the second-generation New Granbird on November 29, 2007, its overall design remained mostly unchanged except for minor updates to the radiator grille, fog lights, and dashboard. The Granbird is still commonly seen today. It features a rear-engine, rear-wheel-drive (RR) layout, with air suspension as standard (leaf spring suspension was not available).

Initially, it was equipped with Hino’s V8 EF750 and F17E engines. After Kia became part of the Hyundai Motor Group, the bus adopted Hyundai’s Q engines or Powertec engines (380 hp, 410 hp). The Powertec engine became an option for the Blue Sky and Sunshine models starting in 2000, later becoming standard on Greenfield and higher models. The 410 hp engine was offered as an option on all models except the Greenfield after the Q engine was discontinued in 2004.

Originally, the seats were supplied by Asia Motors, but they later switched to Hanil Interior (used by Hyundai) and Myungbo Industries (used by Daewoo Bus), with Myungbo seats as standard and Hanil seats available for an additional cost. This bus was also used during the 2002 FIFA World Cup.

The first version had a long distance between the front axle and the front door, using a boxy dashboard similar to the AM bus. A 1997 facelift shortened the distance and introduced a more streamlined dashboard.

=== Granbird Mini ===
Debuted at the 1995 Seoul Motor Show under the name New Cosmos, it was later reintroduced at the 2002 Seoul Motor Show as the Granbird Mini. However, it was never released due to manufacturer circumstances. It was a medium-class model with a length of 9 meters, similar to the BH090 Royal Star.

=== Granbird Saloon ===
Shown as a super high-decker concept at the 1995 Seoul Motor Show, but it was never sold due to market conditions. The prototype is currently abandoned at the Gwangju plant.

=== Granbird City ===
An 11.5-meter model produced experimentally in 1997 for express seat bus service, based on the Granbird Greenfield. It competed with the Aero Space LS and BH115H Royal Express at the time. Air suspension was standard, with underfloor luggage compartments and swing doors, but panoramic glass was not available. It lacked AV systems, luggage racks, and reclining seats, making it a low-cost economy model.

Powered by a Hino V8 EF750 engine, it had poor fuel efficiency compared to competitors, so few city bus companies adopted it. In South Korea, only Hannam Transportation in Seoul operated about ten units on routes 50, 51, 129, and 129-1. The model was soon discontinued, and its successor was the New Granbird Multi, based on the Granbird Blue Sky.

== Variants ==
=== Granbird SD-1 "Greenfield" ===
Released in August 1997, this was an 11.5-meter standard deck entry-level model. It was mainly purchased by intercity bus companies. In 2004, it was upgraded to the Granbird SD1 Super Greenfield. A total of 299 units were produced.

=== Granbird SD-1 "Super Greenfield" ===
Also an 11.5-meter standard deck entry-level model, primarily used by intercity bus operators. In some areas, such as Gyeongju, North Gyeongsang Province, it was also operated as a city bus.

=== Granbird SD-II "Parkway" ===
Introduced during the 1997 facelift, this was a 12-meter standard deck model. It was produced in greater numbers than competing models. The Powertec engine was standard, and most intercity and tour buses companies ordered it. In 2002, it was upgraded to the Granbird SD2 Super Parkway.

=== Granbird SD-II "Super Parkway" ===
A 12-meter standard deck model, widely purchased by airport buses, intercity buses, and tour bus companies.

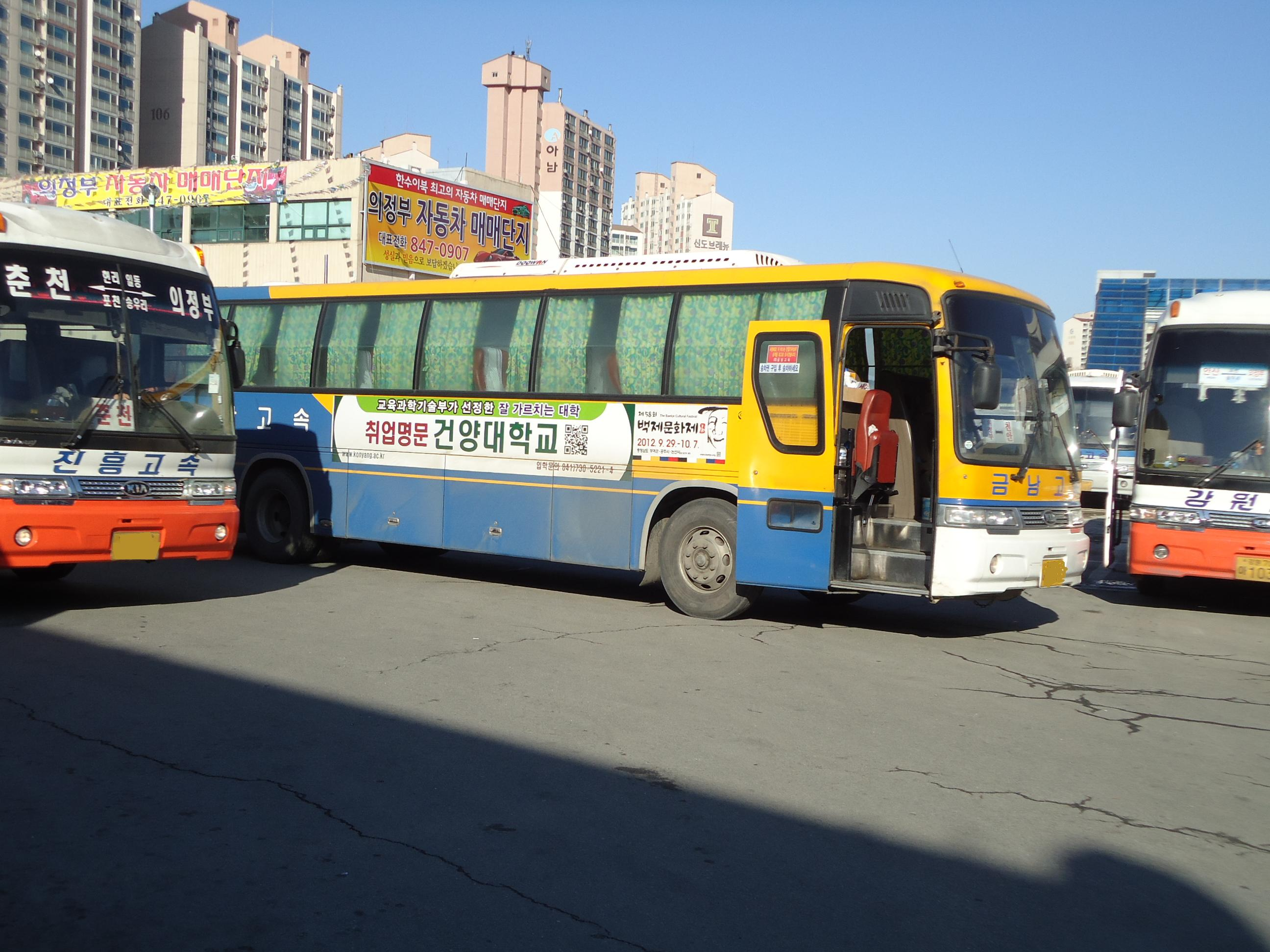
Kia Granbird SD-I Greenfield

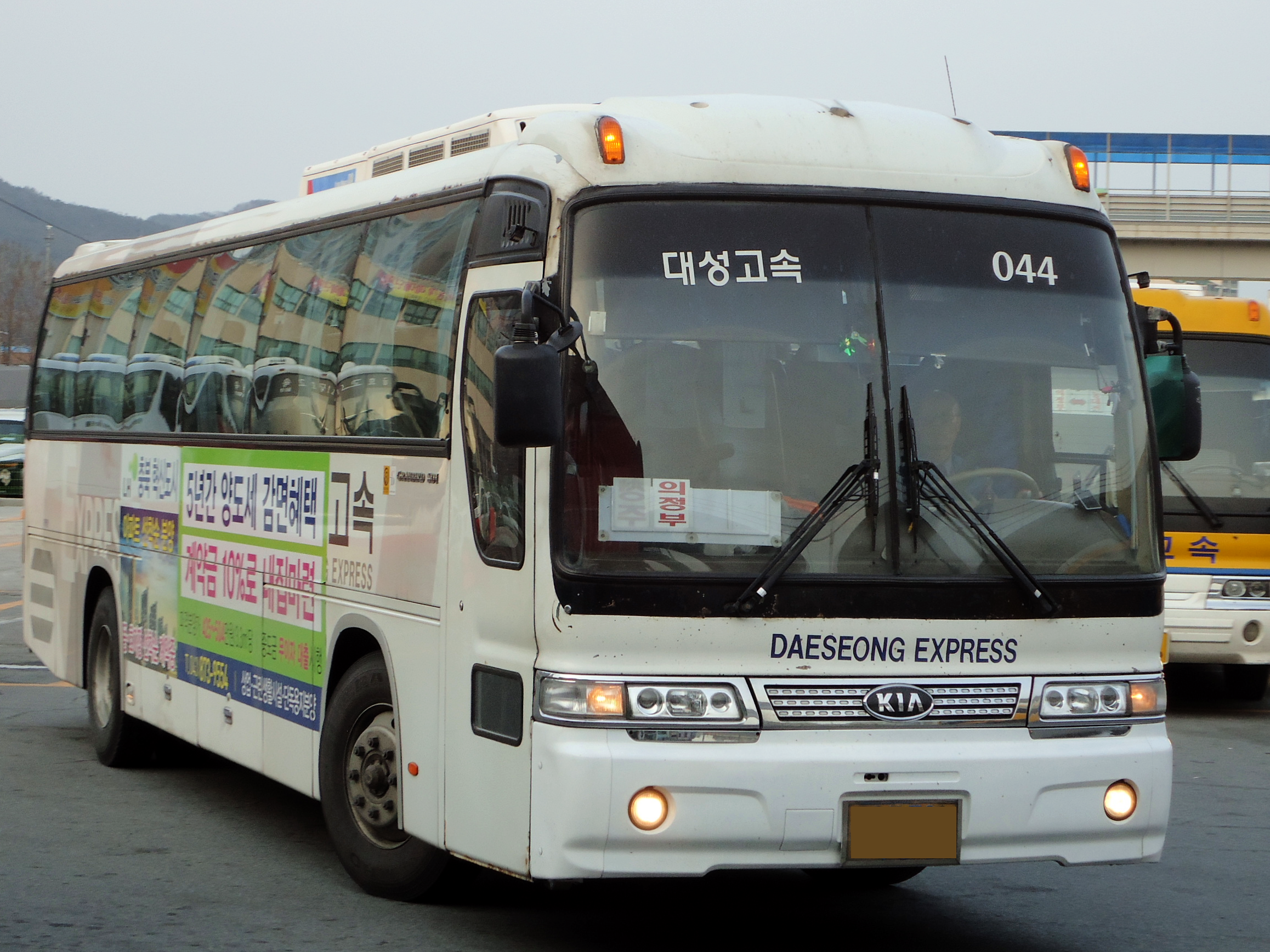
Kia Granbird SD-I Super Greenfield

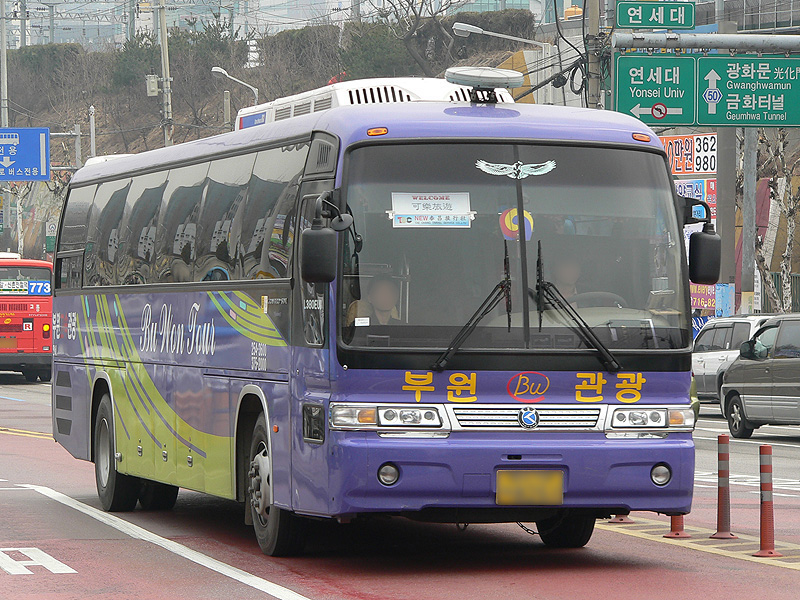
Kia Granbird SD-II Parkway

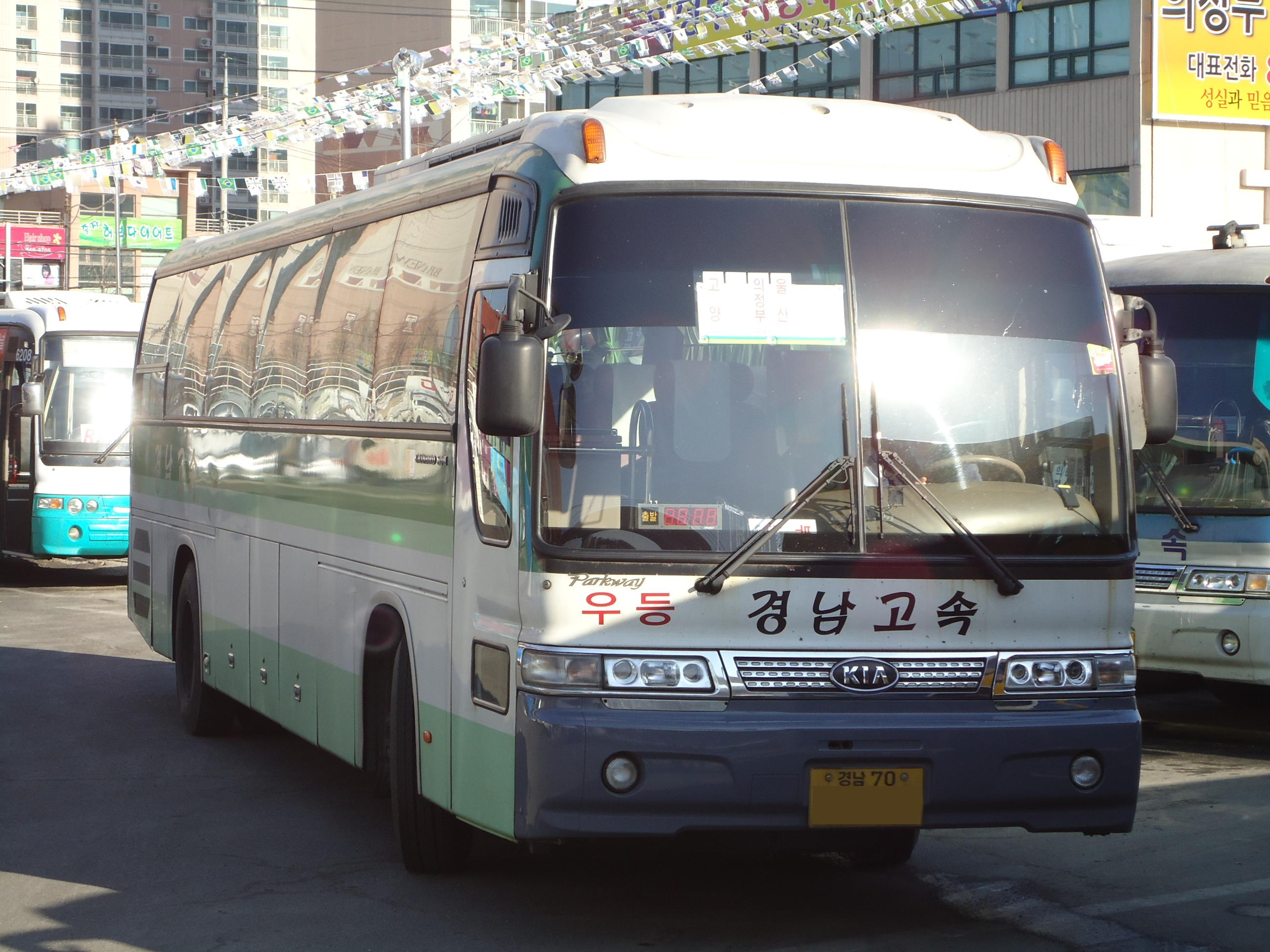
Kia Granbird SD-II Super Parkway

=== Granbird HD "Mild Breeze / Blue Sky / Sunshine" ===
This was a 12-meter high-deck model available in three versions:

Mild Breeze – for private use and tour buses

Bluesky – for standard express service

Sunshine – for premium express service

Later, both standard and premium versions were integrated into the Granbird Super Premium Sunshine series. The Blue Sky model was later facelifted and reintroduced as a 12.5-meter standard deck version.

=== Granbird Super Premium "Sunshine" ===
A 12-meter high-deck version of the Sunshine, it been popular used by almost all express and tourist bus companies. After a full model change to the New Granbird Sunshine, the name "Super Premium" was reintroduced 13 years later with the third-generation Granbird, which again carried the name Granbird Super Premium Sunshine.

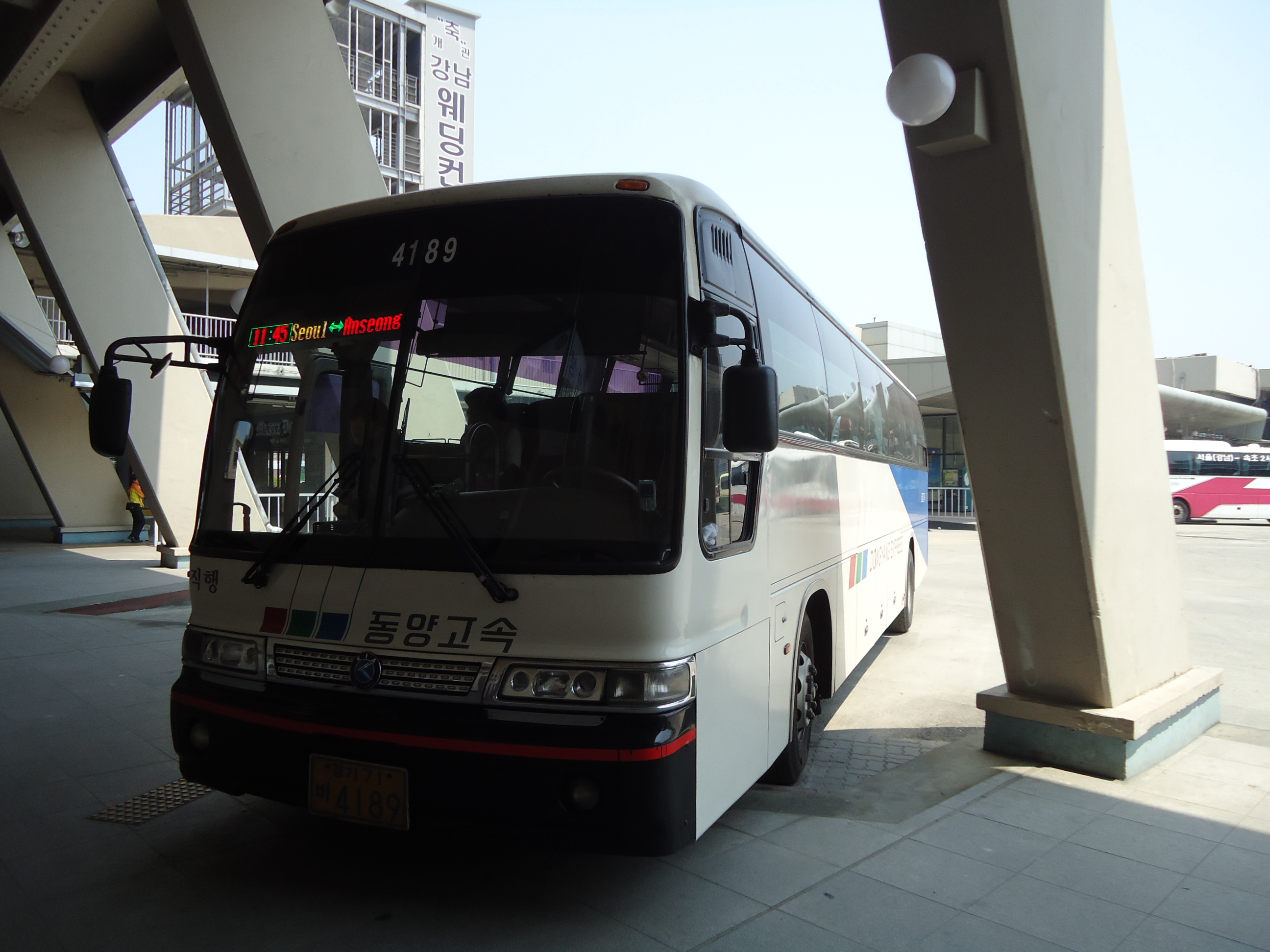
Kia Granbird HD Bluesky

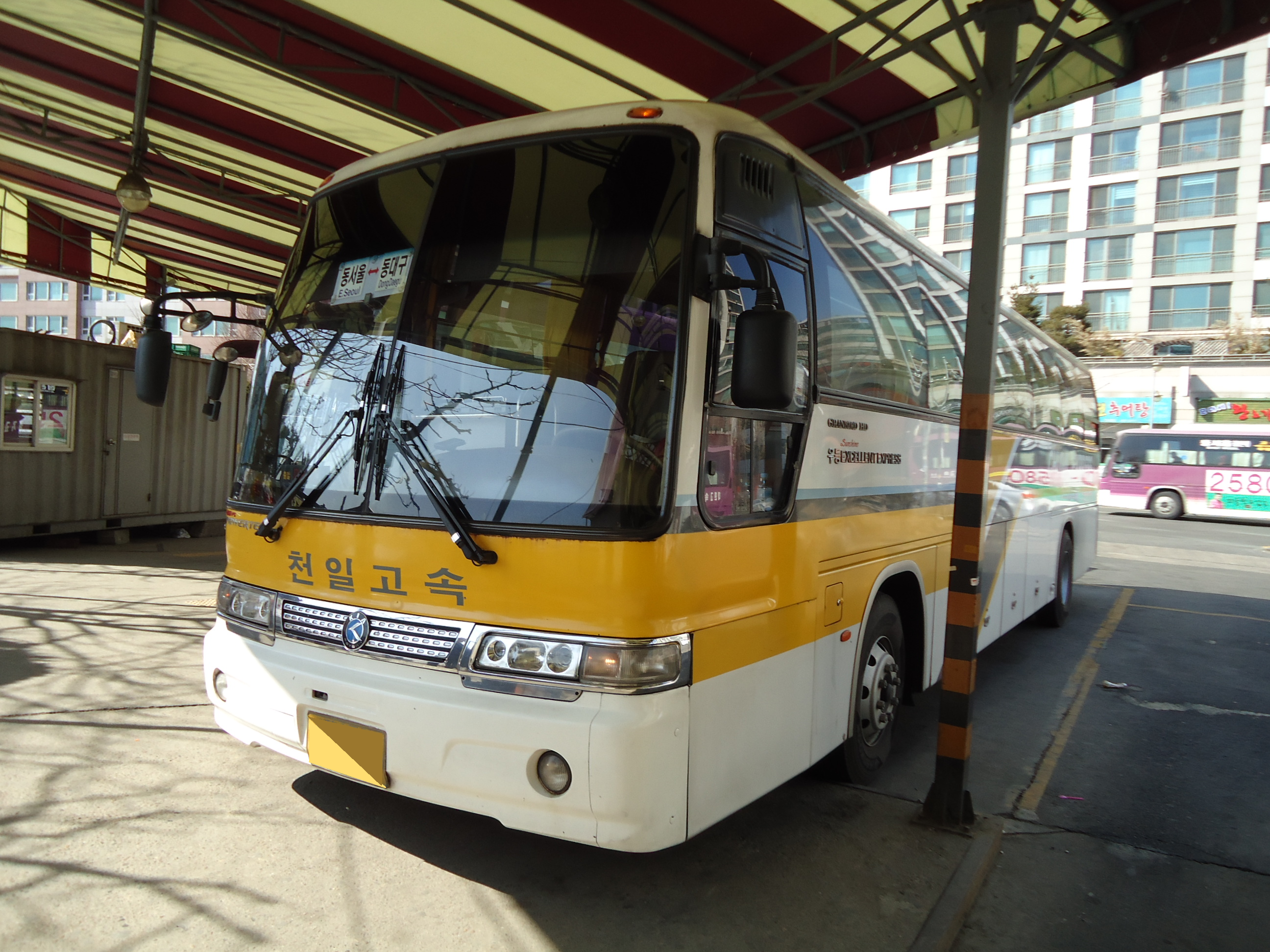
Kia Granbird HD Sunshine

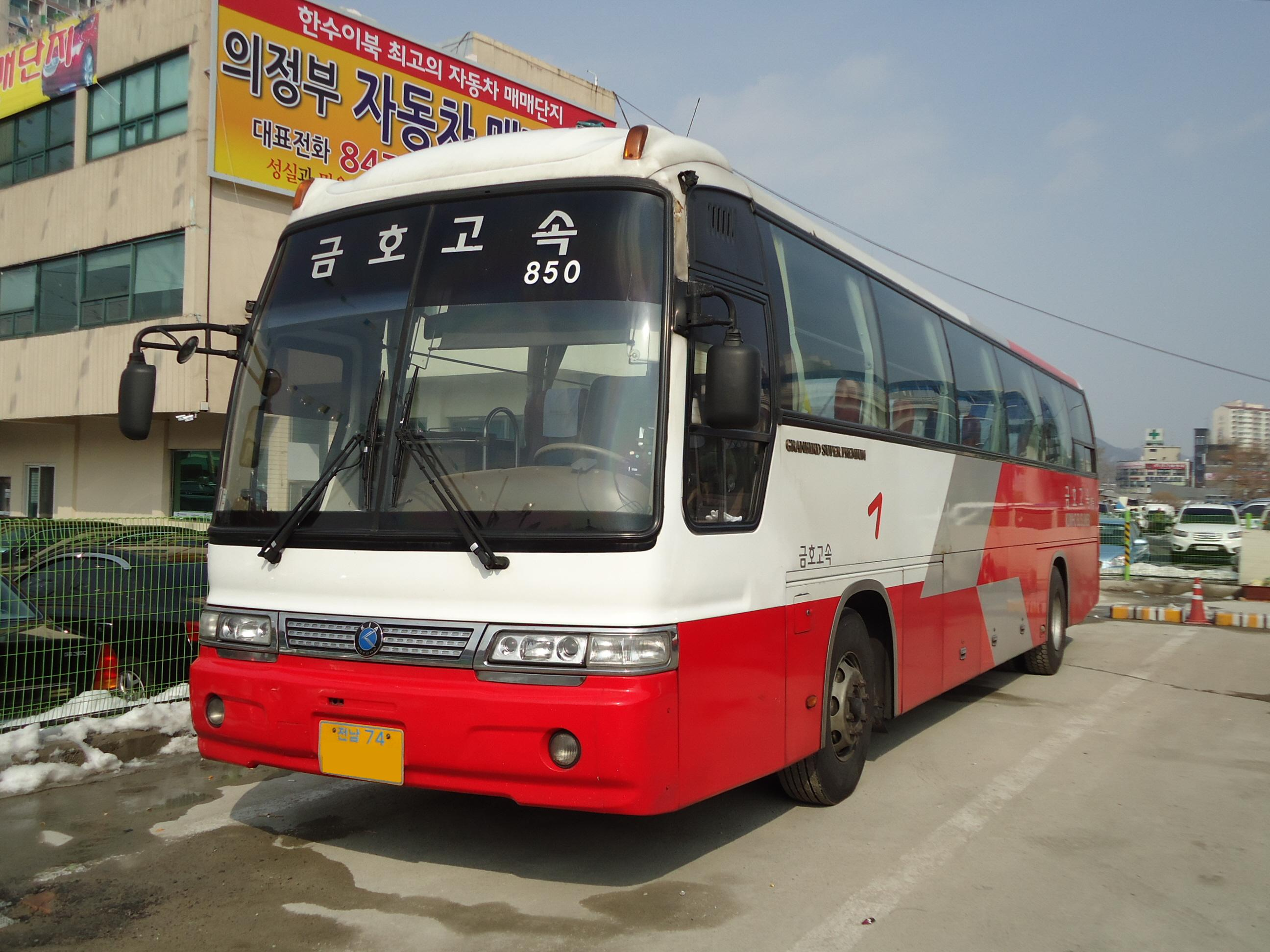
Kia Granbird Super Premium Sunshine

== Second generation (2007–2020) ==
In 2007, the second-generation Granbird was introduced with the Parkway model. The Granbird and the Hyundai Universe shared a dedicated commercial vehicle chassis. It underwent a first refresh in 2011. The second refresh of the Granbird, the Silkroad model, debuted at the Seoul Motor Show in 2015.

The previously used 410-horsepower Q engine was replaced with the H engine, increasing power to 425 horsepower. For the transmission, buyers could choose between Hyundai Dymos' 5-speed manual/1-speed reverse or ZF's 6-speed manual/1-speed reverse. Unlike the Daewoo FX or the Hyundai Universe, it was initially not available with an automatic transmission. However, with the release of the Euro 6 model in 2015, an automatic transmission became an optional feature.

Seats installed in the vehicle could be chosen between Hanil Interior seats used by Hyundai and Myungbo seats used by Daewoo Bus. The standard seats were Myungbo, but Hanil seats could be installed for an additional fee during initial import.

In 2010, a facelift model called New Granbird Innovation was unveiled and officially launched on September 20 of the same year. Only the exterior of the HD grade was changed, while the interiors of both SD and HD grades were redesigned.

Starting from July 2012, the cassette player was replaced with a CD audio system, the front garnish and main door system were improved, and ELR seatbelts for all passenger seats plus a door buzzer were added. These updates led to the release of the 2013 New Granbird Innovation.

With the stricter Euro 6 emission regulations in December 2014 and 2015, the engine was changed to the H430 Powertech 440PS, an AdBlue (urea) tank was added, side marker lamps were installed, and the vehicle received major exterior (LED fog lamps, LED DRLs) and interior updates. A reversing warning sound was also added.

In 2017, AEBS (Autonomous Emergency Braking System) and LDWS (Lane Departure Warning System) were introduced. From 2019, three-point seat belts were applied to deluxe seats. The ZF Astronic 12-speed AMT, which was previously an option only for the H engine, was discontinued, and a ZF Ecolife 6-speed automatic transmission was newly offered. This 6-speed automatic used button-type controls and was compatible with all engines.

The model was discontinued in July 2020 following the release of the fully redesigned Granbird Super Premium.

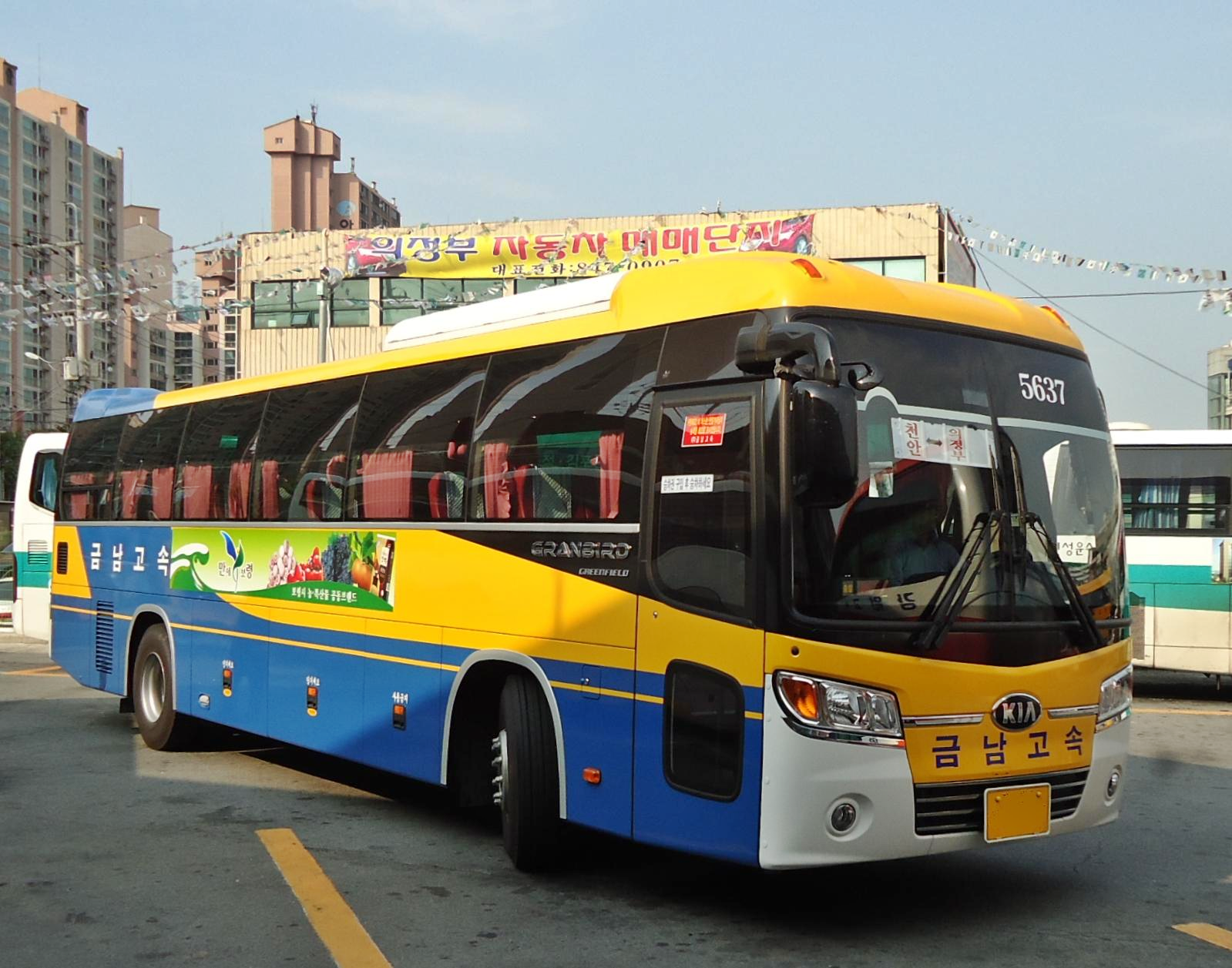
Kia Granbird Greenfield (Pre-Facelift)

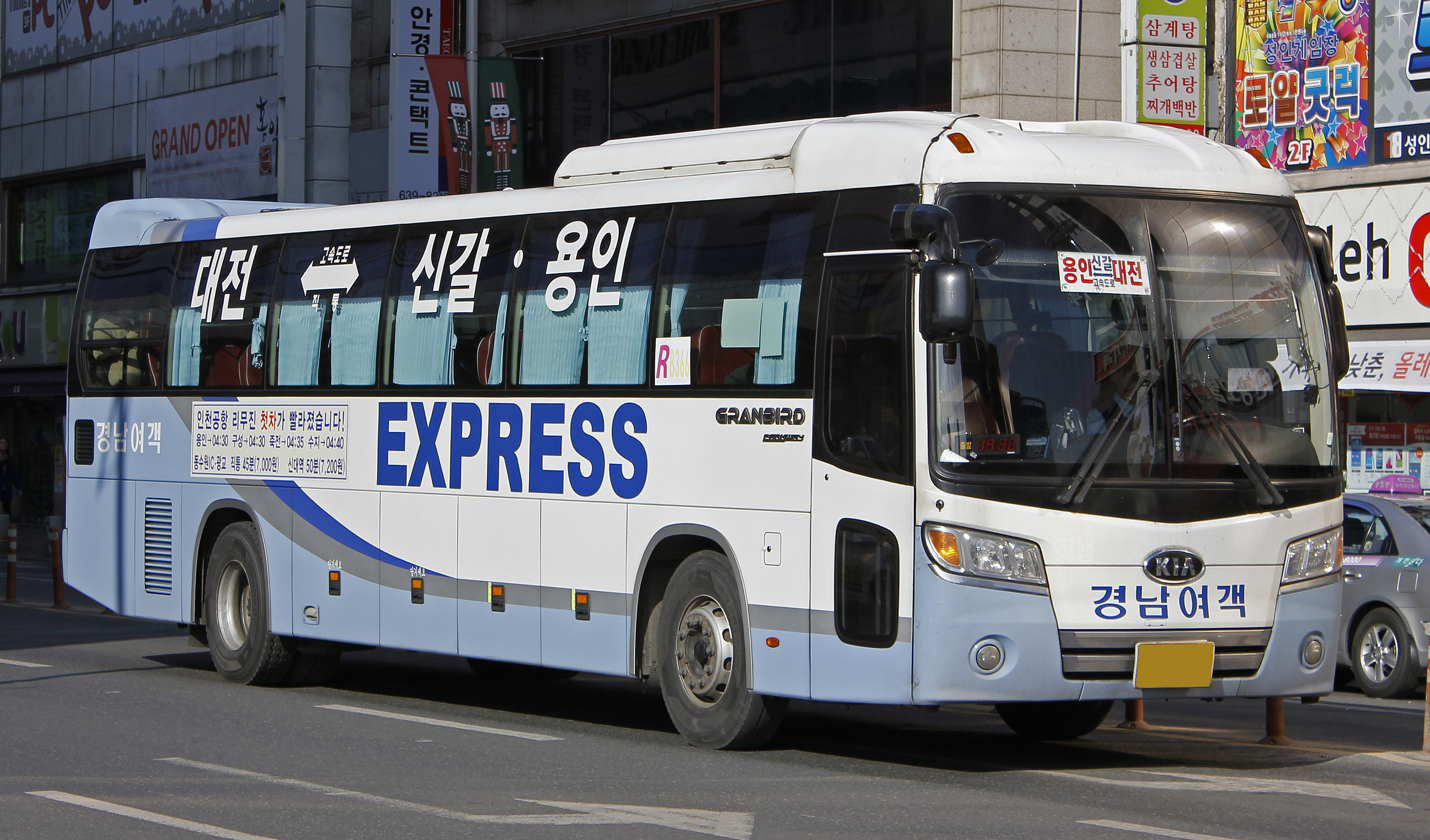
Kia Granbird Parkway Pre-facelift

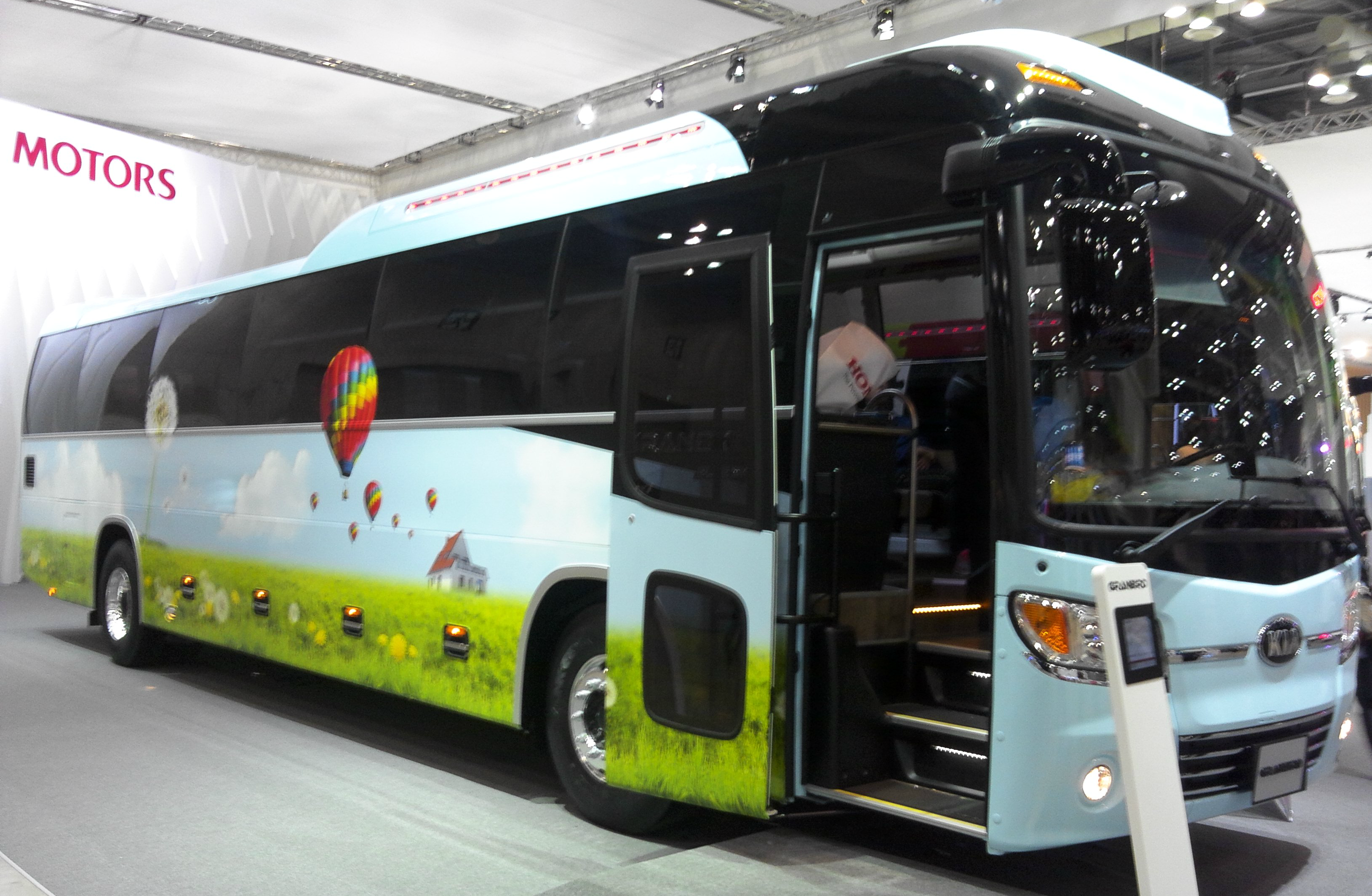
Kia Granbird Bluesky (Pre-Facelift)

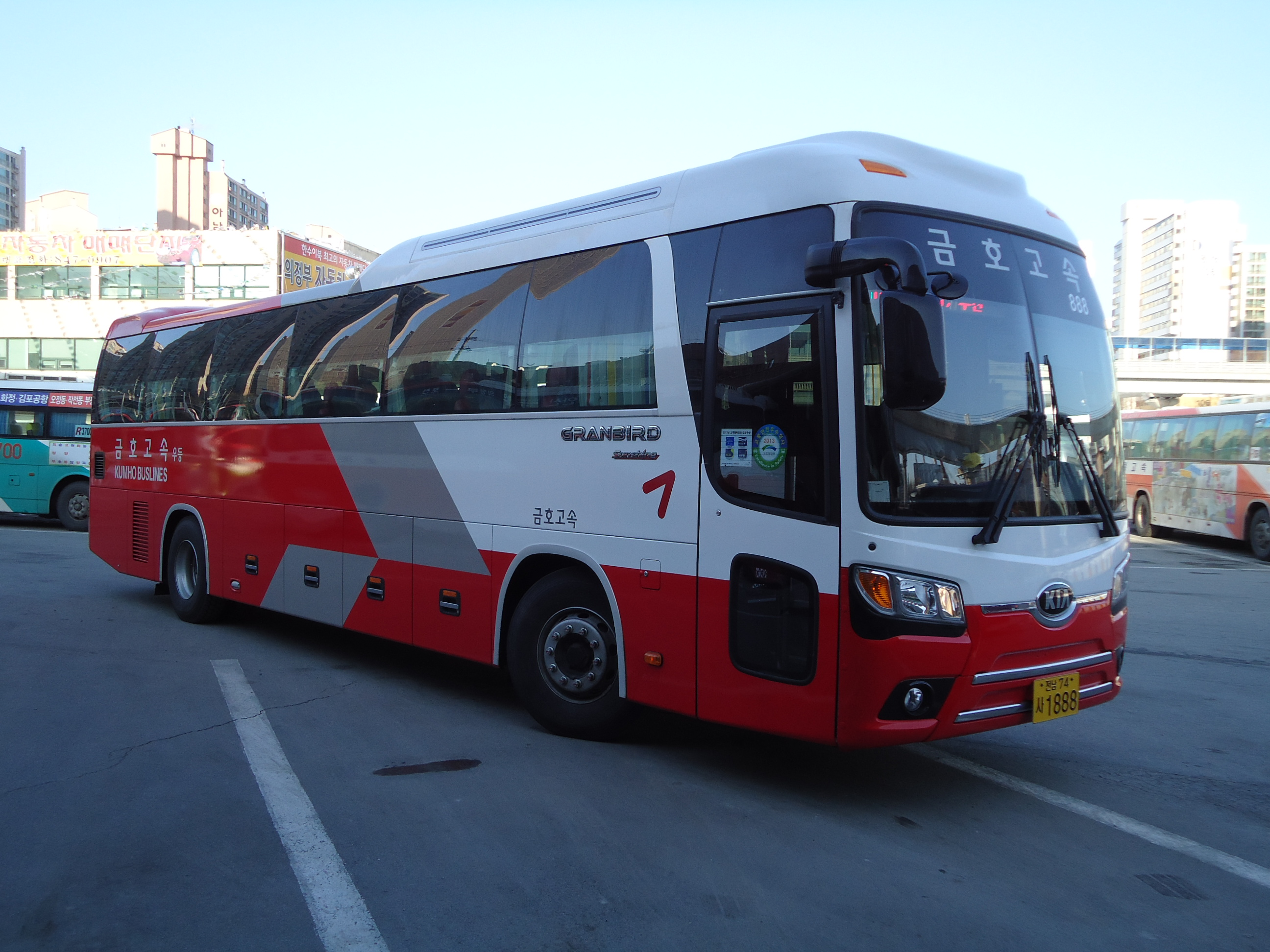
Kia Granbird Sunshine (Pre-Facelift

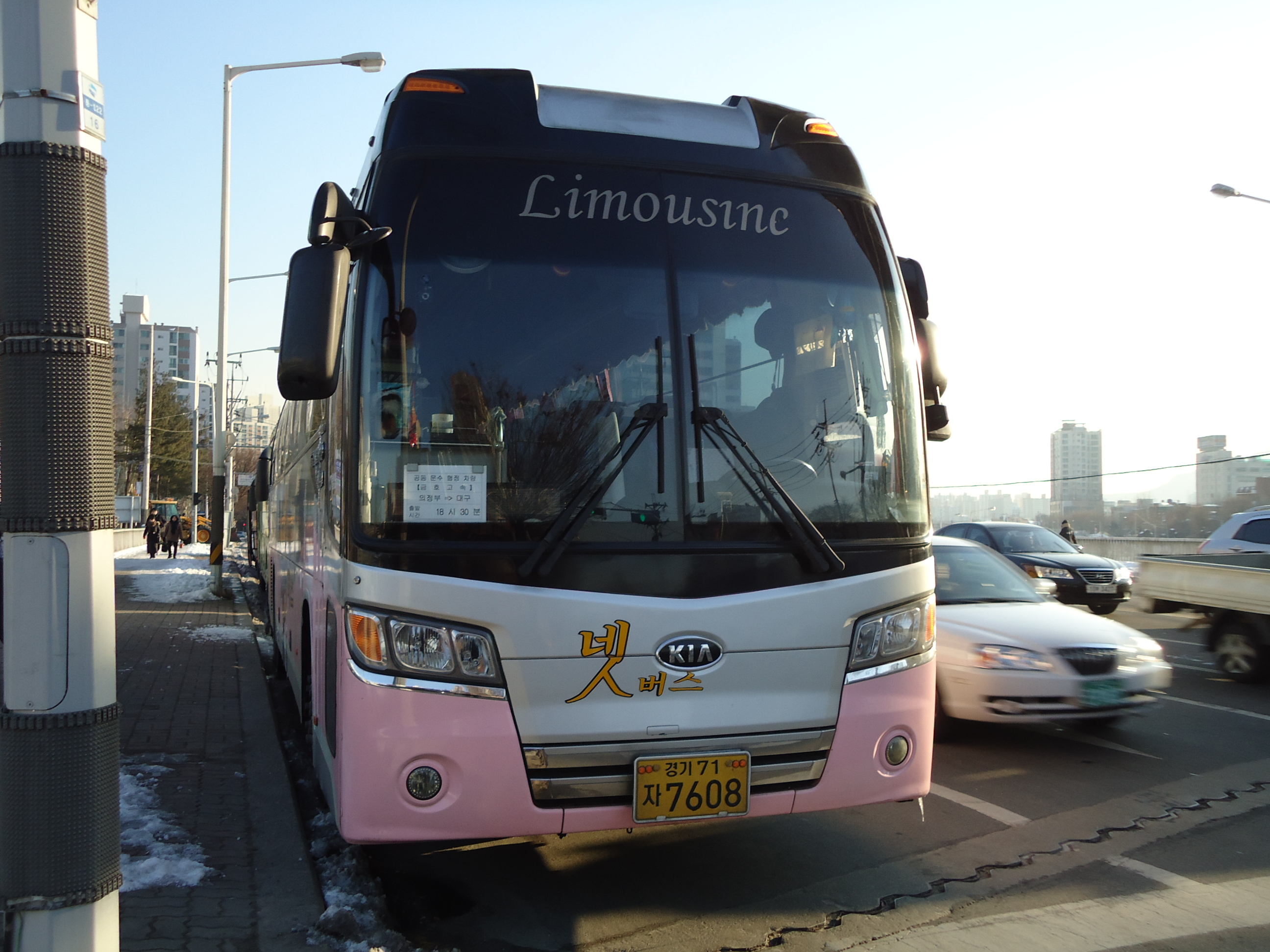
Kia Granbird Silkroad (Pre-Facelift)

=== New Granbird "Greenfield" ===
The Kia New Granbird Greenfield is the lowest-grade standard-deck model. When the New Granbird was introduced in November 2007, the Super Greenfield was upgraded to the New Granbird Greenfield. In 2010, minor changes were made to the driver's seat, and in July 2012, chrome garnish was added.

Few companies imported this model, and from December 2013, it became available only as a custom order. To comply with the Euro 6 emission standards, in December 2014 and 2015, the engine was upgraded to the H430 Powertech 440PS, an AdBlue tank was added, and both the exterior and interior underwent major updates. The updated 2015 version was released with these changes.

=== New Granbird "Parkway" ===
The Kia New Granbird Parkway (early and late versions) is a 12-meter standard-deck model. When the New Granbird was introduced in 2007, the Super Parkway was upgraded to the New Granbird Parkway. Most tour bus and intercity bus companies imported the New Granbird Parkway.

In 2010, minor changes were made to the driver's seat, and in July 2012, chrome garnish was added. To prepare for Euro 6 regulations, in December 2014 and 2015, the engine was changed to the H430 Powertech 440PS, an AdBlue tank was added, and both exterior and interior were significantly updated. The revised 2015 model was released with these improvements.

=== New Granbird "Blue Sky" ===
The Kia New Granbird Blue Sky (early version) is a 12.5-meter standard-deck model released in 2009. Before the facelift, the "Blue Sky" name referred to a 12-meter high-deck 41/45-seat express bus model.

In 2010, minor changes were made to the driver’s seat and other parts, and in July 2012, chrome garnish was added. Due to its high price, it was not widely adopted.

In December 2014 and 2015, in preparation for the stricter Euro 6 emission regulations, the engine was upgraded to the H430 Powertech 440PS engine, an AdBlue (urea solution) tank was added, side marker lamps were applied, and both the exterior and interior were significantly redesigned for the 2015 model year.

In November 2015, a metropolitan bus version called Multi was released.

=== New Granbird "Sunshine" ===
The Kia New Granbird Sunshine (mid- and late-version) is a 12-meter high-deck model. In November 2007, when the Granbird was updated to the "New Granbird," the former Super Premium model was renamed to Sunshine. In 2010, minor modifications were made, including a redesigned front lamp and the addition of a black shadow panel beneath the rear window.

The Sunshine became more popular than the Silk Road model in the Express bus services.

In December 2014 and 2015, in preparation for the stricter Euro 6 emissions regulations, the engine was upgraded to the H430 Powertech 440PS, an AdBlue (urea solution) tank was added, side marker lamps were applied, and the exterior and interior were extensively redesigned for the 2015 model.

In January 2019, a premium specification was introduced. Later in 2019, Dongyang Express became the first to introduce the Sunshine equipped with a ZF Ecolife 6-speed automatic transmission.

=== New Granbird "Silkroad" ===
The Kia New Granbird Silk Road (early, mid, and late versions) is South Korea’s first long-wheelbase high-deck model with an overall length of 12.49 meters, introduced in November 2007 during the full model change of the Granbird. While the official website lists it as 12.5 meters, its actual length is 12.49 meters.

In 2010, minor updates were made, including a redesigned front lamp and the addition of a black shadow panel beneath the rear window. The Silk Road became popular mainly as a tourist bus and company commuter vehicle.

In December 2014 and 2015, to meet the stricter Euro 6 emissions standards, the engine was upgraded to the H430 Powertech 440PS, an AdBlue (urea solution) tank was added, side marker lamps were installed, and both the exterior and interior were extensively redesigned for the 2015 model year.

Although it is also available for express and intercity bus use nationwide, its high price led many operators to opt for alternative models such as the Parkway, Sunshine, and 2nd generation Blue Sky. Even after the facelift of the Granbird, the model trims remained the same, with the Sunshine trim being released for first-class express buses.

In 2017, a premium express bus model based on the Silk Road was introduced. Officially named simply Silk Road, it is also referred to as the Premium Gold Express. However, the launch was delayed to February 2017 due to the discovery of an electrical overload defect in November 2016, just before its scheduled premium express bus service.

The Silk Road Premium officially began sales on February 23, 2017, starting with deliveries to charter bus companies.

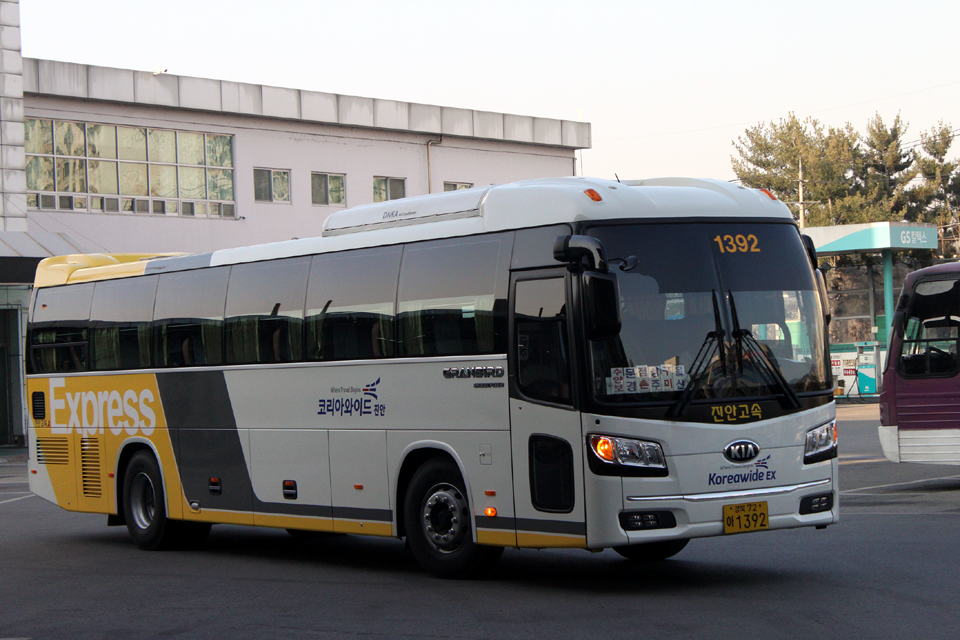
Kia New Granbird Greenfield (Facelift)

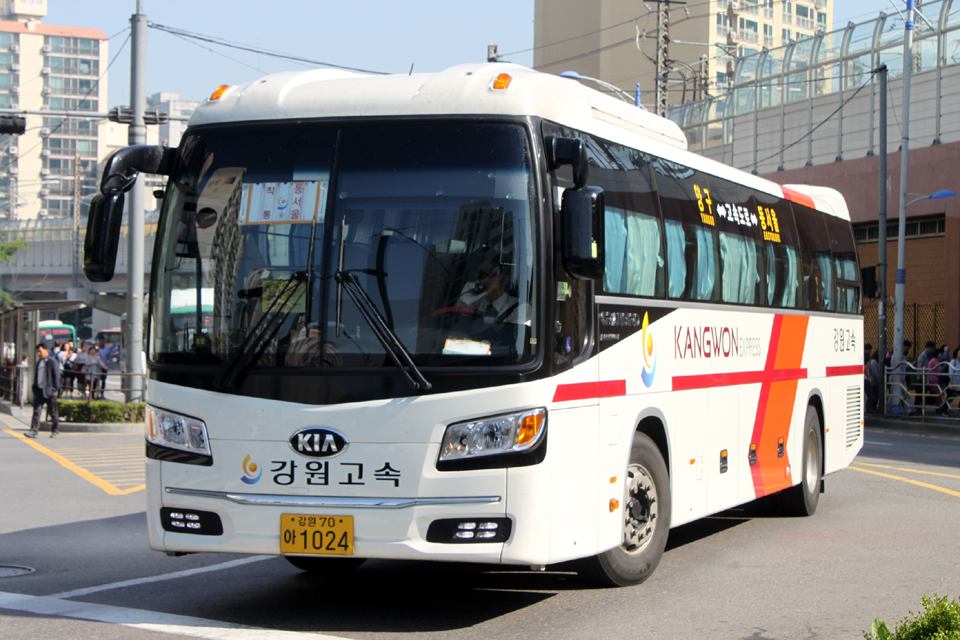
Kia New Granbird Parkway (Facelift)

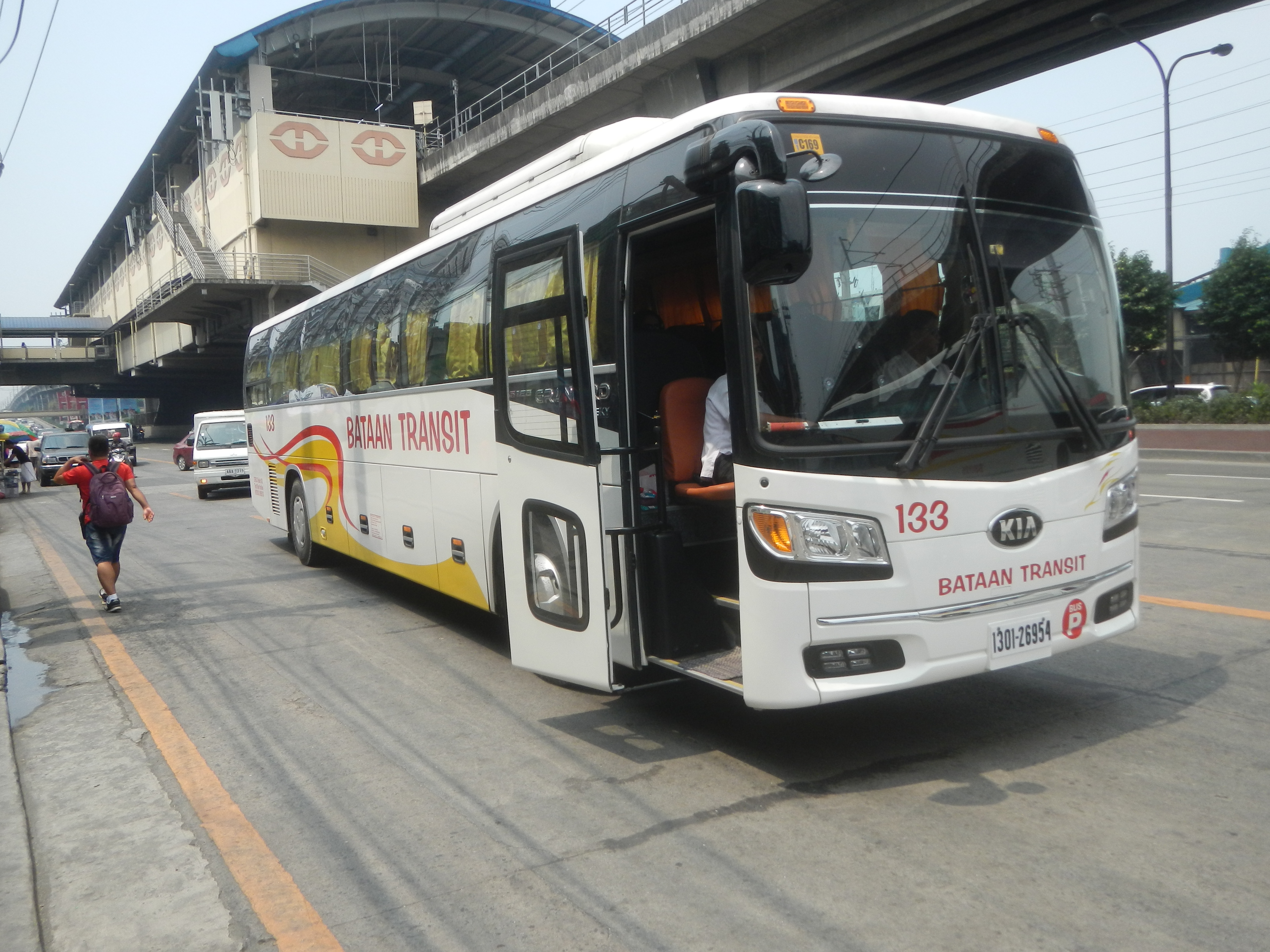
Kia Granbird Bluesky (Facelift)

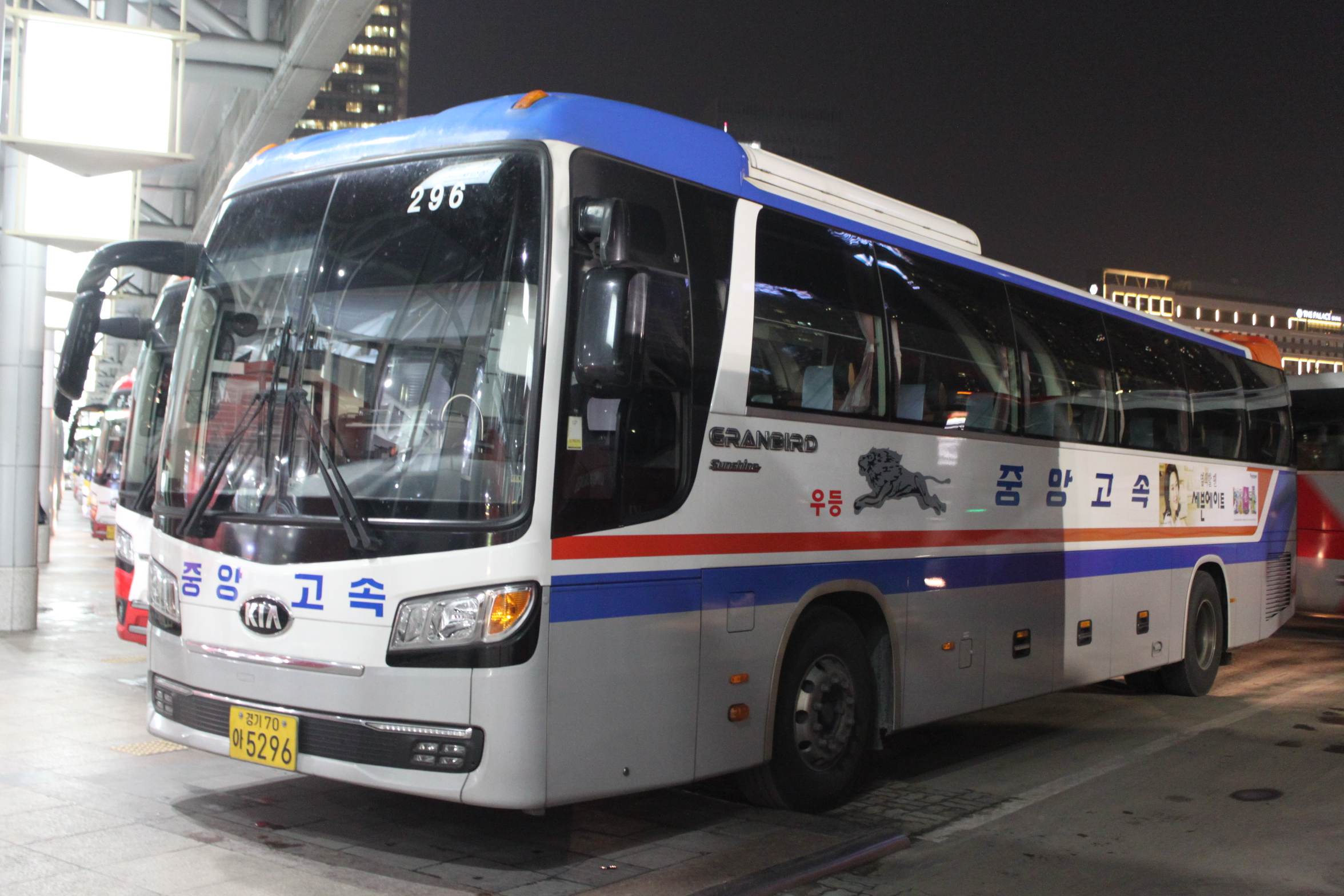
Kia Granbird Sunshine (Facelift)

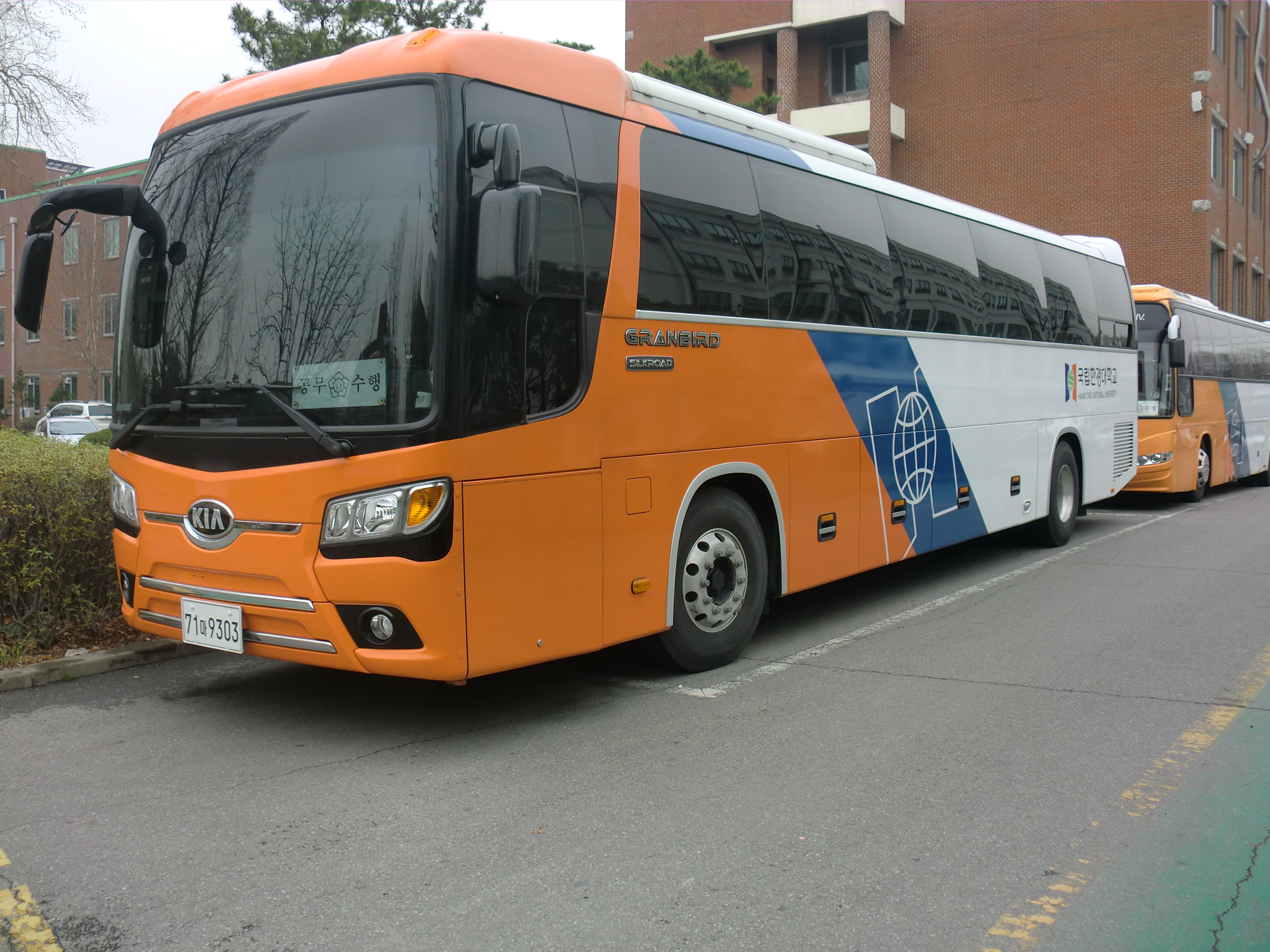
Kia Granbird Silkroad (Facelift)

=== Model name ===
- Silkroad
- Sunshine
- Bluesky
- Parkway
- Greenfield

== Third generation (2020–2028) ==
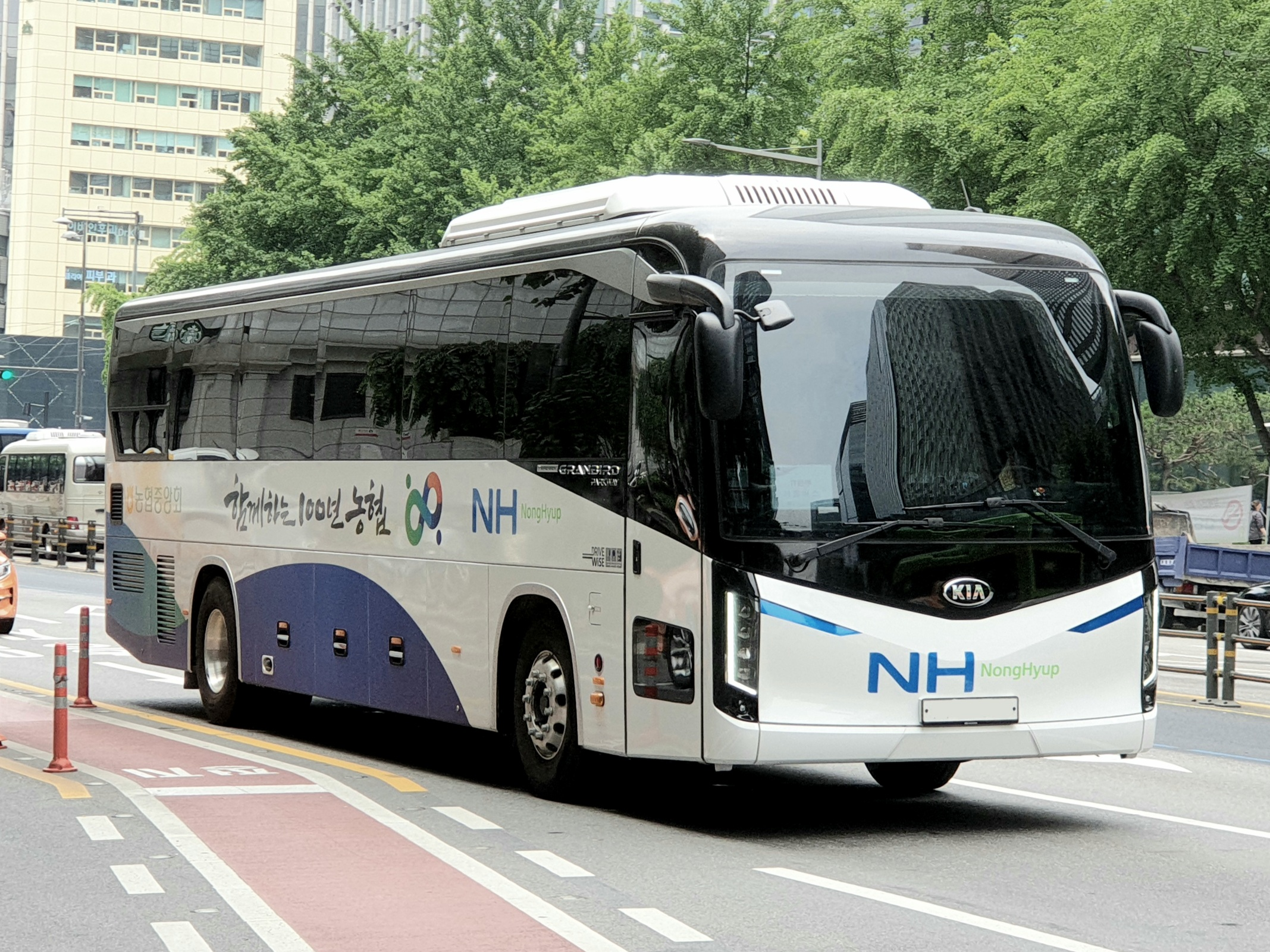
Kia Granbird Super Premium

Unveiled on 14 May 2020, the third-generation Kia Granbird continues to be underpinned by Hyundai's dedicated commercial vehicle chassis shared with the refreshed Hyundai Universe. It is available in Super Premium Sunshine and Super Premium Parkway trims. It features a large, completely color instrument cluster, and a large touchscreen infotainment system. The interior also features a new flat TV and an entertainment system is standard on the Super Premium Sunshine and Super Premium Parkway versions. The indoor height has been increased by 80mm, and the upper left and right widths of the interior have been expanded by 120mm.

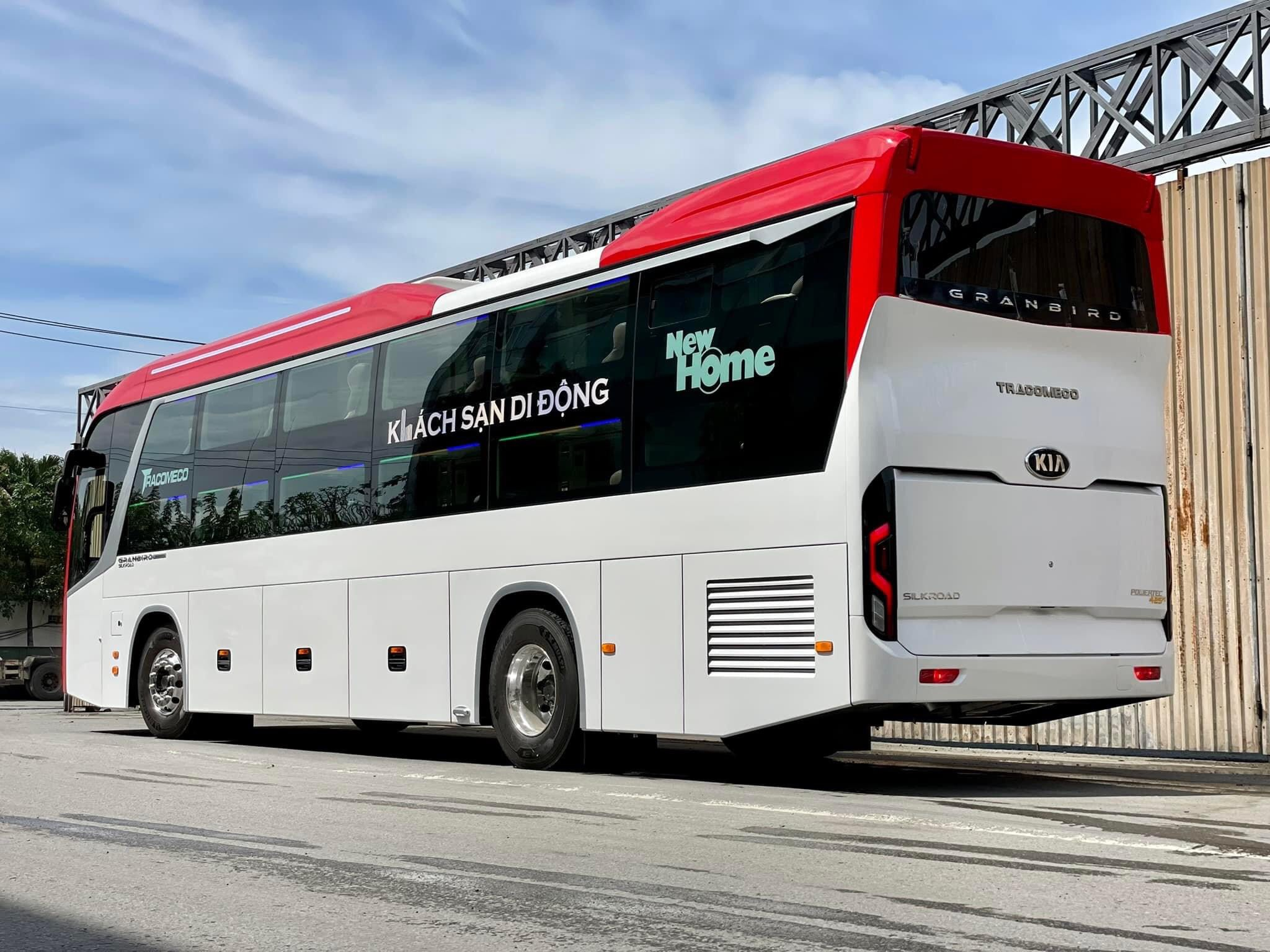
Rear View

For the first time in its class, a front parking assist device that sounds a warning sound when there is an obstacle in the lower front, a steering haptic that gives attention to the driver through vibration when operating with safety specifications, and automatically opens the door through a sensor when a person or object gets caught when the door is closed. The main entrance touch sensor, a speed-sensitive car height control device that adjusts the height of the vehicle according to the vehicle speed to improve aerodynamic performance, etc., are applied.

The powertrain of the refreshed coach is a Powertech 12.7 liter Hyundai D6CG (Euro 6) (440ps) diesel engine paired to both manual and automatic transmissions.

On June 17, 2026, Kia announced that the Granbird would be discontinued by 2028, and new orders are no longer being taken.
