= Hyundai Universe =

Korean luxury coach

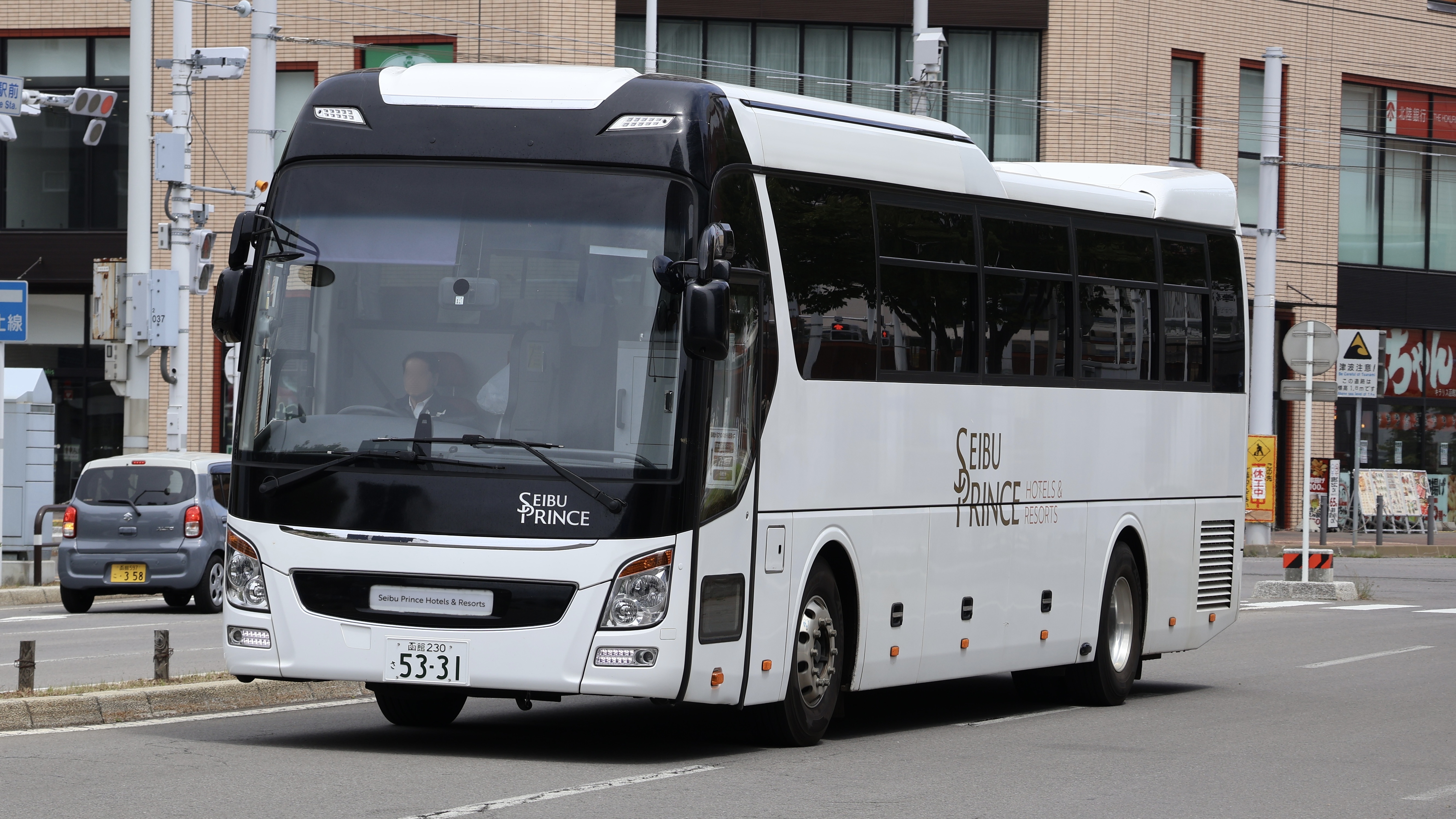
- Hyundai Universe in Hakodate, Japan

Overview
- Manufacturer: Hyundai Motor Company
- Production: 2006–present
- Designer: Hyundai Motor Company Design Center

Body and chassis
- Class: Bus
- Body style: Single-decker coach
- Platform: Hyundai Bus Chassis
- Doors: 1 (passenger bus) 2 (city bus)
- Related: Kia Granbird

Powertrain
- Engine: D6AB (300 PS); D6AC (340 PS); D6AV (235 PS); D6HA (Euro 4) (380 PS); D6CB-38 (380 PS); D6CB-41 (410 PS); D6CC (Euro 4) (425 PS); D6CD (Euro 5) (425 PS); D6CG (Euro 6) (440 PS)
- Transmission: 5/6-speed manual (Hyundai or ZF); 6-speed automatic (ZF)

Dimensions
- Wheelbase: 5,850 mm (230 in); 6,020 mm (237 in); 6,120 mm (241 in); 6,625 mm (260.8 in) (Prime EX/Noble EX)
- Length: 11,650 mm (459 in); 11,780 mm (464 in); 12,020 mm (473 in); 12,520 mm (493 in) (Prime EX/Noble EX)
- Width: 2,495 mm (98.2 in)
- Height: 3,340 mm (131 in); 3,385 mm (133.3 in); 3,535 mm (139.2 in)

Chronology
- Predecessor: Hyundai Aero

The Hyundai Universe (hangul:현대 유니버스) is a heavy-duty luxury coach manufactured by the truck & bus division of Hyundai. Introduced in November 2006, it is primarily available as luxury hi-classic tourist buses. It is related to its sibling, the second generation Kia Granbird since 2007.

It is distinguishable by a front 'Universe' badge by Hyundai's global standard luxury coach, but the common Hyundai badge is luxurious bus design usually used on the rear.

Its principal competitor is the Zyle Daewoo Bus FX series, and BX212 and Kia Granbird.

== First generation (PV; 2006) ==
=== Design ===
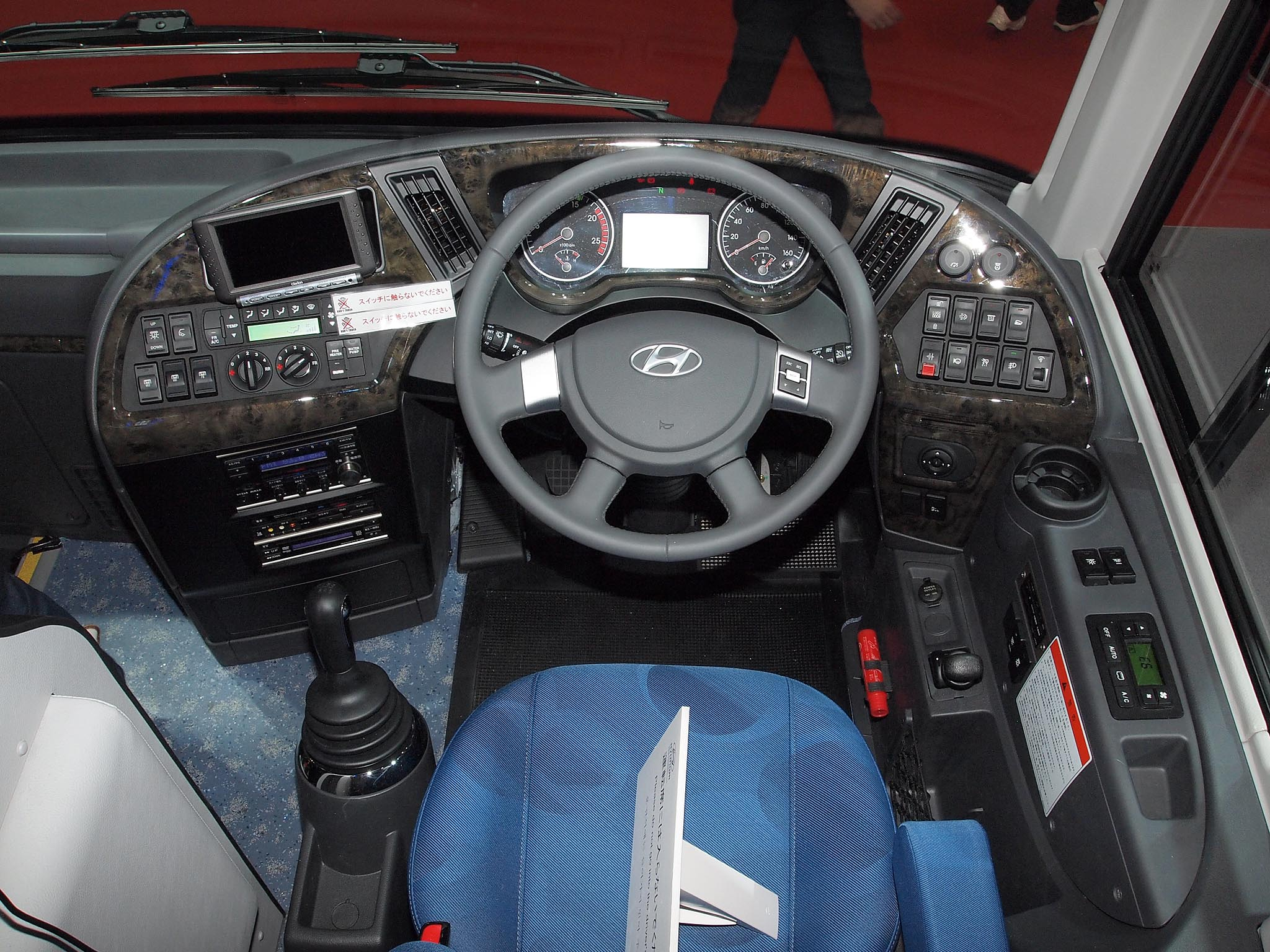
Interior (Japan)

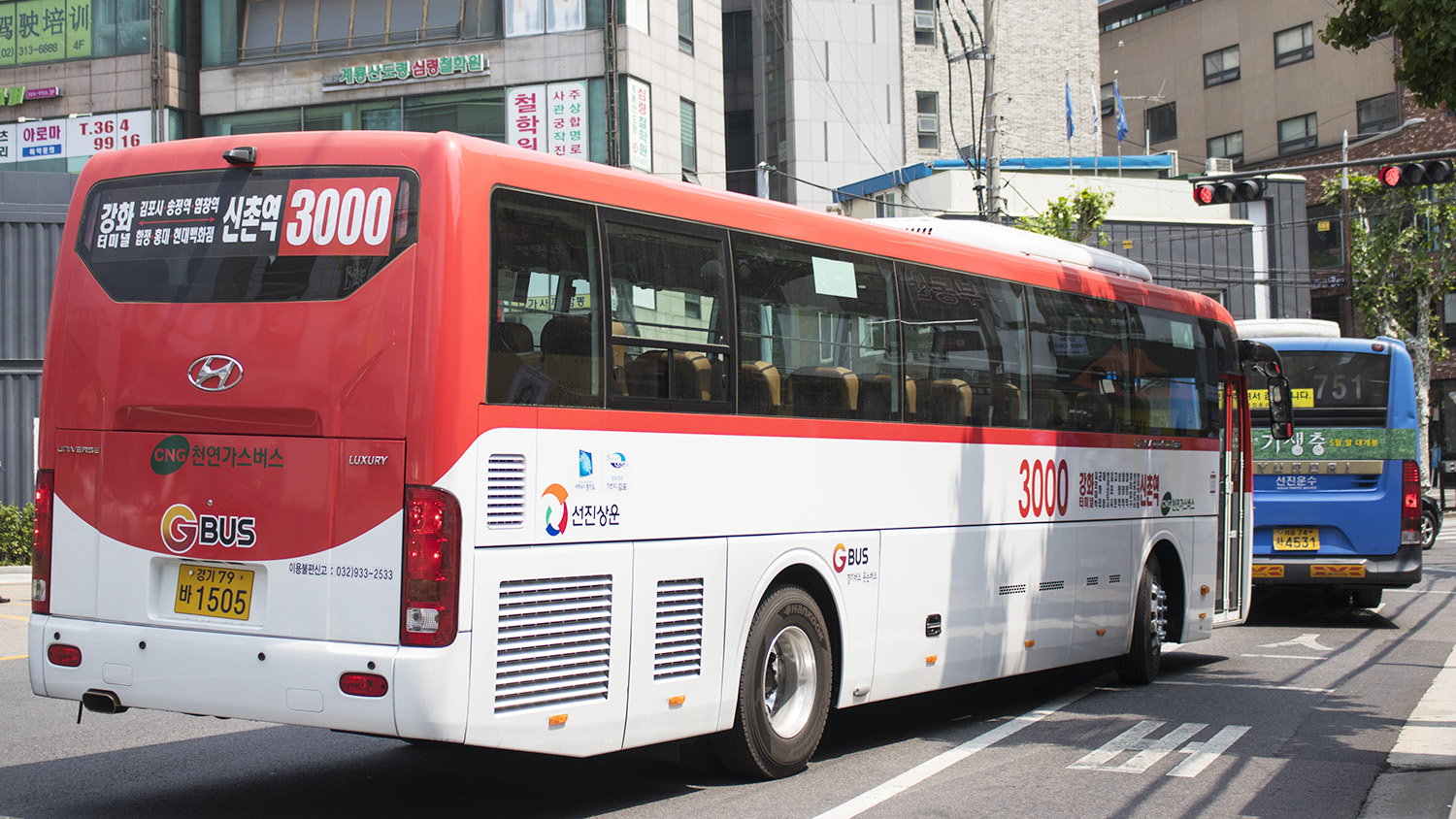
Rear view

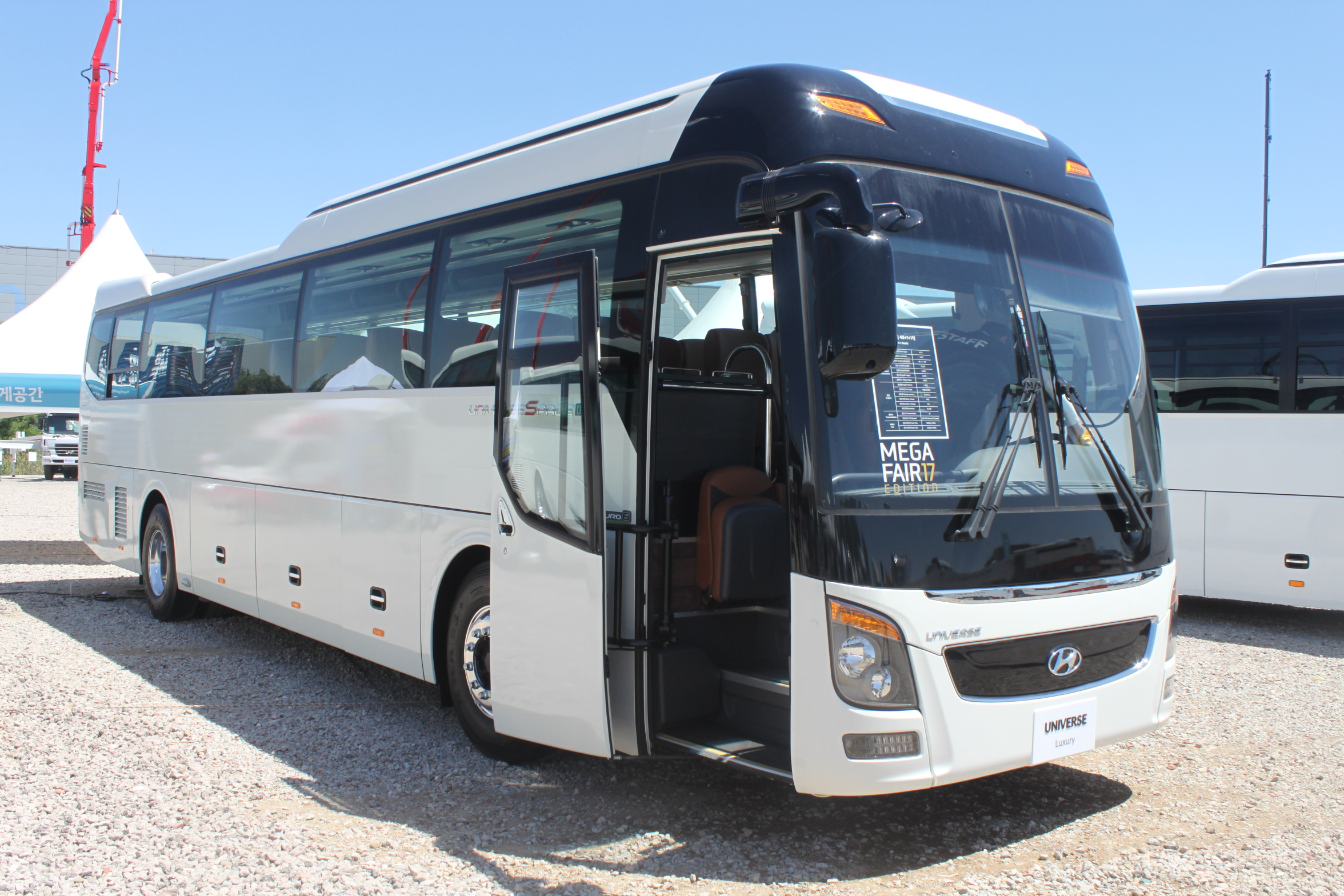
Front view (Space Luxury)

Introduced as the successor to the Hyundai Aero, the new model was developed in a period of 3 years under the project codename PY.

Unlike its predecessor, the Universe has been developed with Hyundai's proprietary technology and was fitted with a monocoque body to enhance structural rigidity and provides lightweight body construction. This contributes to a reduction in vibration and better roll over protection. Furthermore, disc-brake equipped versions would also benefit from the Electronic Stability Program including ABS and ASR. The Universe also features modern dynamic styling, sporting a sleek aerodynamic look, accentuated by optional spoilers. Driving ergonomics were also improved as well as greater durability to extend service life.

The engines are Hyundai's 235–340 PS (173–250 kW) units from the Q family, coupled with 5-speed manual gearbox. A cleaner and economical Euro-III compliant engine is also offered. Most powerful was the electronically controlled Powertec D6CB engine capable of 410 PS (302 kW), but also available in a 380 PS (279 kW) version. These have 5-speed manual gearboxes or a 12-speed ZF AS Tronic Semi-automatic transmission. In 2008, Euro-IV compliant engines were added up to the range following the development of the new D6HA and Powertec D6CC engines, with outputs ranging from 380–425 PS (279–313 kW). Carbon footprint-conscious operators could also opt in for alternative fuel engines such as the CNG powered Q-engine with 340 PS (250 kW). In 2018 a fully automatic transmission with a torque converter became available; the 6-speed ZF EcoLife was available together with the Powertec engines.

The model lineup includes "Classic" and "Luxury" trim levels in the standard deck "Space" variant, while the "Noble" trim level in the high deck "Xpress" variant stands at the top of the range. Additional trim levels for Korean domestic models includes "Comfort" and "Elegance" for the Space variant as well as "Prime" and "Noble Queen" for the Xpress variant. The "Limousine" trim level introduced for VIP class is the ultimate in luxury and comfort. The difference between each trim levels lies primarily on the features adapted per application such as aesthetics, engine power output, suspension type, passenger capacity, and interior configuration. The Universe is also offered in right-hand drive orientation and can also be equipped with an on-board restroom, wheel chair lift, or an emergency door.

=== Models ===
The Universe was designed by Hyundai Motor Company Jeonju Design Center. It was based on a rebadged Hyundai Bus Chassis. Starting in 2019, a long-axis model called EX was released. The variants include:

- Space
  - Comfort: successor to Aero Space LD
  - Classic
  - Elegance: successor to Aero Space LS
  - Luxury
  - Luxury Premium (2019–present)
- Xpress
  - Prime: successor to Aero Hi-Space
  - Prime EX (2020–present)
  - Noble
  - Noble Queen: successor to Aero Queen Hi-Class
  - Noble EX (2019–present)
  - Prestige

=== 2019 facelift ===
Unveiled on 22 January 2019, the refreshed Hyundai Universe is the first coach model remained to use Hyundai's commercial vehicle chassis, that also shared with the basis of the refreshed Kia Granbird from 2020. It also comes with Blue Link connected services. It features a restyled grille instead of Hyundai's cascading grille, restyled headlamps with I-shaped LED tech, and restyled tail lamps with also an LED. The interior also features a restyled entertainment system, and the dashboard retains a large color instrument cluster, and a large touchscreen infotainment system.

The powertrain of the refreshed coach is a Powertech 12.7-liter diesel engine paired to both manual and automatic transmissions.

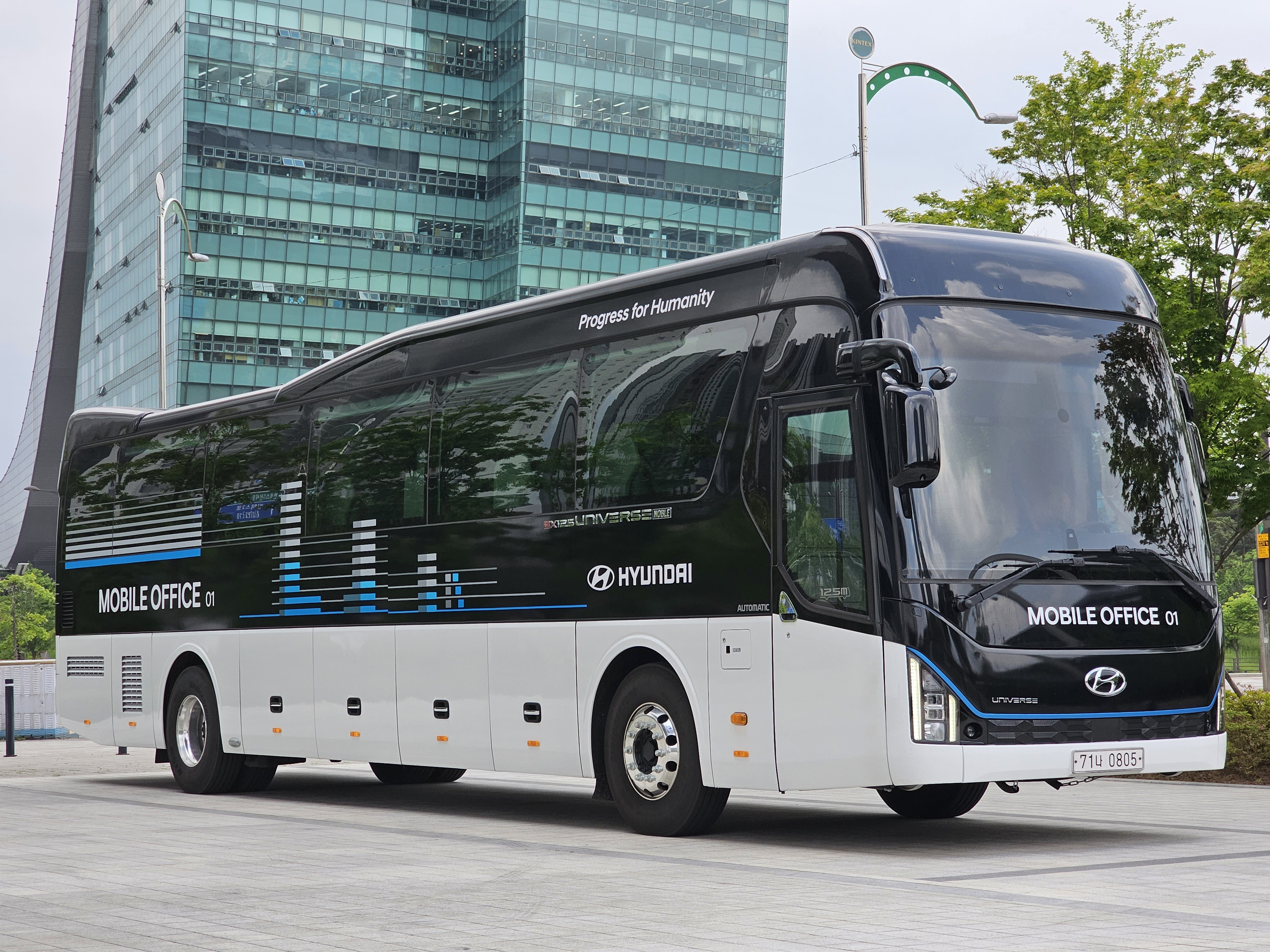
2019 Front view

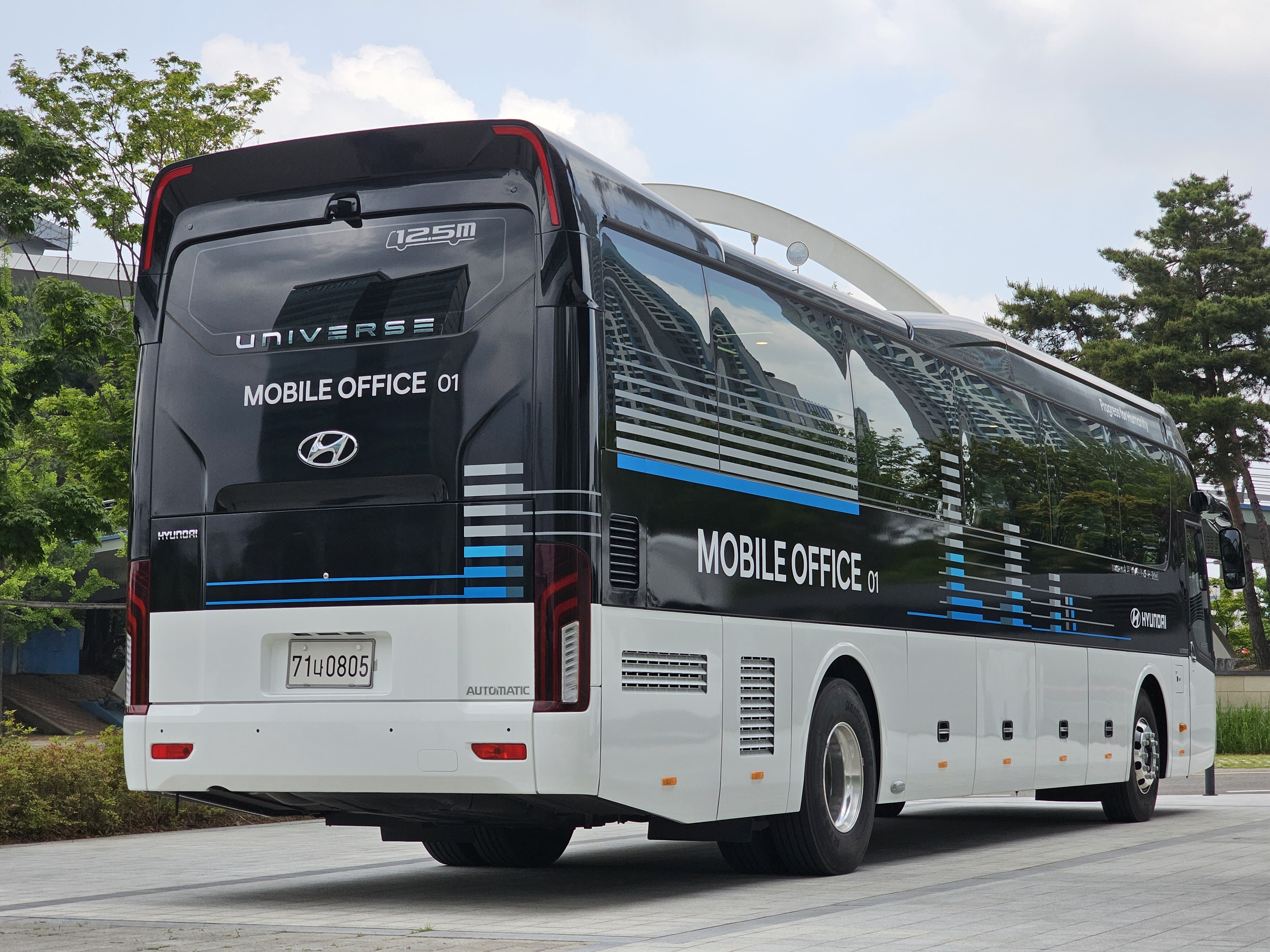
Rear view

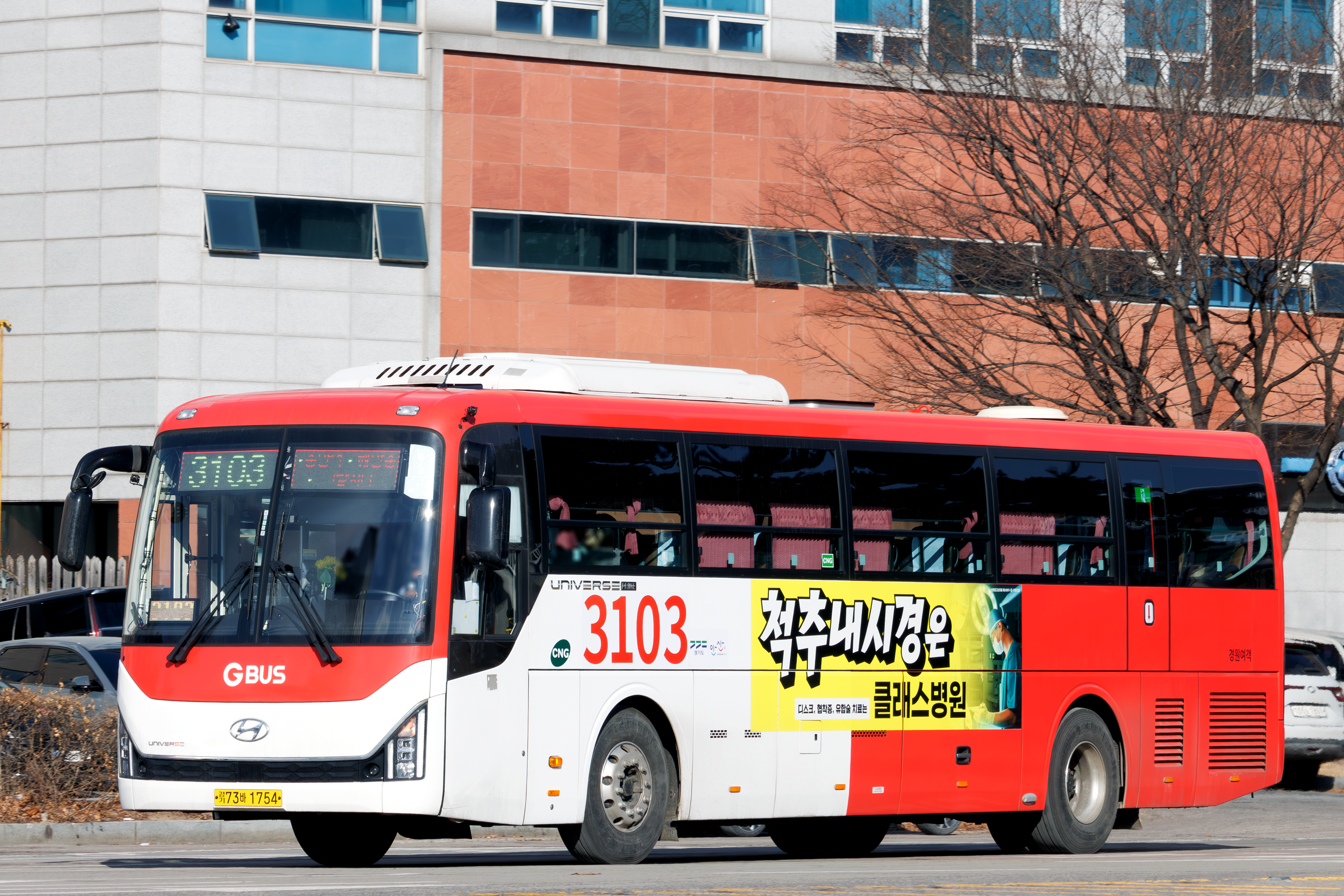
Universe Prime Facelift at Ansan

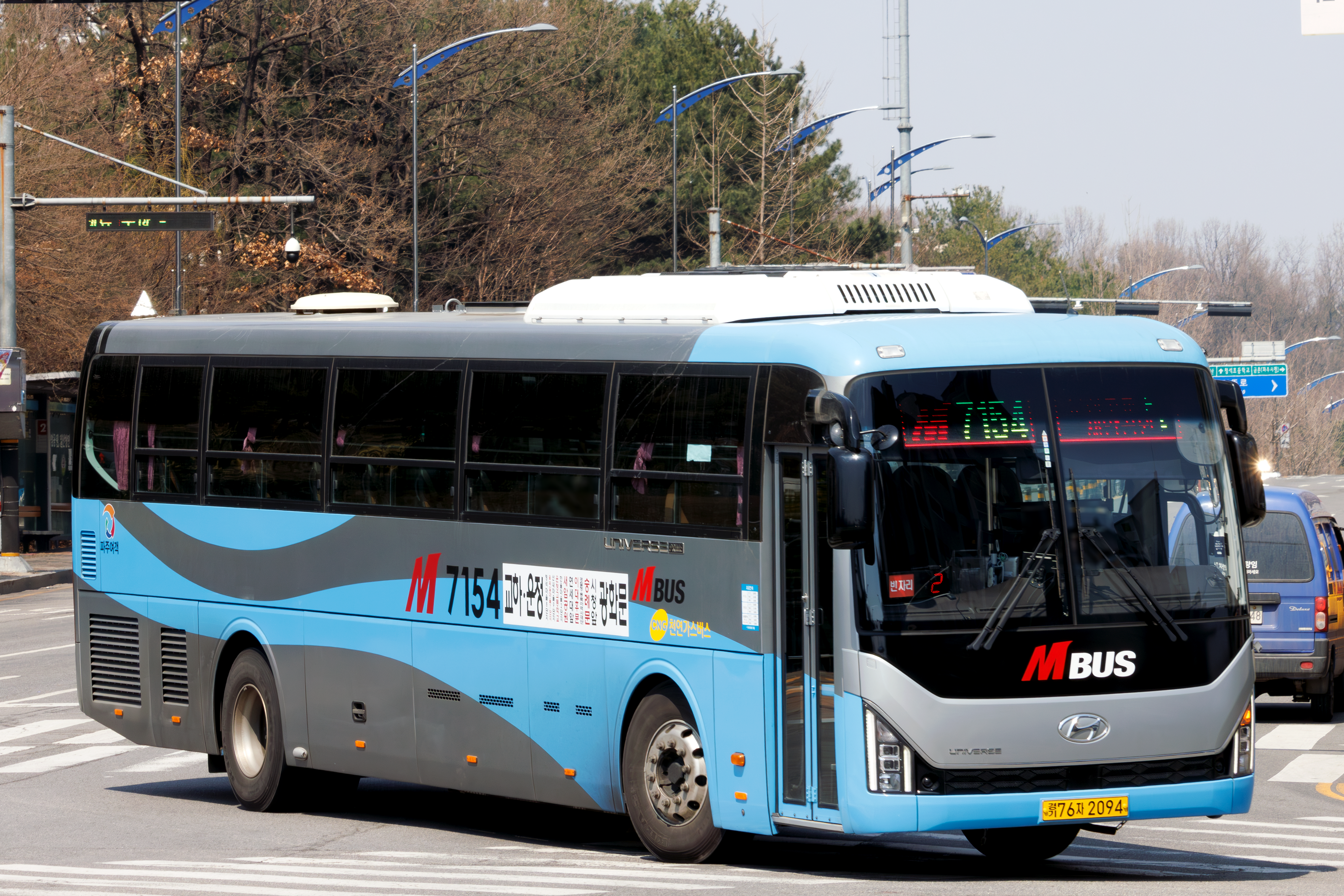
Universe Prime Facelift at Paju

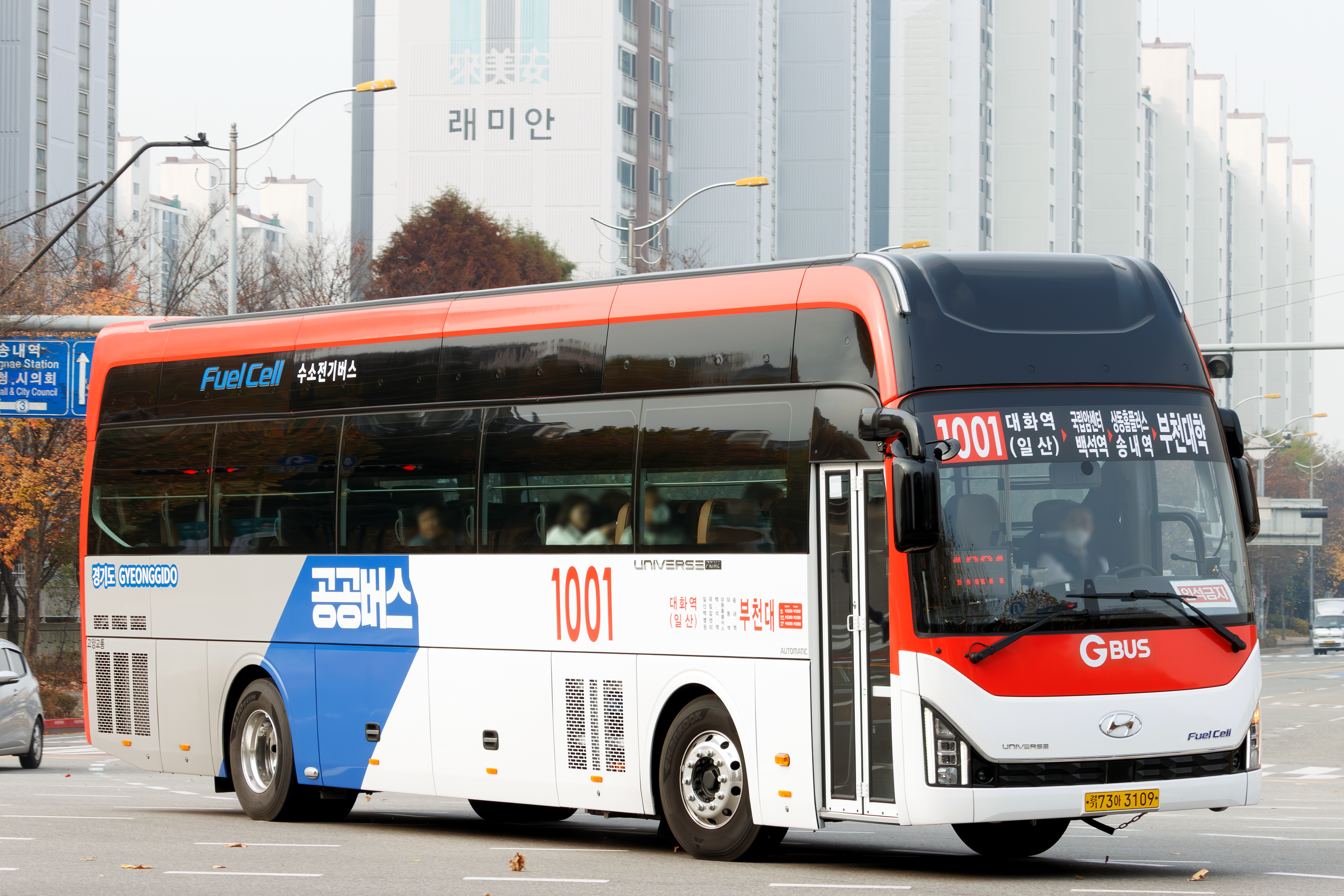
Universe Prime Facelift FCEV at Goyang

== Derivatives ==
THACO Bluesky 120 in Volvo B8R chassis

A derivative of the Universe was the Vietnamese-built THACO Bluesky which is available in 47 seat configurations

== See also ==
- Hyundai Motor Company
- Hyundai Aero City
- Hyundai RB
- Hyundai Aero
- Kia Granbird
