= Bataan Transit =

Bus company in the Philippines

Bataan Transit Co., Inc.

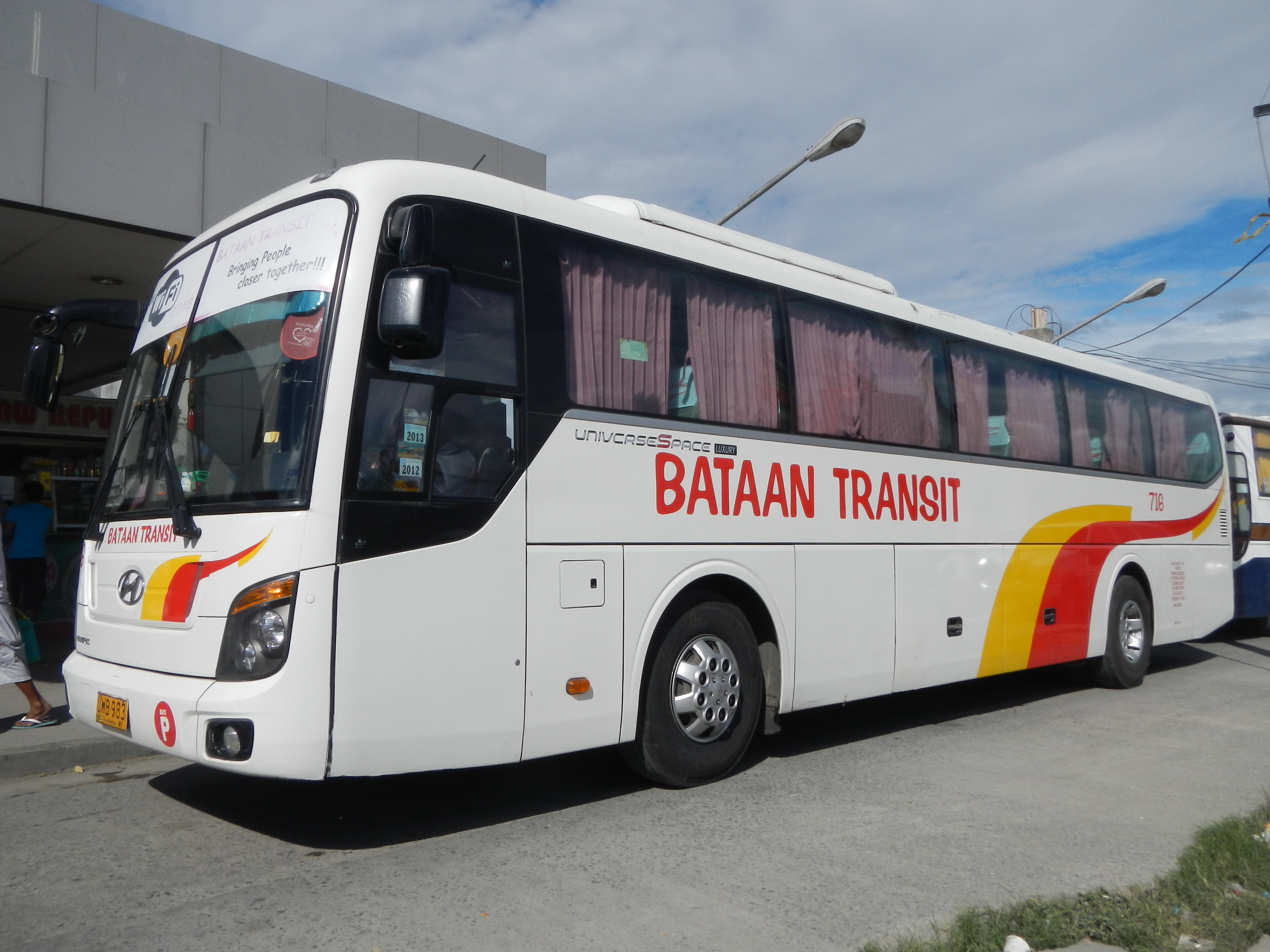
- A bus of Bataan Transit
- Parent: First North Luzon Transit
- Founded: May 15, 2003; 23 years ago (as Nichaea Tours, Inc.)
- Headquarters: Cubao, Quezon City, Philippines
- Service area: Bataan; Metro Manila; Ilocos Region
- Service type: Provincial Operation
- Alliance: Maria de Leon Transportation
- Fleet: 100+
- Operator: Bataan Transit Co., Inc. (2007–present)

Bataan Transit Co., Inc. is a provincial bus company in the Philippines plying Central and North Luzon, particularly to the provinces of Bataan and La Union.

Under the management of its parent, the Five Star Bus Company it serves routes to Bataan and La Union aside from its parent it also manages another company of the alliance, First North Luzon Transit. The company also operates Maria de Leon Transportation which serves Avenida–Ilocos Region.

== History ==
Bataan Transit was founded on May 15, 2003, as Nichaea Tours, Inc., taking over from the Bataan route of Philippine Rabbit in June 2003. Its fleet has since grown to 50 buses. They first started their operations in Balanga, Bataan, and then later expanded to Mariveles and San Fernando, La Union.

=== Main stops ===
For Bataan passengers, their main stop is either the Bataan Transit terminal at San Fernando, Pampanga, or the Travellers Former (Double Happiness) bus stop at Lubao.

For the inter-provincial route Mariveles-San Fernando (La Union) the main stop can also be Bataan Transit's terminal in San Fernando.

== Fleet ==
Bataan Transit utilizes and maintains the following:

Hyundai Motors Korea

- Hyundai Universe Space Luxury
- Hyundai Universe Space Xpress Noble
- Hyundai Universe Space Luxury Classic
- Hyundai Universe Space Luxury Premium
- Kia Granbird Bluesky S125
- Kia Granbird Sunshine S125

Higer

- Higer KLQ6128LQ
- Higer KLQ6129G

== Terminals ==
=== Metro Manila ===
These terminals are shared with Five Star Bus Company:

- Cubao
- Avenida
- Monumento

=== Central Luzon ===
- Bataan
  - Balanga
  - Mariveles

=== Ilocos Region ===
- La Union
  - San Fernando

== Destinations ==
=== Metro Manila ===
- Cubao, Quezon City
- Avenida, Manila

=== Provincial Destinations ===
- San Fernando, Pampanga (shared with First North Luzon Transit)
- Balanga, Bataan (shared with First North Luzon Transit)
- Mariveles, Bataan (shared with First North Luzon Transit)

=== Inter-Provincial Lines ===
- Mariveles - San Fernando (La Union) via San Fernando (Pampanga) - Dau - SCTEX Concepcion Exit

=== Under Maria de Leon Transportation ===
With the under management of Bataan Transit, Maria de Leon uses the terminals and facilities of Bataan Transit including their main terminal in Avenida.

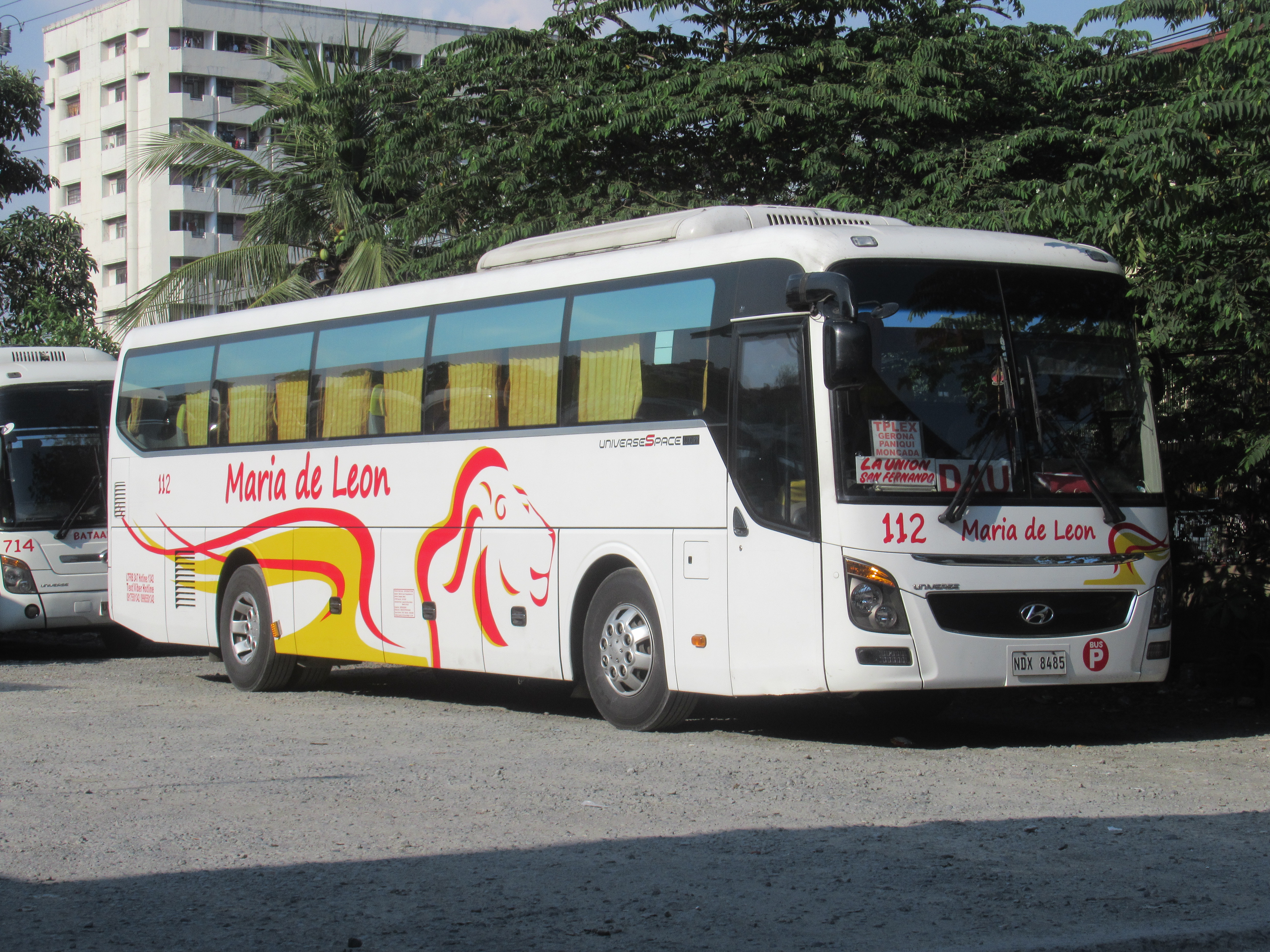
A Maria De Leon Hyundai Universe bus at Avenida Terminal in Manila. One of the units plies to Avenida–San Fernando route.

==== Metro Manila ====
- Avenida, Manila
- Cubao, Quezon City

==== Provincial Destinations ====
- Dau Bus Terminal, Mabalacat, Pampanga
- San Fernando, La Union
- Nueva Era, Ilocos Norte
- Laoag, Ilocos Norte

Note: All regular service buses pass through the TPLEX Carmen Exit, while Deluxe buses use TPLEX Urdaneta Exit.

== See also ==
- Genesis Transport
- Baliwag Transit
