= First North Luzon Transit =

Bus company in the Philippines

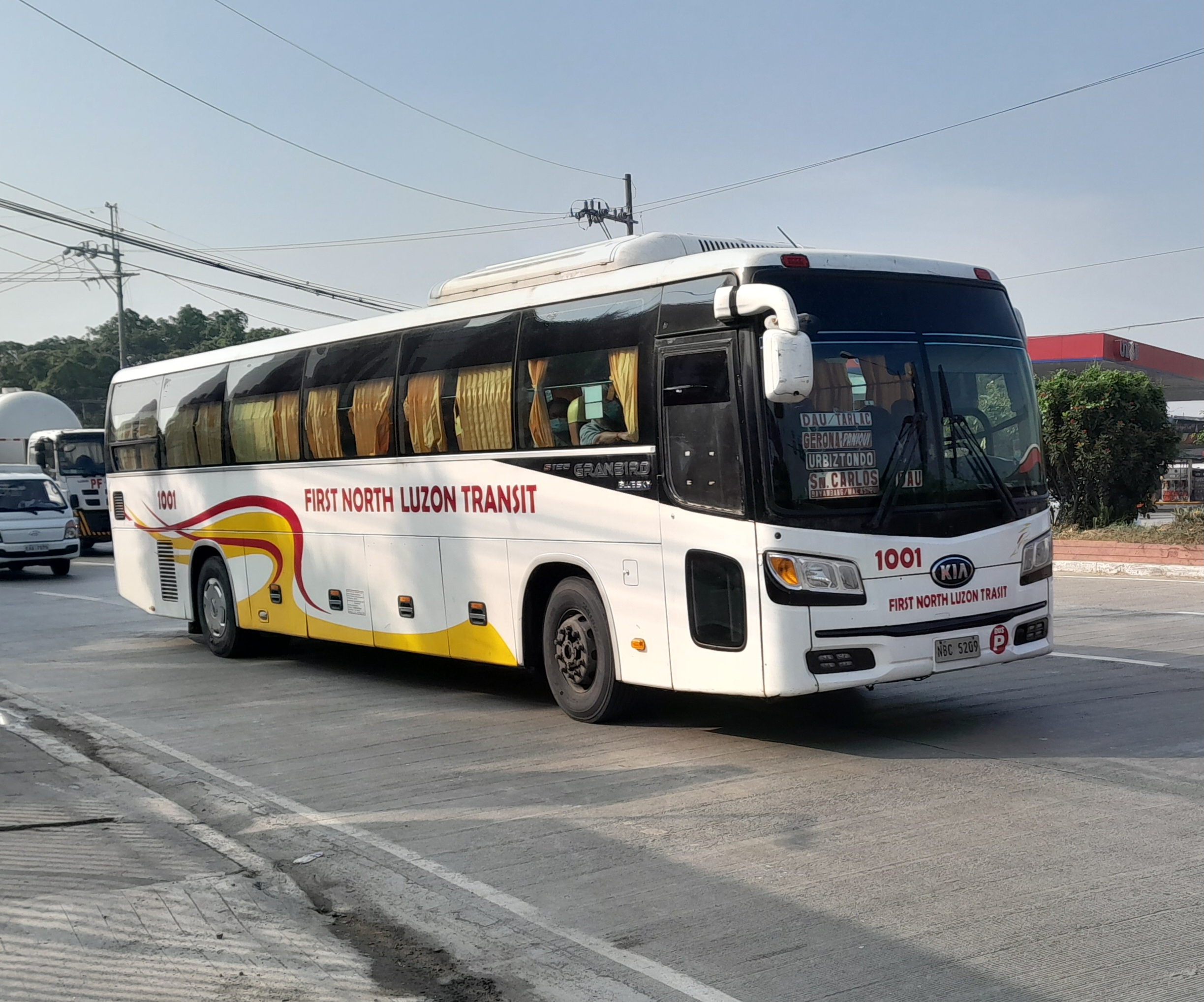
- A First North Luzon Bus with Cubao - San Carlos route
- Formerly: Royal Eagle
- Parent: Five Star Bus Company
- Founded: 2007; 19 years ago
- Headquarters: 17A Mirasol St., Brgy. San Roque, Murphy, Cubao, Quezon City
- Locale: Luzon
- Service area: Metro Manila; Central Luzon; Ilocos Region
- Service type: Provincial Operation
- Hubs: Cubao
- Fleet: 300+
- Operator: First North Luzon Transit, Inc.

First North Luzon Transit, Incorporated (FNLT), formerly known as Royal Eagle, is a bus company in the Philippines. They started their operations in Hagonoy, Bulacan, and expanded to San Isidro, Nueva Ecija, Bulacan, Pampanga, Bataan and Pangasinan.

== History ==
First North Luzon Transit was founded in 2007 with a fleet of 100 buses.

Aside from being a public transport company, FNLT also offers shuttle services to individuals, corporations, and even to sponsor for major events. One example they did is when they sponsored free shuttle services from Metro Manila to the Philippine Arena during the #SaTamangPanahon concert of Eat Bulaga! last October 2015.

Their operations have since expanded to the provinces of Nueva Ecija, Pangasinan, La Union.

Royal Eagle, the former name of this bus company, was adopted when the Five Star Bus Company took over its management. The company initially began operations to Hagonoy, Bulacan and later expanded to San Isidro, Nueva Ecija, as well as several locations in Bulacan, Pampanga, Dagupan, San Carlos, Pangasinan, Bataan (including Mariveles and Balanga) and San Fernando, La Union. The company also has buses in Five Star and Bataan Transit hybrid livery.

Main Stops (for passengers)

For passengers travelling to Nueva Ecija (San Isidro only), their main stop is at Sto. Domingo in Mexico, Pampanga.

Pangasinan passengers are allowed to disembark at the Dau Bus Terminal in Mabalacat, Pampanga.

For the inter-provincial route between Mariveles and San Fernando (La Union), passengers also have the option to disembark at the Bataan Transit bus terminal in San Fernando, Pampanga.

== Fleet ==
First North Luzon Transit maintains and utilizes the following:

- Golden Dragon XML6122J18 "Triumph"
- Golden Dragon XML6103J12
- Golden Dragon XML6127J6
- Yutong ZK6100H
- Yutong ZK6119HA
- Higer KLQ6128LQ
- Higer KLQ6119QE3
- Kia Granbird Bluesky S125
- Hyundai Universe Space Luxury Premium
- Hino RK
- Volvo B7R
- Higer KLQ6127LA
- Yutong ZK6128H C12 Pro

== Terminals ==
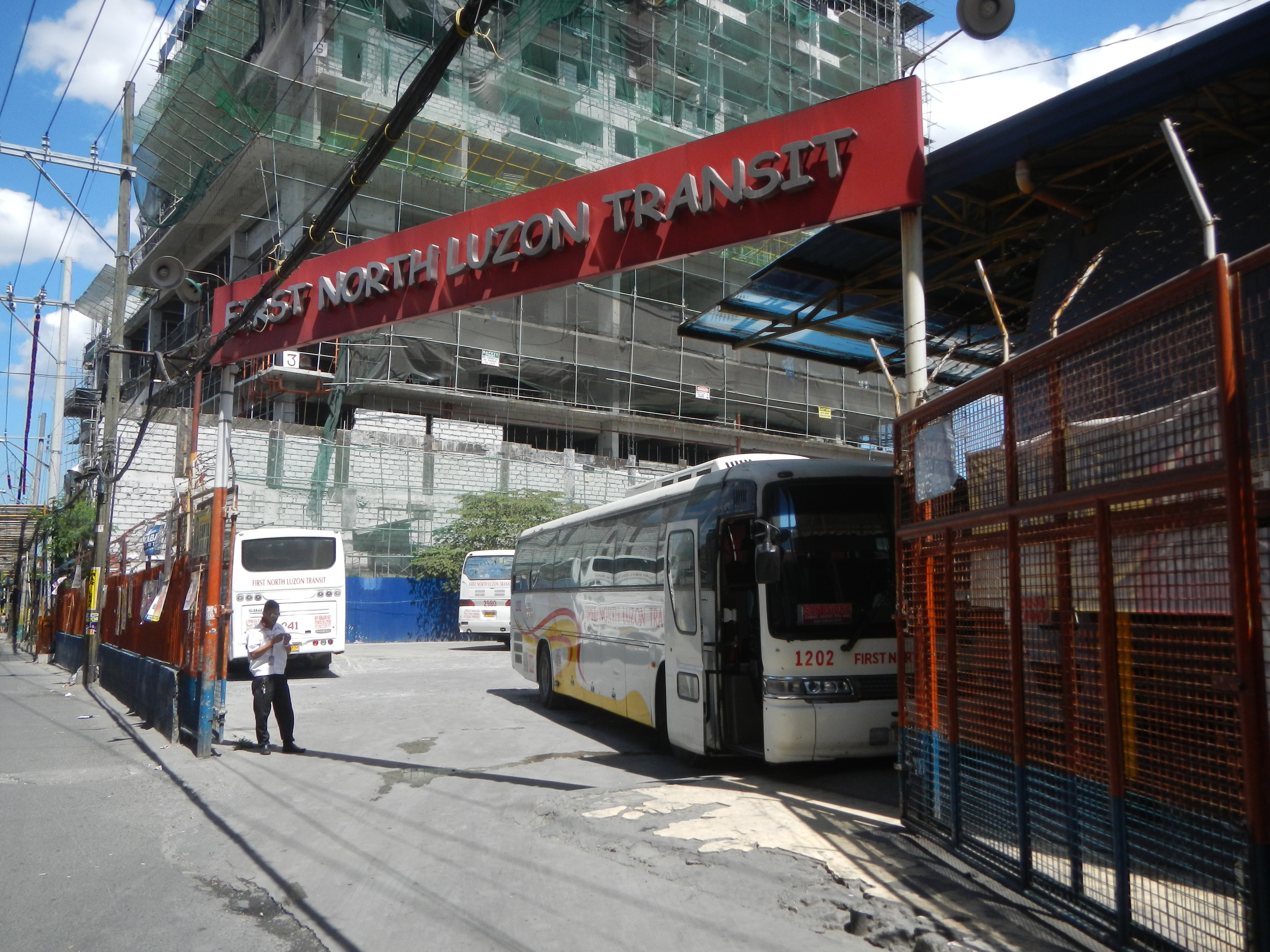
A FNLT Terminal in Caloocan.

These are their terminals as of 2018:

Under the management of Five Star and Bataan Transit, the First North Luzon Transit uses some of the terminals operated by these companies, primarily Five Star's Cubao Terminal and Bataan Transit's San Fernando terminal (La Union).

- Cubao - Five Star Bus Terminal, EDSA, Cubao, Quezon City
- P. Tuazon - EDSA corner P. Tuazon, Cubao, Quezon City
- Caloocan - LRT-Monumento, cor. 12th Ave. & Rizal Avenue Ext., Caloocan City
- Total Gas Station - Balintawak, EDSA-Balintawak, Quezon City
- Divisoria, Manila - Divisoria Street, corner Mayhaligue Street, Tondo, Manila (for Pampanga and Pangasinan trips only).
- Avenida, Manila - Bataan Transit Bus Terminal, Avenida, Manila

=== Provincial Hubs ===
==== Northern Luzon ====
- Ilocos Norte
  - Laoag - Gov. Lazaro Street corner Llanes Street, Laoag (Maria de Leon Terminal)
- La Union
  - San Fernando - Brgy. Pagdaraoan, San Fernando, La Union (Bataan Transit Terminal)
- Pangasinan
  - Dagupan - Arellano St., Dagupan
  - San Carlos - Perez Blvd., San Carlos, Pangasinan
  - San Manuel - Guiset Sur, San Manuel, Pangasinan
  - Urbiztondo - Brgy. Dalanguiring, Urbiztondo, Pangasinan

==== Central Luzon ====
- Bataan
  - Balanga - Don Manuel Banzon Ave., Balanga, Bataan
  - Mariveles - Lakandula St., Mariveles, Bataan (Bataan Transit Terminal)
- Bulacan
  - Hagonoy - Brgy. San Sebastian, Hagonoy, Bulacan
- Pampanga
  - Candaba - Brgy., San Agustin Street corner Alcasid boulevard, Candaba, Pampanga
  - Macabebe - Brgy. Sta. Rita, Macabebe, Pampanga
- Tarlac
  - Tarlac City - Siesta Bus Stop, Zamora St., Tarlac City, Tarlac
- Nueva Ecija
  - San Isidro - Brgy. San Roque, San Isidro
  - Cabanatuan - Brgy. Mabini Extension Cabanatuan

== Destinations ==
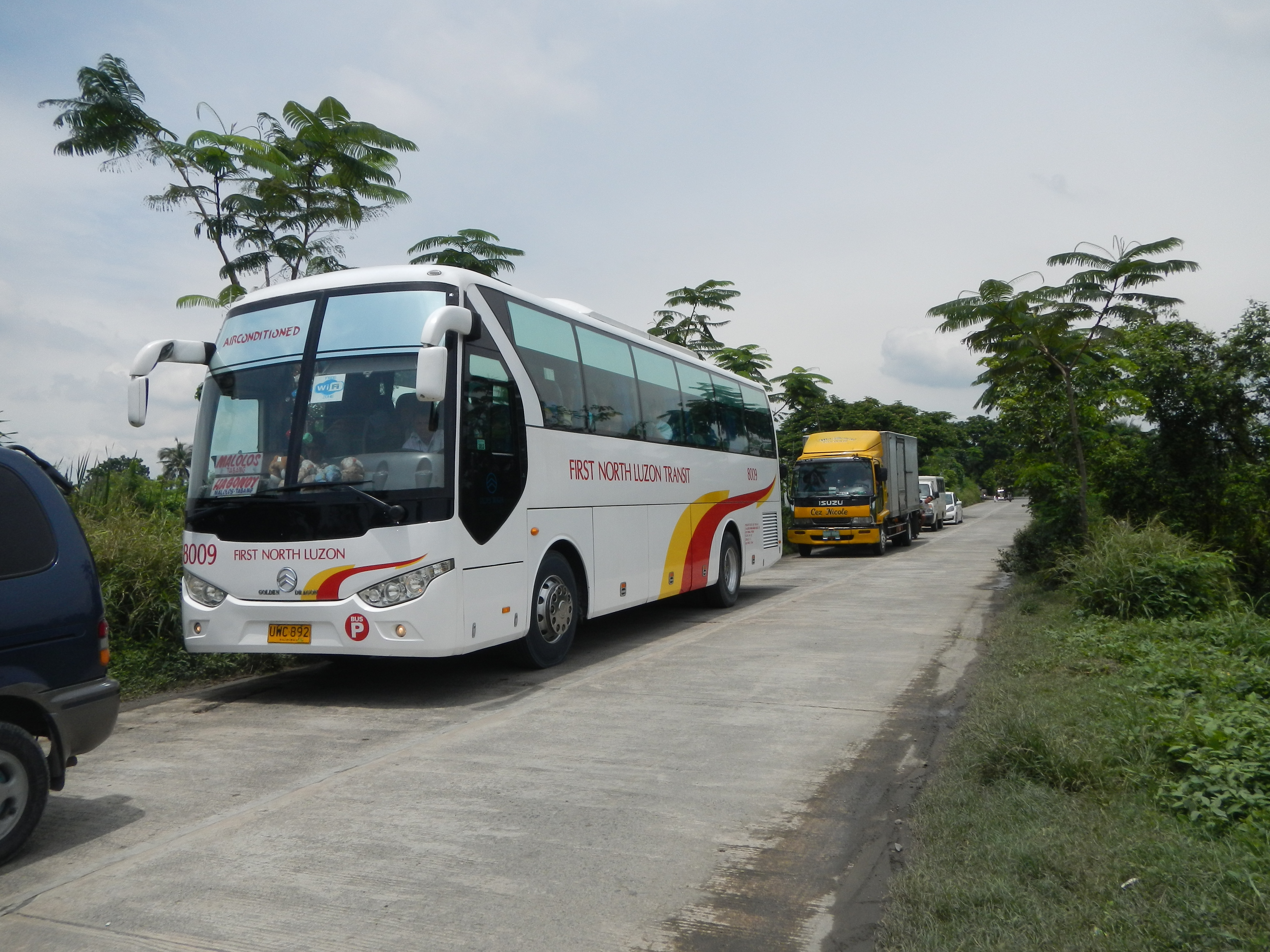
An FNLT bus in the Bataan Transit hybrid livery at Paombong, Bulacan

With the management of Five Star, First North Luzon Transit uses the terminal of Five Star, including main terminal in Cubao

=== Metro Manila ===
- Avenida, Manila
- Cubao, Quezon City
- Monumento, Caloocan

=== Provincial Destinations ===
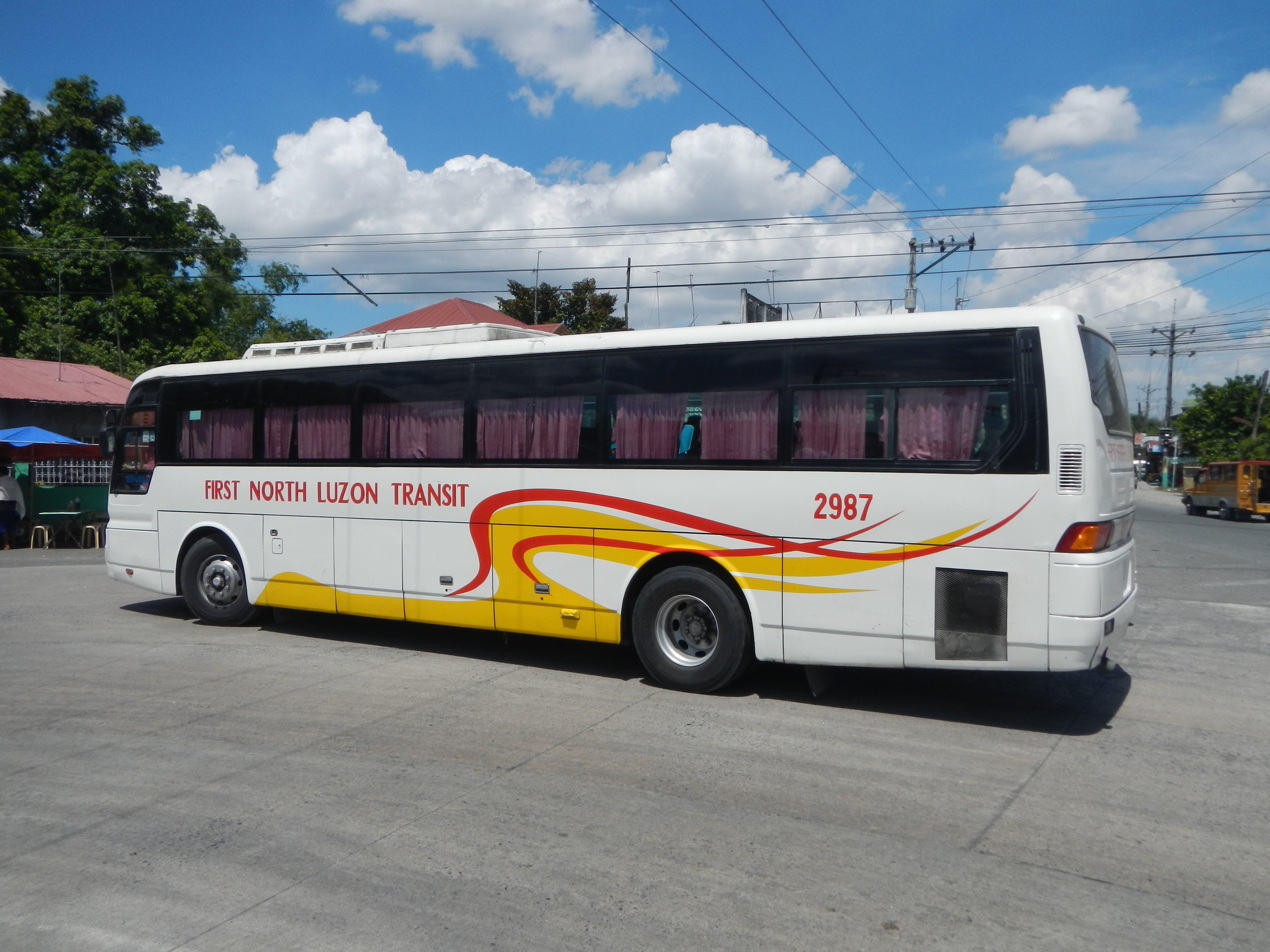
An FNLT bus in Mexico, Pampanga

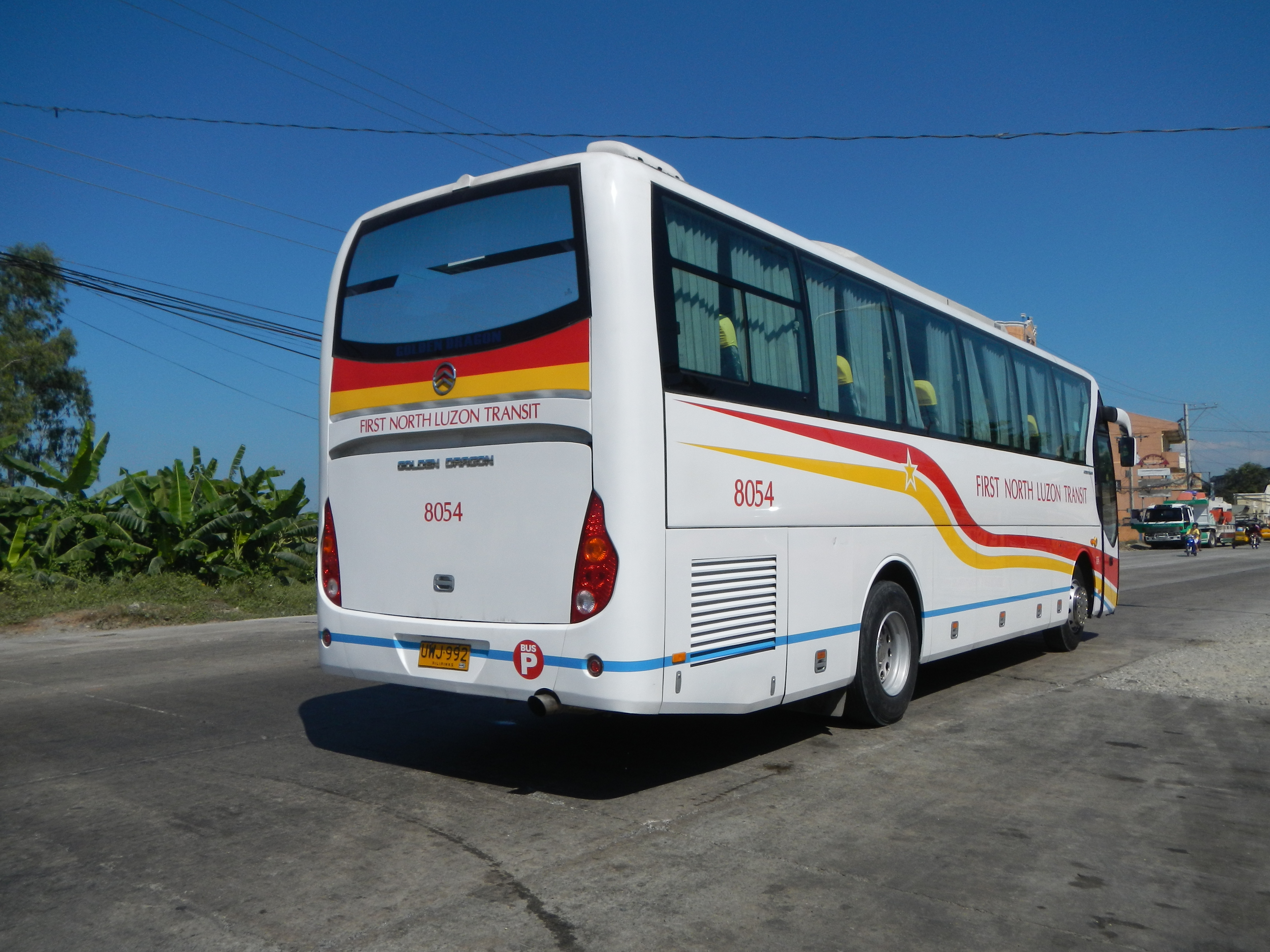
An FNLT bus in the Five Star hybrid livery

- Malolos, Bulacan
- Hagonoy, Bulacan
- San Isidro, Nueva Ecija
- Cabanatuan, Nueva Ecija
- Arayat, Pampanga
- Marquee Mall, Angeles, Pampanga
- Dau Bus Terminal, Mabalacat, Pampanga
- Macabebe, Pampanga
- Masantol, Pampanga
- San Fernando, Pampanga
- Balanga, Bataan
- Mariveles, Bataan
- Tarlac City
- Balungao, Pangasinan
- Dagupan, Pangasinan
- San Carlos, Pangasinan
- San Manuel, Pangasinan
- Santa Maria, Pangasinan
- Urbiztondo, Pangasinan
- Umingan, Pangasinan

Note: Buses from Cubao to San Carlos/San Manuel Pangasinan will pass SCTEX Concepcion exit, however in 2024 some of buses use TPLEX Gerona exit.

== Former Routes ==
First North Luzon Transit previously served the Dagupan - Baguio route via Agoo, La Union, which is now serviced by Victory Liner.

The former Royal Eagle also had a route to Roxas, Isabela which is now operated by Victory Liner, as well as Santiago, Isabela and Maddela, Quirino which are now serviced by Five Star Bus Company.

== Sister companies and subsidiaries ==
Although First North Luzon Transit is under its parent, Five Star Bus Company, the company has also subsidiaries bearing these names:

- Bataan Transit
- Luzon Cisco Transport
- CityBus Inc.
- RJ Express Inc.
- Laguna StarBus Transportation System, Inc
- First Metro Bus Express Inc.
- Maria de Leon Transportation (operated by Bataan Transit)

== See also ==
- List of bus companies of the Philippines
