= Bicol Isarog Transport System =

Bus company in the Philippines

Bicol Isarog Transport System, Inc.
- Founded: April 19, 2011; 14 years ago
- Headquarters: 96 Mirasol Street, Corner 20th Avenue, Cubao, Quezon City, Philippines
- Service area: Metro Manila; Bicol Region; Eastern Visayas
- Service type: Provincial Operation
- Operator: Bicol Isarog Transport System Incorporated
- Website: bicolisarog.com

Bicol Isarog Transport System, Inc. (BITSI, also known as simply Bicol Isarog) is a Philippine bus company based in Quezon City. Bicol Isarog, along with 6 sister bus lines, operates routes that primarily serves the Bicol Region, as well as Samar Province and Leyte Province.

== History ==
Bicol Isarog Transport System Inc. was formally incorporated in the Securities and Exchange Commission on April 19, 2011. The company has then been operating the Penafrancia, RSL bus transport and Isarog Lines to include several more bus routes which makes BITSI the leading bus company in the south of Luzon. With the recent partnership with VSPintados, the company now even expands its services bringing people safer in the Eastern Visayas region particularly in Calbayog, Catbalogan, Tacloban, Ormoc and Maasin. In September 2022, BITSI announced a new transport hub in Arcovia City, Pasig.

== Subsidiaries ==
- Palawan Cherry Bus
- Cat Island Express
- Our Lady of Salvacion Bus Lines Inc.
- Legazpi St. Jude Transport Lines Inc.
- Florencia Transport Services Inc
- Peñafrancia Tours and Travel Transport
- Victory Liner
- Five Star Bus Company

== Discontinued subsidiaries ==
- Isarog Line (renamed and now under Bicol Isarog Transport System)
- RSL Bus Transport (now under Bicol Isarog Transport System)
- Our Lady of Penãfrancia Bus Lines Inc. (now under Peñafrancia Tours and Travel Transport)
- VS Pintados Corp. (renamed and now under Bicol Isarog Transport System)
- St. Rafael Transport Lines Inc.
- ARMJ Elavil Tours Phils. Inc. (renamed and now under Bicol Isarog Transport System)
