= San Aurelio National High School =

Location
- Minglana Road, Brgy. San Aurelio 2nd, Balungao, Pangasinan, Philippines
- Coordinates: 15°53′45″N 120°41′13″E

Information
- Former name: San Aurelio Barangay High School
- Type: Public High School, Government School
- Established: 1967
- Grades: 7 to 12
- Color(s): green

The San Aurelio National High School (SANHS) is a Public High School and a National High School, Located in Eastern District of Pangasinan, Ilocos region, and it was the first operating Public High School in the town of Balungao Balungao, Pangasinan. It was founded on 1967 as a Semi-private institution formerly located in the elementary school, it is known as San Aurelio Barangay High School until it was officially changed to San Aurelio National High School because of the increasing number of student from neighboring towns. It was moved from the Elementary school to the location where it was now located.

== History ==
The needs of secondary level Public High School in the town of Balungao Balungao, Pangasinan ceased the local government to establish a Semi-Private High School. The first high school in the town which was a Private High School, the Balungao Central High School located in the near the town proper doesn't relieve the needs of free education in the secondary level. Before it was created on 1967 the students from the town of Balungao attended Rosales National High School located in the neighboring town of Rosales and considered one of the oldest school in the Eastern District of Province of Pangasinan. It was located at the San Aurelio Elementary School grounds when it was established in 1967 as San Aurelio Barangay High School with about six faculty members teaching uneven number of students coming from the 20 Barangay of the town and from neighboring towns, especially the town of Umingan. The semi-private institution tuition is far more cheaper than the Balungao Central High School. It was considered as the annex of the Rosales National High School.
