= Mount Balungao =

Inactive volcano in Pangasinan, Philippines

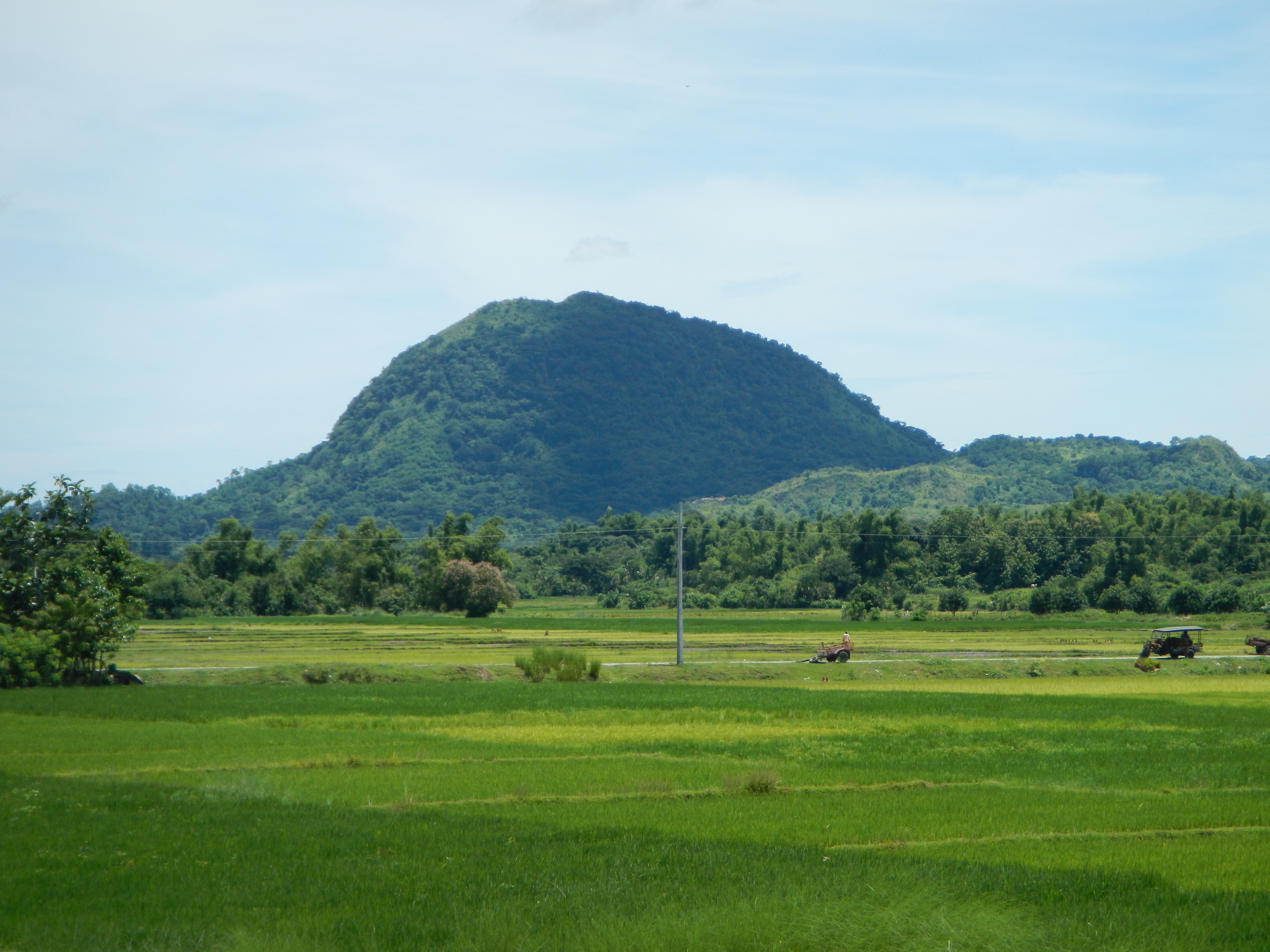
- Mount Balungao taken near National Road in Brgy. San Aurelio

Highest point
- Elevation: 382 m (1,253 ft)
- Listing: List of inactive volcanoes in the Philippines
- Coordinates: 15°51′45″N 120°40′57″E

Geography
- Location within Luzon Location within Philippines
- Location: Balungao, Pangasinan, Luzon, Philippines

Geology
- Mountain type: Cinder cone
- Last eruption: Unknown

Mount Balungao is an isolated inactive volcano located in Pangasinan, on the island of Luzon in the Philippines. Rising to a height of 382 metres (1,253 ft) ASL, it is located in the town of Balungao, about 5 kilometres (3.1 mi) from the town center. It is the main tourist attraction of the town, along with the Balungao Hot and Cold Spring Resort nearby. Mount Balungao is listed as an inactive volcano by the Philippine Institute of Volcanology and Seismology (PHIVOLCS).

The volcano is located in the flat agricultural region, near the border of the Province of Nueva Ecija.

== Listing ==
- List of inactive volcanoes in the Philippines
