= Five Star Bus Company =

Bus company in the Philippines

Pangasinan Five Star Bus Co., Inc.

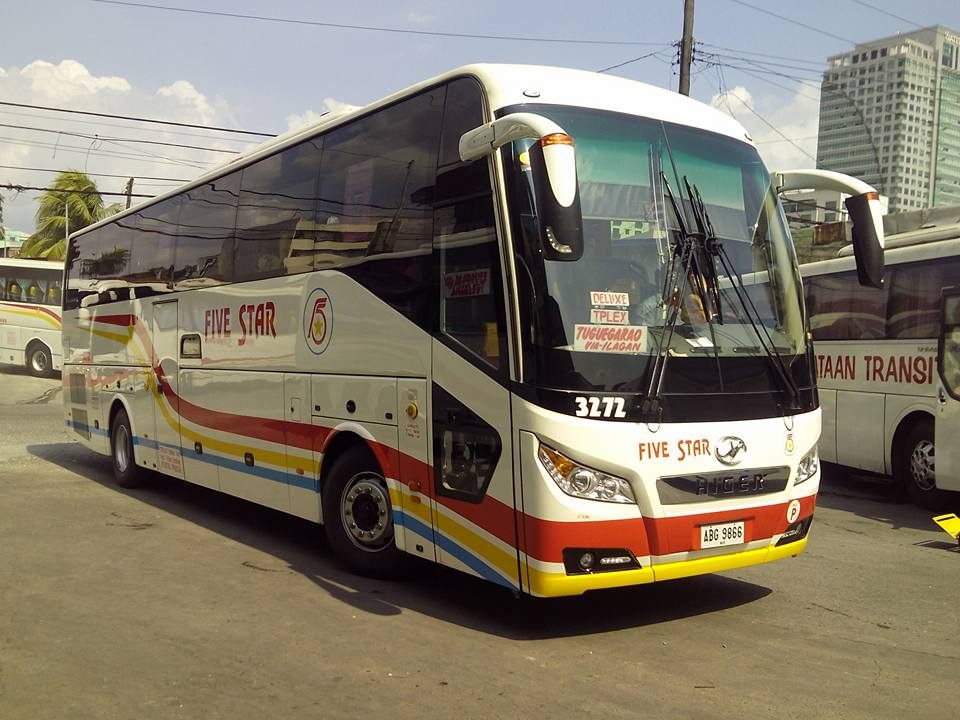
- A Five Star Bus departing in Cubao, Quezon City Bus Terminal
- Founded: 1983; 43 years ago
- Headquarters: 2220 Aurora Blvd., Tramo, Pasay, Philippines
- Locale: Northern and Central Luzon
- Service area: Metro Manila; Central Luzon; Pangasinan; Cagayan Valley
- Service type: Provincial Operation
- Fleet: 900+
- Operator: Pangasinan Five Star Bus Company, Inc.
- Chief executive: Cesar T. Hernandez
- Website: www.fivestarph.com

Pangasinan Five Star Bus Company, Inc. (FSBCI), or simply known as Five Star, is one of the largest bus companies in the Philippines. It serves routes mainly to the provinces of Pangasinan, Nueva Ecija, Tarlac, Nueva Vizcaya, Quirino, Isabela and Cagayan.

== History ==
Five Star was founded in 1983 in Metro Manila. It started as a city operation firm using ordinary fare buses, its main sister company is Victory Liner which is actually its parent. The Five Star Bus Company grew in the 90s, they started operations in Dagupan then later routes expanded to Cabanatuan, San Antonio, Tarlac City, Agno, Alaminos, Anda, Bolinao, San Carlos, Tayug, Santiago, Maddela, Piat, Tuguegarao and Solano, Nueva Vizcaya after the closure of Pangasinan Transportation Co., also known as Pantranco North Express Inc.

=== Bus Terminals ===
Five Star's headquarters in Pasay is one of its largest terminals, with destinations in Nueva Ecija and Pangasinan. Its Cubao terminal in Quezon City is large enough that three bus companies use it: Five Star, Bataan Transit and Luzon Cisco Transport. Five Star also has a terminal in Avenida Manila which has trips to Dagupan, San Carlos and Cagayan Valley (Santiago and Solano Trips only). It also has terminals in Cabanatuan, San Antonio, Bolinao, Alaminos, Pangasinan, Agno, Anda, San Carlos, Tayug, Santiago, Tuguegarao, Maddela, Piat and Solano.

== Fleet ==
Five Star Bus Company uses and maintains these bus units:

=== Current ===
Almazora Motors Corporation

- MAN R39 18.350 Tourist Star
- MAN R39 18.430 Tourist Star

Anhui Ankai Automobile Co., Ltd.

- Ankai HFF6121K40

Autodelta Coach Builders

- Volvo B7R (Autodelta 12-meter coach body)

Hino Motors Philippines

- Hino RM2PSS
- Hino RK1JST

Higer Bus Company Limited

- Higer V91 KLQ6119QE3
- Higer A80 KLQ6123K
- Higer A80 KLQ6128LQ
- Higer KLQ6127LA
- Higer KLQ6126LY

Hyundai Motor Company

- Hyundai Universe Space Luxury

King Long United Automotive Industry Co., Ltd

- King Long XMQ6118Y2

JAC Motors

- JAC Motors HK6124AM1

Santarosa Motor Works

- Santarosa Exfoh bus body
  - Nissan Diesel JA450SSN

Trans-Oriental Motor Builders Inc.

- MAN R39 18.350 (in Golden Dragon XML6127 bus body)

Zhengzhou Yutong Group Co., Ltd.

- Yutong ZK6128H

Modified & Custom-built buses by Five Star Bus Body:

- MAN R39 18.350 (Higer A80 replica)
- MAN R39 18.350 (Golden Dragon XML6126 replica)
- Hino RM2PSS
- Hino RK1JST
- Nissan Diesel JA450SSN
- Hyundai Aero Space LS
- Hyundai Universe Xpress
- Yutong ZK6107HA

=== Former ===
Almazora Motors Corporation

- MAN A55 18.310 Lion's Star

Hino Motors Philippines

- Hino Prisma bus body
  - Nissan Diesel JA520RAN
- Hino Grandtheater bus body
  - Hino RF

Hyundai Motor Company

- Hyundai Aero Space LS

Kia Motors Corporation

- Kia Granbird KM948 SD-II

Nissan Diesel Philippines Corporation

- Nissan Diesel Euro Trans bus body
  - Nissan Diesel RB46S
  - Nissan Diesel JA430SAN

Santarosa Motor Works

- Santarosa Euro bus body
  - Nissan Diesel RB46S
- Santarosa Exfoh bus body
  - Nissan Diesel RB46S
  - Nissan Diesel RB46SR
- Santarosa Modulo bus body
  - MAN A83 14.280

Zhengzhou Yutong Group Co., Ltd.

- Yutong ZK6100H
- Yutong ZK6119HA

Modified & Custom-built buses by Five Star Bus Body:

- Nissan Diesel RB46S
- Nissan Diesel RB46SR
- MAN A83 14.280

== Terminals ==
=== Metro Manila ===
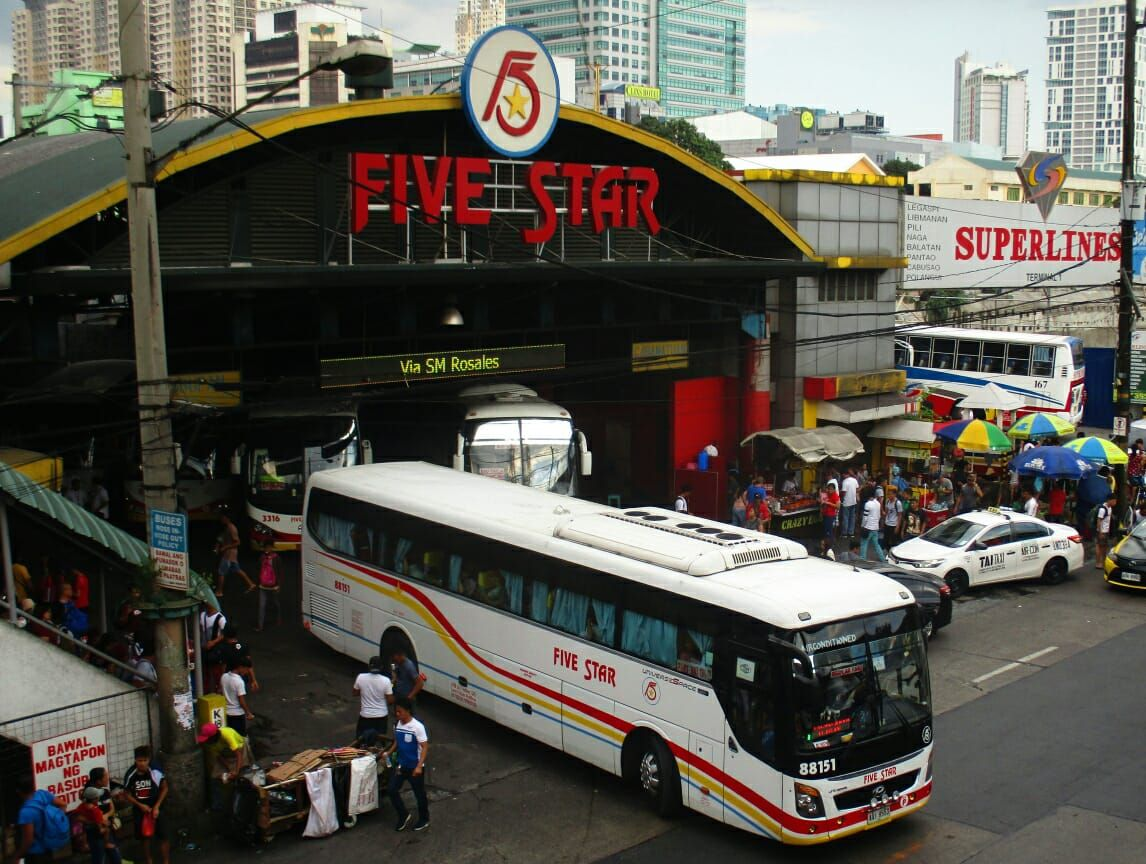
Five Star Bus in Cubao EDSA Quezon City.

- Cubao - EDSA Cubao, Quezon City
- Pasay - Aurora Blvd., Pasay (headquarters of Five Star)
- Caloocan - Rizal Avenue Extension, Grace Park, Caloocan City
- Avenida - Doroteo Jose St., Sta. Cruz, Manila (Bataan Transit Terminal)

=== Provincial ===
==== Cagayan Valley Region ====
- Cagayan
  - Tuguegarao - Balzain Highway, Tuguegarao, Cagayan
  - Piat - Brgy. Poblacion I, Piat, Cagayan
- Nueva Vizcaya
  - Solano - Brgy. Poblacion North, Solano, Nueva Vizcaya
- Isabela
  - Santiago - Brgy. Calao East, Santiago, Isabela
  - Angadanan - ISELCO III Angadanan, Isabela
- Quirino
  - Maddela - Brgy. Poblacion Sur, Maddela, Qurino

==== Central Luzon Region ====
- Nueva Ecija
  - Cabanatuan - Cabanatuan Central Terminal, Brgy. Padre Crisostomo, Cabanatuan, Nueva Ecija
  - Cabanatuan - Zulueta St., Cabanatuan, Nueva Ecija
  - San Antonio - Brgy. Poblacion, San Antonio, Nueva Ecija
  - San Jose City - Bonifacio Street, Brgy. Rafael Rueda Sr., San Jose City, Nueva Ecija
- Tarlac
  - Tarlac City - Siesta Bus Stop, Zamora St., Tarlac City, Tarlac
- Pampanga
  - Angeles City - Marquee Mall Bus Terminal, Marquee Mall, Angeles City, Pampanga
  - Mabalacat - Dau Bus Terminal, Mabalacat, Pampanga

==== Ilocos Region ====
- Pangasinan
  - Agno - Brgy. Poblacion East, Agno, Pangasinan
  - Alaminos - Quezon Ave., Alaminos, Pangasinan
  - Anda - Brgy. Poblacion, Anda, Pangasinan
  - Bolinao - Poblacion Road, Bolinao, Pangasinan
  - Dagupan - Perez Blvd., Dagupan, Pangasinan
  - San Carlos - Rizal Ave., San Carlos, Pangasinan
  - Tayug - Mabini St., Tayug, Pangasinan

== Former Terminal ==
=== Metro Manila ===
- Sampaloc - Legarda Street, Sampaloc, Manila (Terminal was acquired again by Bicol Isarog Transport System)

== Subsidiaries and sister companies ==
- Victory Liner
- First North Luzon Transit
- Bataan Transit
- Bicol Isarog Transport System
- Luzon Cisco Transport
- Laguna Star Bus Transport System (operated by First North Luzon Transit)
- Citybus Inc. (operated by First North Luzon Transit)
- First Metro Bus Express Inc. (operated by First North Luzon Transit)
- Maria de Leon Transportation (operated by Bataan Transit)
- RJ Express

== See also ==
- GV Florida Transport
- List of bus companies of the Philippines
- Baliwag Transit
