= Balungao =

Municipality in Pangasinan, Philippines

- Municipality
- Municipality of Balungao
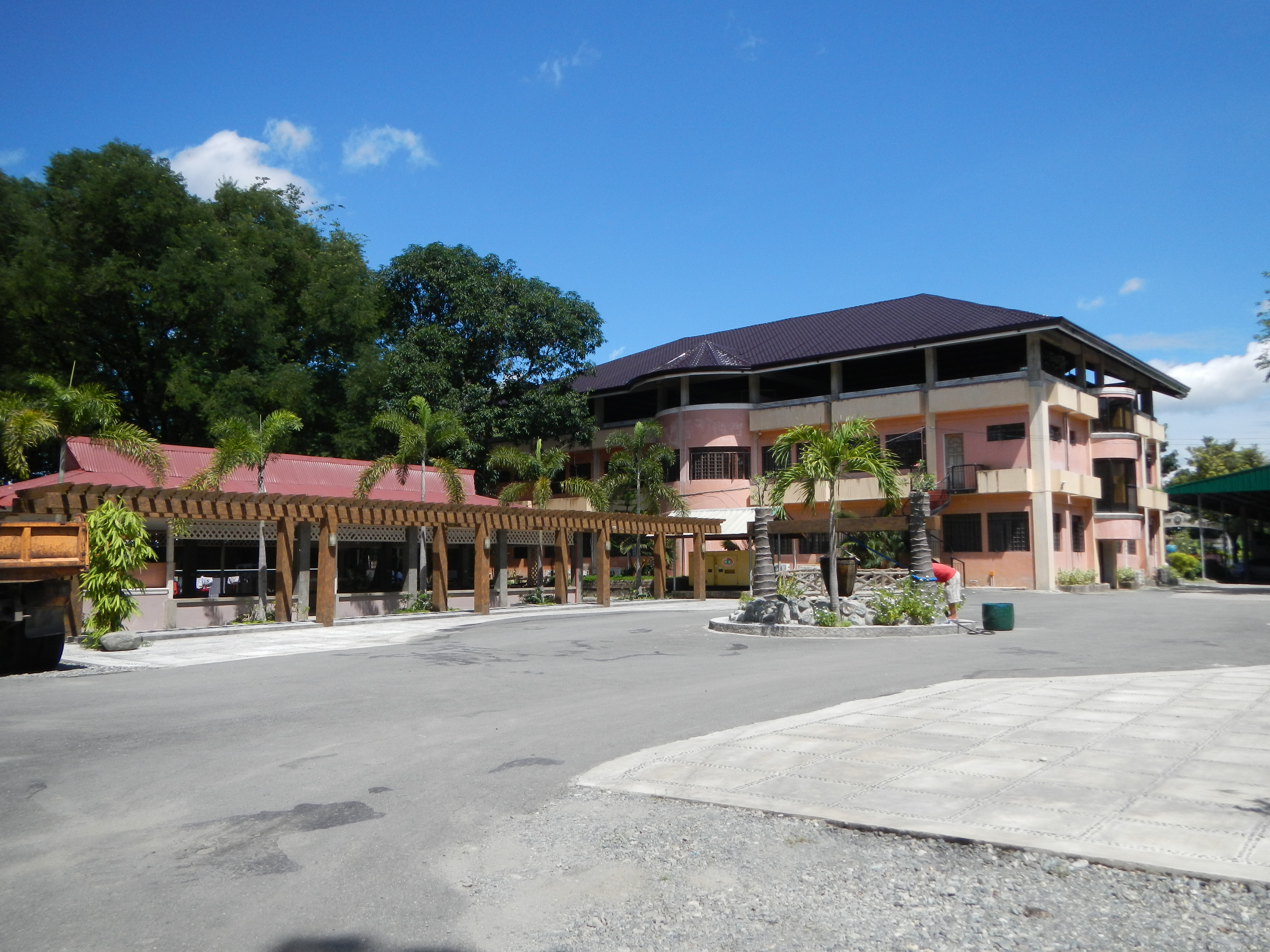
- Balungao Town Hall

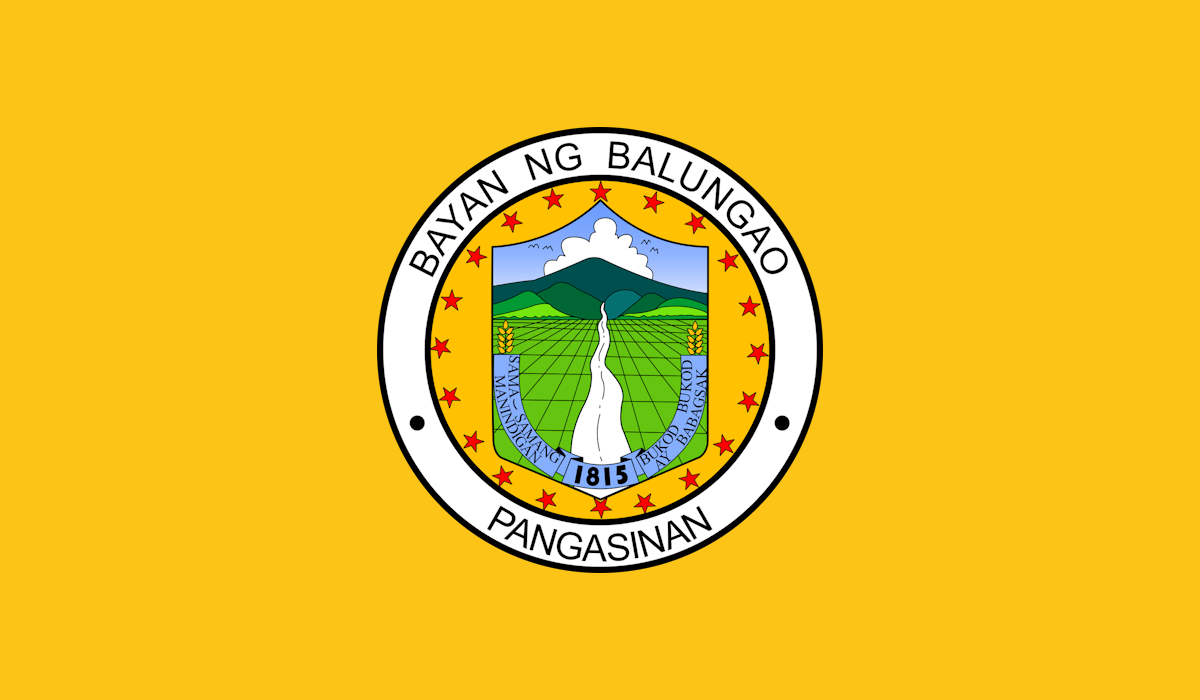
- Flag Seal

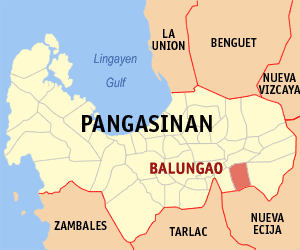
- Map of Pangasinan with Balungao highlighted
- Interactive map of Balungao
- Location within the Philippines
- Coordinates: 15°54′N 120°42′E
- Country: Philippines
- Region: Ilocos Region
- Province: Pangasinan
- District: 6th district
- Founded: March 19, 1815
- Annexation to Rosales: October 8, 1903
- Chartered: October 31, 1906
- Named for: Mount Balungao
- Barangays: 21 (see Barangays)

Government
  - Type: Sangguniang Bayan
  - Mayor: Maria Theresa R. Peralta
  - Vice Mayor: Philipp D. Peralta
  - Representative: Marlyn Primicias-Agabas
  - Municipal Council: Members: Jose T. Peralta III; Wilfredo N. Mina; Marlon V. Guerzo; Pastor S. Tabrilla; Crisanto M. Luna; Salvador M. Alejandro; Joseph N. Pascua; Roderick M. Soriano
  - Electorate: 21,533 voters (2025)

Area
  - Total: 73.25 km^{2} (28.28 sq mi)
- Elevation: 50 m (160 ft)
- Highest elevation: 382 m (1,253 ft)
- Lowest elevation: 29 m (95 ft)

Population (2024 census)
  - Total: 30,678
  - Density: 418.8/km^{2} (1,085/sq mi)
  - Households: 7,908

Economy
  - Income class: 1st municipal income class
  - Poverty incidence: 10.74% (2023)
  - Revenue: ₱ 235.9 million (2024)
  - Assets: ₱ 874.4 million (2024)
  - Expenditure: ₱ 176.7 million (2024)
  - Liabilities: ₱ 38.94 million (2024)

Service provider
  - Electricity: Pangasinan 3 Electric Cooperative (PANELCO 3)
- Time zone: UTC+8 (PST)
- ZIP code: 2442
- PSGC: 0105507000
- IDD : area code: +63 (0)75
- Native languages: Pangasinan; Ilocano; Tagalog

Balungao, officially the Municipality of Balungao (Pangasinan: Baley na Balungao; Ilocano: Ili ti Balungao; Tagalog: Bayan ng Balungao), is a municipality in the province of Pangasinan, Philippines. According to the 2024 census, it has a population of 30,678 people.

== Etymology ==
According to local folklore, the municipality derived its name from a beautiful young widow in the area whom residents called “Balun-ugaw”, a Pangasinense word for "young widow/widower". That moniker eventually evolved phonetically into "Balungao."

== History ==
=== Early settlers ===
The town of Balungao was first inhabited by nomadic people who found their way to the area from the Ilocos region through San Fabian, Pangasinan. They were farmers looking a place in which to settle and engage in agriculture to survive. Its origin is evident in the fact that Balungao is one of the Ilocano-speaking towns in the province where the primary language is Pangasinense. Some Tagalogs from Bulacan & Nueva Ecija also migrated into the town after some time.

=== Foundation ===
Balungao was originally called Panaclaban and was a part of Cuyapo town in the adjacent province of Nueva Ecija until the latter part of 18th century. It was annexed to the town of Rosales (then a town of Nueva Ecija) in the early part of 19th century because of its geographic location. It officially became an independent municipality in 1815, and, along with Rosales, was transferred to Pangasinan. From 1903 to 1906, Balungao was integrated once again into the town of Rosales.

On April 25, 1993, Balungao Mayor Jose C. Peralta was assassinated while he was attending a Catholic Mass with his family at the local church.

== Geography ==
The Municipality of Balungao is located in the south-eastern part of the province bordering the province of Nueva Ecija to the south. It is partially urban community with an area of 7,325 hectares (18,100 acres).

Balungao is situated 70.88 kilometers (44.04 mi) from the provincial capital Lingayen, and 178.19 kilometers (110.72 mi) from the country's capital city of Manila.

=== Barangays ===
Balungao is politically subdivided into 20 barangays. Each barangay consists of puroks and some have sitios.

- Angayan Norte
- Angayan Sur
- Capulaan
- Esmeralda
- Kita-kita
- Mabini
- Mauban
- Poblacion
- Pugaro
- Rajal
- San Andres
- San Aurelio 1st
- San Aurelio 2nd
- San Aurelio 3rd
- San Joaquin
- San Julian
- San Leon
- San Marcelino
- San Miguel
- San Raymundo

=== Climate ===
Climate data for Balungao, Pangasinan
Month	Jan	Feb	Mar	Apr	May	Jun	Jul	Aug	Sep	Oct	Nov	Dec	Year
Mean daily maximum °C (°F)	29 (84)	29 (84)	30 (86)	32 (90)	33 (91)	33 (91)	33 (91)	33 (91)	34 (93)	32 (90)	31 (88)	29 (84)	32 (89)
Mean daily minimum °C (°F)	21 (70)	21 (70)	22 (72)	23 (73)	24 (75)	24 (75)	24 (75)	24 (75)	23 (73)	23 (73)	22 (72)	21 (70)	23 (73)
Average precipitation mm (inches)	127.5 (5.02)	115.8 (4.56)	129.7 (5.11)	141.1 (5.56)	248.2 (9.77)	165 (6.5)	185.3 (7.30)	161.9 (6.37)	221.4 (8.72)	299.5 (11.79)	199 (7.8)	188.7 (7.43)	2,183.1 (85.93)
Average rainy days	17	17	17	15	20	19	19	20	21	20	17	19	221
Source: World Weather Online

== Demographics ==
Population census of Balungao
Year	Pop.	±% p.a.
1903	5,853	—
1918	8,515	+2.53%
1939	10,912	+1.19%
1948	12,773	+1.77%
1960	13,184	+0.26%
1970	14,989	+1.29%
1975	16,745	+2.25%
1980	17,342	+0.70%
1990	21,473	+2.16%
1995	21,274	−0.17%
2000	23,813	+2.45%
2007	25,214	+0.79%
2010	26,678	+2.08%
2015	31,106	+2.97%
2020	30,004	−0.76%
2024	30,678	+0.53%
Source: Philippine Statistics Authority

== Economy ==
Poverty incidence of Balungao (%)

Source: Philippine Statistics Authority

== Government ==
=== Local government ===
Balungao, belonging to the sixth congressional district of the province of Pangasinan, is governed by a mayor designated as its local chief executive and by a municipal council as its legislative body in accordance with the Local Government Code. The mayor, vice mayor, and the councilors are elected directly by the people through an election which is being held every three years.

=== Elected officials ===
Members of the Municipal Council (2022–2025)
Position	Name
Congressman	Marlyn Primicias-Agabas
Mayor	Maria Theresa R. Peralta
Vice-Mayor	Philipp D. Peralta
Councilors	John Willie "Kuya Will" B. Mina
Councilors	Jose T. "Jops" Peralta III
Councilors	Darius A. "Cardo" Nava
Councilors	Beatriz D. "Bating" Ligero
Councilors	Gerry G. "Ger" Luna
Councilors	Krisanto M. "Kris" Luna
Councilors	Roderick M. "Ago" Soriano
Councilors	Roozemond S. "Ice Mango" Peralta

== Tourism ==
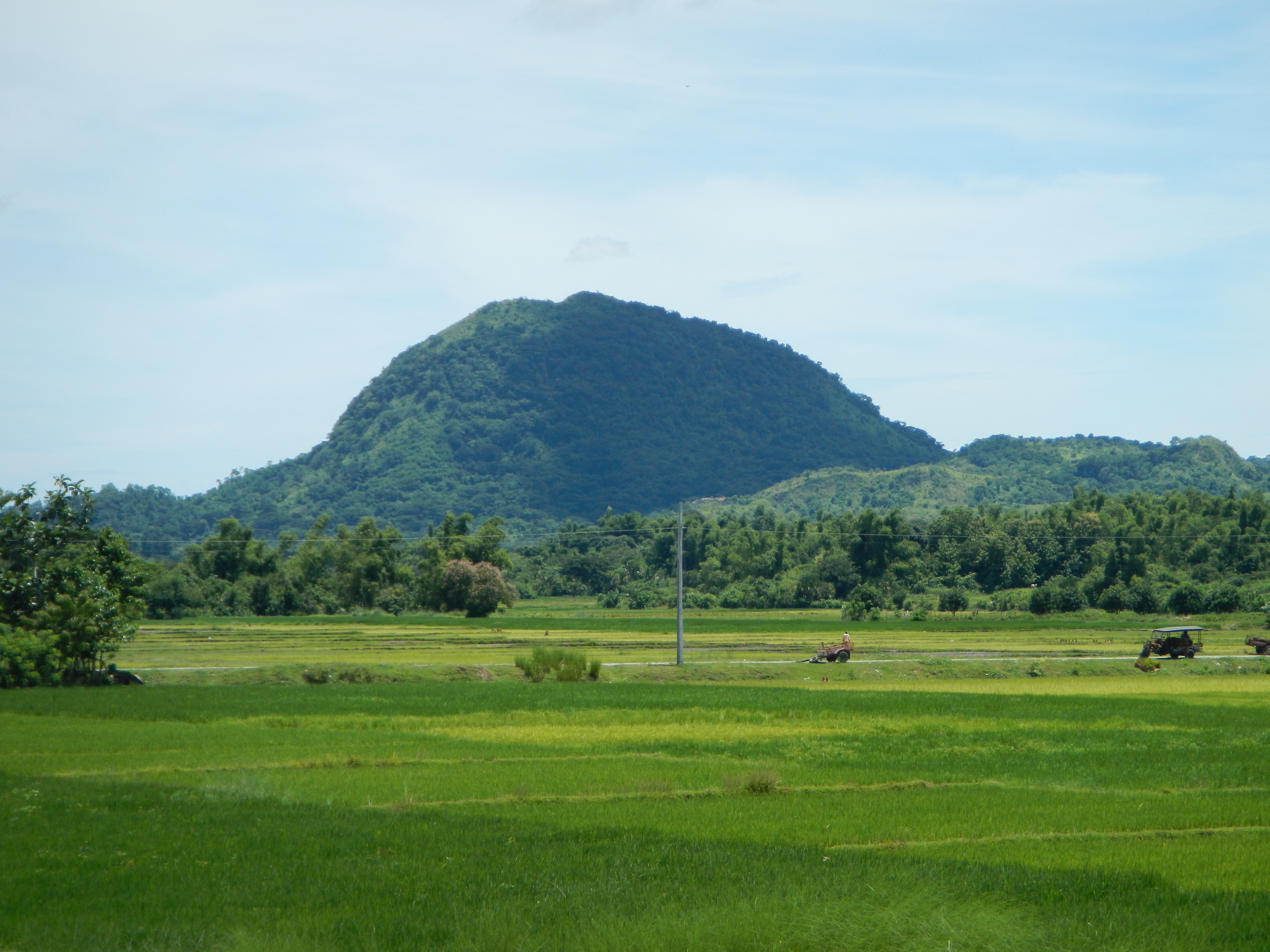
Mount Balungao

=== Mount Balungao ===
Mount Balungao (15°51′44.90″N 120°40′57.70″E) is an extinct volcano, 382 metres (1,253 ft) ASL located in the municipality of Balungao. Its volcanic past is manifested by its physical profile and the presence of hot and cold springs. The Philippine Institute of Volcanology and Seismology (PHIVOLCS) lists Mount Balungao as an inactive volcano.

=== Balungao Hilltop Adventure ===
Balungao opened its doors to adventure travel tourism with the opening of Balungao Hilltop Adventure (15°52′2″N 120°41′10″E) on September 8, 2011. Located at the foot of Mount Balungao, the resort was constructed by the municipal government of Balungao and boasts the 2nd longest Zip-line in the Philippines (2011) at 600 metres (2,000 ft) long. The Balungao Hilltop Adventure also offers ATV or quad bike adventure, bungee trampoline, biking, mountain climbing, and the refurbished hot and cold spring swimming pools.

It originally started as the Mt. Balungao Hot and Cold Springs Resort under the administration of then Mayor Jose G. Peralta Jr. It was not until 2011, under the administration of the Mayor Philipp G. Peralta, that it was repackaged for adventure travelers.

==== Longest zipline in Pangasinan ====
Balungao Hilltop Adventure offers a Zip Line with a length 600 meters (2,000 ft) which could last from 15 seconds to a minute depending on your weight and your position when you are suspended at the Zip Line. It begins from a Hill, overlooking the valley passing through another hill down to the Balungao Hot and Cold Spring Resort. It is considered as the longest Zip line in Pangasinan

== Education ==
The Balungao Schools District Office governs all educational institutions within the municipality. It oversees the management and operations of all private and public elementary and high schools.

=== Primary and elementary schools ===
- Balungao Central School
- Capulaan Elementary School
- Don Francisco D. Toliao Elementary School
- Esmeralda Elementary School
- Irenio L. Guieb Sr. Elementary School
- Kita-Kita Elementary School
- Mabini Elementary School
- Mauban Elementary School
- Pugaro Elementary School
- Rajal-Angayan Elementary School
- San Andres Elementary School
- San Aurelio Elementary School
- San Aurelio 3rd Elementary School
- San Joaquin Elementary School
- San Julian Elementary School
- San Leon Elementary School
- San Marcelino Elementary School
- San Raymundo Elementary School
- UCCP N-K and Grade School

=== Secondary schools ===
- Balungao Central High School
- Balungao National High School
- Rajal-Angayan National High School
- Remnant International School
- San Aurelio National High School
- San Leon National High School

== See also ==
- List of inactive volcanoes in the Philippines
