= Baliwag Transit =

Bus company in the Philippines

Baliwag Transit, Inc.

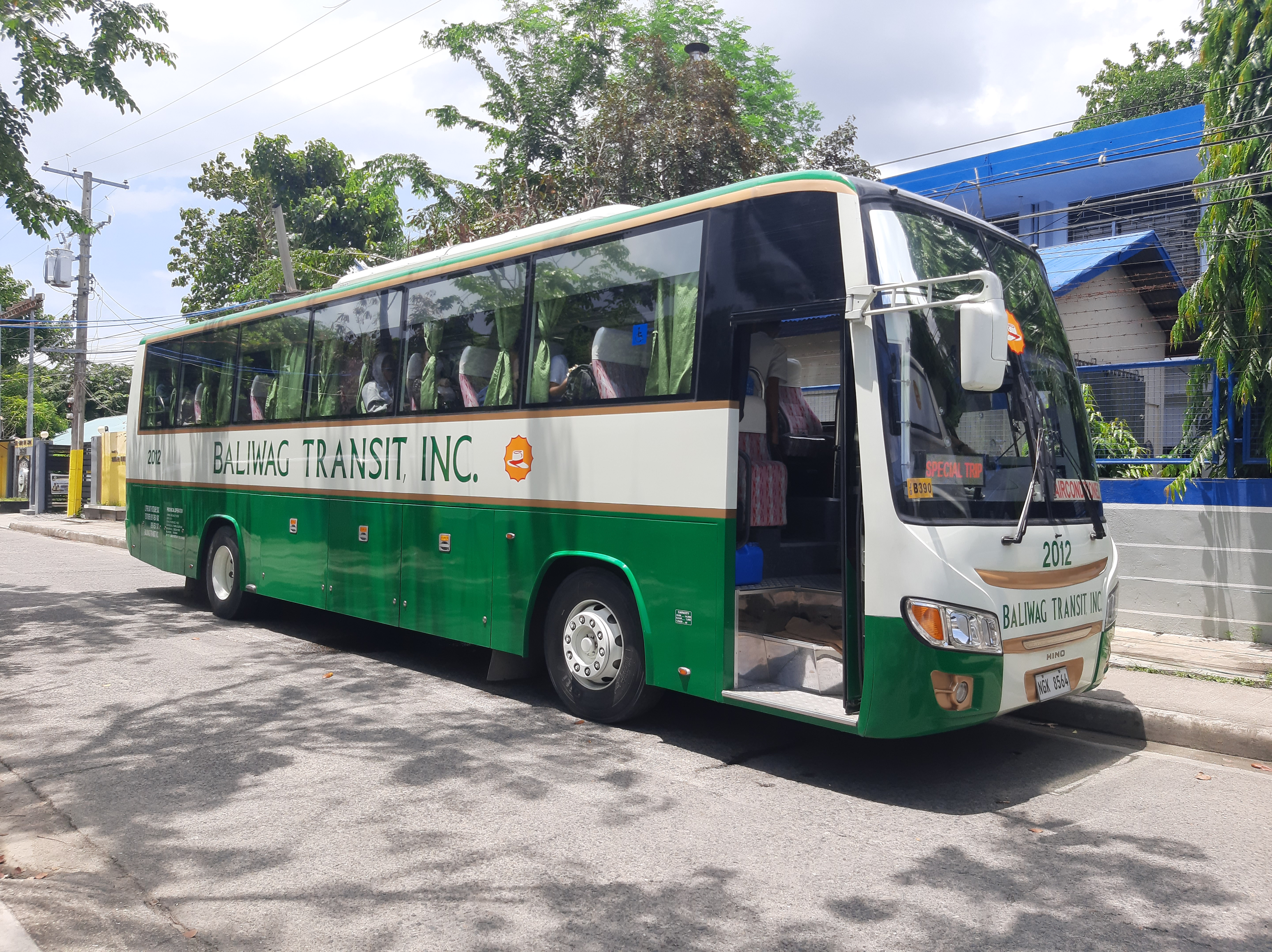
- A Baliwag Transit bus
- Founded: 1960; 66 years ago
- Headquarters: Sabang, Baliwag, Bulacan, Philippines
- Service area: Central Luzon; Pangasinan; Metro Manila
- Service type: Provincial Operation
- Alliance: Golden Bee Transport and Logistics, Inc.
- Hubs: Cubao
- Fleet: 600+
- Operator: Baliwag Transit, Inc.
- Website: baliwagtransit.webs.com

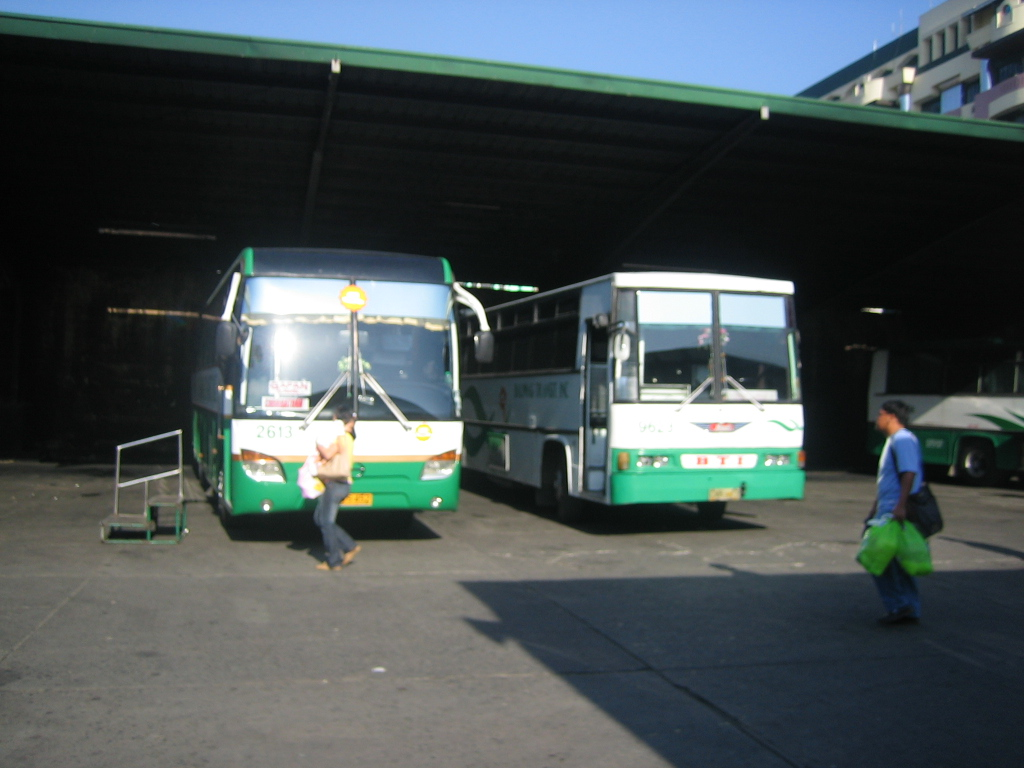
Bus Terminal in Caloocan

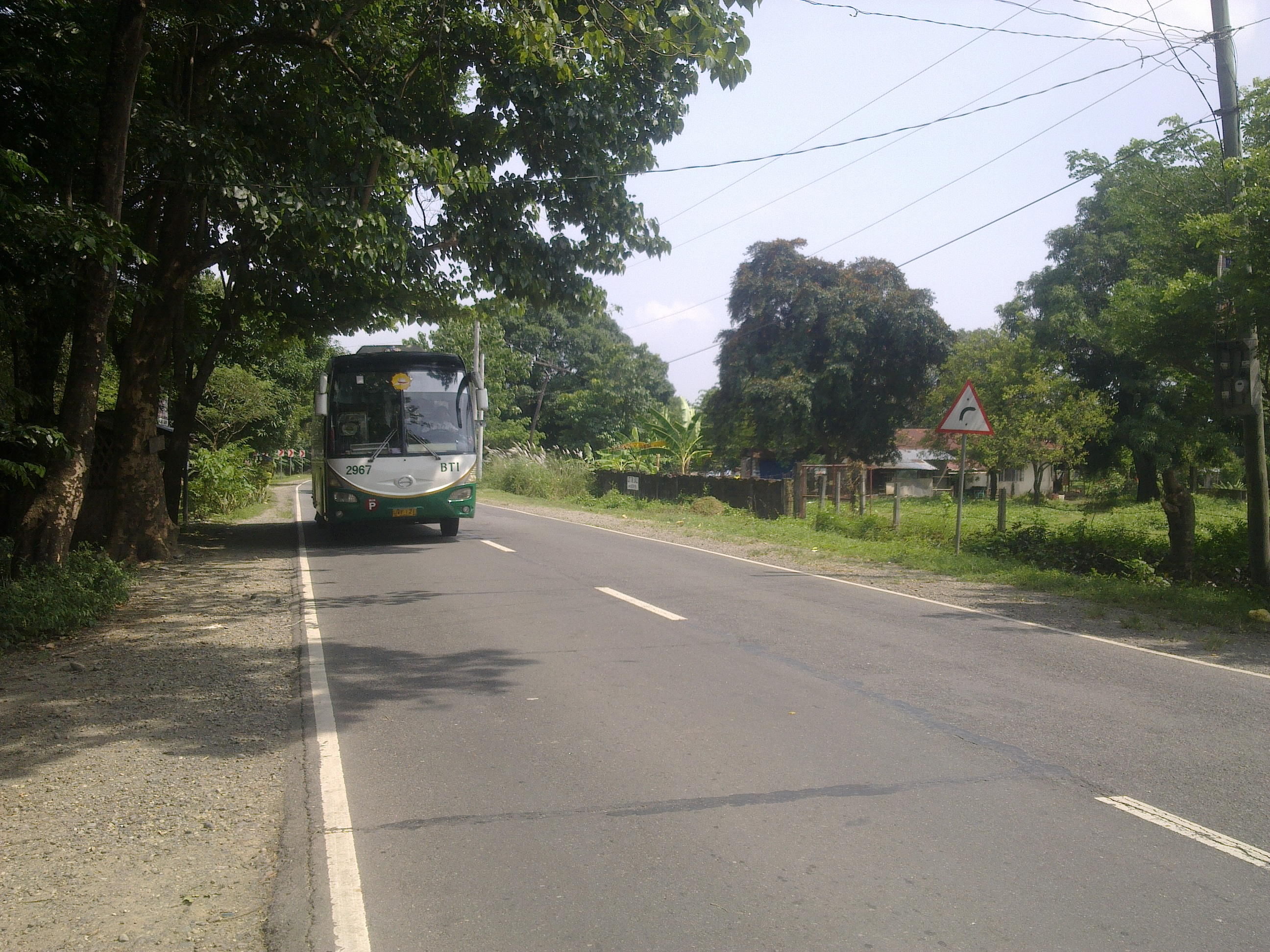
Baliwag Transit, Inc. 2967 in San Jose

Baliwag Transit is one of the major bus companies in the Philippines with offices and terminals in various parts of Luzon that mainly services routes to and from Metro Manila and Central Luzon. It is named after the city of Baliwag, Bulacan, where it originated.

== History ==
Baliwag Transit, Inc. was established as a sole proprietorship by the late matriarch Doña Maria Victoria Santiago Vda. de Tengco (born on November 17, 1923, popularly known in Baliwag as "Viuda" or "Nanay Turing"), a native of Baliwag and Hagonoy, Bulacan. Prior to the establishment of the bus company in the 1960s, she had a hat business in Baliwag, this becoming the source of the logo of the bus company.

In 1954, The High Tribunal's CJ Ricardo Paras affirmed the judgment of the Public Service Commission (created under Commonwealth Act No. 146), which granted Doña Maria Victoria Santiago Vda. de Tengco's Certificate of Public convenience application to operate 6 passenger and cargo buses in the San Miguel, Bulacan-Manila route. It dismissed the certiorari petitions of defendants Angat-Manila Transportation Co., Inc., Pampanga Bus Co., Nicolas Javier, Bachrach Motor Co., Gaudencio Nicolas, Enrique de Leon and Valentin Fernando. Victorio Tengco is also the President of Baliwag Navigation, Inc. a manning agency at Victoria Building, 429 United Nations Avenue, Ermita, Manila.

In 2021, BTI union leader Jose Abenales and 47 unpaid workers filed complaints of unpaid wages against BTI, which agreed to settle the case amicably. During the COVID-19 pandemic in the Philippines and pending the cases settlement, tragedy struct the owners of the Transit.

On August 19, 2020, 49-year-old Sir Knight Jorge Allan Rodriguez Tengco, Bulacan Tourism Council chairman died of Heart failure. He is the eldest child of Papal Dame Amelita Rustia Rodriguez and Joselito Santiago Tengco, brother of former Baliwag Mayor from 1994 to 1998, Edilberto Santiago Tengco. On September 12, BTI company manager 74-year-old Joselito Santiago Tengco died. On January 8, 2022, Joselito's younger brother, 73-year-old Mayor Edilberto S. Tengco died. On March 20, Doña Maria Victoria Santiago Vda. de Tengco's—the family matriarch also died.

Initially, BTI suffered financial losses due to cut throat competition with the City Bus and PBC (Pedro B. Cruz). In 1966-1967 when Tengco acquired PBC formerly City Bus franchise and the lines of the Victory Liner lines from Nueva Ecija. VLI and BTI operated over 200 buses along the Bulacan-Nueva Ecija-Manila route. Industrial Finance Corporation funded franchises and MAN Diesel purchases. Baliwag Transit, Inc. was incorporated in 1968. The company grew as years went by and became a member of the Baliwag Group of Companies, currently, the Tengco Group of Companies. BTIs holding company includes The Tengco Group of Stores, which is the umbrella of Tengcos' Jollibee, Mang Inasal, Red Ribbon Bakeshop and Chowking both in Bulacan and Baliwag Marketing Co., Inc.

The children and grandchildren of Doña Victoria continued to own and manage the company and was presided by her eldest son, Joselito S. Tengco until his death in 2021. In 2022, Doña Amelita "Amy" Rustia Rodriguez Tengco, her daughter Maria Victoria “Vic” Rodriguez Tengco-Burgos and husband Mark Torres Burgos co-manage BTI and Tengco Group of Companies. Doña Amelita Rustia Rodriguez Tengco, the daughter of the late Nene Rodriguez is the sibling of Don Romy Rustia Rodriguez and the late Danilo Nilo Rustia Rodriguez, the son-in-law of the late philanthropist, Engineer Ireneo "Mangge" S. Villangca. Don Reginaldo "Rehe" Rustia Rodriguez died in July 2024.

== Stations and vehicles ==
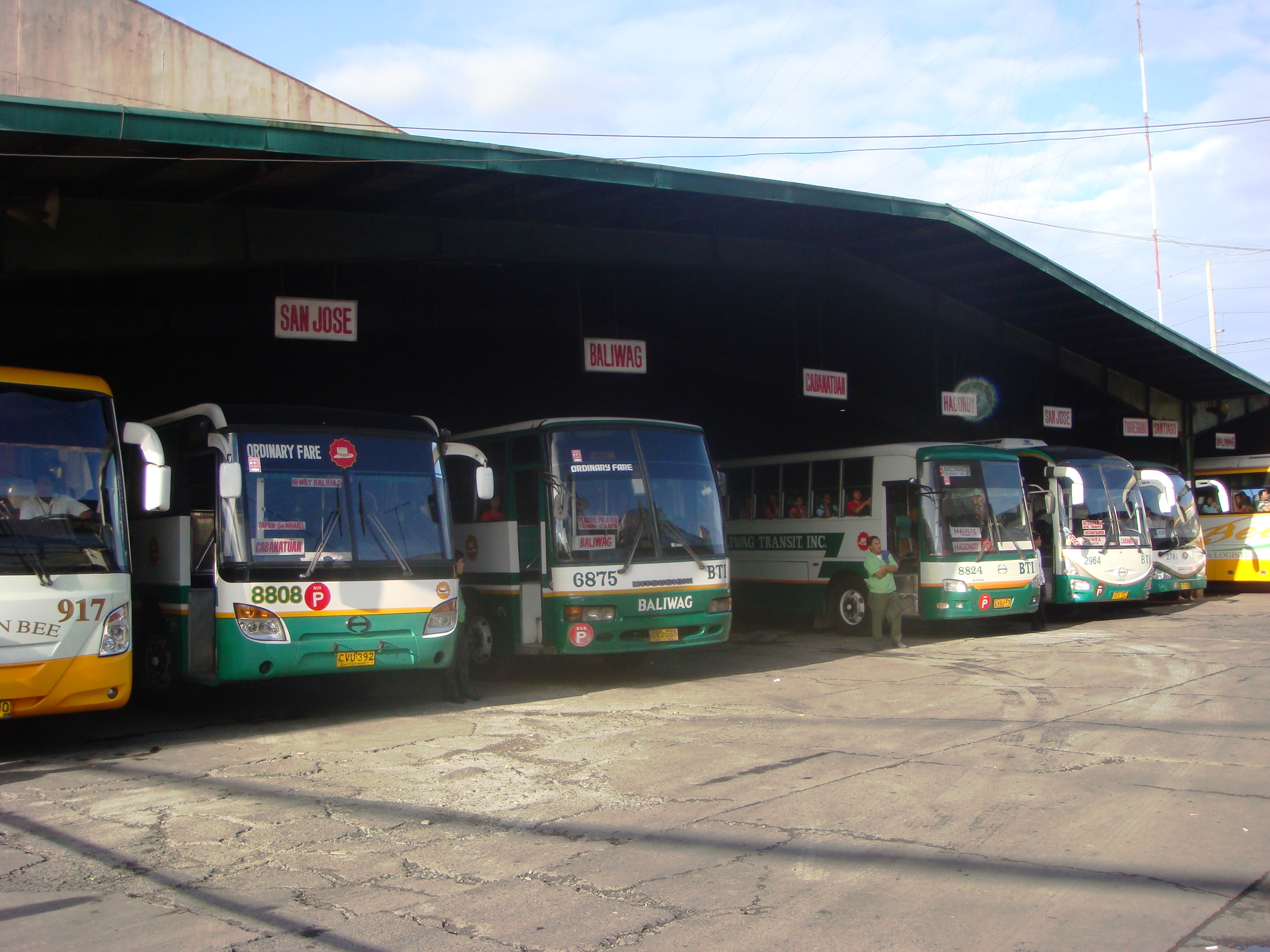
Fleet of buses (including sister company's Golden Bee) at Baliwag Transit Bus Terminal (Cubao, Quezon City)

Like other bus companies in the Philippines with exclusive terminals, Baliwag Transit, Inc. has its own stations like in the city of San Jose and Cabanatuan, Nueva Ecija, also in Baliwag, Malolos and Hagonoy, Bulacan and in Metro Manila like Cubao, Quezon City and Grace Park, Caloocan. These are located in vital points along the bus routes, where potential passengers can easily converge for boarding.

In 2009, Baliwag Transit opened a subsidiary company, Golden Bee Transport and Logistics Corp., which services the routes Pasay-Cubao to Baliwag, Cabanatuan, and San Jose, Nueva Ecija, and vice versa.

They opened their Pasay Terminal in Zone 16, Don Carlos St., Brgy. 164, Pasay on December 14, 2014, owned by the Baliwag Transit and their sister company, Golden Bee Transport and Logistics Corporation.

Baliwag Transit, Inc. and Golden Bee Transport and Logistics Corp. is utilizing Hino, Nissan Diesel, Daewoo, King Long, Higer, Iveco, MAN, and Mitsubishi Fuso as their current and historical units.

== Fare classes ==
- Ordinary fare (3x2 seating; 61 to 66 passenger seats)
- Regular air conditioned (2x2 seating; 49 to 53 passenger seats, and 3x2 seating; 56 to 66 passenger seats)

== Destinations ==
=== Metro Manila ===
- Grace Park, Caloocan via NLEX Harbor Link
- Cubao, Quezon City via Mindanao Avenue
- Divisoria, Manila
- Parañaque Integrated Terminal Exchange via Skyway Balintawak On-Ramp Exit/Entry Sucat Interchange

=== Bulacan ===
- Baliwag
- Hagonoy
- Angat via Plaridel / Bustos
- San Miguel (Camias / Sibul)
- Meycauayan
- Malolos
- Pulilan
- Calumpit
- Guiguito
- Marilao

=== Pampanga ===
- Candaba (Bahay Pare) via Baliwag
- San Luis
- San Fernando
- San Simon
- Dau bus terminal (Mabalacat)
- Santa Rita

=== Nueva Ecija ===
- Cabanatuan via NLEX Sta Rita Exit or SCTEX Tarlac City Exit
- San Jose via NLEX Sta Rita Exit or SCTEX Tarlac City Exit
- Cuyapo
- Papaya / General Tinio
- Licab
- Pantabangan
- Rizal
- San Antonio
- Muñoz
- Talugtug
- Bongabon
- Talavera
- Peñaranda

=== Aurora ===
- Dingalan

=== Pangasinan ===
- San Quintin via Cabanatuan / San Jose

== Former destinations ==
- Tuguegarao, Cagayan
- Jones, Isabela
- Santiago, Isabela
- Tarlac City
- Aritao, Nueva Vizcaya
- Solano, Nueva Vizcaya
- Aparri, Cagayan
- Guagua via Tabang

== Gallery ==
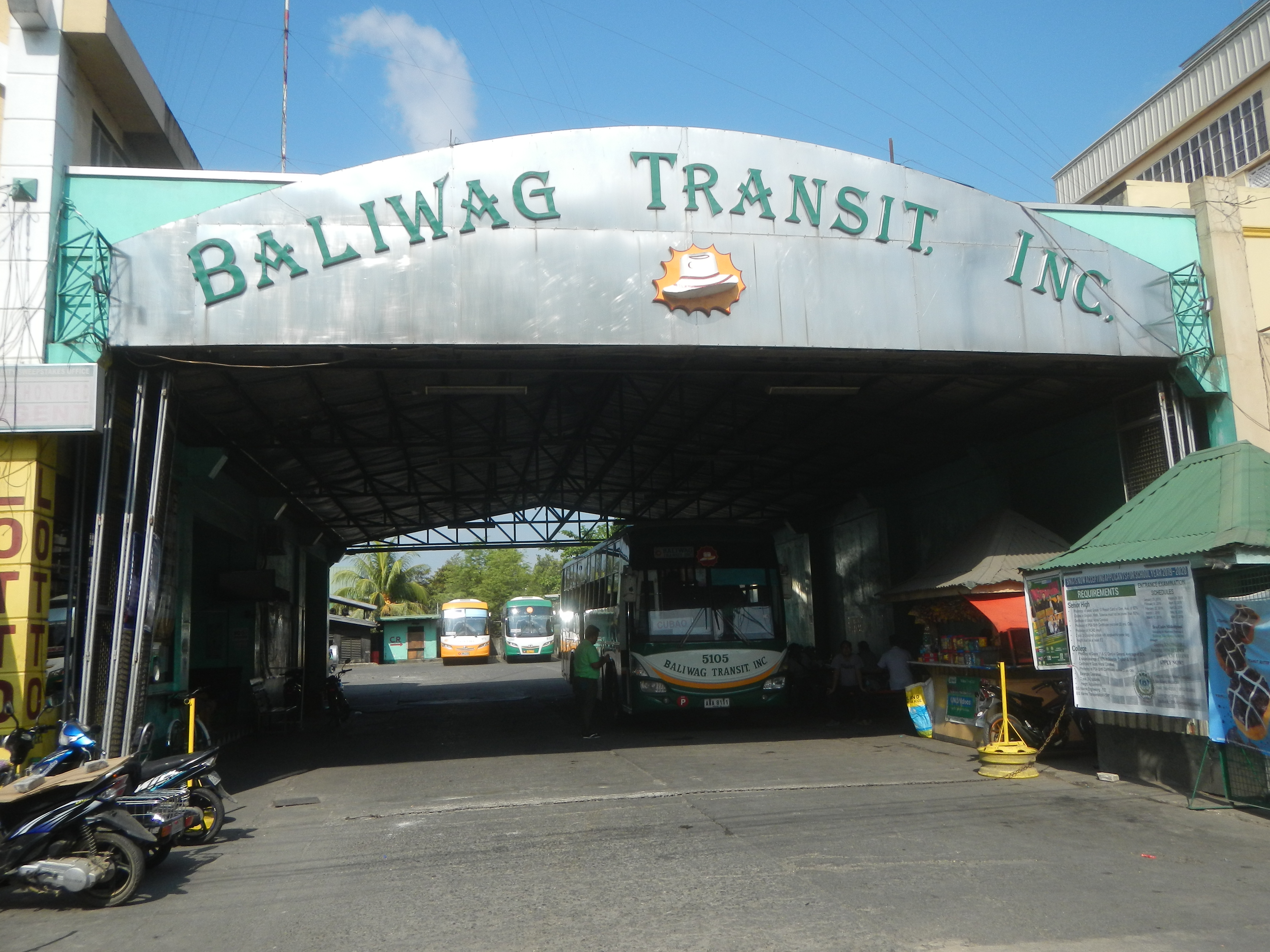
Baliwag Transit Ordinary bus terminal in Poblacion, Baliwag, Bulacan

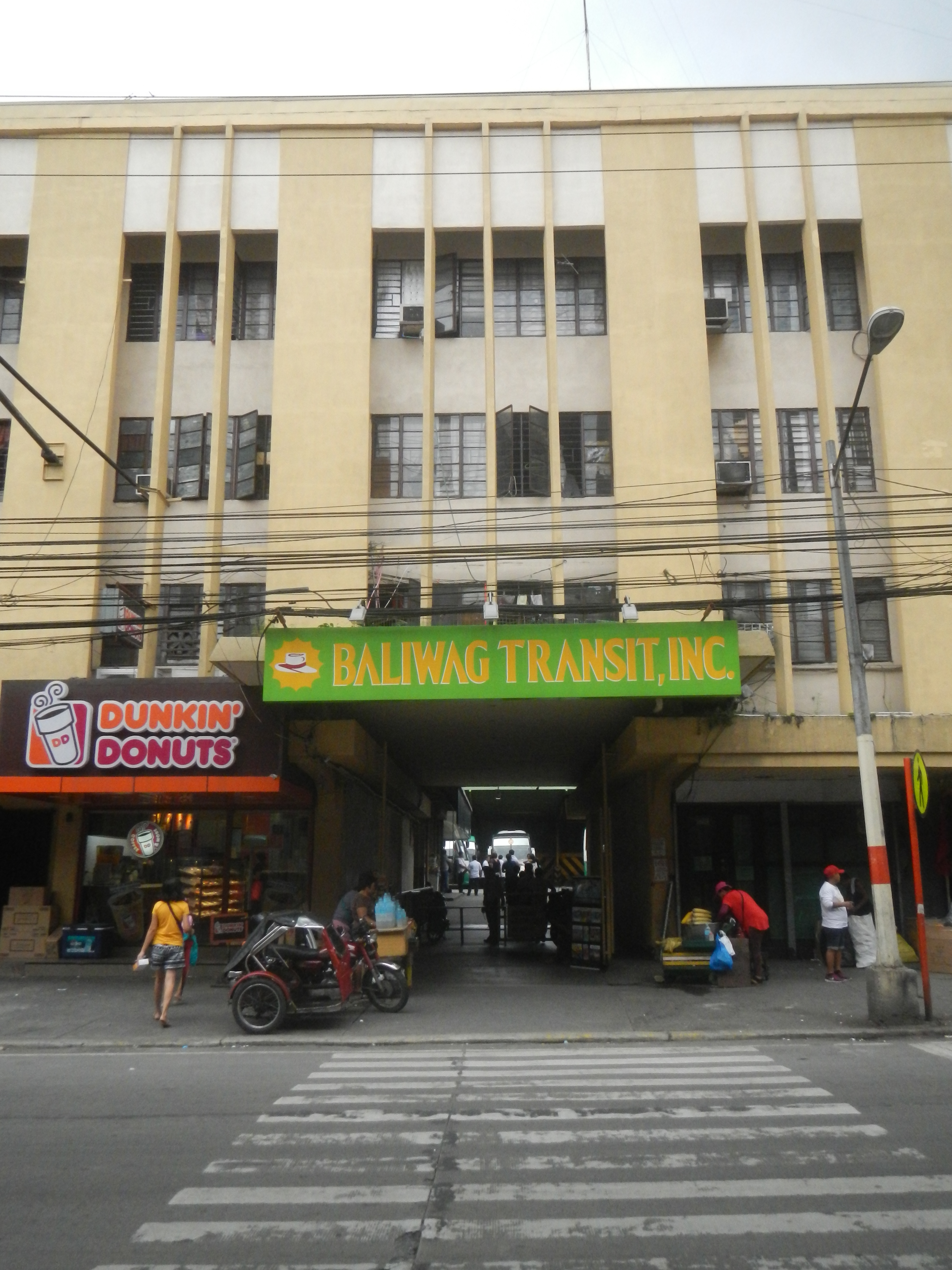
Baliwag Transit bus terminal in Grace Park, Caloocan City

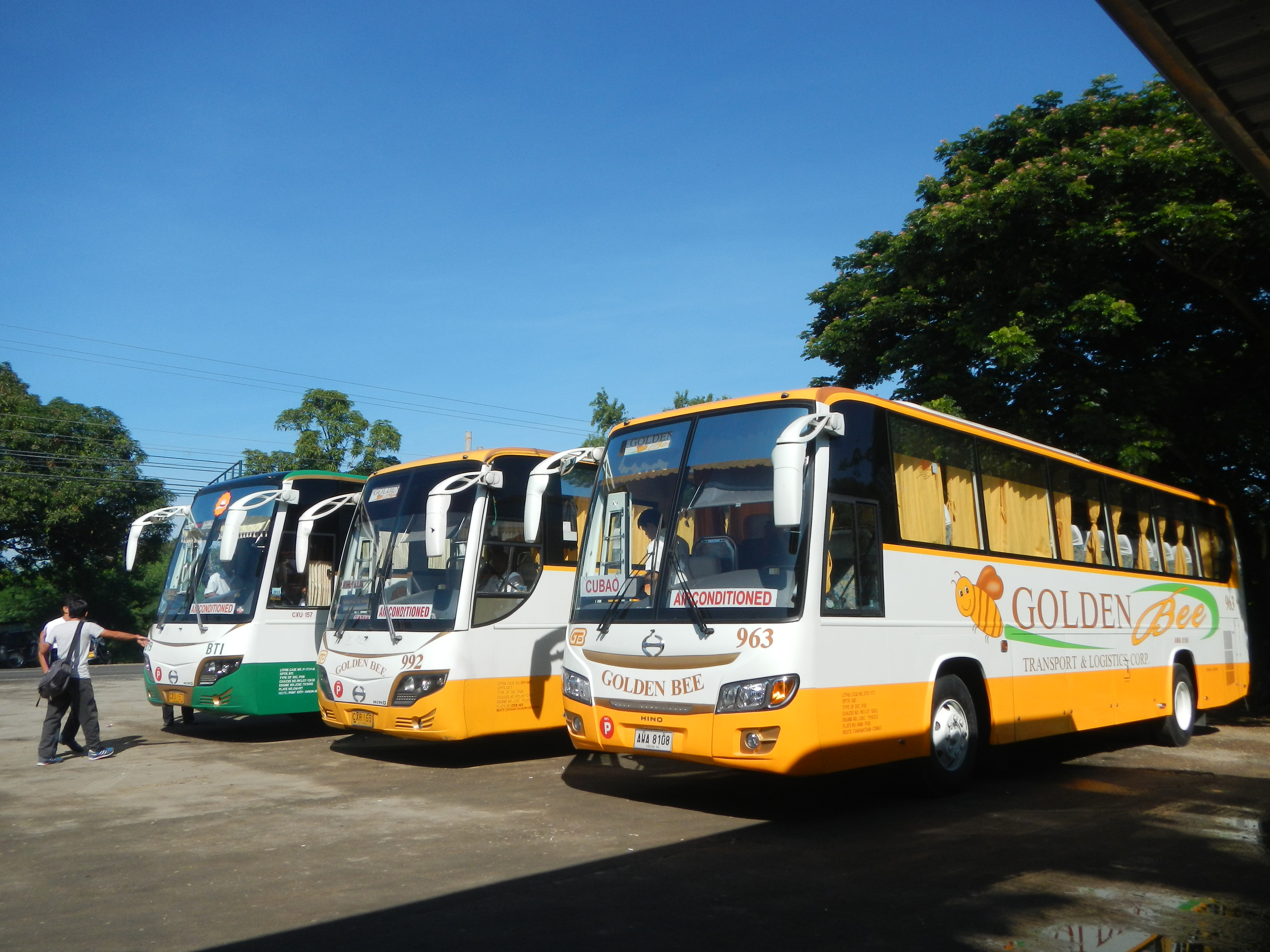
Baliwag Transit bus stop in San Miguel, Bulacan

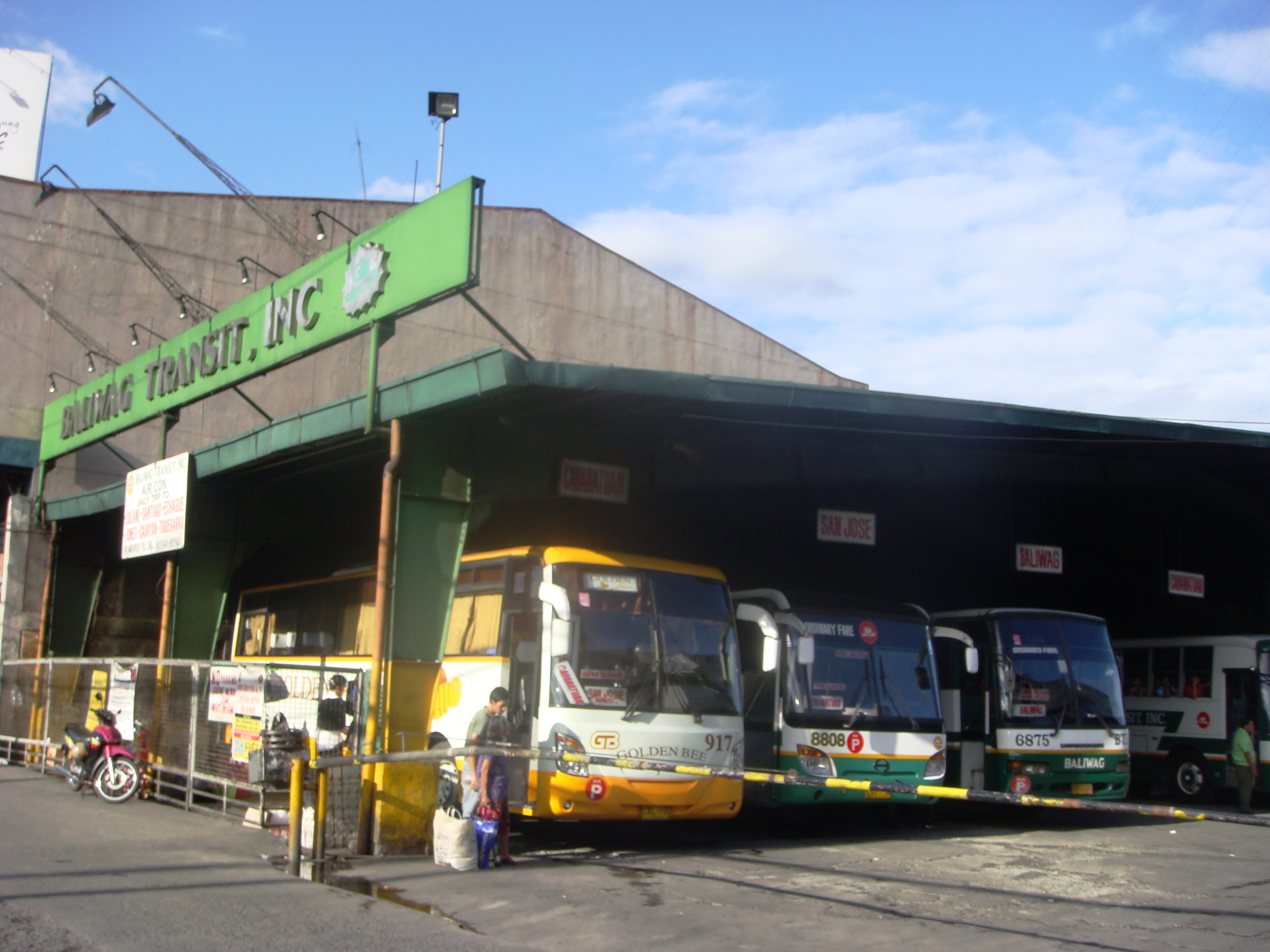
Baliwag Transit bus terminal in Cubao, Quezon City

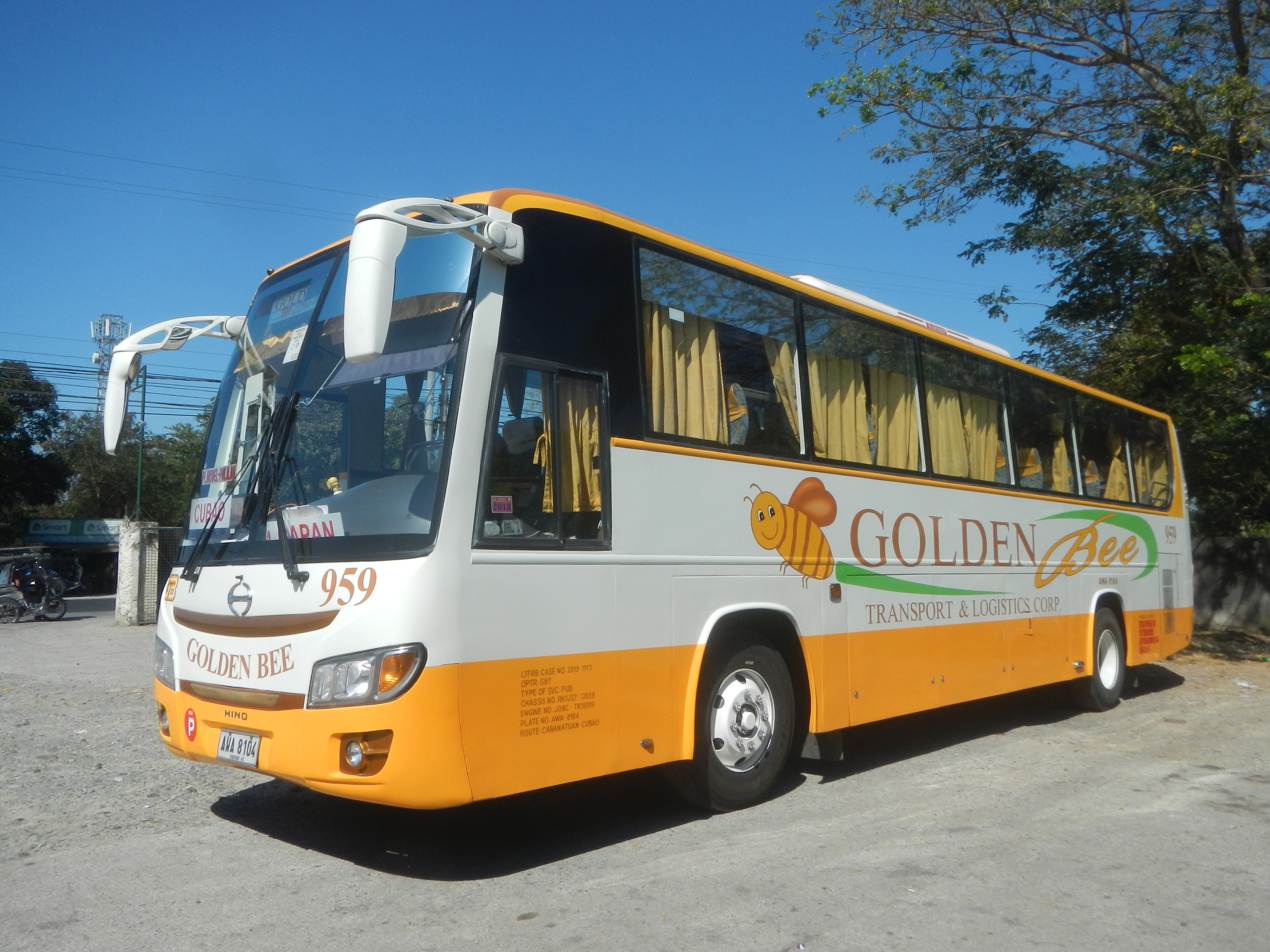
Golden Bee bus 959 (Hino RK1JST Grandeza model)

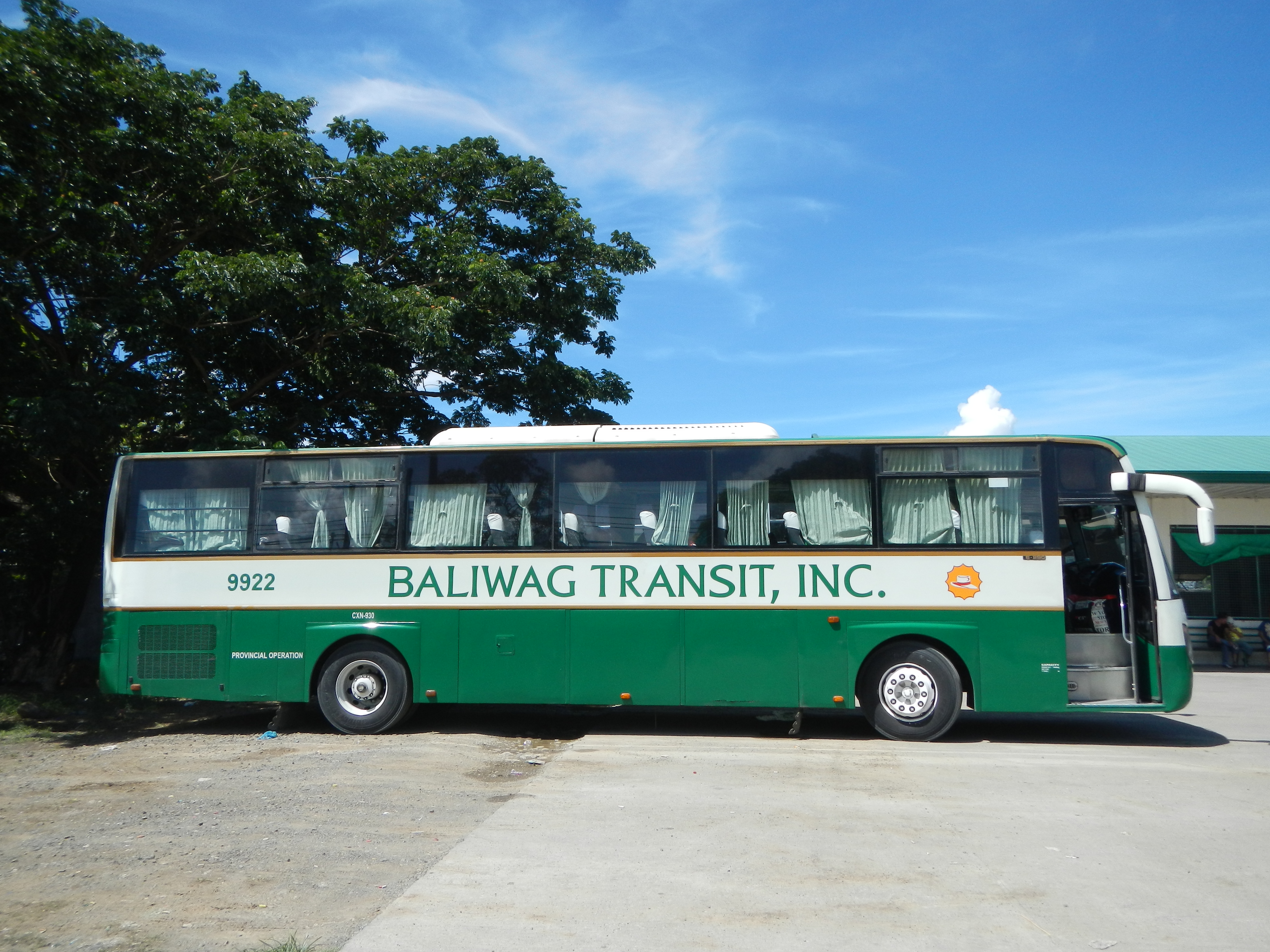
Baliwag Transit bus 9922 (MAN 16.290 Almazora model)

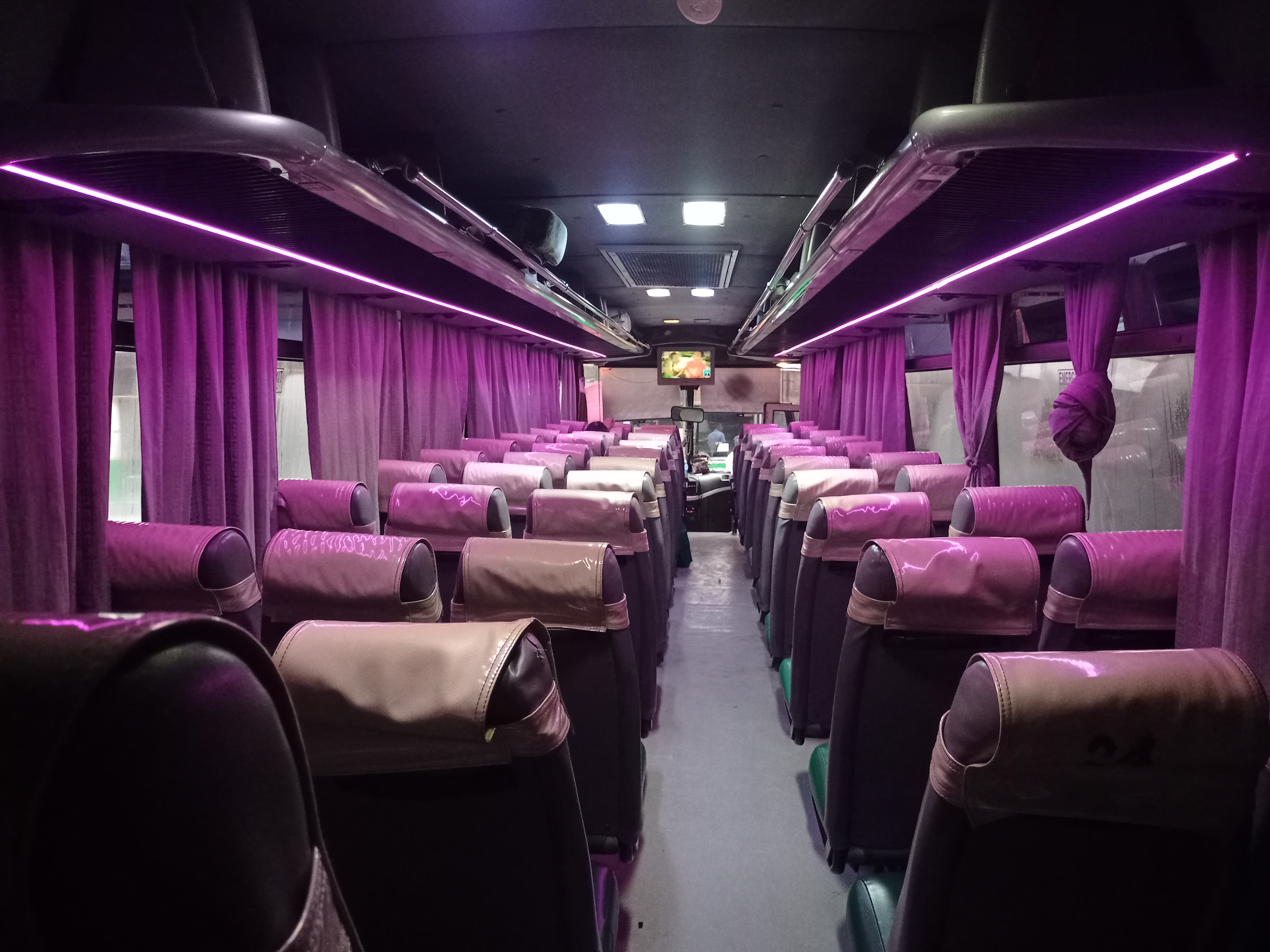
Interior of a Baliwag Transit bus (2x3 Seating)

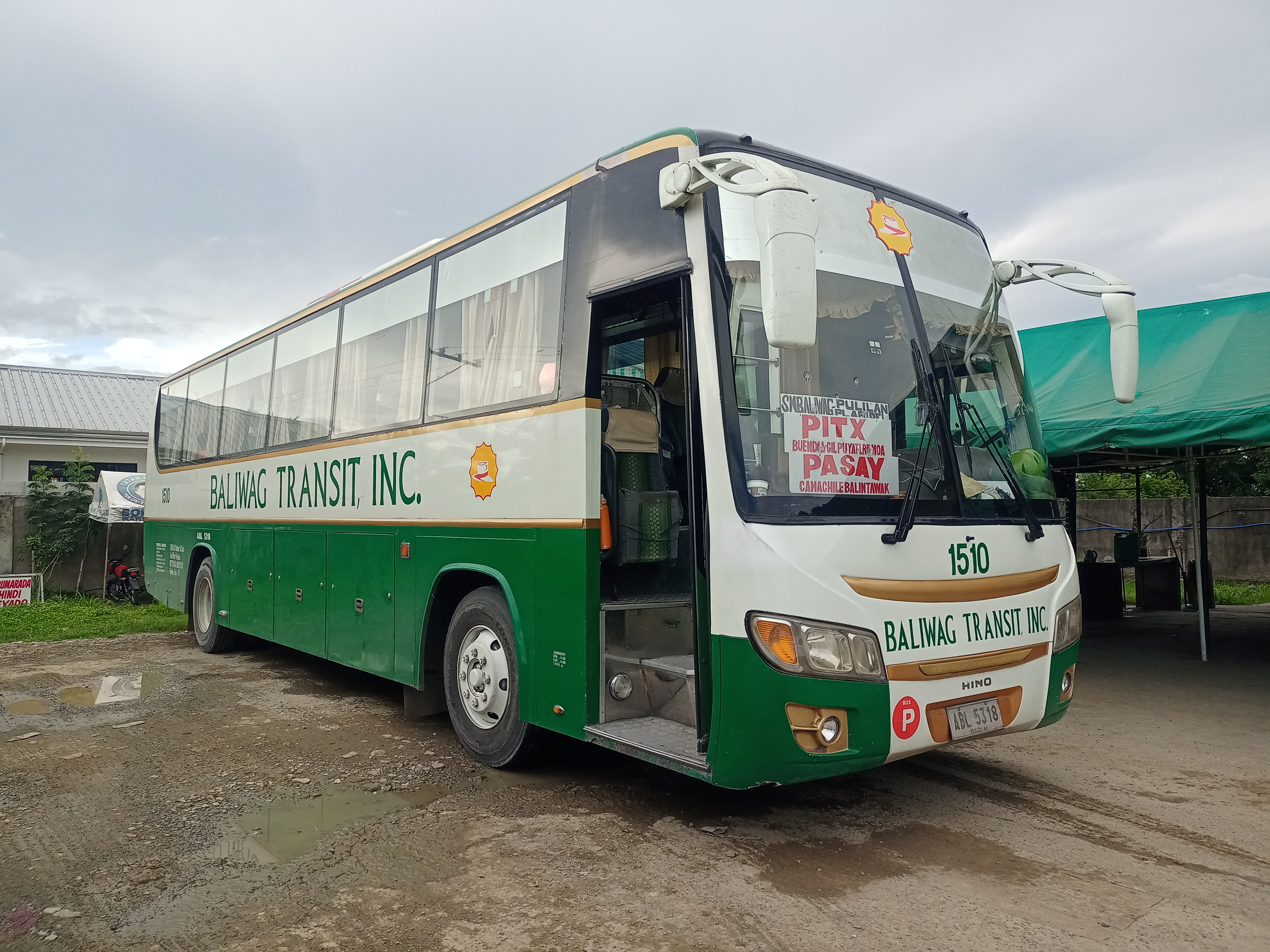
Baliwag Transit bus bound to PITX

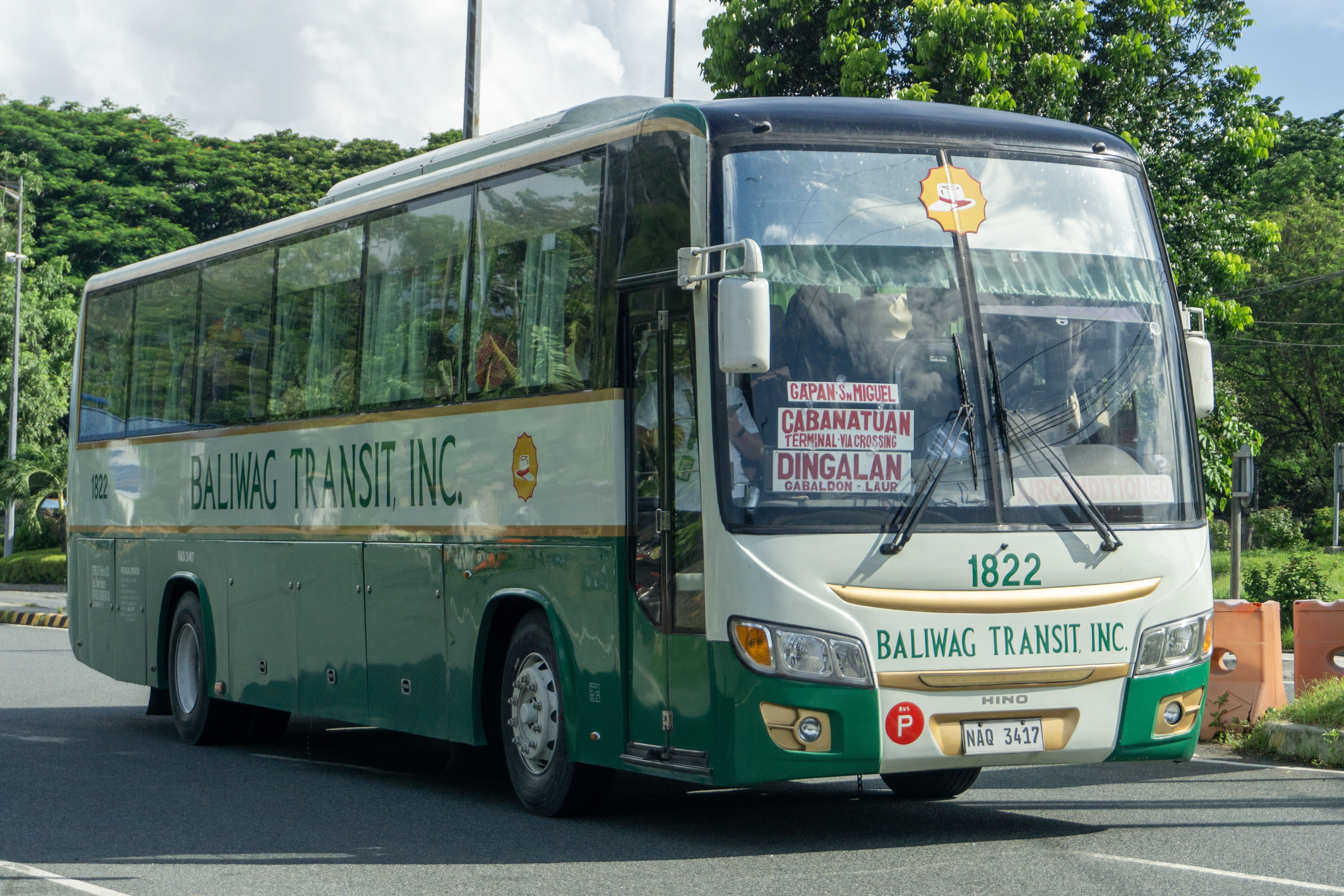
Baliwag Transit bus bound to Dingalan, Aurora

== See also ==
- List of bus companies of the Philippines
- Five Star Bus Company
